= Jan Werner (athlete) =

Polish sprinter (1946–2014)

Personal information
- Born: 25 July 1946 Brzeziny, Poland
- Died: 21 September 2014 (aged 68) Warsaw, Poland
- Height: 1.91 m (6 ft 3 in)
- Weight: 86 kg (190 lb)

Sport
- Sport: Track and field
- Club: AZS Warszawa
Medal record
Men's athletics
Representing Poland
Olympic Games
Silver medal – second place	1976 Montreal	4 × 400 m relay
European Championships
Gold medal – first place	1966 Budapest	4 × 400 m relay
Gold medal – first place	1969 Athens	400 m
Silver medal – second place	1971 Helsinki	4 × 400 m relay
Bronze medal – third place	1971 Helsinki	400 m
European Indoor Championships
Gold medal – first place	1968 Madrid	400 m
Gold medal – first place	1969 Belgrade	400 m
Gold medal – first place	1971 Sofia	400 m
Gold medal – first place	1972 Grenoble	400 m
Silver medal – second place	1969 Belgrade	400 m
Silver medal – second place	1970 Vienna	400 m
Summer Universiade
Gold medal – first place	1970 Turin	4x100m relay

Jan Werner (25 July 1946 – 21 September 2014) was a Polish sprinter who specialized in the 200 and 400 metres.

He was born in Brzeziny and represented the club AZS Warszawa. At the 1966 European Championships he finished fourth in the 200 metres and won the 4 × 400 metres relay together with Edmund Borowski, Stanisław Grędziński and Andrzej Badeński. At the 1967 European Indoor Games he competed in the relay final, but the team did not finish, and at the 1968 European Indoor Games he won a gold medal in the relay.

His first Olympic Games were in 1968. He finished fifth in his semi-final heat in the 400 metres, barely missing out on the final. In the Athletics at the 1968 Summer Olympics – Men's 4 × 400 metres relay he finished fourth together with Stanislaw Gredzinski, Jan Balachowski and Andrzej Badeński. With the same team members he finished fourth in the relay at the 1969 European Championships. In the individual distance he won the gold medal. At the 1969 European Indoor Games he won the 400 metres silver medal behind Balachowski, as well as a relay gold medal.

At the 1970 European Indoor Championships the Polish relay team won silver medals. At the 1971 European Indoor Championships he won a gold medal in the 4 × 400 metres relay together with Waldemar Korycki, Andrzej Badeński and Jan Balachowski. With the same team members he won a silver medal in the relay at the 1971 European Championships. He won a bronze medal in the individual distance. The same team won the relay at the 1972 European Indoor Championships.

At the 1972 Olympic Games he reached the semi-final in the 400 metres and finished fifth in the relay. At the 1976 Olympic Games he finished eighth in the 400 metres and won a silver medal in the relay, together with Ryszard Podlas, Zbigniew Jaremski and Jerzy Pietrzyk.

He became Polish 200 metres champion in 1967, 1969 and 1971 and 400 metres champion in 1968, 1970, 1971 and 1976. His personal best time in the 400 metres was 45.44 seconds, achieved in 1976. He did also equal the European record in the 200 metres with 20.4 seconds on 3 June 1967.

Died 21 September 2014 in Warsaw.

== International competitions ==
Year	Competition	Venue	Position	Event	Notes
Representing Poland
1966	European Championships	Budapest, Hungary	4th	200 m	21.1
1966	European Championships	Budapest, Hungary	8th (h)	4 × 100 m relay	40.6
1966	European Championships	Budapest, Hungary	1st	4 × 400 m relay	3:04.5
1967	European Indoor Games	Prague, Czechoslovakia	1st (h)	Medley relay	3:12.5^{1}
1967	European Cup Final	Kiev, Soviet Union	2nd	200 m	20.9
1967	European Cup Final	Kiev, Soviet Union	1st	4 × 400 m relay	3:04.4
1968	European Indoor Games	Belgrade, Yugoslavia	1st	4 × 364 m relay	2:48.9
1968	Olympic Games	Mexico City, Mexico	9th (sf)	400 m	45.75
1968	Olympic Games	Mexico City, Mexico	4th	4 × 400 m relay	3:00.5
1969	European Indoor Games	Belgrade, Yugoslavia	2nd	400 m	47.4
1969	European Indoor Games	Belgrade, Yugoslavia	1st	4 × 390 m relay	3:01.9
1969	European Championships	Athens, Greece	1st	400 m	45.75
1969	European Championships	Athens, Greece	4th	4 × 400 m relay	3:03.16
1970	European Indoor Championships	Vienna, Austria	2nd	4 × 400 m relay	3:07.5
1970	European Cup Final	Stockholm, Sweden	1st	400 m	45.9
1970	European Cup Final	Stockholm, Sweden	1st	4 × 400 m relay	3:05.1
1970	Universiade	Turin, Italy	4th	200 m	21.2
1970	Universiade	Turin, Italy	1st	4 × 100 m relay	39.2
1971	European Indoor Championships	Sofia, Bulgaria	1st	4 × 400 m relay	3:11.1
1971	European Championships	Helsinki, Finland	3rd	400 m	45.57
1971	European Championships	Helsinki, Finland	2nd	4 × 400 m relay	3:03.64
1972	European Indoor Championships	Grenoble, France	1st	4 × 360 m relay	3:11.1
1972	Olympic Games	Munich, West Germany	12th (sf)	400 m	46.26
1972	Olympic Games	Munich, West Germany	5th	4 × 400 m relay	3:01.05
1975	European Cup Final	Nice, France	5th	4 × 400 m relay	3:06.8
1976	Olympic Games	Montreal, Canada	8th	100 m	45.63
1976	Olympic Games	Montreal, Canada	2nd	4 × 100 m relay	3:01.43

^{1}Did not finish in the final

== Personal bests ==
Outdoors

- 100 metres – 10.3h (Kielce 1967)
- 200 metres – 20.4h (Warsaw 1967)
- 400 metres – 45.44 (Montreal 1976)

Indoors

- 400 metres – 47.4h (Belgrade 1969)

Records
Preceded by Sergio Ottolina	European record holder, men's 200 metres 3 June 1967 – 29 July 1967	Succeeded by Roger Bambuck
