= 1970 European Cup Final (athletics) =

These are the full results of the 1970 European Cup Final in athletics which was held on 29 and 30 August 1970 in Stockholm, Sweden for men and Budapest, Hungary for women.

== Team standings ==
Men
Pos.	Nation	Points
1	East Germany	102
2	Soviet Union	92,5
3	West Germany	91
4	Poland	82
5	France	77,5
6	Sweden	68
7	Italy	47

Women
Pos.	Nation	Points
1	East Germany	70
2	West Germany	63
3	Soviet Union	43
4	Poland	35
5	Great Britain	34
6	Hungary	32

== Men's results ==
=== 100 metres ===
29 August
Wind: +1.0 m/s

Rank	Lane	Name	Nationality	Time	Notes	Points
1	3	Zenon Nowosz	Poland	10.4		7
2	2	Siegfried Schenke	East Germany	10.5		6
3	1	Gerhard Wucherer	West Germany	10.5		5
4	4	Alain Sarteur	France	10.6		4
5	4	Anders Faager	Sweden	10.7		3
6	7	Vladislav Sapeya	Soviet Union	10.7		2
7	6	Ennio Preatoni	Italy	10.7		1

=== 200 metres ===
30 August
Wind: +5.8 m/s

Rank	Lane	Name	Nationality	Time	Notes	Points
1	2	Siegfried Schenke	East Germany	20.7		7
2	1	Jochen Eigenherr	West Germany	20.9		6
3	3	Zenon Nowosz	Poland	21.0		5
4	4	Anders Faager	Sweden	21.0		4
5	5	Gérard Fenouil	France	21.0		3
6	7	Sergey Korovin	Soviet Union	21.1		2
7	6	Giacomo Puosi	Italy	21.4		1

=== 400 metres ===
29 August

Rank	Lane	Name	Nationality	Time	Notes	Points
1	2	Jan Werner	Poland	45.9		7
2	4	Jean-Claude Nallet	France	46.3		6
3	6	Boris Savchuk	Soviet Union	46.7		5
4	3	Michael Fredriksson	Sweden	47.0		4
5	1	Wolfgang Müller	East Germany	47.2		3
6	7	Horst-Rüdiger Schlöske	West Germany	47.2		2
7	5	Furio Fusi	Italy	47.6		1

=== 800 metres ===
30 August

Rank	Name	Nationality	Time	Notes	Points
1	Yevhen Arzhanov	Soviet Union	1:47.8		7
2	Franz-Josef Kemper	West Germany	1:48.6		6
3	Andrzej Kupczyk	Poland	1:48.7		5
4	Wolfgang Schmidt	East Germany	1:49.4		4
5	Gilles Sibon	France	1:49.7		3
6	Jan-Ingvar Ohlsson	Sweden	1:50.3		2
7	Gianni Del Buono	Italy	1:51.2		1

=== 1500 metres ===
29 August

Rank	Name	Nationality	Time	Notes	Points
1	Franco Arese	Italy	3:42.3		7
2	Henryk Szordykowski	Poland	3:42.5		6
3	Jean Wadoux	France	3:42.6		5
4	Mikhail Zhelobovskiy	Soviet Union	3:42.9		4
5	Harald Norpoth	West Germany	3:43.1		3
6	Jan-Ingvar Ohlsson	Sweden	3:47.0		2
7	Klaus-Peter Justus	East Germany	3:47.7		1

=== 5000 metres ===
30 August

Rank	Name	Nationality	Time	Notes	Points
1	Harald Norpoth	West Germany	14:25.4		7
2	Gert Eisenberg	East Germany	14:25.6		6
3	Rashid Sharafyetdinov	Soviet Union	14:25.8		5
4	Anders Gärderud	Sweden	14:27.0		4
5	Giuseppe Cindolo	Italy	14:27.2		3
6	Kazimierz Podolak	Poland	14:29.0		2
7	René Jourdan	France	14:35.6		1

=== 10,000 metres ===
29 August

Rank	Name	Nationality	Time	Notes	Points
1	Jürgen Haase	East Germany	28:26.8		7
2	Nikolay Sviridov	Soviet Union	28:29.2		6
3	Manfred Letzerich	West Germany	28:40.0		5
4	Noël Tijou	France	29:02.4		4
5	Bengt Nåjde	Sweden	29:43.6		3
6	Giuseppe Ardizzone	Italy	29:43.6		2
7	Edward Mleczko	Poland	29:50.8		1

=== 110 metres hurdles ===
29 August
Wind: +0.5 m/s

Rank	Lane	Name	Nationality	Time	Notes	Points
1	2	Guy Drut	France	13.7		7
2	1	Bo Forssander	Sweden	14.0		6
3	5	Günther Nickel	West Germany	14.0		5
4	6	Frank Siebeck	East Germany	14.0		4
5	3	Sergio Liani	Italy	14.0		3
6	4	Viktor Balikhin	Soviet Union	14.3		2
7	7	Marek Jóźwik	Poland	14.4		1

=== 400 metres hurdles ===
30 August

Rank	Lane	Name	Nationality	Time	Notes	Points
1	1	Jean-Claude Nallet	France	50.1		7
2	4	Werner Reibert	West Germany	51.0		6
3	3	Dmitriy Stukalov	Soviet Union	51.2		5
4	5	Christian Rudolph	East Germany	51.3		4
5	7	Torsten Torstensson	Sweden	51.3		3
6	2	Sergio Bello	Italy	54.2		2
7	6	Zdzisław Serafin	Poland	57.5		1

=== 3000 metres steeplechase ===
30 August

Rank	Name	Nationality	Time	Notes	Points
1	Vladimiras Dudinas	Soviet Union	8:31.6		7
2	Ulrich Hobeck	East Germany	8:36.0		6
3	Kazimierz Maranda	Poland	8:38.0		5
4	Umberto Risi	Italy	8:41.0		4
5	Jean-Paul Villain	France	8:44.0		3
6	Sten Bergquist	Sweden	8:46.0		2
7	Rolf Burscheid	West Germany	8:56.6		1

=== 4 × 100 metres relay ===
29 August

Rank	Lane	Nation	Athletes	Time	Note	Points
1	4	East Germany	Joachim Walther, Hans-Jürgen Bombach, Hermann Burde, Harald Eggers	39.4		7
2	5	Poland	Stanisław Wagner, Tadeusz Cuch, Edward Romanowski, Zenon Nowosz	39.5		6
3	3	West Germany	Günther Nickel, Jochen Eigenherr, Gerhard Wucherer, Josef Schwarz	39.6		5
4	7	France	Alain Sarteur, Patrick Bourbeillon, Gérard Fenouil, René Metz	39.8		4
5	2	Soviet Union	Aleksandr Kornelyuk, Vladislav Sapeya, Boris Izmestyev, Valentin Maslakov	40.1		3
6	6	Sweden	Per Ola Bergkvist, Per Olof Sjöberg, Curt Johansson, Anders Faager	40.2		2
7	1	Italy	Ennio Preatoni, Franco Zandano, Gino Perbellini, Pasqualino Abeti	41.5		1

=== 4 × 400 metres relay ===
30 August

Rank	Lane	Nation	Athletes	Time	Note	Points
1	4	Poland	Jan Werner, Edmund Borowski, Jan Balachowski, Andrzej Badeński	3:05.1		7
2	1	Soviet Union	Yevgeniy Borisenko, Yuriy Zorin, Boris Savchuk, Aleksandr Bratchikov	3:06.3		6
3	3	East Germany	Rainer Friedich, Andreas Scheibe, Michael Zerbes, Wolfgang Müller	3:07.1		5
4	2	West Germany	Dieter Hübner, Hermann Köhler, Herbert Moser, Horst-Rüdiger Schlöske	3:08.0		4
5	6	France	André Paoli, Jacques Carette, Gilles Bertould, Jean-Claude Nallet	3:08.6		3
6	5	Sweden	Curt Johansson, Ulf Nilsson, Anders Faager, Michael Fredriksson	3:10.1		2
7	7	Italy	Giacomo Puosi, Sergio Bello, Furio Fusi, Giorgio Ballati	3:12.2		1

=== High jump ===
29 August

Rank	Name	Nationality	1.90	1.99	2.02	2.05	2.07	2.09	2.11	2.13	2.15	2.17	2.19	Result	Notes	Points
1	Kenneth Lundmark	Sweden	–	–	–	o	–	o	–	o	o	–	xxx	2.15		7
2	Valentin Gavrilov	Soviet Union	–	–	o	–	o	–	o	o	x–	xx		2.13		6
3	Gérard Lamy	France	–	–	o	–	o	–	o	o	xxx			2.13		5
4	Gerd Dührkop	East Germany	–	o	–	o	–	xo	o	xo	xxx			2.13		4
5	Erminio Azzaro	Italy	–	–	o	–	o	–	o	–	xxx			2.11		3
6	Hermann Magerl	West Germany	–	–	o	–	xo	xxo	xxx					2.09		2
7	Lech Klinger	Poland	o	o	–	xo	–	xxx						2.05		1

=== Pole vault ===
30 August

Rank	Name	Nationality	4.60	4.80	4.90	5.00	5.05	5.10	5.15	5.20	5.25	5.30	5.35	5.48	Result	Notes	Points
1	Wolfgang Nordwig	East Germany	–	–	o	–	–	o	–	–	o	o	o	xxx	5.35		7
2	Renato Dionisi	Italy	–	–	–	xo	–	–	–	o	–	x–	xx		5.20		6
3	François Tracanelli	France	–	–	–	xxo	–	–	o	–	xxx				5.15		5
4	Kjell Isaksson	Sweden	–	–	xo	–	–	xo	–	xxx					5.10		4
5	Wojciech Buciarski	Poland	o	o	–	o	–	xxo	xxx						5.10		3
6	Hans-Jürgen Ziegler	West Germany	o	o	o	o	xxx								5.00		2
7	Hennadiy Bleznitsov	Soviet Union	–	xxo	–	xxx									4.80		1

=== Long jump ===
29 August

Rank	Name	Nationality	#1	#2	#3	#4	#5	#6	Result	Notes	Points
1	Jack Pani	France	x	8.09	8.06	7.90	x	8.06	8.09		7
2	Klaus Beer	East Germany	7.87	x	8.07	x	7.12	x	8.07		6
3	Josef Schwarz	West Germany	7.89	7.99	7.68	7.87	7.84	x	7.99		5
4	Igor Ter-Ovanesyan	Soviet Union	7.74	x	x	x	x	x	7.74		4
5	Stanisław Cabaj	Poland	7.36	x	x	x	7.58	7.22	7.58		3
6	Stig Fassberg	Sweden	7.33	7.24	7.34	x	x	7.43	7.43		2
7	Carlo Arrighi	Italy	7.02	7.07	7.13	7.18	7.26	7.29	7.29		1

=== Triple jump ===
30 August

Rank	Name	Nationality	#1	#2	#3	#4	#5	#6	Result	Notes	Points
1	Jörg Drehmel	East Germany	17.07	16.80	16.53	x	17.13	x	17.13	NR	7
2	Viktor Saneyev	Soviet Union	16.89	16.48	17.01	16.70	16.85	16.48	17.01		6
3	Józef Szmidt	Poland	15.82	x	16.14	x	16.59	16.65	16.65		5
4	Michael Sauer	West Germany	x	16.27	15.77	16.39	14.12	x	16.39		4
5	Giuseppe Gentile	Italy	x	x	15.55	x	16.36	x	16.36		3
6	Bo Blomqvist	Sweden	15.55	15.80	15.79	x	15.80	x	15.80		2
7	Raymond Privé	France	x	15.57	x	x	x	x	15.57		1

=== Shot put ===
29 August

Rank	Name	Nationality	#1	#2	#3	#4	#5	#6	Result	Notes	Points
1	Hartmut Briesenick	East Germany	x	19.40	20.27	19.87	20.04	20.55	20.55		7
2	Heinfried Birlenbach	West Germany	19.50	19.54	x	x	x	x	19.54		6
3	Pierre Colnard	France	19.22	19.44	19.35	x	18.99	18.79	19.44		5
4	Nikolay Karasev	Soviet Union	19.17	x	18.95	x	x	18.81	19.17		4
5	Thord Carlsson	Sweden	17.75	18.30	18.19	x	18.61	x	18.61		3
6	Edmund Antczak	Poland	17.87	17.87	17.82	18.21	x	x	18.21		2
7	Renato Bergonzoni	Italy	16.62	17.38	17.17	16.73	16.85	16.65	17.38		1

=== Discus throw ===
30 August

Rank	Name	Nationality	#1	#2	#3	#4	#5	#6	Result	Notes	Points
1	Ricky Bruch	Sweden	64.88	62.38	x	62.36	62.28	?	64.88		7
2	Hein-Direck Neu	West Germany	53.40	60.04	61.40	60.82	60.92	x	61.40		6
3	Vladimir Lyakhov	Soviet Union	55.86	x	56.54	55.86	56.18	59.26	59.26		5
4	Leszek Gajdziński	Poland	58.28	56.56	58.74	59.22	58.66	58.98	59.22		4
5	Detlef Thorith	East Germany	55.54	x	x	57.26	59.02	x	59.02		3
6	Silvano Simeon	Italy	58.14	x	57.08	57.40	x	x	58.14		2
7	Jacques Nys	France	x	x	48.20	52.30	x	52.0?	52.30		1

=== Hammer throw ===
29 August

Rank	Name	Nationality	#1	#2	#3	#4	#5	#6	Result	Notes	Points
1	Anatoliy Bondarchuk	Soviet Union	70.46	68.14	70.30	70.34	68.16	66.20	70.46		7
2	Uwe Beyer	West Germany	69.46	67.92	69.40	x	66.84	x	69.46		6
3	Reinhard Theimer	East Germany	x	x	68.22	65.90	68.10	69.32	69.32		5
4	Stanisław Lubiejewski	Poland	x	x	64.98	62.36	63.96	65.50	65.50		4
5	Mario Vecchiato	Italy	64.22	x	x	64.50	x	x	64.50		3
6	Sune Blomqvist	Sweden	63.32	63.16	x	x	62.08	x	63.32		2
7	Wladimir Prikhodko	Soviet Union	52.82	x	x	60.90	x	60.90	60.90		1

=== Javelin throw ===
29 August – Old model

Rank	Name	Nationality	#1	#2	#3	#4	#5	#6	Result	Notes	Points
1	Władysław Nikiciuk	Poland	75.06	79.68	82.46	80.42	x	x	82.46		7
2	Jānis Lūsis	Soviet Union	81.50	81.74	77.94	x	78.50	76.68	81.74		6
3	Klaus Wolfermann	West Germany	68.58	78.78	77.60	80.90	76.02	80.24	80.90		5
4	Raimo Pihl	Sweden	79.52	x	x	x	x	74.44	79.52		4
5	Manfred Stolle	East Germany	66.70	73.52	74.66	73.24	77.26	78.62	78.62		3
6	Lolesio Tuita	France	x	69.52	67.08	x	70.34	x	70.34		2
7	Renzo Cremerotti	Italy	64.80	64.36	x	x	67.68	68.94	68.94		1

== Women's results ==
=== 100 metres ===
22 August
Wind: +0.3 m/s

Rank	Name	Nationality	Time	Notes	Points
1	Ingrid Mickler	West Germany	11.3	NR	6
2	Renate Meissner	East Germany	11.4		5
3	Györgyi Balogh	Hungary	11.4		4
4	Galina Bukharina	Soviet Union	11.6		3
5	Helena Kerner	Poland	11.7		2
6	Val Peat	Great Britain	11.7		1

=== 200 metres ===
22 August
Wind: -0.2 m/s

Rank	Name	Nationality	Time	Notes	Points
1	Renate Meissner	East Germany	23.1		6
2	Ingrid Mickler	West Germany	23.3		5
3	Györgyi Balogh	Hungary	23.3		4
4	Helen Golden	Great Britain	23.7		3
5	Urszula Józwik	Poland	24.0		2
6	Nadezhda Besfamilnaya	Soviet Union	24.7		1

=== 400 metres ===
22 August

Rank	Name	Nationality	Time	Notes	Points
1	Helga Fischer	East Germany	53.2		6
2	Christel Frese	West Germany	53.5		5
3	Vera Popkova	Soviet Union	54.0		4
4	Rosemary Stirling	Great Britain	54.4		3
5	Rozalia Séfer	Hungary	54.7		2
6	Elżbieta Skowrońska	Poland	55.6		1

=== 800 metres ===
22 August

Rank	Name	Nationality	Time	Notes	Points
1	Hildegard Janze	West Germany	2:04.9		6
2	Sheila Carey	Great Britain	2:05.3		5
3	Barbara Wieck	East Germany	2:05.4		4
4	Magdolna Kulcsár	Hungary	2:06.4		3
5	Danuta Wierzbowska	Poland	2:07.1		2
6	Sarmite Shtula	Soviet Union	2:07.8		1

=== 1500 metres ===
22 August

Rank	Name	Nationality	Time	Notes	Points
1	Ellen Tittel	West Germany	4:16.3		6
2	Gunhild Hoffmeister	East Germany	4:16.5		5
3	Lyudmila Bragina	Soviet Union	4:17.2		4
4	Rita Ridley	Great Britain	4:19.8		3
5	Sara Ligetkuti	Hungary	4:20.7	NR	2
6	Zofia Kołakowska	Poland	4:22.0		1

=== 100 metres hurdles ===
22 August
Wind: -0.4 m/s

Rank	Name	Nationality	Time	Notes	Points
1	Karin Balzer	East Germany	13.1		6
2	Teresa Sukniewicz	Poland	13.2		5
3	Margit Bach	West Germany	13.7		4
4	Tatyana Kondrasheva	Soviet Union	13.8		3
5	Christine Bell	Great Britain	13.9		2
6	Mária Kiss	Hungary	14.3		1

=== 4 × 100 metres relay ===
22 August

Rank	Nation	Athletes	Time	Note	Points
1	West Germany	Elfgard Schittenhelm, Annie Wilden, Rita Jahn, Ingrid Mickler	43.9		6
2	East Germany	Renate Meissner, Christina Heinich, Bärbel Schrickel, Marion Wagner	44.5		5
3	Hungary	Erzsébet Bartos, Judit Szabó, Györgyi Balogh, Katalin Papp	44.8		4
4	Soviet Union	Lyudmila Zharkova, Lyudmila Golomazova, Marina Nikiforova, Nadezhda Besfamilnaya	45.0		3
5	Poland	Urszula Soszka, Danuta Jędrejek, Urszula Jóźwik, Helena Kerner	45.2		2
6	Great Britain	Anita Neil, Margaret Critchley, Val Peat, Helen Golden	45.4		1

=== 4 × 400 metres relay ===
22 August

Rank	Nation	Athletes	Time	Note	Points
1	East Germany	Helga Fischer, Renate Marder, Brigitte Rohde, Monika Zehrt	3:37.0		6
2	West Germany	Christel Frese, Christa Czekay, Inge Eckhoff, Heidi Gerhard	3:37.2		5
3	Great Britain	Rosemary Stirling, Maureen Tranter, Val Peat, Helen Golden	3:37.8		4
4	Soviet Union	Vera Popkova, Raisa Nikanorova, Anna Dundare, Ingrīda Barkāne	3:38.6		3
5	Poland	Bożena Zientarska, Krystyna Hryniewicka, Czesława Nowak, Elżbieta Skowrońska	3:39.5		2
6	Hungary	Rozalia Séfer, Magdolna Kulcsár, Magdolna Lázár, Éva Pusztai	3:41.6		1

=== High jump ===
22 August

Rank	Name	Nationality	Result	Notes	Points
1	Rita Schmidt	East Germany	1.84		6
2	Antonina Lazareva	Soviet Union	1.84		5
3	Karen Mack	West Germany	1.76		4
4	Danuta Konowska	Poland	1.73		3
5	Magdolna Komka	Hungary	1.73		2
6	Barbara Inkpen	Great Britain	1.73		1

=== Long jump ===
22 August

Rank	Name	Nationality	#1	#2	#3	#4	#5	#6	Result	Notes	Points
1	Heide Rosendahl	West Germany	6.67	4.89	x	6.62	6.80	6.61	6.80	NR	6
2	Ann Wilson	Great Britain	6.57w	6.24	6.19	6.26	5.88	6.16	6.57w		5
3	Margrit Herbst	East Germany	6.24	x	x	x	x	6.44	6.44		4
4	Ryszarda Warzocha	Poland	6.02	6.29	6.10	6.18	x	6.09	6.29		3
5	Alla Smirnova	Soviet Union	5.95	5.66	6.07	x	5.93	5.90	6.07		2
6	Klara Voth	Hungary	5.97	6.03	5.94	5.87	5.89	5.98	6.03		1

=== Shot put ===
22 August

Rank	Name	Nationality	#1	#2	#3	#4	#5	#6	Result	Notes	Points
1	Nadezhda Chizhova	Soviet Union	19.42	19.33	18.82	18.94	18.86	x	19.42		6
2	Hannelore Friedel	East Germany	16.52	17.75	18.01	17.07	17.34	17.55	18.01		5
3	Ludwika Chewińska	Poland	16.80	17.01	16.65	16.57	x	16.65	17.01		4
4	Marlene Fuchs	West Germany	16.74	16.80	x	x	16.53	16.90	16.90		3
5	Judit Bognár	Hungary	16.14	15.77	x	x	15.71	x	16.14		2
6	Mary Peters	Great Britain	15.02	x	x	x	14.04	14.19	15.02		1

=== Discus throw ===
22 August

Rank	Name	Nationality	#1	#2	#3	#4	#5	#6	Result	Notes	Points
1	Karin Illgen	East Germany	61.60	58.72	59.34	58.96	57.72	56.14	61.60		6
2	Liesel Westermann	West Germany	57.32	x	61.00	59.52	x	61.44	61.44		5
3	Tamara Danilova	Soviet Union	x	53.00	57.84	x	x	57.22	57.84		4
4	Jolán Kleiber	Hungary	x	48.32	55.20	55.28	x	x	55.28		3
5	Rosemary Payne	Great Britain	52.70	52.26	50.94	50.86	53.04	51.58	53.04		2
6	Jadwiga Wojtczak	Poland	49.38	x	x	47.74	x	x	49.38		1

=== Javelin throw ===
22 August – Old model

Rank	Name	Nationality	#1	#2	#3	#4	#5	#6	Result	Notes	Points
1	Ruth Fuchs	East Germany	51.84	49.64	53.24	54.04	57.62	60.60	60.60	NR	6
2	Daniela Jaworska	Poland	45.20	55.90	x	x	50.18	52.18	55.90		5
3	Mārīte Saulīte	Soviet Union	x	50.38	x	54.52	x	52.74	54.52		4
4	Magda Vidos	Hungary	53.44	52.22	x	x	x	50.10	53.44		3
5	Ameli Koloska	West Germany	51.92	x	x	x	50.64	x	51.92		2
6	Anne Farquhar	Great Britain	44.44	x	x	43.54	37.52	43.62	44.44		1
