= 1969 European Athletics Championships – Men's 400 metres =

Men's 400 metres at the European Athletics Championships

The men's 400 metres at the 1969 European Athletics Championships was held in Athens, Greece, at Georgios Karaiskakis Stadium on 16, 17, and 18 September 1969.

== Medalists ==
Gold	Jan Werner; Poland
Silver	Jean-Claude Nallet; France
Bronze	Stanisław Grędziński; Poland

== Results ==
=== Final ===
18 September

Rank	Name	Nationality	Time	Notes
1st place, gold medalist(s)	Jan Werner	Poland	45.75	CR
2nd place, silver medalist(s)	Jean-Claude Nallet	France	45.81	
3rd place, bronze medalist(s)	Stanisław Grędziński	Poland	45.83	
4	Jacques Carette	France	45.92	
5	Aleksandr Bratchikov	Soviet Union	45.94	NR
6	Andrzej Badeński	Poland	46.09	
7	Boris Savchuk	Soviet Union	46.38	
8	Sergio Bello	Italy	46.63	

=== Semi-finals ===
17 September

==== Semi-final 1 ====
Rank	Name	Nationality	Time	Notes
1	Andrzej Badeński	Poland	46.4	Q
2	Jean-Claude Nallet	France	46.6	Q
3	Jacques Carette	France	46.7	Q
4	Boris Savchuk	Soviet Union	46.7	Q
5	Claudio Trachelio	Italy	46.9	
6	John Robertson	Great Britain	47.0	
7	Martin Winbolt-Lewis	Great Britain	47.2	
8	Yuriy Zorin	Soviet Union	47.8	

==== Semi-final 2 ====
Rank	Name	Nationality	Time	Notes
1	Stanisław Grędziński	Poland	46.4	Q
2	Aleksandr Bratchikov	Soviet Union	46.5	Q
3	Jan Werner	Poland	46.5	Q
4	Sergio Bello	Italy	47.0	Q
5	Colin Campbell	Great Britain	47.2	
6	Gilles Bertould	France	47.2	
7	Ulf Rönner	Sweden	47.4	
8	Manuel Gayoso	Spain	47.6	

=== Heats ===
16 September

==== Heat 1 ====
Rank	Name	Nationality	Time	Notes
1	Andrzej Badeński	Poland	46.9	Q
2	Claudio Trachelio	Italy	47.0	Q
3	Boris Savchuk	Soviet Union	47.3	Q
4	Gilles Bertould	France	47.6	Q
5	Luciano Sušanj	Yugoslavia	48.4	
6	Georgi Bozhkov	Bulgaria	48.5	

==== Heat 2 ====
Rank	Name	Nationality	Time	Notes
1	Jean-Claude Nallet	France	47.8	Q
2	Jan Werner	Poland	47.8	Q
3	John Robertson	Great Britain	47.8	Q
4	Manuel Gayoso	Spain	48.1	Q
5	Emile Jung	Luxembourg	48.6	

==== Heat 3 ====
Rank	Name	Nationality	Time	Notes
1	Stanisław Grędziński	Poland	46.6	Q
2	Aleksandr Bratchikov	Soviet Union	46.7	Q
3	Colin Campbell	Great Britain	46.8	Q
4	Sergio Bello	Italy	47.2	Q
5	Willy Vandenwyngaerden	Belgium	47.5	
6	Richard Simonsen	Norway	47.8	
7	Haris Dimitriou	Greece	48.8	

==== Heat 4 ====
Rank	Name	Nationality	Time	Notes
1	Yuriy Zorin	Soviet Union	46.5	Q
2	Jacques Carette	France	46.7	Q
3	Martin Winbolt-Lewis	Great Britain	46.7	Q
4	Ulf Rönner	Sweden	46.9	Q
5	Barcelo de Carvalho	Portugal	47.2	
6	Ramon Magarinos	Spain	48.0	

== Participation ==
According to an unofficial count, 24 athletes from 14 countries participated in the event.

- Belgium (1)
- Bulgaria (1)
- France (3)
- Greece (1)
- Italy (2)
- Luxembourg (1)
- Norway (1)
- Poland (3)
- Portugal (1)
- Soviet Union (3)
- Spain (2)
- Sweden (1)
- Great Britain (3)
- Yugoslavia (1)
