= 1967 European Cup Final (athletics) =

These are the full results of the 1967 European Cup Final in athletics which was held between 15 and 17 September 1967 in Kiev, Soviet Union.

== Team standings ==
Men
Pos.	Nation	Points
1	Soviet Union	81
2	East Germany	80
3	West Germany	79
4	Poland	68
5	France	57
6	Hungary	53

Women
Pos.	Nation	Points
1	Soviet Union	51
2	East Germany	43
3	West Germany	36
4	Poland	35
5	Great Britain	34
6	Hungary	32

== Men's results ==
=== 100 metres ===
16 September

Rank	Lane	Name	Nationality	Time	Notes	Points
1	6	Vladislav Sapeya	Soviet Union	10.3		6
2	2	Hartmut Wilke	West Germany	10.4		5
3	1	Harald Eggers	East Germany	10.5		4
4	4	Wiesław Maniak	Poland	10.5		3
5	3	Claude Piquemal	France	10.5		2
6	5	László Mihályfi	Hungary	10.6		1

=== 200 metres ===
17 September

Rank	Name	Nationality	Time	Notes	Points
1	Jean-Claude Nallet	France	20.9		6
2	Jan Werner	Poland	20.9		5
3	László Mihályfi	Hungary	21.1		4
4	Amin Tuyakov	Soviet Union	21.1		3
5	Gerd Metz	West Germany	21.1		2
6	Heinz Erbstößer	East Germany	21.3		

=== 400 metres ===
16 September

Rank	Lane	Name	Nationality	Time	Notes	Points
1	Jean-Claude Nallet	France	46.3		6	
2	Fritz Roderfeld	West Germany	46.4		5	
3	Andrzej Badeński	Poland	46.8		4	
4	Michael Zerbes	East Germany	47.1		3	
5	Boris Savchuk	Soviet Union	47.2		2	
6	Imre Nemesházi	Hungary	48.7		1	

=== 800 metres ===
17 September

Rank	Name	Nationality	Time	Notes	Points
1	Manfred Matuschewski	East Germany	1:46.9		6
2	Franz-Josef Kemper	West Germany	1:46.9		5
3	Jean-Pierre Dufresne	France	1:48.2		4
4	Imre Nagy	Hungary	1:48.3		3
5	Eryk Żelazny	Poland	1:48.5		2
6	Igor Potapchenko	Soviet Union	1:49.9		1

=== 1500 metres ===
16 September

Rank	Name	Nationality	Time	Notes	Points
1	Manfred Matuschewski	East Germany	3:40.2		6
2	Bodo Tümmler	West Germany	3:40.5		5
3	Oleg Rayko	Soviet Union	3:41.2		4
4	Claude Nicolas	France	3:42.2		3
5	György Kiss	Hungary	3:43.0		2
6	Henryk Szordykowski	Poland	3:44.1		1

=== 5000 metres ===
17 September

Rank	Name	Nationality	Time	Notes	Points
1	Harald Norpoth	West Germany	15:26.8		6
2	Jürgen Haase	East Germany	15:27.8		5
3	György Kiss	Hungary	15:29.2		4
4	Edward Stawiarz	Poland	15:30.0		3
5	René Jourdan	France	15:30.4		2
6	Viktor Kudynskyy	Soviet Union	15:35.2		1

=== 10,000 metres ===
16 September

Rank	Name	Nationality	Time	Notes	Points
1	Jürgen Haase	East Germany	28:54.2		6
2	Lajos Mecser	Hungary	28:55.6		5
3	Anatoliy Makarov	Soviet Union	28:58.6		4
4	Noël Tijou	France	29:04.6		3
5	Mieczysław Korzec	Poland	29:52.0		2
6	Hans Gerlach	West Germany	30:42.0		1

=== 110 metres hurdles ===
16 September

Rank	Lane	Name	Nationality	Time	Notes	Points
1	Viktor Balikhin	Soviet Union	14.0		6	
2	Adam Kołodziejczyk	Poland	14.2		5	
3	Pierre Schoebel	France	14.2		4	
4	Raimund Bethge	East Germany	14.4		3	
5	Béla Mélykúti	Hungary	14.7		2	
6	Hinrich John	West Germany	16.0		1	

=== 400 metres hurdles ===
17 September

Rank	Lane	Name	Nationality	Time	Notes	Points
1	Gerhard Hennige	West Germany	50.2		6	
2	Wilhelm Weistand	Poland	50.5	NR	5	
3	Joachim Singer	East Germany	50.5		4	
4	Edvīns Zāģeris	Soviet Union	51.0		3	
5	Robert Poirier	France	52.2		2	
6	Zsoltan Ringhoffer	Hungary	52.3		1	

=== 3000 metres steeplechase ===
17 September

Rank	Name	Nationality	Time	Notes	Points
1	Anatoliy Kuryan	Soviet Union	8:38.8		6
2	Manfred Letzerich	West Germany	8:39.6		5
3	Guy Texereau	France	8:41.2		4
4	Dieter Hartmann	East Germany	8:42.0		3
5	Wolfgang Luers	Poland	8:50.0		2
6	István Jóny	Hungary	9:02.8		1

=== 4 × 100 metres relay ===
16 September

Rank	Lane	Nation	Athletes	Time	Note	Points
1	France	Marc Berger, Jocelyn Delecour, Claude Piquemal, Gérard Fenouil	39.2	NR	6	
2	West Germany	Jobst Hirscht, Gert Metz, Hartmut Wilke, Horst Assion	39.3	NR	5	
3	East Germany	Heinz Erbstößer, Peter Haase, Hermann Burde, Harald Eggers	39.4	NR	4	
4	Soviet Union	Edvin Ozolin, Amin Tuyakov, Sergey Abalikhin, Aleksandr Lebedyev	39.8		3	
5	Poland	Adam Kaczor, Edward Romanowski, Tadeusz Jaworski, Wiesław Maniak	40.4		2	
	Hungary	Lajos Hajdó, Henrik Kalocsai, Gyula Rábai, László Mihályfi	DQ		0	

=== 4 × 400 metres relay ===
17 September

Rank	Lane	Nation	Athletes	Time	Note	Points
1	Poland	Stanisław Grędziński, Edmund Borowski, Jan Werner, Andrzej Badeński	3:04.4		6	
2	West Germany	Helmar Müller, Ingo Röper, Jens Ulbricht, Fritz Roderfeld	3:04.5		5	
3	East Germany	Wolfgang Müller, Michael Zerbes, Günter Klann, Wilfried Weiland	3:05.8		4	
4	France	Christian Nicolau, Michel Samper, Jean-Pierre Dufresne, Jean-Claude Nallet	3:06.1		3	
5	Soviet Union	Igor Khlopov, Boris Savchuk, Aleksandr Ivanov, Aleksandr Bratchikov	3:06.2		2	
6	Hungary	István Batori, István Gyulai, Imre Nemesházi, László Mihályfi	3:08.2		1	

=== High jump ===
16 September

Rank	Name	Nationality	Result	Notes	Points
1	Valentin Gavrilov	Soviet Union	2.09		6
2	Wolfgang Schillkowski	West Germany	2.07		5
3	Sándor Noszály	Hungary	2.07		4
4	Henri Elliott	France	2.05		3
5	Edward Czernik	Poland	2.05		2
6	Rudi Köppen	East Germany	2.05		1

=== Pole vault ===
17 September

Rank	Name	Nationality	Result	Notes	Points
1	Wolfgang Nordwig	East Germany	5.10		6
2	Hennadiy Bleznitsov	Soviet Union	5.05		5
3	Klaus Lehnertz	West Germany	4.90		4
4	Waldemar Węcek	Poland	4.70		3
5	Ágoston Schulek	Hungary	4.60		2
6	Hervé d'Encausse	France	4.60		1

=== Long jump ===
16 September

Rank	Name	Nationality	#1	#2	#3	#4	#5	#6	Result	Notes	Points
1	Igor Ter-Ovanesyan	Soviet Union	7.66	7.75	8.02	7.79	8.03	8.14w	8.14w		6
2	Andrzej Stalmach	Poland	x	7.88w	x	7.74	7.57	7.81	7.88w		5
3	Josef Schwarz	West Germany	7.45	x	7.85ww	7.37	7.74	5.35	7.85w		4
4	Klaus Beer	East Germany	7.38	7.45	7.07	x	x	7.02	7.45		3
5	Béla Margitics	Hungary	7.43	x	x	x	7.44	7.37	7.44		2
6	Jack Pani	France	7.32	x	7.29	7.22	7.33	7.38	7.38		1

=== Triple jump ===
17 September

Rank	Name	Nationality	#1	#2	#3	#4	#5	#6	Result	Notes	Points
1	Viktor Saneyev	Soviet Union	16.11	16.67	16.30	16.18	16.23	16.25	16.67		6
2	Hans-Jürgen Rückborn	East Germany	x	x	x	16.11	15.96	16.43	16.43		5
3	Józef Szmidt	Poland	16.10	16.29	x	16.26	x	x	16.29		4
4	Henrik Kalocsai	Hungary	12.91	16.09	16.07	13.91	15.93	15.90	16.09		3
5	Michael Sauer	West Germany	15.59	15.82	16.02	15.56	x	x	16.02		2
6	Christian Kaddour	France	14.45	r					14.45		1

=== Shot put ===
16 September

Rank	Name	Nationality	#1	#2	#3	#4	#5	#6	Result	Notes	Points
1	Vilmos Varjú	Hungary	19.25	r					19.25		6
2	Heinfried Birlenbach	West Germany	19.20	19.00	18.82	18.54	18.24	18.41	19.20	NR	5
3	Hans-Dieter Prollius	East Germany	16.80	17.50	18.70	x	18.06	18.82	18.82		4
4	Pierre Colnard	France	18.56	18.52	18.00	x	18.00	x	18.56		3
5	Władysław Komar	Poland	18.54	x	x	18.36	18.25	18.40	18.54		2
6	Eduard Gushchin	Soviet Union	17.80	17.46	x	17.64	17.32	17.85	17.85		1

=== Discus throw ===
17 September

Rank	Name	Nationality	#1	#2	#3	#4	#5	#6	Result	Notes	Points
1	Edmund Piątkowski	Poland	x	55.30	56.78	59.10	58.80	x	59.10		6
2	Detlef Thorith	East Germany	55.80	x	57.12	57.86	x	x	57.86		5
3	Vitautas Jaras	Soviet Union	x	52.98	x	56.60	x	x	56.60		4
4	Hein-Direck Neu	West Germany	52.70	54.70	54.22	55.00	55.38	56.20	56.20		3
5	Géza Fejér	Hungary	54.86	x	54.94	x	54.34	53.90	54.94		2
6	Pierre Alard	France	48.44	48.40	49.26	50.12	50.40	49.00	50.40		1

=== Hammer throw ===
16 September

Rank	Name	Nationality	#1	#2	#3	#4	#5	#6	Result	Notes	Points
1	Romuald Klim	Soviet Union	66.76	70.58	x	69.84	57.94	68.80	70.58		6
2	Gyula Zsivótzky	Hungary	66.06	x	x	66.52	67.56	68.12	68.12		5
3	Uwe Beyer	West Germany	64.26	65.78	65.10	66.34	65.76	66.80	66.80		4
4	Zdzisław Smoliński	Poland	63.58	64.72	62.02	61.34	x	62.06	64.72		3
5	Manfred Losch	East Germany	x	59.82	58.66	61.82	59.90	61.40	61.82		2
6	Gérard Chadefaux	France	56.46	57.72	57.06	59.00	57.98	60.20	60.20		1

=== Javelin throw ===
17 September – Old model

Rank	Name	Nationality	#1	#2	#3	#4	#5	#6	Result	Notes	Points
1	Jānis Lūsis	Soviet Union	84.46	85.38	80.90	x	78.96	84.30	85.38		6
2	Manfred Stolle	East Germany	81.14	x	73.96	x	72.72	77.32	81.14		5
3	Gergely Kulcsár	Hungary	78.30	78.00	79.46	76.68	x	77.38	79.46		4
4	Władysław Nikiciuk	Poland	73.30	74.44	77.46	x	78.14	78.40	78.40		3
5	Hermann Salomon	West Germany	75.10	75.18	77.56	74.82	75.32	74.26	77.56		2
6	Jean-Claude Gapaillard	France	64.84	68.96	64.32	x	69.82	69.52	69.82		1

== Women's results ==
=== 100 metres ===
15 September
Wind: +0.5 m/s

Rank	Lane	Name	Nationality	Time	Notes	Points
1	2	Irena Kirszenstein	Poland	11.3		6
2	6	Renate Heldt	East Germany	11.5		5
3	1	Margit Nemesházi	Hungary	11.6		4
4	4	Vera Popkova	Soviet Union	11.7		3
5	5	Anita Neil	Great Britain	11.8		2
6	3	Karin Frisch	West Germany	11.8		1

=== 200 metres ===
15 September
Wind: +0.5 m/s

Rank	Name	Nationality	Time	Notes	Points
1	Irena Kirszenstein	Poland	23.0		6
2	Annamária Tóth	Hungary	23.4	NR	5
3	Vera Popkova	Soviet Union	23.4		4
4	Hannelore Trabert	West Germany	23.8		3
5	Maureen Tranter	Great Britain	23.8		2
6	Christina Heinich	East Germany	24.2		1

=== 400 metres ===
15 September

Rank	Name	Nationality	Time	Notes	Points
1	Lillian Board	Great Britain	53.7		6
2	Antónia Munkácsi	Hungary	54.1		5
3	Lyudmila Samotyosova	Soviet Union	54.3		4
4	Czesława Nowak	Poland	54.8	NR	3
5	Helga Henning	West Germany	55.0		2
6	Ingrid Zander	East Germany	56.2		1

=== 800 metres ===
15 September

Rank	Name	Nationality	Time	Notes	Points
1	Laine Erik	Soviet Union	2:06.8		6
2	Danuta Sobieska	Poland	2:07.0		5
3	Anita Rottmüller	West Germany	2:07.2		4
4	Regina Kleinau	East Germany	2:07.5		3
5	Pam Piercy	Great Britain	2:07.8		2
6	Zsuzsa Szabó	Hungary	2:09.1		1

=== 80 metres hurdles ===
15 September – 76.2 cm, 8 m
Wind: +0.8 m/s

Rank	Name	Nationality	Time	Notes	Points
1	Karin Balzer	East Germany	10.8		6
2	Pat Jones	Great Britain	10.9		5
3	Inge Schell	West Germany	11.0		4
4	Lyudmila Ivleva	Soviet Union	11.0		3
5	Teresa Sukniewicz	Poland	11.1		2
6	Annamária Tóth	Hungary	11.2		1

=== 4 × 100 metres relay ===
15 September

Rank	Lane	Nation	Athletes	Time	Note	Points
1	Soviet Union	Galina Bukharina, Liliya Tkachenko, Vera Popkova, Lyudmila Samotyosova	45.0		6	
2	Great Britain	Anita Neil, Maureen Tranter, Jenny Pawsey, Della James	45.3		5	
3	East Germany	Ingrid Tiedtke, Angela Vogel, Christina Heinich, Renate Heldt	45.3		4	
4	Hungary	Margit Nemesházi, Györgyi Balogh, Etelka Kispál, Annamária Tóth	45.3		3	
5	West Germany	Erika Rost, Hannelore Trabert, Karin Frisch, Jutta Stöck	45.6		2	
6	Poland	Teresa Sukniewicz, Urszula Styranka, Lucyna Koczwara, Irena Kirszenstein	46.2		1	

=== High jump ===
15 September

Rank	Name	Nationality	Result	Notes	Points
1	Antonina Okorokova	Soviet Union	1.79		6
2	Rita Schmidt	East Germany	1.70		5
3	Dorothy Shirley	Great Britain	1.67		4
4	Hannelore Görtz	West Germany	1.67		3
5	Maria Zielińska	Poland	1.64		2
6	Anna Noszály	Hungary	1.61		1

=== Long jump ===
15 September

Rank	Name	Nationality	#1	#2	#3	#4	#5	#6	Result	Notes	Points
1	Ingrid Becker	West Germany	4.91	6.33	6.44	x	6.63	x	6.63	NR	6
2	Tatyana Talysheva	Soviet Union	6.34	6.19	6.19	6.24	6.49	6.39	6.49		5
3	Mary Rand	Great Britain	x	6.26	6.18	6.15	x	x	6.26		4
4	Bärbel Löhnert	East Germany	6.18	6.22	4.81	6.19	6.18	6.11	6.22		3
5	Etelka Kispál	Hungary							6.10		2
6	Lucyna Koczwara	Poland							5.37		1

=== Shot put ===
15 September

Rank	Name	Nationality	#1	#2	#3	#4	#5	#6	Result	Notes	Points
1	Nadezhda Chizhova	Soviet Union	18.24	17.79	17.71	18.21	x	17.73	18.24		6
2	Margitta Gummel	East Germany	x	17.66	x	17.36	16.81	16.81	17.66		5
3	Judit Bognár	Hungary							16.58		4
4	Marlene Fuchs	West Germany							15.84		3
5	Brenda Bedford	Great Britain							14.82		2
6	Eugenia Ciarkowska	Poland							14.09		1

=== Discus throw ===
15 September

Rank	Name	Nationality	#1	#2	#3	#4	#5	#6	Result	Notes	Points
1	Karin Illgen	East Germany	x	54.96	56.56	58.26	51.38	51.20	58.26		6
2	Lyudmila Muravyova	Soviet Union	53.70	56.70	54.52	54.22	x	55.76	56.70		5
3	Jolán Kleiber	Hungary	55.72	53.18	54.10	x	53.44	x	55.72		4
4	Liesel Westermann	West Germany	53.78	x	x	x	x	52.42	53.78		3
5	Jadwiga Wojtczak	Poland							50.48		2
6	Rosemary Payne	Great Britain							48.86		1

=== Javelin throw ===
15 September – Old model

Rank	Name	Nationality	Result	Notes	Points
1	Daniela Jaworska	Poland	56.88		6
2	Ameli Koloska	West Germany	54.22		5
3	Ruth Fuchs	East Germany	53.18		4
4	Yelena Gorchakova	Soviet Union	52.78		3
5	Angéla Németh	Hungary	48.80		2
6	Sue Platt	Great Britain	47.00		1
