= 1969 European Indoor Games – Men's 400 metres =

The men's 400 metres event at the 1969 European Indoor Games was held on 9 March in Belgrade.

== Medalists ==
| Gold | Silver | Bronze |
|---|---|---|
| Jan Balachowski; Poland | Jan Werner; Poland | Yuriy Zorin; Soviet Union |

== Results ==
=== Heats ===
The winner of each heat (Q) and the next 1 fastest (q) qualified for the final.

| Rank | Heat | Name | Nationality | Time | Notes |
|---|---|---|---|---|---|
| 1 | 1 | Jan Werner | Poland | 47.6 | Q |
| 2 | 1 | Aleksandr Bratchikov | Soviet Union | 47.9 | |
| 3 | 1 | Willy Vandenwyngaerden | Belgium | 48.1 | |
| 4 | 1 | Peter Bernreuther | West Germany | 48.2 | |
| 1 | 2 | Jan Balachowski | Poland | 47.2 | Q |
| 2 | 2 | Colin Campbell | Great Britain | 47.4 | q |
| 3 | 2 | Rene Salm | Switzerland | 48.0 | |
| 4 | 2 | Tore Nilsson | Sweden | 48.0 | |
| 1 | 3 | Yuriy Zorin | Soviet Union | 47.9 | Q |
| 2 | 3 | Stepan Kremer | Yugoslavia | 48.7 | |
| | 3 | Philippe Clerc | Switzerland | DQ | |

=== Final ===
| Rank | Name | Nationality | Time | Notes |
|---|---|---|---|---|
| 1st place, gold medalist(s) | Jan Balachowski | Poland | 47.3 | |
| 2nd place, silver medalist(s) | Jan Werner | Poland | 47.4 | |
| 3rd place, bronze medalist(s) | Yuriy Zorin | Soviet Union | 47.4 | |
| 4 | Colin Campbell | Great Britain | 47.8 | |
