= 1968 European Indoor Games – Men's 400 metres =

The men's 400 metres event at the 1968 European Indoor Games was held on 10 March in Madrid.

== Medalists ==
Gold	Silver	Bronze
Andrzej Badeński; Poland	Aleksandr Bratchikov; Soviet Union	Jan Balachowski; Poland

== Results ==
=== Heats ===
The winner of each heat (Q) and the next 1 fastest (q) qualified for the final.

Rank	Heat	Name	Nationality	Time	Notes
1	1	Jan Balachowski	Poland	47.50	Q
2	1	Hans Reinermann	West Germany	48.2	
3	1	Ramón Magariños	Spain	48.3	
4	1	Igor Krupička	Czechoslovakia	49.7	
1	2	Colin Campbell	Great Britain	47.74	Q
2	2	Aleksandr Bratchikov	Soviet Union	47.8	q
3	2	Noel Carroll	Ireland	48.7	
1	3	Andrzej Badeński	Poland	47.61	Q
2	3	Manfred Kinder	West Germany	48.5	
3	3	Stepan Kremer	Yugoslavia	49.3	
4	3	José Barceló de Carvalho	Portugal	49.7	

=== Final ===
Rank	Name	Nationality	Time	Notes
1st place, gold medalist(s)	Andrzej Badeński	Poland	47.04	WB
2nd place, silver medalist(s)	Aleksandr Bratchikov	Soviet Union	47.3	
3rd place, bronze medalist(s)	Jan Balachowski	Poland	47.3	
4	Colin Campbell	Great Britain	47.6	
