= 1970 European Athletics Indoor Championships – Men's 400 metres =

The men's 400 metres event at the 1970 European Athletics Indoor Championships was held on 15 March in Vienna.

== Medalists ==
Gold	Silver	Bronze
Aleksandr Bratchikov; Soviet Union	Andrzej Badeński; Poland	Yuriy Zorin; Soviet Union

== Results ==
=== Heats ===
The winner of each heat (Q) and the next 1 fastest (q) qualified for the final.

Rank	Heat	Name	Nationality	Time	Notes
1	1	Andrzej Badeński	Poland	46.6	Q
2	1	Aleksandr Bratchikov	Soviet Union	46.6	q
3	1	Ingo Röper	West Germany	47.3	
1	2	Jan Balachowski	Poland	47.3	Q
2	2	Boris Savchuk	Soviet Union	47.5	
3	2	Ramon Magariños	Spain	48.9	
1	3	Yuriy Zorin	Soviet Union	46.9	Q
2	3	Wolfgang Müller	East Germany	46.9	
3	3	Fanahan McSweeney	Ireland	47.0	

=== Final ===
Rank	Name	Nationality	Time	Notes
1st place, gold medalist(s)	Aleksandr Bratchikov	Soviet Union	46.8	
2nd place, silver medalist(s)	Andrzej Badeński	Poland	46.9	
3rd place, bronze medalist(s)	Yuriy Zorin	Soviet Union	48.4	
	Jan Balachowski	Poland	DNF	
