= 1969 European Indoor Games – Men's 4 × 390 metres relay =

The men's 4 × 390 metres relay event at the 1969 European Indoor Games was held on 8 March in Belgrade. Each athlete ran two laps of the 195 metres track.

== Results ==
Rank	Nation	Competitors	Time	Notes
1st place, gold medalist(s)	Poland	Jan Werner; Jan Radomski; Andrzej Badeński; Jan Balachowski	3:01.9	
2nd place, silver medalist(s)	Soviet Union	Leonid Mikishev; Aleksandr Bratchikov; Valeriy Borzov; Yuriy Zorin	3:01.9	
3rd place, bronze medalist(s)	West Germany	Dieter Hübner; Herbert Moser; Peter Bernreuther; Manfred Kinder	3:04.5	
4	Yugoslavia	Luciano Sušanj; Istvan Danko; Miro Kocuvan; Stjepan Kremer	3:09.1	
