= 1967 European Indoor Games – Men's medley relay =

The men's 150 + 300 + 450 + 600 medley relay event at the 1967 European Indoor Games was held on 11 and 12 March in Prague. The first athlete ran one lap of the 150-metre track, the second two, the third three and the anchor four, thus 10 laps or 1500 metres in total.

== Results ==
=== Heats ===
First 2 teams in each heat (Q) qualified directly for the final.

Rank	Heat	Nation	Competitors	Time	Notes
1	1	Soviet Union	Borys Savchuk; Vasyl Anisimov; Aleksandr Bratchikov; Valeriy Frolov	3:17.2	Q
2	1	Czechoslovakia	Jiří Kynos; Ladislav Kříž; Pavel Hruška; Pavel Pěnkava	3:19.0	Q
	1	Spain	José Luis Sánchez; Alfonso Gabernet; Álvaro González; Enrique Bondia	DNF	
1	2	Poland	Marian Dudziak; Zbysław Anielak; Jan Werner; Andrzej Badeński	3:12.5	Q
2	2	West Germany	Gert Metz; Horst Haßlinger; Rolf Krüsmann; Manfred Hanika	3:13.1	Q
3	2	Yugoslavia	Jovan Mušković; Ivica Karasi; Zlatko Levar; Jože Međimurec	3:14.9	
4	2	Hungary	István Bátori; László Mihályfi; Gyula Rábai; László Horváth	3:17.6	

=== Final ===
Rank	Nation	Competitors	Time	Notes
1st place, gold medalist(s)	West Germany	Gert Metz; Horst Haßlinger; Rolf Krüsmann; Manfred Hanika	3:06.6	
2nd place, silver medalist(s)	Soviet Union	Borys Savchuk; Vasyl Anisimov; Aleksandr Bratchikov; Valeriy Frolov	3:06.9	
3rd place, bronze medalist(s)	Czechoslovakia	Jiří Kynos; Ladislav Kříž; Pavel Hruška; Pavel Pěnkava	3:08.8	
	Poland	Marian Dudziak; Zbysław Anielak; Jan Werner; Andrzej Badeński	DNF	
