= 1968 European Indoor Games – Men's 4 × 364 metres relay =

The men's 4 × 364 metres relay event at the 1968 European Indoor Games was held on 9 March in Madrid. Each athlete ran two laps of the 182 metres track.

== Results ==
Rank	Nation	Competitors	Time	Notes
1st place, gold medalist(s)	Poland	Waldemar Korycki; Jan Balachowski; Jan Werner; Andrzej Badeński	2:48.9	
2nd place, silver medalist(s)	West Germany	Horst Daverkausen; Peter Bernreuther; Ingo Roper; Martin Jellinghaus	2:49.7	
3rd place, bronze medalist(s)	Soviet Union	Boris Savchuk; Vasyl Anisimov; Sergey Abalichin; Aleksandr Bratchikov	2:51.1	
