= 1968 European Indoor Games – Men's medley relay =

The men's 182 + 364 + 546 + 728 medley relay event at the 1968 European Indoor Games was held on 10 March in Madrid. The first athlete ran one lap of the 182-metre track, the second two, the third three and the anchor four, thus 10 laps or 1820 metres in total.

== Results ==
Rank	Nation	Competitors	Time	Notes
1st place, gold medalist(s)	Soviet Union	Aleksandr Lebedev; Boris Savchuk; Igor Potapchenko; Sergey Kryuchok	3:52.2	
2nd place, silver medalist(s)	Poland	Marian Dudziak; Waldemar Korycki; Andrzej Badeński; Edmund Borowski	3:54.6	
3rd place, bronze medalist(s)	Spain	José Luis Sánchez Paraíso; Ramon Magarinos; Alfonso Gabernet; José María Reina	4:02.8	
	Czechoslovakia	Petr Utekal; Ladislav Kříž; Pavel Hruška; Jan Kasal	DNF	
