= 1971 European Athletics Indoor Championships – Men's 400 metres =

The men's 400 metres event at the 1971 European Athletics Indoor Championships was held on 13 and 14 March in Sofia.

== Medalists ==
Gold	Silver	Bronze
Andrzej Badeński; Poland	Boris Savchuk; Soviet Union	Aleksandr Bratchikov; Soviet Union

== Results ==
=== Heats ===
Held on 13 March

First 2 from each heat (Q) qualified directly for the semifinals.

Rank	Heat	Name	Nationality	Time	Notes
1	1	Andrzej Badeński	Poland	48.4	Q
2	1	Lionel Malingre	France	48.6	Q
3	1	Luis Sarría	Spain	48.8	
1	2	Yevgeniy Borisenko	Soviet Union	48.6	Q
2	2	Peter Bernreuther	West Germany	48.7	Q
3	2	Krestyu Khristov	Bulgaria	49.0	
1	3	Aleksandr Bratchikov	Soviet Union	48.4	Q
2	3	Jan Balachowski	Poland	48.4	Q
3	3	Ramon Magariños	Spain	50.3	
1	4	Boris Savchuk	Soviet Union	48.3	Q
2	4	Manuel Gayoso	Spain	48.7	Q
3	4	Gilles Bertould	France	49.0	

=== Semifinals ===
Held on 13 March

First 2 from each heat (Q) qualified directly for the final.

Rank	Heat	Name	Nationality	Time	Notes
1	1	Andrzej Badeński	Poland	47.8	Q
2	1	Boris Savchuk	Soviet Union	48.2	Q
3	1	Peter Bernreuther	West Germany	48.9	
4	1	Lionel Malingre	France	51.2	
1	2	Jan Balachowski	Poland	48.6	Q
2	2	Aleksandr Bratchikov	Soviet Union	48.8	Q
3	2	Manuel Gayoso	Spain	48.9	
4	2	Yevgeniy Borisenko	Soviet Union	49.9	

=== Final ===
Held on 14 March

Rank	Name	Nationality	Time	Notes
1st place, gold medalist(s)	Andrzej Badeński	Poland	46.8	=AR
2nd place, silver medalist(s)	Boris Savchuk	Soviet Union	47.4	
3rd place, bronze medalist(s)	Aleksandr Bratchikov	Soviet Union	47.6	
	Jan Balachowski	Poland	DNS	
