= Athletics at the 1967 Summer Universiade – Men's 400 metres =

The men's 400 metres event at the 1967 Summer Universiade was held at the National Olympic Stadium in Tokyo on 30 and 31 August 1967.

== Medalists ==
Gold	Silver	Bronze
Ingo Röper; West Germany	Helmar Müller; West Germany	Ippolito Giani; Italy

== Results ==
=== Heats ===
Rank	Heat	Athlete	Nationality	Time	Notes
1	1	Masami Yoshida	Japan	47.6	Q
2	1	Sergio Bello	Italy	48.0	Q
3	1	Ramón Magariños	Spain	48.3	q
4	1	Luís Silva	Portugal	49.8	
5	1	Paulo Bergamasco	Brazil	50.0	
	1	Wong Kun Kim	Hong Kong	?	
1	2	Ingo Röper	West Germany	46.7	Q
2	2	Jim Barry	Great Britain	47.6	Q
3	2	Bruno Bianchi	Italy	47.8	q
4	2	Nipon Pensuvapap	Thailand	48.8	
5	2	Hugo Cury Lisboa	Brazil	48.9	
6	2	Fu Chi Cheung	Hong Kong	54.8	
1	3	Howard Davies	Great Britain	47.8	Q
2	3	Helmar Müller	West Germany	48.5	Q
3	3	Pierre Gaudry	France	49.0	
4	3	Akitoshi Inoue	Japan	49.3	
5	3	Charun Vansanit	Thailand	51.7	
6	3	Edgar Javier	Philippines	54.3	

=== Final ===
Rank	Name	Nationality	Time	Notes
1st place, gold medalist(s)	Ingo Röper	West Germany	46.0	
2nd place, silver medalist(s)	Helmar Müller	West Germany	46.6	
3rd place, bronze medalist(s)	Sergio Bello	Italy	46.7	=PB
4	Howard Davies	Great Britain	47.0	
5	Masami Yoshida	Japan	47.4	
6	Jim Barry	Great Britain	47.4	
7	Bruno Bianchi	Italy	47.8	
8	Ramón Magariños	Spain	47.9	
