= 1966 European Athletics Championships – Men's 400 metres =

Men's 400 metres at the European Athletics Championships

The men's 400 metres at the 1966 European Athletics Championships was held in Budapest, Hungary, at Népstadion on 30 and 31 August, and 1 September 1966.

== Medalists ==
Gold	Stanisław Grędziński; Poland
Silver	Andrzej Badeński; Poland
Bronze	Manfred Kinder; West Germany

== Results ==
=== Final ===
1 September

Rank	Name	Nationality	Time	Notes
1st place, gold medalist(s)	Stanisław Grędziński	Poland	46.0	
2nd place, silver medalist(s)	Andrzej Badeński	Poland	46.2	
3rd place, bronze medalist(s)	Manfred Kinder	West Germany	46.3	
4	Wilfried Weiland	East Germany	46.6	
5	Rolf Krüsmann	West Germany	46.7	
6	Josef Trousil	Czechoslovakia	46.9	
7	Tim Graham	Great Britain	46.9	
	Siegfried König	West Germany	DNF	

=== Semi-finals ===
31 August

==== Semi-final 1 ====
Rank	Name	Nationality	Time	Notes
1	Stanisław Grędziński	Poland	46.3	Q
2	Manfred Kinder	West Germany	46.6	Q
3	Josef Trousil	Czechoslovakia	46.6	Q
4	Tim Graham	Great Britain	46.7	Q
5	Boris Savchuk	Soviet Union	46.9	
6	Martin Winbolt-Lewis	Great Britain	47.0	
7	Sergio Bello	Italy	47.1	
8	Bernard Martin	France	47.7	

==== Semi-final 2 ====
Rank	Name	Nationality	Time	Notes
1	Andrzej Badeński	Poland	46.6	Q
2	Wilfried Weiland	East Germany	46.8	Q
3	Rolf Krüsmann	West Germany	46.8	Q
4	Siegfried König	West Germany	47.1	Q
5	Jean-Pierre Boccardo	France	47.5	
6	Hryhoriy Sverbetov	Soviet Union	47.6	
7	Heikki Pippola	Finland	48.0	
8	John Adey	Great Britain	48.0	

=== Heats ===
30 August

==== Heat 1 ====
Rank	Name	Nationality	Time	Notes
1	Andrzej Badeński	Poland	46.7	Q
2	Jean-Pierre Boccardo	France	47.1	Q
3	Heikki Pippola	Finland	47.3	Q
4	Michael Zerbes	East Germany	47.5	
5	Aleksandr Ivanov	Soviet Union	48.0	
6	Nikolaos Rengoukos	Greece	48.3	
7	Mehmet Gesas	Turkey	49.9	

==== Heat 2 ====
Rank	Name	Nationality	Time	Notes
1	Siegfried König	West Germany	46.7	Q
2	Wilfried Weiland	East Germany	46.9	Q
3	Hryhoriy Sverbetov	Soviet Union	47.3	Q
4	Fred van Herpen	Netherlands	47.8	
5	Jacques Pennewaert	Belgium	48.9	
6	Vincenc Kacagjeli	Albania	49.3	

==== Heat 3 ====
Rank	Name	Nationality	Time	Notes
1	Stanisław Grędziński	Poland	46.6	Q
2	Tim Graham	Great Britain	47.0	Q
3	Sergio Bello	Italy	47.1	Q
4	Josef Trousil	Czechoslovakia	47.2	Q
5	Günther Klann	East Germany	47.5	
6	Zlatko Valchev	Bulgaria	47.9	

==== Heat 4 ====
Rank	Name	Nationality	Time	Notes
1	Manfred Kinder	West Germany	47.0	Q
2	John Adey	Great Britain	47.4	Q
3	Bernard Martin	France	47.5	Q
4	Edmund Borowski	Poland	47.6	
5	Carl Fredrik Bunæs	Norway	47.8	
6	Bo Althoff	Sweden	48.4	

==== Heat 5 ====
Rank	Name	Nationality	Time	Notes
1	Boris Savchuk	Soviet Union	46.9	Q
2	Rolf Krüsmann	West Germany	47.1	Q
3	Martin Winbolt-Lewis	Great Britain	47.4	Q
4	Michel Samper	France	47.4	
5	Furio Fusi	Italy	48.2	

== Participation ==
According to an unofficial count, 30 athletes from 17 countries participated in the event.

- Albania (1)
- Belgium (1)
- Bulgaria (1)
- Czechoslovakia (1)
- East Germany (3)
- Finland (1)
- France (3)
- Greece (1)
- Italy (2)
- Netherlands (1)
- Norway (1)
- Poland (3)
- Soviet Union (3)
- Sweden (1)
- Turkey (1)
- Great Britain (3)
- West Germany (3)
