= Edmund Borowski =

Polish sprinter (1945–2022)

Medal record

Men's athletics

Representing Poland

European Championships
Gold medal – first place	1966 Budapest	4 × 400 m relay

European Indoor Championships
Silver medal – second place	1967 Prague	4 × 300 m relay
Silver medal – second place	1968 Madrid	Medley relay
Silver medal – second place	1970 Vienna	Medley relay

Edmund Borowski (23 January 1945 – 22 August 2022) was a Polish sprinter who specialized in the 400 metres.

At the 1966 European Championships he won a gold medal in the 4 × 400 metres relay together with Jan Werner, Stanisław Grędziński and Andrzej Badeński. At the 1967 European Indoor Games he won a silver medal in the 4 × 300 metres relay, which he ran together with Edward Romanowski, Ján Balachowski and Tadeusz Jaworski. At the 1968 European Indoor Games he won a silver medal in the medley relay, which he ran with Marian Dudziak, Waldemar Korycki and Andrzej Badeński. Another silver medal in medley relay followed at the 1970 European Indoor Championships, this time together with Stanisław Waśkiewicz, Kazimierz Wardak and Eryk Żelazny.

Borowski died on 22 August 2022, at the age of 77; he had previously been battling with cancer.

== International competitions ==
Year	Competition	Venue	Position	Event	Notes
Representing Poland
1966	European Championships	Budapest, Hungary	20th (h)	400 m	47.6
1966	European Championships	Budapest, Hungary	1st	4 × 400 m relay	3:04.5
1967	European Indoor Games	Madrid, Spain	2nd	4 × 300 m relay	2:20.2
1967	European Cup Final	Kiev, Soviet Union	1st	4 × 400 m relay	3:04.4
1968	European Indoor Games	Madrid, Spain	1st	Medley relay	3:54.6
1970	European Indoor Championships	Vienna, Austria	2nd	Medley relay	6:18.8
1970	European Cup Final	Stockholm, Sweden	1st	4 × 400 m relay	3:05.1

^{1}Did not finish in the final

== Personal bests ==
Outdoor

- 100 metres – 10.4h (Szczecin 1967)
- 200 metres – 21.1h (Bydgoszcz 1967)
- 400 metres – 46.5h (Warsaw 1970)

Indoor

- 400 metres – 49.6h (1972)
