= 1966 European Athletics Championships – Men's 4 × 400 metres relay =

Men's 4 × 400 metres relay at the European Athletics Championships

The men's 4 × 400 metres relay at the 1966 European Athletics Championships was held in Budapest, Hungary, at Népstadion on 3 and 4 September 1966.

== Medalists ==
Gold	Jan Werner; Edmund Borowski; Stanisław Grędziński; Andrzej Badeński; Poland
Silver	Friedrich Roderfeld; Jens Ulbricht; Rolf Krüsmann; Manfred Kinder; West Germany
Bronze	Joachim Both; Günther Klann; Michael Zerbes; Wilfried Weiland; East Germany

== Results ==
=== Final ===
4 September

Rank	Nation	Competitors	Time	Notes
1st place, gold medalist(s)	Poland	Jan Werner; Edmund Borowski; Stanisław Grędziński; Andrzej Badeński	3:04.5	CR NR
2nd place, silver medalist(s)	West Germany	Friedrich Roderfeld; Jens Ulbricht; Rolf Krüsmann; Manfred Kinder	3:04.8	
3rd place, bronze medalist(s)	East Germany	Joachim Both; Günther Klann; Michael Zerbes; Wilfried Weiland	3:05.7	NR
4	France	Jean-Pierre Boccardo; Jean-Claude Nallet; Robert Poirier; Michel Samper	3:05.7	NR
5	Great Britain	John Adey; John Sherwood; Martin Winbolt-Lewis; Tim Graham	3:05.9	
6	Italy	Bruno Bianchi; Roberto Frinolli; Furio Fusi; Sergio Bello	3:06.5	NR
7	Czechoslovakia	Josef Hegyes; Jaromír Haisl; Pavel Penkava; Josef Trousil	3:09.3	
8	Hungary	László Horváth; Imre Nemesházi; Gyula Rábai; István Bátori	3:10.3	

=== Heats ===
3 September

==== Heat 1 ====
Rank	Nation	Competitors	Time	Notes
1	West Germany	Jens Ulbricht; Manfred Kinder; Rolf Krüsmann; Friedrich Roderfeld	3:07.1	Q
2	Great Britain	John Adey; John Sherwood; Martin Winbolt-Lewis; Tim Graham	3:07.2	Q
3	Hungary	István Bátori; Gyula Rábai; László Horváth; István Gyulai	3:07.9	Q
4	Czechoslovakia	Josef Trousil; Josef Hegyes; Jaromír Haisl; Ladislav Kříž	3:08.1	Q
5	Soviet Union	Hryhoriy Sverbetov; Aleksandr Ivanov; Vasyl Anisimov; Boris Savchuk	3:09.3	
6	Greece	Nikolaos Regoukos; Dimosthenis Koutsoulis; Konstantinos Mihailidis; Athanasios Vogiatzis	3:14.2	

==== Heat 2 ====
Rank	Nation	Competitors	Time	Notes
1	Poland	Andrzej Badeński; Stanisław Grędziński; Edmund Borowski; Jan Werner	3:14.8	Q
2	East Germany	Wilfried Weiland; Michael Zerbes; Joachim Both; Günther Klann	3:17.0	Q
3	France	Jean-Pierre Boccardo; Michel Samper; Robert Poirier; Jean-Claude Nallet	3:17.4	Q
4	Italy	Sergio Bello; Bruno Bianchi; Roberto Frinolli; Furio Fusi	3:17.4	Q

== Participation ==
According to an unofficial count, 42 athletes from 10 countries participated in the event.

- Czechoslovakia (5)
- East Germany (4)
- France (4)
- Greece (4)
- Hungary (5)
- Italy (4)
- Poland (4)
- Soviet Union (4)
- Great Britain (4)
- West Germany (4)
