= 1970 European Athletics Indoor Championships – Men's 4 × 400 metres relay =

The men's 4 × 400 metres relay event at the 1970 European Athletics Indoor Championships was held on 14 March in Vienna. Each athlete ran two laps of the 200 metres track.

== Results ==
Rank	Nation	Competitors	Time	Notes
1st place, gold medalist(s)	Soviet Union	Yevgeniy Borisenko; Yuriy Zorin; Boris Savchuk; Aleksandr Bratchikov	3:05.9	WB
2nd place, silver medalist(s)	Poland	Jan Werner; Stanisław Grędziński; Jan Balachowski; Andrzej Badeński	3:07.5	
3rd place, bronze medalist(s)	West Germany	Dieter Hübner; Karl-Hermann Tofaute; Ulrich Strohhacker; Helmar Müller	3:10.7	
4	Austria	Ekkehard Kolodziejczak; Christian Artaker; Robert Kropiunik; Alfred Wolf	3:21.6	
