= Ostrzyca =

Ostrzyca may refer to:

- Ostrzyca (hill), an extinct volcano in southwestern Poland
- Ostrzyca, Lublin Voivodeship, a village in eastern Poland
- Ostrzyca, West Pomeranian Voivodeship, a village in northwestern Poland
