= 1969 European Indoor Games – Men's medley relay =

The men's 195 + 390 + 585 + 780 metres medley relay event at the 1969 European Indoor Games was held on 9 March in Belgrade. The first athlete ran one lap of the 195-metre track, the second two, the third three and the anchor four, thus 10 laps or 1950 metres in total.

== Results ==
Rank	Nation	Competitors	Time	Notes
1st place, gold medalist(s)	Poland	Edward Romanowski; Andrzej Badeński; Henryk Szordykowski; Jan Radomski	4:16.4	
	Yugoslavia	?, ?, ?, ?	DNF	
