= 1971 European Athletics Indoor Championships – Men's 4 × 400 metres relay =

The men's 4 × 400 metres relay event at the 1971 European Athletics Indoor Championships was held on 14 March in Sofia. Each athlete ran two laps of the 200 metres track.

== Results ==
Rank	Nation	Competitors	Time	Notes
1st place, gold medalist(s)	Poland	Waldemar Korycki; Jan Werner; Andrzej Badeński; Jan Balachowski	3:11.1	
2nd place, silver medalist(s)	Soviet Union	Aleksandr Bratchikov; Semyon Kocher; Boris Savchuk; Yevgeniy Borisenko	3:11.9	
3rd place, bronze medalist(s)	Bulgaria	Krestyu Khristov; Alexander Yanev; Alexander Popov; Yordan Todorov	3:15.6	NR
