= 1966 European Junior Games =

- Level: Under 20
- Events: 33

The 1966 European Junior Games was the second edition of the biennial athletics competition for European athletes aged under twenty. It was the first edition to have received official support from the European Athletic Association, following the unofficial first edition in 1964. The event was held at the Central Stadium Chornomorets in Odessa, Ukrainian SSR, Soviet Union, on 24 and 25 September.

== Men's results ==
Event	Gold		Silver		Bronze	
100 metres	Bernd Jacob (FRG)	10.7	Jochen Eigenherr (FRG)	10.7	Gérard Coupat (FRA)	10.8
200 metres	Jochen Eigenherr (FRG)	21.0	Jean-Claude Nallet (FRA)	21.3	István Batori (HUN)	21.5
400 metres	Aleksandr Bratchikov (URS)	47.3	István Batori (HUN)	47.5	Jan Balachowski (POL)	47.8
800 metres	Bernard Hebert (FRA)	1:51.5	Jaroslav Včeliš (TCH)	1:51.6	Dieter Fromm (GDR)	1:51.9
1500 metres	Roberto Gervasini (ITA)	3:51.0	Werner Gosewinkel (FRG)	3:51.2	Vladan Đorđević (YUG)	3:52.6
3000 metres	Klaus Tietz (GDR)	8:22.4	Gerhard Fontana (FRG)	8:23.0	Jan-Olof Nilsson (SWE)	8:23.2
110 m hurdles	Yuriy Gorskiy (URS)	14.6	Aleksandr Demus (URS)	14.6	Dan Hidiosanu (ROM)	14.7
400 m hurdles	Mikhail Dolgy (URS)	53.3	Viktor Basilevich (URS)	53.4	Michel Montgermont (FRA)	53.5
1500 m s'chase	Otto Knarr (FRG)	4:09.7	Ulrich Hobeck (GDR)	4:10.8	Kazimierz Maranda (POL)	4:11.6
10,000 m walk	Mikhail Yefimovich (URS)	46:53.0	Aleksandr Popov (URS)	47:10.8	Vladislav Boháč (TCH)	47:31.0
4 × 100 m relay	France (FRA); Gérard Coupat; Charles Tétaria; Jean-Claude Nallet; Charles Ducasse	40.6	West Germany (FRG); Heiko Griese; Hartmut Menzel; Bernd Jacob; Joachim Eigenherr	40.8	Poland (POL); Tadeusz Rostek; Henryk Cieciora; Andrzej Nowak; Stanisław Wagner	41.0
4 × 400 m relay	Soviet Union (URS); Aleksander Ogorodnikov; Mikhail Dolgy; Viktor Lipagin; Aleksandr Bratchikov	3:14.3	Poland (POL); Waldemar Pyrzyński; Wiesław Stryczek; Stanisław Waśkiewicz; Jan Balachowski	3:14.7	Yugoslavia (YUG); Jovan Mušković; Stojan Puač; Miloš Bucevski; Istvan Danko	3:16.1
Pole vault	Antti Kalliomäki (FIN)	4.60	Heinfried Engel (FRG)	4.60	Zygmunt Dobrosz (POL)	4.60
High jump	Bo Jonsson (SWE)	2.06	Anatoliy Moroz (URS)	2.03	Rudolf Baudis (TCH)	2.03
Long jump	Max Klauss (GDR)	7.59	Vladimir Skibenko (URS)	7.57	Marcin Święcicki (POL)	7.33
Triple jump	Anatoliy Kaynov (URS)	15.97	Nikolay Dudkin (URS)	15.75	Carol Corbu (ROM)	15.43
Shot put	Aleksander Tammert (URS)	16.71	Hans-Peter Gies (GDR)	16.55	František Žemba (TCH)	15.79
Discus throw	Ferenc Tégla (HUN)	52.92	Klaus-Peter Hennig (FRG)	52.20	František Žemba (TCH)	49.98
Hammer throw	Yuriy Ashmarin (URS)	60.94	Reinhard Theimer (GDR)	60.10	Vladimir Ambrosyev (URS)	56.28
Javelin throw (old model)	Renzo Cramerotti (ITA)	73.32	Harry Abraham (FRG)	72.88	Valeriy Belan (URS)	71.18
Decathlon	Viktor Chelnokov (URS)	7225 pts	Hans Nerlich (FRG)	7138 pts	Joachim Kirst (GDR)	6845 pts

== Women's results ==
Event	Gold		Silver		Bronze	
100 metres	Brigitte Geyer (GDR)	12.2	Ljiljana Petnjaric (YUG)	12.2	Else Hadrup (DEN)	12.2
200 metres	Christina Heinich (GDR)	24.2	Nicole Montandon (FRA)	24.3	Mirna Jansen (NED)	24.5
400 metres	Ljiljana Petnjarić (YUG)	55.9	Wil Wokke (NED)	56.2	Ingrida Verbele (URS)	56.7
800 metres	Vera Nikolić (YUG)	2:03.4	Eeva-Liisa Kalliolahti (FIN)	2:08.1	Barbara Wieck (GDR)	2:09.0
80 m hurdles	Meta Antenen (SUI)	11.1	Teresa Sukniewicz (POL)	11.3	Nadezhda Betska (URS)	11.3
4 × 100 m relay	East Germany (GDR); Bärbel Schrickel; Renate Meissner; Brigitte Geyer; Christina Heinich	46.2	France (FRA); Dominique Descatoire; Jacqueline Peruzetto; Marie-France Vincent; Nicole Montandon	46.6	Soviet Union (URS); Nadezhda Shelsara; Nadezhda Besfamilnaya; Yelena Molodtsova; Marina Nikiforova	46.9
High jump	Alena Prosková (TCH)	1.64	Valentyna Kozyr (URS)	1.61	Gun Nordlund (FIN)	1.61
Long jump	Tamara Kapysheva (URS)	5.98	Ivanka Koshnicharska (BUL)	5.97	Maria Solomon (ROM)	5.82
Shot put	Lyubov Kostushenko (URS)	14.25	Hannelore Friedel (GDR)	14.24	Barbara Schubert (GDR)	13.84
Discus throw	Hannelore Friedel (GDR)	46.56	Vladimíra Srbová (TCH)	45.62	Zsuzsa Nyitrai (HUN)	44.94
Javelin throw (old model)	Kaisa Launela (FIN)	51.82	Marilena Ciurea (ROM)	50.50	Ewa Gryziecka (POL)	48.14
Pentathlon	Meta Antenen (SUI)	4609 pts	Britt Johansson (SWE)	4370 pts	Margit Papp (HUN)	4319 pts

== Medal table ==
* Host nation (Soviet Union)

Rank	Nation	Gold	Silver	Bronze	Total
1	Soviet Union (URS)*	11	7	5	23
2	East Germany (GDR)	6	4	4	14
3	West Germany (FRG)	3	8	0	11
4	France (FRA)	2	3	2	7
5	Yugoslavia (YUG)	2	1	2	5
6	Finland (FIN)	2	1	1	4
7	Italy (ITA)	2	0	0	2
7	Switzerland (SUI)	2	0	0	2
9	Czechoslovakia (TCH)	1	2	4	7
10	Hungary (HUN)	1	1	3	5
11	Sweden (SWE)	1	1	1	3
12	Poland (POL)	0	2	6	8
13	Romania (ROM)	0	1	3	4
14	Netherlands (NED)	0	1	1	2
15	Bulgaria (BUL)	0	1	0	1
16	Denmark (DEN)	0	0	1	1
Totals (16 entries)		33	33	33	99
