= Andrzej Badeński =

Polish sprinter (1943–2008)

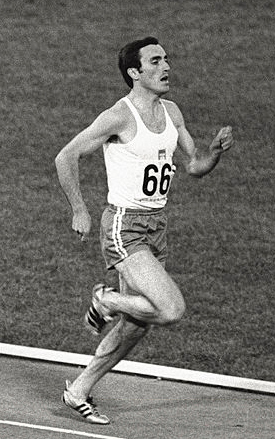
- Andrzej Badeński at the 1968 Olympics

Personal information
- Born: 10 May 1943 Warsaw, German-occupied Poland
- Died: 28 September 2008 (aged 65) Wiesbaden, Germany
- Height: 1.73 m (5 ft 8 in)
- Weight: 68 kg (150 lb)

Sport
- Sport: Sprint running
- Club: Legia Warszawa

Achievements and titles
- Personal best: 400 m – 45.42 (1968)
Medal record
Men's athletics
Representing Poland
Olympic Games
Bronze medal – third place	1964 Tokyo	400 m
European Championships
Gold medal – first place	1966 Budapest	4×400 m
Silver medal – second place	1966 Budapest	400 m
Silver medal – second place	1971 Helsinki	4×400 m
European Indoor Championships
Gold medal – first place	1968 Madrid	400 m
Gold medal – first place	1968 Madrid	4×364 m
Gold medal – first place	1969 Belgrade	4×390 m
Gold medal – first place	1969 Belgrade	Medley relay
Gold medal – first place	1971 Sofia	400 m
Gold medal – first place	1971 Sofia	4×400 m
Gold medal – first place	1972 Grenoble	4×400 m
Silver medal – second place	1970 Vienna	400 m
Silver medal – second place	1970 Vienna	4×400 m

Andrzej Stanisław Badeński (10 May 1943 – 28 September 2008) was a Polish sprinter who specialized in the 400 metres. He won a bronze medal in that event at the 1964 Summer Olympics, and won the gold medal in that event at the European Indoor Championships in 1968 and in 1971.

== Career ==
Badeński was born in Warsaw and represented the club Legia Warszawa. At the 1962 European Championships he finished sixth in the 400 metres. He did however win few international accolades before winning the bronze medal in the 400 metres at the 1964 Olympic Games. At the same Olympics he finished sixth in the 4×400 metres relay together with the Polish team. At the 1966 European Championships he won a silver medal in the 400 metres, only behind Stanislaw Gredzinski, and won the 4×400 metres relay together with Jan Werner, Edmund Borowski and Stanislaw Gredzinski.

After this, his greatest success would come in the regional indoor championships. At the 1967 European Indoor Games he competed in the relay final, but the team did not finish, and at the 1968 European Indoor Games he won a gold medal in the relay. He also won the individual distance at the 1968 European Indoor Games, and two relay gold medals at the 1969 European Indoor Games.

His second Olympic Games were in 1968. He finished seventh in the 400 metres. In the 4×400 metres relay he finished fourth together with Stanislaw Gredzinski, Jan Balachowski and Jan Werner. With the same team members he finished fourth in the relay at the 1969 European Championships. In the individual distance he finished sixth. At the 1970 European Indoor Championships he won two silver medals; in the individual distance as well as in relay. At the 1971 European Indoor Championships he won gold medals in both these events, the latter together with Waldemar Korycki, Jan Werner and Jan Balachowski. With the same team members he won a silver medal in the relay at the 1971 European Championships and a gold medal at the 1972 European Indoor Championships. At the 1972 Olympic Games he reached the semi-final in the 400 metres and finished fifth in the relay.

He became Polish 400 metres champion in 1962, 1963, 1964, 1965 and 1967, and in 1971 he became American indoor champion in the 600 yards event. His personal best time in the 400 metres was 45.42 seconds, achieved in 1968. At the end of his career in 1974 he defected to the West and lived in Germany until his death. He died near Wiesbaden in September 2008.

== International competitions ==
Year	Competition	Venue	Position	Event	Notes
Representing Poland
1962	European Championships	Belgrade, Yugoslavia	6th	400 m	47.4
1962	European Championships	Belgrade, Yugoslavia	6th (h)	4 × 400 m relay	3:10.2
1964	Olympic Games	Tokyo, Japan	3rd	400 m	45.64
1964	Olympic Games	Tokyo, Japan	6th	4 × 400 m relay	3:05.3
1965	European Cup Final	Stuttgart, West Germany	1st	400 m	45.9
1965	European Cup Final	Stuttgart, West Germany	2nd	4 × 400 m relay	3:08.7
1966	European Championships	Budapest, Hungary	2nd	400 m	46.2
1966	European Championships	Budapest, Hungary	1st	4 × 400 m relay	3:04.5
1967	European Indoor Games	Prague, Czechoslovakia	1st (h)	Medley relay	3:12.5^{1}
1967	European Cup Final	Kiev, Soviet Union	3rd	400 m	46.8
1967	European Cup Final	Kiev, Soviet Union	1st	4 × 400 m relay	3:04.4
1968	European Indoor Games	Belgrade, Yugoslavia	1st	400 m	47.04
1968	European Indoor Games	Belgrade, Yugoslavia	1st	4 × 364 m relay	2:48.9
1968	European Indoor Games	Belgrade, Yugoslavia	2nd	Medley relay	3:54.6
1968	Olympic Games	Mexico City, Mexico	7th	400 m	45.42
1968	Olympic Games	Mexico City, Mexico	4th	4 × 400 m relay	3:00.5
1969	European Indoor Games	Belgrade, Yugoslavia	1st	4 × 390 m relay	3:01.9
1969	European Indoor Games	Belgrade, Yugoslavia	1st	Medley relay	4:16.4
1969	European Championships	Athens, Greece	6th	400 m	46.09
1969	European Championships	Athens, Greece	4th	4 × 400 m relay	3:03.16
1970	European Indoor Championships	Vienna, Austria	2nd	400 m	46.9
1970	European Indoor Championships	Vienna, Austria	2nd	4 × 400 m relay	3:07.5
1970	European Cup Final	Stockholm, Sweden	1st	4 × 400 m relay	3:05.1
1971	European Indoor Championships	Sofia, Bulgaria	1st	400 m	46.8
1971	European Indoor Championships	Sofia, Bulgaria	1st	4 × 400 m relay	3:11.1
1971	European Championships	Helsinki, Finland	10th (sf)	400 m	46.80
1971	European Championships	Helsinki, Finland	2nd	4 × 400 m relay	3:03.64
1972	European Indoor Championships	Grenoble, France	1st	4 × 360 m relay	3:11.1
1972	Olympic Games	Munich, West Germany	14th (sf)	100 m	46.38
1972	Olympic Games	Munich, West Germany	5th	4 × 400 m relay	3:01.05

^{1}Did not finish in the final

== Personal bests ==
Outdoor

- 100 metres – 10.4h (Radom 1966)
- 200 metres – 20.7h (Jena 1964)
- 400 metres – 45.42 A (Mexico City 1968)

Indoor

- 400 metres – 46.6h (Madrid 1968)
