= Jan Balachowski =

Polish sprinter (born 1948)

Medal record

Men's athletics

Representing Poland

European Championships
| Silver medal – second place | 1971 Helsinki | 4 × 400 m relay |

European Indoor Championships
| Gold medal – first place | 1968 Madrid | 4 × 364 m relay |
| Gold medal – first place | 1969 Belgrade | 400 m |
| Gold medal – first place | 1969 Belgrade | 4 × 390 m relay |
| Gold medal – first place | 1971 Sofia | 4 × 400 m relay |
| Gold medal – first place | 1972 Grenoble | 4 × 400 m relay |
| Silver medal – second place | 1967 Prague | 4 × 300 m relay |
| Silver medal – second place | 1970 Vienna | 4 × 400 m relay |
| Bronze medal – third place | 1968 Madrid | 400 m |

Jan Balachowski (born 28 December 1948) is a retired Polish sprinter who specialized in the 400 metres.

He was born in Kraków and represented the club Cracovia Kraków. At the 1966 European Junior Championships he won a bronze medal in the 400 metres, as well as a silver medal in the 4 × 400 metres relay.

At the 1967 European Indoor Games he won a silver medal in the 4 × 300 metres relay, which he ran together with Edward Romanowski, Edmund Borowski and Tadeusz Jaworski. At the 1968 European Indoor Games he won a bronze medal in the 400 metres and a gold medal in the 4 × 364 metres relay. In the summer he competed at the 1968 Olympic Games, reaching the quarter-finals in the individual contest and finishing fourth in the final of the 4 × 400 metres relay. At the 1969 European Indoor Games he won a gold medal in the 400 metres and another gold medal in the 4 × 390 metres relay. At the 1969 European Championships the Polish relay team finished fourth.

At the 1970 European Indoor Championships the Polish relay team won silver medals. Balachowski also qualified for the 400 metres final, but did not finish the race. At the 1971 European Indoor Championships he again qualified, but did not start the final race. This time, the Polish team won relay gold. Balachowski ran together with Jan Werner, Andrzej Badeński and Waldemar Korycki. That summer, the same Polish team won silver medals in 4 × 400 metres relay at the 1971 European Championships. The same team then took another relay triumph at the 1972 European Indoor Championships. In the summer Balachowski participated in the 4 × 400 metres relay at the 1972 Olympics, and finished fifth.

He became Polish indoor 400 metres champion in 1973. His personal best time was 45.8 seconds, achieved in 1970.

== International competitions ==
| Year | Competition | Venue | Position | Event | Notes |
Representing Poland
| 1966 | European Junior Games | Odessa, Soviet Union | 3rd | 400 m | 47.8 |
| 1966 | European Junior Games | Odessa, Soviet Union | 3rd | 4 × 400 m relay | 3:14.7 |
| 1967 | European Indoor Games | Prague, Czechoslovakia | 2nd | 4 × 300 m relay | 2:20.2 |
| 1968 | European Indoor Games | Madrid, Spain | 3rd | 400 m | 47.3 |
| 1968 | European Indoor Games | Madrid, Spain | 1st | 4 × 364 m relay | 2:48.9 |
| 1968 | Olympic Games | Mexico City, Mexico | 21st (qf) | 400 m | 46.33 |
| 1968 | Olympic Games | Mexico City, Mexico | 4th | 4 × 400 m relay | 3:00.5 |
| 1969 | European Indoor Games | Belgrade, Yugoslavia | 1st | 400 m | 47.3 |
| 1969 | European Indoor Games | Belgrade, Yugoslavia | 1st | 4 × 390 m relay | 3:01.9 |
| 1969 | European Championships | Athens, Greece | 4th | 4 × 400 m relay | 3:03.16 |
| 1970 | European Indoor Championships | Vienna, Austria | 6th (h) | 400 m | 47.3^{1} |
| 1970 | European Indoor Championships | Vienna, Austria | 2nd | 4 × 400 m relay | 3:07.5 |
| 1970 | European Cup Final | Stockholm, Sweden | 1st | 4 × 400 m relay | 3:05.1 |
| 1971 | European Indoor Championships | Sofia, Bulgaria | 3rd (sf) | 400 m | 48.6^{2} |
| 1971 | European Indoor Championships | Sofia, Bulgaria | 1st | 4 × 400 m relay | 3:11.1 |
| 1971 | European Championships | Helsinki, Finland | 2nd | 4 × 400 m relay | 3:03.64 |
| 1972 | European Indoor Championships | Grenoble, France | 1st | 4 × 360 m relay | 3:11.1 |
| 1972 | Olympic Games | Munich, West Germany | 5th | 4 × 400 m relay | 3:01.05 |
| 1973 | European Indoor Championships | Rotterdam, Netherlands | 9th (h) | 400 m | 48.31 |

^{1}Did not finish in the final
^{2}Did not start in the final

== Personal bests ==
Outdoor

- 100 metres – 10.3h (Kalisz 1969)
- 200 metres – 20.8h (Zakopane 1968)
- 400 metres – 45.8h (Sofia 1970)
- 400 metres – 46.23

Indoor

- 400 metres – 47.3h (1970)
