= Tadeusz Jaworski =

Polish sprinter (born 1945)

Medal record

Men's athletics

European Indoor Championships
Silver medal – second place	1967 Prague	4 x 300 m relay

Tadeusz Jaworski (born 26 September 1945) is a retired Polish sprinter who specialized in the 100 and 200 metres.

He was born in Poznań and represented the club Energetyk Poznań. At the inaugural 1964 European Junior Championships he won the silver medal in the 200 metres, as well as a gold medal in the 4 x 100 metres relay and a silver medal in the medley relay where he ran the opening leg. At the 1967 European Indoor Games he won a silver medal in the 4 x 300 metres relay, which he ran together with Edward Romanowski, Jan Balachowski and Edmund Borowski. He also competed in the 50 metres without reaching the final.

== International competitions ==
Year	Competition	Venue	Position	Event	Notes
Representing Poland
1964	European Junior Games	Warsaw, Poland	2nd	200 m	21.9
1964	European Junior Games	Warsaw, Poland	1st	4 × 100 m relay	41.6
1964	European Junior Games	Warsaw, Poland	2nd	Sprint medley relay	1:55.9
1966	European Championships	Budapest, Hungary	29th (h)	100 m	10.9
1967	European Indoor Games	Prague, Czechoslovakia	4th (h)	50 m	5.7
1967	European Indoor Games	Prague, Czechoslovakia	2nd	4 × 300 m relay	2:20.2
1967	European Cup Final	Kiev, Soviet Union	5th	4 × 100 m relay	40.4

== Personal bests ==
Outdoor

- 100 metres – 10.3h (Poznań 1967)
- 200 metres – 21.4h (Bydgoszcz 1966)
