= Anatoliy Moroz =

Soviet high jumper (born 1948)

Anatoliy Moroz (Ukrainian: Анатолій Михайлович Мороз, romanized: Anatolii Mykhailovych Moroz; born 6 February 1948 in Berdychiv, Ukrainian SSR) is a former Soviet track and field athlete who competed in the high jump. He was the silver medallist at the 1966 European Junior Games before going on to win the gold medal at the 1967 European Indoor Games.

He set a career best of 2.17 m (7 ft 1 1/4 in) in Kyiv in June 1969.

== International competitions ==
Year	Competition	Venue	Position	Event	Notes
1966	European Junior Games	Odesa, Ukraine	2nd	High jump	2.03 m
1967	European Indoor Games	Prague, Czechoslovakia	1st	High jump	2.14 m

== See also ==
- List of European Athletics Indoor Championships medalists (men)
