= 1973 European Athletics Indoor Championships – Men's 400 metres =

The men's 400 metres event at the 1973 European Athletics Indoor Championships was held on 10 and 11 March in Rotterdam.

== Medalists ==
Gold	Silver	Bronze
Luciano Sušanj; Yugoslavia	Benno Stops; East Germany	Dariusz Podobas; Poland

== Results ==
=== Heats ===
Held on 10 March.

First 2 from each heat (Q) qualified directly for the semifinals.

Rank	Heat	Name	Nationality	Time	Notes
1	4	Luciano Sušanj	Yugoslavia	46.83	Q
2	4	Dariusz Podobas	Poland	47.55	Q
3	4	Michael Fredriksson	Sweden	47.70	
4	1	Falko Geiger	West Germany	47.88	Q
5	1	Benno Stops	East Germany	48.06	Q
6	2	Hermann Köhler	West Germany	48.19	Q
7	3	Gerd Pollakowski	East Germany	48.20	Q
8	3	Ulrich Reich	West Germany	48.28	Q
9	1	Jan Balachowski	Poland	48.31	
10	3	Patrick Salvador	France	48.33	
11	2	Manuel Soriano	Spain	48.41	Q
12	2	Jim Aukett	Great Britain	48.47	
13	3	Miroslav Tulis	Czechoslovakia	48.48	
14	4	Bjarni Stefánsson	Iceland	48.73	NR
15	2	Khadzhi Rakhmanov	Soviet Union	48.74	
16	1	Lucien Sainte-Rose	France	48.80	

=== Semifinals ===
Held on 10 March.

First 2 from each heat (Q) qualified directly for the final.

Rank	Heat	Name	Nationality	Time	Notes
1	1	Luciano Sušanj	Yugoslavia	46.73	Q
2	1	Benno Stops	East Germany	47.28	Q
3	2	Dariusz Podobas	Poland	47.55	Q
4	1	Ulrich Reich	West Germany	47.62	
5	2	Gerd Pollakowski	East Germany	47.75	Q
6	2	Falko Geiger	West Germany	47.84	
7	2	Manuel Soriano	Spain	48.01	
	1	Hermann Köhler	West Germany	DNS	

=== Final ===
Held on 11 March.

Rank	Name	Nationality	Time	Notes
1st place, gold medalist(s)	Luciano Sušanj	Yugoslavia	46.38	WB
2nd place, silver medalist(s)	Benno Stops	East Germany	47.31	
3rd place, bronze medalist(s)	Dariusz Podobas	Poland	47.40	
4	Gerd Pollakowski	East Germany	48.28	
