= Helmar Müller =

German sprinter (1939–2023)

Personal information
- Born: 11 August 1939 Sombor, Yugoslavia
- Died: 9 June 2023 (aged 83) Kirchheim unter Teck, Baden-Württemberg, Germany

Sport
- Sport: Track and field
Medal record
Representing West Germany
Summer Olympics
Bronze medal – third place	1968 Mexico City	4 × 400 m relay
European Championships
Bronze medal – third place	1970 Vienna	4 × 400 m relay
Summer Universiade
Gold medal – first place	1967 Tokyo	4 × 400 m relay
Silver medal – second place	1967 Tokyo	400 m

Helmar Müller (11 August 1939 – 9 June 2023) was a West German athlete who competed mainly in the 400 metres.

Müller competed for West Germany in the 1968 Summer Olympics held in Mexico City, Mexico in the 4 × 400 metre relay where he won the bronze medal with his teammates Manfred Kinder, Gerhard Hennige, and Martin Jellinghaus.

Müller died on 9 June 2023, at the age of 83.
