= 1969 European Indoor Games =

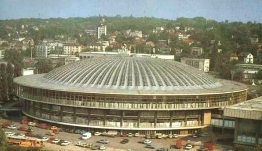
- Dates: 8–9 March 1969
- Host city: Belgrade (Socialist Federal Republic of Yugoslavia) Yugoslavia
- Venue: Belgrade Fair – Hall 1
- Events: 23
- Participation: 220 athletes from 22 nations

The 1969 European Indoor Games were held between 8–9 March 1969 in Belgrade, the capital of Yugoslavia (present-day Serbia). In 1970 the European Indoor Games were replaced by the European Athletics Indoor Championships.

The track used for the championships was 195 metres long.

== Medal summary ==
=== Men ===
Event	Gold		Silver		Bronze	
50 metres	Zenon Nowosz (POL)	5.8	Valeriy Borzov (URS)	5.8	Bob Frith (GBR)	5.8
400 metres	Jan Balachowski (POL)	47.3	Jan Werner (POL)	47.4	Yuriy Zorin (URS)	47.4
800 metres	Dieter Fromm (GDR)	1:46.6 CR	Henryk Szordykowski (POL)	1:47.1	Noel Carroll (IRL)	1:47.6
1500 metres	Edgard Salvé (BEL)	3:45.9	Knut Brustad (NOR)	3:46.2	Walter Wilkinson (GBR)	3:46.4
3000 metres	Ian Stewart (GBR)	7:55.4 CR	Javier Álvarez (ESP)	7:56.2	Werner Girke (FRG)	7:56.8
50 metres hurdles	Alan Pascoe (GBR)	6.6	Werner Trzmiel (FRG)	6.6	Nicolae Pertea (ROM)	6.7
4 × 390 metres relay	Poland; Jan Werner; Jan Radomski; Andrzej Badeński; Jan Balachowski	3:01.9	Soviet Union; Leonid Mikishev; Aleksandr Bratchikov; Valeriy Borzov; Yuriy Zorin	3:01.9	West Germany; Dieter Hübner; Herbert Moser; Peter Bernreuther; Manfred Kinder	3:04.5
Medley relay	Poland; Edward Romanowski; Andrzej Badeński; Henryk Szordykowski; Jan Radomski	4:16.4	Only one finishing team			
3 × 1000 metres relay	West Germany; Anton Adam; Walter Adams; Harald Norpoth	7:08.0	Czechoslovakia; Ján Šišovský; Petr Blaha; Pavel Pěnkava	7:23.1	Yugoslavia; Radovan Piplović; Slavko Koprivica; Adam Ladik	7:42.8
High jump	Valentin Gavrilov (URS)	2.14	Henry Elliott (FRA)	2.14	Șerban Ioan (ROM)	2.14
Pole vault	Wolfgang Nordwig (GDR)	5.20 =CR	Hennadiy Bleznitsov (URS)	5.10	Joachim Bär (GDR)	5.10
Long jump	Klaus Beer (GDR)	7.77	Lynn Davies (GBR)	7.76	Rafael Blanquer (ESP)	7.63
Triple jump	Nikolay Dudkin (URS)	16.73 CR	Zoltán Cziffra (HUN)	16.46	Carol Corbu (ROM)	16.20
Shot put	Heinfried Birlenbach (FRG)	19.51 CR	Hartmut Briesenick (GDR)	19.19	Heinz-Joachim Rothenburg (GDR)	18.69

=== Women ===
Event	Gold		Silver		Bronze	
50 metres	Irena Szewińska (POL)	6.4	Sylviane Telliez (FRA)	6.5	Madeleine Cobb (GBR)	6.5
400 metres	Colette Besson (FRA)	54.0 CR	Christel Frese (FRG)	54.8	Rosemary Stirling (GBR)	54.8
800 metres	Barbara Wieck (GDR)	2:05.3 CR	Magdolna Kulcsár (HUN)	2:07.5	Anna Zimina (URS)	2:08.0
50 metres hurdles	Karin Balzer (GDR)	7.2	Meta Antenen (SUI)	7.3	Christine Perera (GBR)	7.4
4 × 195 metres relay	France; Odette Ducas; Sylviane Telliez; Colette Besson; Christiane Martinetto	1:34.3	Soviet Union; Galina Bukharina; Vera Popkova; Lyudmila Golomazova; Lyudmila Samotyosova	1:34.6	Yugoslavia; Darja Marolt; Verica Ambrozi; Ljiljana Petnjarić; Marijana Lubej	1:36.9
Medley relay	Soviet Union; Vera Popkova; Lyudmila Samotyosova; Raisa Nikonorova; Anna Zimina	4:52.4	Poland; Irena Szewińska; Zdzisława Robaszewska; Elżbieta Skowrońska; Zofia Kołakowska	4:53.2	Yugoslavia; Verica Ambrozi; Ika Maričić; Mirjana Kovačev; Ninoslava Tikvicki	5:05.9
High jump	Rita Schmidt (GDR)	1.82	Yordanka Blagoeva (BUL)	1.82	Antonina Lazareva (URS)	1.79
Long jump	Irena Szewińska (POL)	6.38	Sue Scott (GBR)	6.18	Meta Antenen (SUI)	6.15
Shot put	Marita Lange (GDR)	17.52	Ivanka Khristova (BUL)	16.94	Ingeburg Friedrich (GDR)	16.42

== Medal table ==
Rank	Nation	Gold	Silver	Bronze	Total
1	East Germany (GDR)	7	1	3	11
2	Poland (POL)	6	3	0	9
3	Soviet Union (URS)	3	4	3	10
4	Great Britain (GBR)	2	2	5	9
5	West Germany (FRG)	2	2	2	6
6	France (FRA)	2	2	0	4
7	Belgium (BEL)	1	0	0	1
8	Bulgaria (BUL)	0	2	0	2
8	Hungary (HUN)	0	2	0	2
10	Spain (ESP)	0	1	1	2
10	Switzerland (SUI)	0	1	1	2
12	Czechoslovakia (TCH)	0	1	0	1
12	Norway (NOR)	0	1	0	1
14	Romania (ROU)	0	0	3	3
14	Yugoslavia (YUG)	0	0	3	3
16	Ireland (IRL)	0	0	1	1
Totals (16 entries)		23	22	22	67

== Participating nations ==
- Austria (5)
- Belgium (3)
- Bulgaria (9)
- Czechoslovakia (15)
- Denmark (2)
- East Germany (14)
- Finland (2)
- France (13)
- Great Britain (14)
- Hungary (13)
- Ireland (1)
- Italy (5)
- Norway (2)
- Poland (21)
- Romania (9)
- Soviet Union (21)
- Spain (6)
- Sweden (7)
- Switzerland (5)
- Turkey (2)
- West Germany (22)
- Yugoslavia (29)
