= Fritz Roderfeld =

German sprinter

Personal information
- Nationality: German
- Born: 31 July 1943 (age 82)

Sport
- Sport: Sprinting
- Event: 200 metres
Medal record
Men's athletics
Representing West Germany
European Championships
Silver medal – second place	1966 Budapest	4×400 m

Fritz Roderfeld (born 31 July 1943) is a German sprinter. He competed in the men's 200 metres at the 1964 Summer Olympics.
