= Brzeziny, Gmina Skomlin =

Brzeziny
- Village
- Location within Poland
- Coordinates: 51°12′37″N 18°24′52″E
- Country: Poland
- Voivodeship: Łódź
- County: Wieluń
- Gmina: Skomlin

Brzeziny [bʐɛˈʑinɨ] is a village in the administrative district of Gmina Skomlin, within Wieluń County, Łódź Voivodeship, in central Poland.
