= Thord Carlsson =

Swedish radio presenter and actor

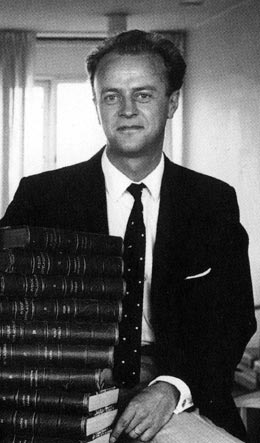
Thord Carlsson in 1968.

Ernst Thord Emanuel Carlsson, (10 July 1931 in Piteå – 7 November 2005) was a Swedish radio presenter and actor. Carlsson graduated in Luleå and moved to Uppsala to study at the universities humaniora. Carlsson took at philosophy exam in literature history and became a school teacher in Fagersta. During his studies he became a member of Juvenalorden. In 1962, he substituted at Sveriges Radio. He became a producer at Sveriges bilradio and he got the work to start the radio show Sommar i P1. He became an employee at the radio in 1964.

Carlssons first show was Vad betyder våra ortnamn?, Thord Carlsson acted in Äppelkriget 1971, Picassos äventyr 1978 and Sopor 1981. Thord Carlsson medverkade i AB Svenska Ords Äppelkriget 1971, Picassos äventyr 1978 och Sopor 1981.
