= Waldemar Korycki =

Polish sprinter (born 1946)

Medal record

Men's athletics

Representing Poland

European Championships
Silver medal – second place	1971 Helsinki	4 × 400 m relay

European Indoor Championships
Gold medal – first place	1968 Madrid	4 × 364 m relay
Gold medal – first place	1971 Sofia	4 × 400 m relay
Gold medal – first place	1972 Grenoble	4 × 400 m relay
Silver medal – second place	1968 Madrid	Medley relay

Waldemar Korycki (born 11 August 1946 in Wierzchowo) is a Polish retired sprinter who specialized in the 400 metres.

He was a successful relay runner. At the 1968 European Indoor Games he won a gold medal in the short relay and a silver medal in the medley relay. At the 1971 European Indoor Championships he won a gold medal in the 4 × 400 metres relay together with Jan Werner, Andrzej Badeński and Jan Balachowski. With the same team members he won a silver medal in the relay at the 1971 European Championships. The same team won the relay at the 1972 European Indoor Championships.

== International competitions ==
Year	Competition	Venue	Position	Event	Notes
Representing Poland
1968	European Indoor Games	Madrid, Spain	1st	4 × 364 m relay	2:48.9
1968	European Indoor Games	Madrid, Spain	2nd	Medley relay	3:54.6
1971	European Indoor Championships	Sofia, Bulgaria	1st	4 × 400 m relay	3:11.1
1971	European Championships	Helsinki, Finland	14th (h)	400 m	47.10^{1}
1971	European Championships	Helsinki, Finland	2nd	4 × 400 m relay	3:03.64
1972	European Indoor Championships	Grenoble, France	1st	4 × 360 m relay	3:11.1

^{1}Did not start in the semifinal

== Personal bests ==
Outdoor

- 200 metres – 21.2h (Bydgoszcz 1968)
- 400 metres – 46.2h (Warsaw 1971)
