= Etelka Kispál =

Hungarian sprinter (born 1941)

Personal information
- Nationality: Hungarian
- Born: 25 January 1941 (age 84)

Sport
- Sport: Sprinting
- Event: 4 × 100 metres relay

Etelka Kispál (born 25 January 1941) is a Hungarian sprinter. She competed in the women's 4 × 100 metres relay at the 1968 Summer Olympics.
