= Hryhoriy Sverbetov =

Ukrainian sprinter

Personal information
- Nationality: Ukrainian
- Born: 3 April 1939 (age 87) Odesa, Ukrainian SSR, Soviet Union

Sport
- Sport: Sprinting
- Event: 400 metres

Hryhoriy Sverbetov (Ukrainian: Григорій Свербетов; born 3 April 1939) is a Ukrainian sprinter. He competed in the men's 400 metres at the 1964 Summer Olympics representing the Soviet Union.
