= Manuel Gayoso =

Spanish middle-distance runner

Personal information
- Nationality: Spanish
- Born: 1 January 1944 (age 82)

Sport
- Sport: Middle-distance running
- Event: 800 metres

Manuel Gayoso (born 1 January 1944) is a Spanish middle-distance runner. He competed in the men's 800 metres at the 1972 Summer Olympics.
