= Ostrzyca, Lublin Voivodeship =

Ostrzyca
- Village
- Location within Poland
- Coordinates: 50°55′N 23°7′E
- Country: Poland
- Voivodeship: Lublin
- County: Krasnystaw
- Gmina: Izbica

Ostrzyca [ɔsˈtʂɨt͡sa] is a village in the administrative district of Gmina Izbica. It is within Krasnystaw County, Lublin Voivodeship, in eastern Poland.
