= Magdolna Kulcsár =

Hungarian middle-distance runner

Personal information
- Nationality: Hungarian
- Born: 18 February 1948 (age 78)

Sport
- Sport: Middle-distance running
- Event: 800 metres

Magdolna Kulcsár (born 18 February 1948) is a Hungarian middle-distance runner. She competed in the women's 800 metres at the 1972 Summer Olympics.
