= 1968 European Indoor Games =

- Dates: 9–10 March 1968
- Host city: Madrid; Spain
- Venue: Palacio de Deportes
- Events: 23
- Participation: 206 athletes from 20 nations

The 1968 European Indoor Games were held between 9–10 March 1968 at Palacio de Deportes, Madrid, the capital of Spain.

The track used for the championships was 182 metres long.

== Medal summary ==
=== Men ===
Event	Gold		Silver		Bronze	
50 metres	Jobst Hirscht (FRG)	5.72	Bob Frith (GBR)	5.78	Günter Gollos (GDR)	5.78
400 metres	Andrzej Badeński (POL)	47.09u CR	Aleksandr Bratchikov (URS)	47.3	Jan Balachowski (POL)	47.3
800 metres	Noel Carroll (IRL)	1:56.66u	Alberto Estebán (ESP)	1:57.7	Sergey Kryuchok (URS)	1:58.1
1500 metres	John Whetton (GBR)	3:50.99u	José María Morera (ESP)	3:51.7	Igor Potapchenko (URS)	3:51.9
3000 metres	Viktor Kudinskiy (URS)	8:10.27u	Bernd Diessner (GDR)	8:11.8	Wolfgang Zur (FRG)	8:11.8
50 metres hurdles	Eddy Ottoz (ITA)	6.57	Günther Nickel (FRG)	6.68	Milan Kotík (TCH)	6.73
4 × 364 metres relay	Poland; Waldemar Korycki; Jan Balachowski; Jan Werner; Andrzej Badeński	2:48.9	West Germany; Horst Daverkausen; Peter Bernreuther; Ingo Roper; Martin Jellinghaus	2:49.7	Soviet Union; Boris Savchuk; Vasyl Anisimov; Sergey Abalichin; Aleksandr Bratchikov	2:51.1
Medley relay(1820 m)	Soviet Union; Aleksandr Lebedev; Boris Savchuk; Igor Potapchenko; Sergey Kryuchok	3:52.2	Poland; Marian Dudziak; Waldemar Korycki; Andrzej Badeński; Edmund Borowski	3:54.6	Spain; José Luis Sánchez Paraíso; Ramon Magarinos; Alfonso Gabernet; José María Reina	4:02.8
3 × 1000 metres relay	Soviet Union; Mikhail Zhelobovskiy; Oleg Rayko; Anatoliy Verlan	7:13.6	Spain; Alberto Estebán; Enrique Bondia; Virgilio González	7:23.6	Czechoslovakia; Pavel Hruška; Ján Kasal; Miroslav Jůza	7:40.2
High jump	Valeriy Skvortsov (URS)	2.17 =CR	Valentin Gavrilov (URS)	2.17 =CR	Kenneth Lundmark (SWE)	2.14
Pole vault	Wolfgang Nordwig (GDR)	5.20 CR	Hennadiy Bleznitsov (URS)	5.10	Jörge Milack (GDR)	5.00
Long jump	Igor Ter-Ovanesyan (URS)	8.16	Tõnu Lepik (URS)	7.87	Bernhard Stierle (FRG)	7.59
Triple jump	Nikolay Dudkin (URS)	16.71 CR	Viktor Sanyeyev (URS)	16.69	Luis Felipe Areta (ESP)	16.47
Shot put	Heinfried Birlenbach (FRG)	18.65 CR	Władysław Komar (POL)	18.40	Nikolay Karasyov (URS)	18.35

=== Women ===
Event	Gold		Silver		Bronze	
50 metres	Sylviane Telliez (FRA)	6.29	Erika Rost (FRG)	6.43	Hannelore Trabert (FRG)	6.46
400 metres	Natalya Pechonkina (URS)	55.29u CR	Gisela Köpke (FRG)	56.2	Tatyana Arnautova (URS)	56.3
800 metres	Karin Burneleit (GDR)	2:07.65u CR	Alla Kolesnikova (URS)	2:08.3	Valentina Lukyanova (URS)	2:09.4
50 metres hurdles	Karin Balzer (GDR)	7.08	Bärbel Weidlich (GDR)	7.12	Liudmila Ievleva (URS)	7.14
4 × 182 metres relay	West Germany; Renate Meyer; Hannelore Trabert; Christa Elsler; Erika Rost	1:28.8	Only one finishing team			
Medley relay(1820 m)	Soviet Union; Liliya Tkachenko; Vera Popkova; Nadezhda Syeropegina; Anna Zimina	4:28.4	Czechoslovakia; Eva Putnová; Vlasta Seifertová; Libuše Macounová; Emilie Ovadková	4:39.0	Only two teams started	
High jump	Rita Schmidt (GDR)	1.84 CR	Virginia Bonci (ROM)	1.76	Antonina Okorokova (URS)	1.76
Long jump	Berit Berthelsen (NOR)	6.43	Bärbel Löhnert (GDR)	6.23	Viorica Viscopoleanu (ROM)	6.23
Shot put	Nadezhda Chizhova (URS)	18.18 CR	Margitta Gummel (GDR)	17.62	Marita Lange (GDR)	17.19

== Medal table ==
Rank	Nation	Gold	Silver	Bronze	Total
1	Soviet Union (URS)	9	6	8	23
2	East Germany (GDR)	4	4	3	11
3	West Germany (FRG)	3	4	3	10
4	Poland (POL)	2	2	1	5
5	France (FRA)	1	0	0	1
5	Ireland (IRL)	1	0	0	1
5	Italy (ITA)	1	0	0	1
5	Norway (NOR)	1	0	0	1
9	Spain (ESP)	0	3	2	5
10	Czechoslovakia (TCH)	0	1	2	3
11	Romania (ROU)	0	1	1	2
12	Great Britain (GBR)	0	1	0	1
13	Sweden (SWE)	0	0	1	1
Totals (13 entries)		22	22	21	65

== Participating nations ==
- Bulgaria (5)
- Czechoslovakia (17)
- Denmark (2)
- East Germany (15)
- France (12)
- Great Britain (7)
- Greece (2)
- Ireland (1)
- Italy (8)
- Norway (5)
- Poland (12)
- Portugal (3)
- Romania (6)
- Soviet Union (41)
- Spain (16)
- Sweden (7)
- Switzerland (6)
- Turkey (2)
- West Germany (28)
- Yugoslavia (11)
