= 1967 European Indoor Games =

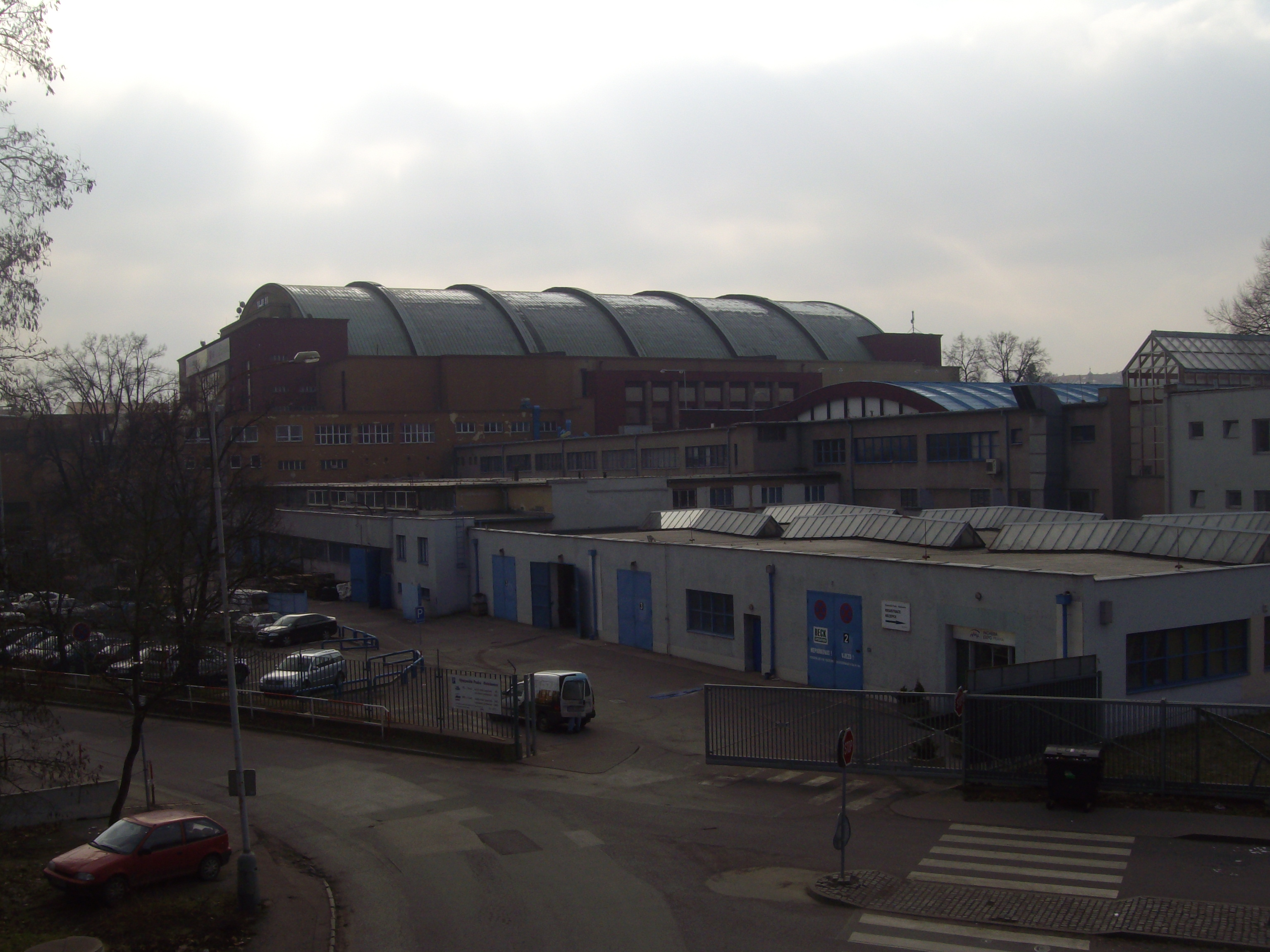
- Dates: 11–12 March 1967
- Host city: Prague; Czechoslovakia
- Venue: Sportovní hala
- Events: 23
- Participation: 244 athletes from 23 nations

The 1967 European Indoor Games were held at Sportovní hala, Prague, Czechoslovakia (present-day Czech Republic) from 11 March to 12 March 1967.

The track used for the championships was 150 metres long.

== Medal summary ==
=== Men ===
Event	Gold		Silver		Bronze	
50 metres	Pasquale Giannattasio (ITA)	5.7	Aleksandr Lebedev (URS)	5.8	Viktor Kasatkin (URS)	5.89
400 metres	Manfred Kinder (FRG)	48.4	Hartmut Koch (GDR)	48.6	Nikolay Shkarnikov (URS)	50.4
800 metres	Noel Carroll (IRL)	1:49.6	Tomáš Jungwirth (TCH)	1:49.8	Jan Kasal (TCH)	1:50.0
1500 metres	John Whetton (GBR)	3:48.7	Josef Odložil (TCH)	3:49.6	Stanislav Hoffman (TCH)	3:50.5
3000 metres	Werner Girke (FRG)	7:58.6	Rashid Sharafetdinov (URS)	7:59.0	Lajos Mecser (HUN)	8:00.6
50 metres hurdles	Eddy Ottoz (ITA)	6.4	Valentin Chistyakov (URS)	6.6	Anatoly Mikhailov (URS)	6.7
4 × 300 metres relay	Soviet Union; Nikolay Ivanov; Vasyl Anisimov; Aleksandr Bratchikov; Borys Savchuk	2:18.0	Poland; Edward Romanowski; Jan Balachowski; Edmund Borowski; Tadeusz Jaworski	2:20.2	Czechoslovakia; Jaromír Haisl; Josef Hegyes; František Ortman; Josef Trousil	2:20.5
Medley relay(1500 m)	West Germany; Gert Metz; Horst Haßlinger; Rolf Krüsmann; Manfred Hanika	3:06.6	Soviet Union; Borys Savchuk; Vasyl Anisimov; Aleksandr Bratchikov; Valeriy Frolov	3:06.9	Czechoslovakia; Jiří Kynos; Ladislav Kříž; Pavel Hruška; Pavel Pěnkava	3:08.8
3 × 1000 metres relay	West Germany; Klaus Prenner; Wolf-Jochen Schulte-Hillen; Franz-Josef Kemper	7:19.6	Czechoslovakia; Pavel Hruška; Pavel Pěnkava; Petr Blaha	7:20.0	Soviet Union; Ramir Mitrofanov; Stanislav Simbirtsev; Mikhail Zhelobovskiy	7:20.6
High jump	Anatoliy Moroz (URS)	2.14	Henry Elliot (FRA)	2.14	Rudolf Baudiš (TCH)	2.11
Pole vault	Igor Feld (URS)	5.00	Hennadiy Bleznitsov (URS)	4.90	Wolfgang Nordwig (GDR)	4.90
Long jump	Lynn Davies (GBR)	7.85	Leonid Barkovskyy (URS)	7.85	Andrzej Stalmach (POL)	7.74
Triple jump	Petr Nemšovský (TCH)	16.57	Henrik Kalocsai (HUN)	16.45	Aleksandr Zolotaryov (URS)	16.40
Shot put	Nikolay Karasyov (URS)	19.26	Eduard Gushchin (URS)	18.95	Władysław Komar (POL)	18.85

=== Women ===
Event	Gold		Silver		Bronze	
50 metres	Margit Nemesházi (HUN)	6.3	Karin Wallgren (SWE)	6.4u	Galina Bukharina (URS)	6.45
400 metres	Karin Wallgren (SWE)	55.7	Lia Louer (NED)	56.7	Ljiljana Petnjaric (YUG)	57.3
800 metres	Karin Kessler (FRG)	2:08.2	Maryvonne Dupureur (FRA)	2:09.6	Valentina Lukyanova (URS)	2:10.5
50 metres hurdles	Karin Balzer (GDR)	6.9	Vlasta Seifertová (TCH)	7.0	Inge Schell (FRG)	7.1
4 × 150 metres relay	Soviet Union; Valentyna Bolshova; Galina Bukharina; Tatyana Talysheva; Vera Popkova	1:12.4	Czechoslovakia; Eva Putnová; Vlasta Seifertová; Eva Kucmanová; Eva Lehocká	1:14.0	East Germany; Regina Höfer; Petra Zöllner; Renate Meißner; Brigitte Geyer	1:14.1
Medley relay(1500 m)	Soviet Union; Valentyna Bolshova; Vera Popkova; Tatyana Arnautova; Nadeshda Syeropegina	3:35.6	Yugoslavia; Marijana Lubej; Ika Maričić; Ljiljana Petnjarić; Gizela Farkaš	3:37.5	Only two teams finished	
High jump	Taisiya Chenchik (URS)	1.76	Linda Knowles (GBR)	1.73	Jaroslava Králová (TCH)	1.70
Long jump	Berit Berthelsen (NOR)	6.51	Heide Rosendahl (FRG)	6.41	Viorica Viscopoleanu (ROM)	6.40
Shot put	Nadezhda Chizhova (URS)	17.44	Ivanka Khristova (BUL)	16.55	Maria Chorbova (BUL)	16.23

== Medal table ==
Rank	Nation	Gold	Silver	Bronze	Total
1	Soviet Union (URS)	8	7	7	22
2	West Germany (FRG)	5	1	1	7
3	Great Britain (GBR)	2	1	0	3
4	Italy (ITA)	2	0	0	2
5	Czechoslovakia (TCH)	1	5	6	12
6	East Germany (GDR)	1	1	2	4
7	Hungary (HUN)	1	1	1	3
8	Sweden (SWE)	1	1	0	2
9	Ireland (IRL)	1	0	0	1
9	Norway (NOR)	1	0	0	1
11	France (FRA)	0	2	0	2
12	Poland (POL)	0	1	2	3
13	Bulgaria (BUL)	0	1	1	2
13	Yugoslavia (YUG)	0	1	1	2
15	Netherlands (NED)	0	1	0	1
16	Romania (ROM)	0	0	1	1
Totals (16 entries)		23	23	22	68

== Participating nations ==
- Austria (1)
- Belgium (3)
- Bulgaria (7)
- Czechoslovakia (46)
- Denmark (2)
- East Germany (19)
- Finland (3)
- France (5)
- Great Britain (7)
- Hungary (13)
- Ireland (1)
- Italy (12)
- Netherlands (4)
- Norway (2)
- Poland (15)
- Romania (3)
- Soviet Union (38)
- Spain (10)
- Sweden (4)
- Switzerland (4)
- Turkey (3)
- West Germany (24)
- Yugoslavia (18)

== See also ==
- European Athletics Indoor Championships
- List of European records in athletics
