= Stanisław Grędziński =

Polish sprinter (1945–2022)

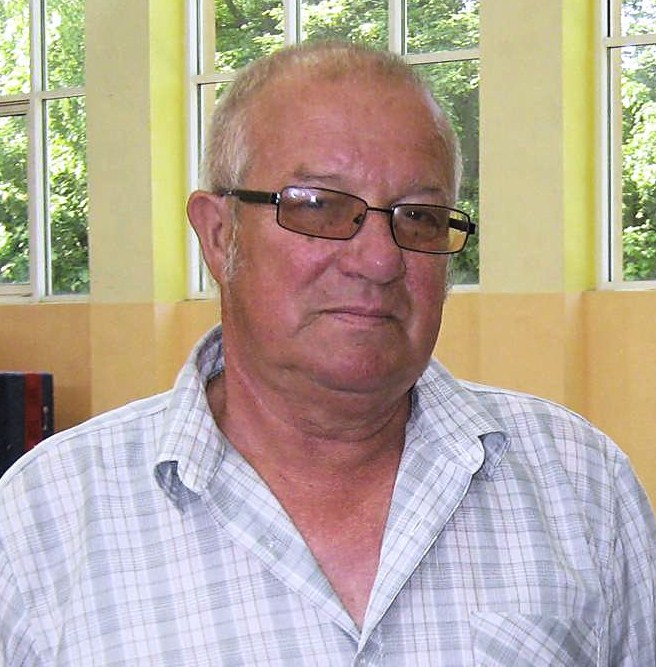

Personal information
- Born: 19 October 1945 Ostrzyca, Poland
- Died: 19 January 2022 (aged 76)
- Height: 1.78 m (5 ft 10 in)
- Weight: 73 kg (161 lb)
Medal record
Men's athletics
Representing Poland
European Championships
Gold medal – first place	1966 Budapest	400 m
Gold medal – first place	1966 Budapest	4×400 m
Bronze medal – third place	1969 Athens	400 m
European Indoor Championships
Silver medal – second place	1970 Vienna	4×400 m

Stanisław Grędziński (19 October 1945 – 19 January 2022) was a Polish sprinter who specialized in the 400 metres.

== Career ==
Grędziński was born in Ostrzyca, Poland, and represented the club Górnik Wałbrzych. At the 1964 European Junior Championships he won silver medals in both 400 metres and 400 metres hurdles, as well as a silver medal in the medley relay where he ran the last leg. He became Polish 400 metres champion in 1966 and 1969.

He was successful at the European Championships with a gold medal in 1966 and a silver in 1969, both individually. In the relay he won a gold medal in 1966 and finished fourth in 1969. He also finished fourth in the 4 × 400 metre relay at the 1968 Summer Olympics. At the 1970 European Indoor Championships the Polish relay team won silver medals. His personal best time was 45.83 seconds, achieved in 1969.

Grędziński died on 19 January 2022, at the age of 77.

== International competitions ==
Year	Competition	Venue	Position	Event	Notes
Representing Poland
1964	European Junior Games	Warsaw, Poland	2nd	400 m	48.9
1964	European Junior Games	Warsaw, Poland	2nd	400 m hurdles	52.3
1964	European Junior Games	Warsaw, Poland	2nd	Sprint medley relay	1:55.9
1965	European Cup Final	Stuttgart, West Germany	2nd	4 × 400 m relay	3:08.7
1966	European Championships	Budapest, Hungary	1st	400 m	46.0
1966	European Championships	Budapest, Hungary	1st	4 × 400 m relay	3:04.5
1967	European Cup Final	Kiev, Soviet Union	1st	4 × 400 m relay	3:04.4
1968	Olympic Games	Mexico City, Mexico	4th	4 × 400 m relay	3:00.5
1969	European Championships	Athens, Greece	3rd	400 m	45.83
1969	European Championships	Athens, Greece	4th	4 × 400 m relay	3:03.16
1970	European Indoor Championships	Vienna, Austria	2nd	4 × 400 m relay	3:07.5

^{1}Did not finish in the final

== Personal bests ==
- 100 metres – 10.5h (Poznań 1965)
- 200 metres – 21.0h (Zakopane 1968)
- 400 metres – 45.83 (Athens 1969)
