= 1970 European Athletics Indoor Championships =

- Dates: 14–15 March 1970
- Host city: Vienna; Austria
- Venue: Wiener Stadthalle
- Events: 23
- Participation: 281 athletes from 24 nations
- Records set: 1 =WB, 6 WB

The 1970 European Athletics Indoor Championships were held in 1970 at Wiener Stadthalle, Vienna, the capital of Austria, between 14–15 March 1970. It replaced the European Indoor Games, an indoor athletics competition which had been held since 1966.

== Medals ==
=== Men ===
Event	Gold		Silver		Bronze	
60 metres	Valeriy Borzov (URS)	6.6 =WB	Zenon Nowosz (POL)	6.7	Jarkko Tapola (FIN)	6.7
400 metres	Aleksandr Bratchikov (URS)	46.8	Andrzej Badeński (POL)	46.9	Yuriy Zorin (URS)	48.4
800 metres	Yevgeniy Arzhanov (URS)	1:51.0	Juan Borroz (ESP)	1:51.9	Jože Međimurec (YUG)	1:51.9
1500 metres	Henryk Szordykowski (POL)	3:48.8	Frank Murphy (IRL)	3:49.0	Volodymyr Panteley (URS)	3:49.8
3000 metres	Ricky Wilde (GBR)	7:46.85 WB	Harald Norpoth (FRG)	7:49.50	Javier Álvarez (ESP)	7:52.45
60 metres hurdles	Günther Nickel (FRG)	7.8a	Frank Siebeck (GDR)	7.8a	Guy Drut (FRA)	7.8a
4 × 400 metres relay	Soviet Union; Yevgeniy Borisenko; Yuriy Zorin; Boris Savchuk; Aleksandr Bratchikov	3:05.9	Poland; Jan Werner; Stanisław Grędziński; Jan Balachowski; Andrzej Badeński	3:07.5	West Germany; Dieter Hübner; Karl-Hermann Tofaute; Ulrich Strohhacker; Helmar Müller	3:10.7
Medley relay (2800 m)	Soviet Union; Aleksander Konnikov; Sergey Kryuchek; Vladimir Kolesnikov; Ivan Ivanov	6:18.0	Poland; Edmund Borowski; Stanisław Waśkiewicz; Kazimierz Wardak; Eryk Żelazny	6:18.8	West Germany; Horst Hasslinger; Lothar Hirsch; Manfred Henne; Ingo Sensburg	6:19.6
High jump	Valentin Gavrilov (URS)	2.20	Gerd Dührkop (GDR)	2.17	Șerban Ioan (ROM)	2.17
Pole vault	François Tracanelli (FRA)	5.30	Kjell Isaksson (SWE)	5.25	Wolfgang Nordwig (GDR)	5.20
Long jump	Tõnu Lepik (URS)	8.05	Klaus Beer (GDR)	7.99	Rafael Blanquer (ESP)	7.92
Triple jump	Viktor Sanyeyev (URS)	16.95 WB	Jörg Drehmel (GDR)	16.74	Șerban Ciochină (ROM)	16.47
Shot put	Hartmut Briesenick (GDR)	20.22	Heinz-Joachim Rothenburg (GDR)	19.70	Pierre Colnard (FRA)	18.96

=== Women ===
Event	Gold		Silver		Bronze	
60 metres	Renate Meissner (GDR)	7.4	Sylviane Telliez (FRA)	7.5	Wilma van den Berg (NED)	7.5
400 metres	Marilyn Neufville (GBR)	53.01 WB	Christel Frese (FRG)	53.13	Colette Besson (FRA)	53.63
800 metres	Maria Sykora (AUT)	2:07.0	Lyudmila Bragina (URS)	2:07.5	Zofia Kołakowska (POL)	2:07.6
60 metres hurdles	Karin Balzer (GDR)	8.2 WB	Liya Khitrina (URS)	8.2 WB	Teresa Sukniewicz (POL)	8.5
4 × 200 metres relay	Soviet Union; Nadezhda Besfamilnaya; Vera Popkova; Galina Bukharina; Lyudmila Samotyosova	1:35.7	West Germany; Elfgard Schittenhelm; Annelie Wilden; Marianne Bolling; Annegret Kroniger	1:37.6	Austria; Maria Sykora; Brigitte Ortner; Christa Kepplinger; Hanni Burger	1:40.8
Medley relay (2000 m)	France; Sylviane Telliez; Mireille Testanière; Colette Besson; Nicole Duclos	4:58.4	West Germany; Elfgard Schittenhelm; Heidi Gerhard; Christa Merten; Jutta Haase	5:01.1	Soviet Union; Lyudmila Golomazova; Olga Klein; Nadezhda Kolesnikova; Svetlana Moshchenok	5:02.2
High jump	Ilona Gusenbauer (AUT)	1.88 WB	Cornelia Popescu (ROM)	1.82	Rita Schmidt (GDR)	1.82
Long jump	Viorica Viscopoleanu (ROM)	6.56	Heide Rosendahl (FRG)	6.55	Mirosława Sarna (POL)	6.54
Shot put	Nadezhda Chizhova (URS)	18.80 WB	Hannelore Friedel (GDR)	18.39	Marita Lange (GDR)	18.09

=== Table ===
Rank	Nation	Gold	Silver	Bronze	Total
1	Soviet Union (URS)	10	2	3	15
2	East Germany (GDR)	3	6	3	12
3	France (FRA)	2	1	3	6
4	Austria (AUT)	2	0	1	3
5	Great Britain (GBR)	2	0	0	2
6	West Germany (FRG)	1	5	2	8
7	Poland (POL)	1	4	3	8
8	Romania (ROU)	1	1	2	4
9	Spain (ESP)	0	1	2	3
10	Ireland (IRL)	0	1	0	1
10	Sweden (SWE)	0	1	0	1
12	Finland (FIN)	0	0	1	1
12	Netherlands (NED)	0	0	1	1
12	Yugoslavia (YUG)	0	0	1	1
Totals (14 entries)		22	22	22	66

== Participating nations ==
- Austria (21)
- Belgium (6)
- Bulgaria (7)
- Czechoslovakia (14)
- Denmark (4)
- East Germany (15)
- Finland (4)
- France (21)
- Great Britain (12)
- Greece (1)
- Hungary (8)
- Ireland (3)
- Italy (9)
- Netherlands (3)
- Norway (7)
- Poland (26)
- Romania (10)
- Soviet Union (45)
- Spain (8)
- Sweden (7)
- Switzerland (5)
- Turkey (4)
- West Germany (33)
- Yugoslavia (8)
