= Manfred Kinder =

German sprinter (born 1938)

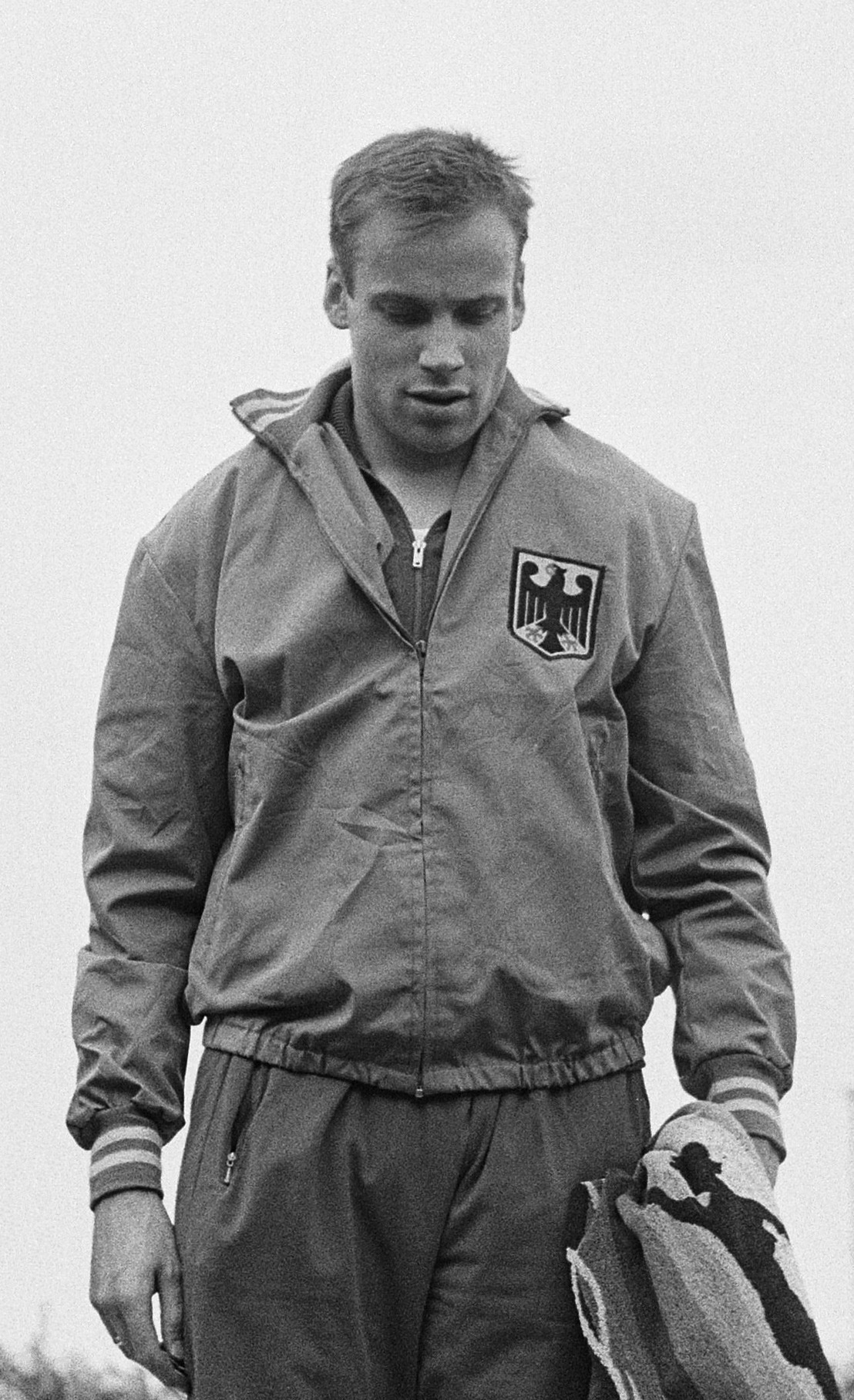
- Kinder in 1963

Personal information
- Born: 20 April 1938 (age 88) Königsberg, Germany
- Height: 1.84 m (6 ft 0 in)
- Weight: 73 kg (161 lb)

Sport
- Sport: Sprint running
- Club: OSV Hörde, Dortmund; Wuppertaler SV, Wuppertal
Medal record
Representing Germany
Olympic Games
Silver medal – second place	1960 Rome	4 × 400 metre relay
Representing West Germany
Olympic Games
Bronze medal – third place	1968 Mexico City	4 × 400 metre relay
European Championships
Gold medal – first place	1962 Belgrade	4 × 400 metres relay
Silver medal – second place	1962 Belgrade	400 metres
Silver medal – second place	1966 Budapest	4 × 400 metres relay
Bronze medal – third place	1966 Budapest	400 metres
European Indoor Championships
Gold medal – first place	1967 Prague	400 metres
Silver medal – second place	1966 Dortmund	400 metres
Bronze medal – third place	1969 Belgrade	4 × 390 metres relay

Manfred Kinder (born 20 April 1938) is a West German former sprinter. He won a silver and a bronze medal in the 4 × 400 m relay at the 1960 and 1968 Summer Olympics, respectively, and finished in fifth place in 1964. Individually, he competed in the 400 m and 800 m, with the best result of fifth place in the 400 m in 1960.

At the European Championships, he won seven medals in total between 1962 and 1969, in the 400 m and 4 × 400 m relay events.
