= Colin Campbell (sportsman, born 1946) =

British sportsman (1946–2024)

Personal information
- Nationality: British (English)
- Born: 20 June 1946 Jersey, Channel Islands, UK
- Died: 23 December 2024 (aged 78)
- Height: 185 cm (6 ft 1 in)
- Weight: 76 kg (168 lb)

Sport
- Sport: Athletics
- Event: 400m / middle distance
- Club: Polytechnic Harriers

Colin William Ashburner Campbell (20 June 1946 – 23 December 2024) was a British sportsman, who competed in track and field athletics and in the bobsled. He competed for Great Britain in the 1968 and 1972 Summer Olympics, before moving to bobsled and competing at the 1976 Winter Olympics, becoming one of only a handful of British athletes to compete at both the Summer and Winter games.

== Biography ==
Born on the island of Jersey, Campbell was a sporty child who progressed through youth competitions to compete internationally in athletics for Britain.

As a middle-distance runner Campbell competed in the 400 metres and 800 metres. Campbell finished third behind Tim Graham in the 440 yards event at the 1967 AAA Championships and third behind Martin Winbolt Lewis in the 440 yards event at the 1968 AAA Championships

At the 1968 Olympic Games in Mexico City, he represented Great Britain and reached the second round of the 400 metres event.

Campbell represented England at the 1970 British Commonwealth Games in Edinburgh, Scotland.

At the 1972 AAA Championships, Campbell finished third behind Andy Carter in the 800 metres and just one month later broke the British record in qualifying for the 800m event at the 1972 Olympics Games in Munich, though running with an injury he did not progress out of the first round.

His final major athletics competition was in January 1974, when he represented England at the 1974 British Commonwealth Games in Christchurch, New Zealand

He subsequently answered an advert calling for trialists for the British bobsleigh team and, having successfully competed in these, was selected for the 1976 four-man bob team, where Britain finished 13th.

Campbell retired to Jersey, where he was President of the Jersey Spartans Athletics Club for 15 years. Professionally, he moved between careers in banking and managing athletics and tennis clubs on Jersey. He died on 23 December 2024, at the age of 78.
