= Yuriy Zorin =

Personal information
- Born: September 4, 1947 (age 78) Turinsk, Soviet Union

Sport
- Sport: Track and field
Medal record
Representing Soviet Union
European Championships
| Silver medal – second place | 1969 Athens | 4×400m relay |
European Indoor Championships
| Gold medal – first place | 1970 Vienna | 4×400m relay |
| Silver medal – second place | 1969 Belgrade | Medley relay |
| Bronze medal – third place | 1969 Belgrade | 100 m |
| Bronze medal – third place | 1970 Vienna | 400 m |
Summer Universiade
| Silver medal – second place | 1970 Turin | 4x400m relay |

Yuriy Andreyevich Zorin (Russian: Юрий Зорин; born September 4, 1947) is a former Russian track and field athlete who participated in world athletics representing the Soviet Union in the late 1960s and 1970s. He specialized in the 400 metres hurdles with an eight place at the 1972 Summer Olympics and the 400 metres, winning a bronze medal in Vienna at the 1970 European Indoor Championships in Athletics. He also won a gold medal in the 4 × 200 m relay with fellow Russian athlete Aleksandr Bratchikov, among others.
