= Barbara Wieck =

German middle-distance runner (born 1951)

Personal information
- Nationality: German
- Born: 26 February 1951 (age 75)

Sport
- Sport: Middle-distance running
- Event: 800 metres

Barbara Wieck (born 26 February 1951) is a German middle-distance runner. She competed in the women's 800 metres at the 1968 Summer Olympics.
