= Ramón Magariños =

Spanish sprinter

Personal information
- Nationality: Spanish
- Born: 16 February 1948 (age 78) La Estrada, Spain

Sport
- Sport: Sprinting
- Event: 400 metres
Medal record
Representing Spain
European Indoor Championships
Bronze medal – third place	1968 Madrid	Medley relay
Mediterranean Games
Silver medal – second place	1967 Tunis	4x400m relay

Ramón Magariños Duro (born 16 February 1948) is a Spanish sprinter. He competed in the men's 400 metres at the 1968 Summer Olympics.
