= Boris Savchuk =

Ukrainian sprinter

Personal information
- Nationality: Ukrainian
- Born: 19 August 1943 Dnipropetrovsk, Soviet Union
- Died: 1996 (aged 52–53)

Sport
- Sport: Sprinting
- Event: 200 metres
Medal record
Men's athletics
Representing Soviet Union
European Championships
Silver medal – second place	1966 Budapest	4×100 m relay
Silver medal – second place	1969 Athens	4×400 m relay
European Indoor Championships
Gold medal – first place	1970 Vienna	4×400 m relay
Silver medal – second place	1971 Sofia	400 m
Silver medal – second place	1971 Sofia	4×400 m relay
Summer Universiade
Silver medal – second place	1970 Turin	4x400 m relay

Boris Savchuk (19 August 1943 – 1996) was a Ukrainian sprinter. He competed in the men's 200 metres at the 1964 Summer Olympics representing the Soviet Union.
