= Aleksandr Bratchikov =

Soviet sprinter

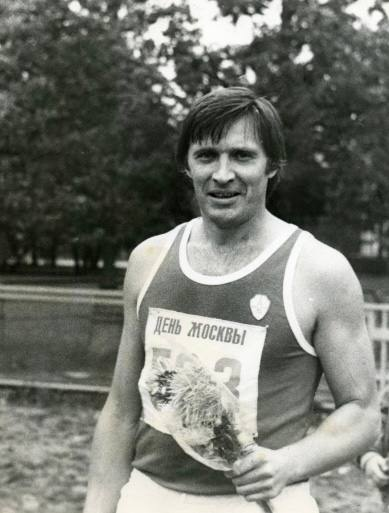

Personal information
- Born: 21 July 1947 (age 79)

Sport
- Sport: Track and field
Medal record
Representing Soviet Union
European Championships
Silver medal – second place	1969 Athens	4 × 400 m relay
European Indoor Championships
Gold medal – first place	1967 Prague	4 × 300 m relay
Gold medal – first place	1968 Madrid	4 × 364 m relay
Gold medal – first place	1970 Vienna	400 m
Silver medal – second place	1967 Prague	Medley relay
Silver medal – second place	1968 Madrid	400 m
Silver medal – second place	1969 Belgrade	4 × 390 m relay
Silver medal – second place	1970 Vienna	4 × 400 m relay
Silver medal – second place	1971 Sofia	4 × 400 m relay
Bronze medal – third place	1971 Sofia	400 m
Summer Universiade
Silver medal – second place	1970 Turin	4 x 400 m relay

Aleksandr Bratchikov (born 21 July 1947) is a former Soviet sprinter who specialized in the 200 and 400 metres.

At the 1966 European Junior Championships he won the gold medal in the 400 metres, as well as a gold medal in the 4 × 400 metres relay. At the 1967 European Indoor Games he won a gold and a silver medal in relay races. At the 1968 European Indoor Games he won a silver medal in the 400 metres as well as a bronze medal in the relay. A silver medal in the relay followed at the 1969 European Indoor Games. At the 1969 European Championships he finished fifth in the 400 metres and won a silver medal in the 4 × 400 metres relay.

At the 1970 European Indoor Championships the Soviet relay team won gold medals. Individually, Bratchikov won a gold medal too. He followed up with a 400 metres bronze medal at the 1971 European Indoor Championships. The 4 × 400 metres relay won silver medals. In the summer he finished seventh in the 400 metres at the 1971 European Championships.

In 1969 he became the Soviet champion in both 200 and 400 metres. He took another 400 metres title in 1971.
