= 1965 European Cup Final (athletics) =

These are the full results of the 1965 European Cup Final in athletics which was held between 11 and 12 September 1967 in Stuttgart, West Germany (men) nad 19 September in Kassel, West Germany (women).

== Team standings ==
Men
Pos.	Nation	Points
1	Soviet Union	86
2	West Germany	85
3	Poland	69
4	East Germany	69
5	France	60
6	Great Britain	48

Women
Pos.	Nation	Points
1	Soviet Union	56
2	East Germany	42
3	Poland	38
4	West Germany	37
5	Hungary	32
6	Netherlands	26

== Men's results ==
=== 100 metres ===
11 September
Wind: -1.1 m/s

Rank	Lane	Name	Nationality	Time	Notes	Points
1	3	Marian Dudziak	Poland	10.3		6
2	4	Manfred Knickenberg	West Germany	10.4		5
3	7	Heinz Erbstößer	East Germany	10.4		4
4	2	Amin Tuyakov	Soviet Union	10.5		3
5	6	Jocelyn Delecour	France	10.5		2
	5	David Jones	Great Britain	DQ		0

=== 200 metres ===
12 September
Wind: +2.9 m/s

Rank	Lane	Name	Nationality	Time	Notes	Points
1	4	Josef Schwarz	West Germany	21.1		6
2	7	Heinz Erbstößer	East Germany	21.2		5
3	6	Jocelyn Delecour	France	21.2		4
4	5	Patrick Morrison	Great Britain	21.2		3
5	2	Edvin Ozolin	Soviet Union	21.3		2
	3	Marian Dudziak	Poland	DQ		0

=== 400 metres ===
11 September

Rank	Lane	Name	Nationality	Time	Notes	Points
1	2	Andrzej Badeński	Poland	45.9		6
2	3	Manfred Kinder	West Germany	46.6		5
3	6	Joachim Both	East Germany	47.1		4
4	4	Michael Fitzgerald	Great Britain	47.4		3
5	5	Michel Samper	France	47.4		2
6	7	Vadym Arkhypchuk	Soviet Union	47.4		1

=== 800 metres ===
12 September

Rank	Name	Nationality	Time	Notes	Points
1	Franz-Josef Kemper	West Germany	1:50.3		6
2	Jürgen May	East Germany	1:50.3		5
3	Chris Carter	Great Britain	1:50.6		4
4	Maurice Lurot	France	1:50.7		3
5	Valery Bulyshev	Soviet Union	1:50.9		2
6	Roland Brehmer	Poland	1:51.8		1

=== 1500 metres ===
11 September

Rank	Name	Nationality	Time	Notes	Points
1	Bodo Tümmler	West Germany	3:47.4		6
2	Jean Wadoux	France	3:48.0		5
3	Jürgen May	East Germany	3:48.3		4
4	Alan Simpson	Great Britain	3:48.4		3
5	Rein Tölp	Soviet Union	3:50.5		2
6	Zbigniew Wójcik	Poland	3:51.5		1

=== 5000 metres ===
12 September

Rank	Name	Nationality	Time	Notes	Points
1	Harald Norpoth	West Germany	14:18.0		6
2	Witold Baran	Poland	14:20.0		5
3	Derek Graham	Great Britain	14:20.4		4
4	Jean Wadoux	France	14:25.8		3
5	Pyotr Bolotnikov	Soviet Union	14:29.0		2
6	Werner Krause	East Germany	14:47.6		1

=== 10,000 metres ===
12 September

Rank	Name	Nationality	Time	Notes	Points
1	Nikolay Dutov	Soviet Union	28:42.2		6
2	Lutz Philipp	West Germany	28:44.8		5
3	Kazimierz Zimny	Poland	28:46.0	NR	4
4	Michael Bullivant	Great Britain	29:33.8		3
5	Klaus Böttger	East Germany	29:44.6		2
6	Michel Jazy	France	30:38.4		1

=== 110 metres hurdles ===
11 September
Wind: +1.7 m/s

Rank	Lane	Name	Nationality	Time	Notes	Points
1	7	Anatoly Mikhaylov	Soviet Union	13.9		6
2	5	Marcel Duriez	France	14.0		5
3	4	Mike Parker	Great Britain	14.5		4
4	3	Hinrich John	West Germany	14.5		3
5	6	Christian Voigt	East Germany	14.7		2
6	2	Adam Kołodziejczyk	Poland	15.0		1

=== 400 metres hurdles ===
12 September

Rank	Name	Nationality	Time	Notes	Points
1	Robert Poirier	France	50.8		6
2	John Cooper	Great Britain	50.9		5
3	Rainer Schubert	West Germany	51.9		4
4	Imants Kukličs	Soviet Union	52.1		3
5	Rainer Schiedewitz	East Germany	52.5		2
6	Włodzimierz Martinek	Poland	52.8		1

=== 3000 metres steeplchase ===
12 September

Rank	Name	Nationality	Time	Notes	Points
1	Viktor Kudynskyy	Soviet Union	8:41.0		6
2	Maurice Herriott	Great Britain	8:42.2		5
3	Edward Szklarczyk	Poland	8:42.8		4
4	Guy Texereau	France	8:47.2		3
5	Manfred Letzerich	West Germany	8:48.4		2
6	Günter Kohler	East Germany	9:12.8		1

=== 4 × 100 metres relay ===
11 September

Rank	Lane	Nation	Athletes	Time	Note	Points
1	4	Soviet Union	Edvin Ozolin, Amin Tuyakov, Boris Savchuk, Nikolay Politiko	39.4		6
2	5	Poland	Andrzej Zieliński, Wiesław Maniak, Edward Romanowski, Marian Dudziak	39.5		5
3	6	West Germany	Hartmurt Wilk, Gert Metz, Dieter Enderlein, Fritz Obersiebrasse	39.5	NR	4
4	2	France	Jean-Paul Lambrot, Alain Roy, Claude Piquemal, Jocelyn Delecour	39.8		3
5	3	East Germany	Heinz Erbstößer, Rainer Berger, Harald Eggers, Detlef Lewandowski	40.2		2
	7	Great Britain	Patrick Morrison, Barrie Kelly, David Jones, Menzies Campbell	DQ		0

=== 4 × 400 metres relay ===
12 September

Rank	Nation	Athletes	Time	Note	Points
1	West Germany	Werner Thiemann, Jens Ulbricht, Hans Reinermann, Manfred Kinder	3:08.3		6
2	Poland	Stanisław Grędziński, Wojciech Lipoński, Sławomir Nowakowski, Andrzej Badeński	3:08.7		5
3	Soviet Union	Imants Kukličs, Viktor Bychkov, Vasily Anisimov, Vadym Arkhypchuk	3:09.0		4
4	East Germany	Günter Klann, Arthur Speer, Hartmurt Schwabe, Joachim Both	3:09.4		3
5	France	Bernard Martin, Michel Hiblot, Robert Poirier, Michel Samper	3:09.7		2
6	Great Britain	Michael Fitzgerald, John Adey, Peter Warden, John Cooper	3:10.6		1

=== High jump ===
11 September

Rank	Name	Nationality	Result	Notes	Points
1	Valeriy Brumel	Soviet Union	2.15		6
2	Wolfgang Schillkowski	West Germany	2.09		5
3	Edward Czernik	Poland	2.07		4
4	Rudi Köppen	East Germany	2.02		3
5	Robert Sainte-Rose	France	1.96		2
6	Crawford Fairbrother	Great Britain	1.91		1

=== Pole vault ===
12 September

Rank	Name	Nationality	Result	Notes	Points
1	Wolfgang Nordwig	East Germany	5.00		6
2	Klaus Lehnertz	West Germany	4.80		5
3	Hennadiy Bleznitsov	Soviet Union	4.80		4
4	Hervé d'Encausse	France	4.70		3
5	Włodzimierz Sokołowski	Poland	4.60		2
6	Dave Stevenson	Great Britain	4.50		1

=== Long jump ===
11 September

Rank	Name	Nationality	#1	#2	#3	#4	#5	#6	Result	Notes	Points
1	Igor Ter-Ovanesyan	Soviet Union	7.54	7.66	7.87	7.32	7.40	7.78	7.87		6
2	Jean Cochard	France	7.39	7.33	5.70	7.37	7.54	x	7.54		5
3	Hans-Helmut Trense	France	7.31	7.52	7.42	7.36	7.24	x	7.52		4
4	Klaus Beer	East Germany	6.93	7.17	7.44	x	x	7.28	7.44		3
5	Fred Alsop	Great Britain	7.31	6.93	7.21	6.90	7.40	6.90	7.40		2
6	Andrzej Stalmach	Poland	7.30	7.33	7.21	7.33	7.28	7.26	7.33		1

=== Triple jump ===
12 September

Rank	Name	Nationality	#1	#2	#3	#4	#5	#6	Result	Notes	Points
1	Hans-Jürgen Rückborn	East Germany	16.09	x	x	16.51	16.30	16.37	16.51	NR	6
2	Aleksandr Zolotarev	Soviet Union	15.87	16.41	16.27	16.06	15.57	x	16.41		5
3	Józef Szmidt	Poland	16.41	x	14.37	x	x	x	16.41		4
4	Fred Alsop	Great Britain	x	15.59	15.87	16.39	16.11	16.29	16.39		3
5	Michael Sauer	West Germany	16.10	15.89	16.14	x	15.93	16.00	16.14		2
6	Éric Battista	France	x	x	x	13.63	14.61	x	14.61		1

=== Shot put ===
11 September

Rank	Name	Nationality	#1	#2	#3	#4	#5	#6	Result	Notes	Points
1	Nikolay Karasyov	Soviet Union	19.19	17.76	x	17.88	x	x	19.19		6
2	Alfred Sosgórnik	Poland	18.07	18.38	x	x	x	x	18.38		5
3	Pierre Colnard	France	18.04	17.58	x	17.44	17.67	17.59	18.04		4
4	Dieter Hoffmann	East Germany	17.49	17.83	17.73	x	18.00	17.74	18.00		3
5	Werner Heger	West Germany	17.79	17.69	17.63	x	17.65	17.54	17.79		2
6	Jeff Teale	Great Britain	16.46	16.52	16.17	16.21	16.52	16.63	16.63		1

=== Discus throw ===
12 September

Rank	Name	Nationality	#1	#2	#3	#4	#5	#6	Result	Notes	Points
1	Zenon Begier	Poland	44.88	54.00	53.92	58.92	x	x	58.92		6
2	Fritz Kühl	East Germany	54.82	55.92	x	x	x	x	55.92		5
3	Kim Bukhantsev	Soviet Union	52.16	54.98	51.64	53.78	53.84	55.00	55.00		4
4	Jens Reimers	West Germany	48.58	52.28	51.06	x	52.90	53.60	53.60		3
5	Mike Lindsay	Great Britain	49.44	x	49.32	x	x	47.38	49.44		2
6	Pierre Alard	France	49.28	48.42	47.70	48.68	47.56	48.26	49.28		1

=== Hammer throw ===
11 September

Rank	Name	Nationality	#1	#2	#3	#4	#5	#6	Result	Notes	Points
1	Romuald Klim	Soviet Union	66.44	x	65.54	67.68	67.48	67.70	67.70		6
2	Uwe Beyer	West Germany	67.28	64.56	x	x	x	64.84	67.28		5
3	Martin Lotz	East Germany	63.12	64.64	65.46	x	64.02	x	65.46		4
4	Olgierd Ciepły	Poland	61.72	x	x	x	60.04	60.32	61.72		3
5	Wladimir Prikhodko	France	58.62	x	x	58.24	x	58.24	58.62		2
6	Howard Payne	Great Britain	56.12	57.72	56.32	57.20	56.76	55.98	57.72		1

=== Javelin throw ===
12 September – Old model

Rank	Name	Nationality	#1	#2	#3	#4	#5	#6	Result	Notes	Points
1	Jānis Lūsis	Soviet Union	78.88	75.36	81.22	76.66	72.48	82.56	82.56		6
2	Janusz Sidło	Poland	81.18	78.98	78.06	x	77.08	x	81.18		5
3	Manfred Stolle	East Germany	43.56	x	69.86	79.98	75.68	x	79.98		4
4	Christian Monneret	France	70.60	68.94	74.92	77.38	70.08	74.02	77.38		3
5	Dave Travis	Great Britain	72.48	69.74	65.70	72.50	69.60	76.18	76.18		2
6	Rolf Herings	West Germany	69.36	71.26	x	71.24	72.20	x	72.20		1

== Women's results ==
=== 100 metres ===
19 September
Wind: 0.0 m/s

Rank	Name	Nationality	Time	Notes	Points
1	Ewa Kłobukowska	Poland	11.3		6
2	Erika Pollmann	West Germany	11.6		5
3	Galina Mitrokhina	Soviet Union	11.6		4
4	Margit Nemesházi	Hungary	11.6		3
5	Lidy Vonk	Netherlands	11.9		2
6	Ingrid Tiedtke	East Germany	11.9		1

=== 200 metres ===
19 September
Wind: 0.0 m/s

Rank	Name	Nationality	Time	Notes	Points
1	Ewa Kłobukowska	Poland	23.0		6
2	Ingrid Becker	West Germany	24.0		5
3	Vera Popkova	Soviet Union	24.1		4
4	Gundula Diel	East Germany	24.1		3
5	Truus Cruiming	Netherlands	24.3		2
6	Margit Nemesházi	Hungary	24.5		1

=== 400 metres ===
19 September

Rank	Name	Nationality	Time	Notes	Points
1	Mariya Itkina	Soviet Union	54.0		6
2	Hilde Slaman	Netherlands	54.6		5
3	Gertrud Schmidt	East Germany	54.9		4
4	Antónia Munkácsi	Hungary	55.3		3
5	Celina Gerwin	Poland	56.1		2
6	Christine Linz	West Germany	56.3		1

=== 800 metres ===
19 September

Rank	Name	Nationality	Time	Notes	Points
1	Hannelore Suppe	East Germany	2:04.3	NR	6
2	Ilja Laman	Netherlands	2:04.6		5
3	Antje Gleichfeld	West Germany	2:04.7		4
4	Zsuzsa Nagy	Hungary	2:04.9		3
5	Vera Mukhanova	Soviet Union	2:07.1		2
6	Danuta Sobieska	Poland	2:08.9		1

=== 80 metres hurdles ===
19 September
Wind: +1.7 m/s

Rank	Name	Nationality	Time	Notes	Points
1	Irina Press	Soviet Union	10.4	=WR	6
2	Gundula Diel	East Germany	10.5		5
3	Inge Schell	West Germany	10.6	NR	4
4	Lia Hinten	Netherlands	10.8		3
5	Annamária Kovács	Hungary	11.4		2
6	Elżbieta Bednarek	Poland	12.4		1

=== 4 × 100 metres relay ===
11 September

Rank	Nation	Athletes	Time	Note	Points
1	Poland	Teresa Ciepły, Elżbieta Kolejwa, Irena Kirszenstein, Ewa Kłobukowska	44.9		6
2	Soviet Union	Galina Mitrokhina, Vera Popkova, Lyudmila Samotyosova, Tatyana Talysheva	45.2		5
3	East Germany	Angela Höhme, Ingrid Tiedtke, Ursula Böhm, Gundula Diel	45.7		4
4	Hungary	Erszébet Heldt, Annamária Kovács, Ida Such, Margit Nemesházi	46.2		3
5	Netherlands	Truus Cruiming, Lia Hinten, Hilde Slaman, Lidy Vonk	46.9		2
6	West Germany	Gerlinde Beyrischen, Hannelore Trabert, Inge Schell, Erika Pollmann	50.1		1

=== High jump ===
19 September

Rank	Name	Nationality	Result	Notes	Points
1	Taisia Chenchik	Soviet Union	1.70		6
2	Karin Rüger	East Germany	1.70		5
3	Jarosława Bieda	Poland	1.64		4
4	Marjana Thomas	Netherlands	1.64		3
5	Ilia Hans	West Germany	1.64		2
6	Eva Gelei	Hungary	1.61		1

=== Long jump ===
19 September

Rank	Name	Nationality	#1	#2	#3	#4	#5	#6	Result	Notes	Points
1	Tatyana Shchelkanova	Soviet Union	4.92	6.68w	x	x	x	6.57w	6.68w		6
2	Irena Kirszenstein	Poland	x	6.28w	6.34w	6.16	6.28w	x	6.34w		5
3	Helga Hoffmann	West Germany	6.19	6.08	6.30w	x	6.19	6.22w	6.30w		4
4	Burghild Wieczorek	East Germany	6.05	6.20w	x	6.17	6.13	5.97	6.20w		3
5	Etelka Kispál	Hungary	6.04	6.13w	x	x	x	x	6.13w		2
6	Hilly Gankema	Netherlands	5.45	5.23w	5.29	5.09	5.15	x	5.45		1

=== Shot put ===
19 September

Rank	Name	Nationality	#1	#2	#3	#4	#5	#6	Result	Notes	Points
1	Tamara Press	Soviet Union	18.59	17.83	17.70	x	16.96	16.73	18.59	WR	6
2	Renate Garisch	East Germany	x	16.22	16.42	16.72	x	16.96	16.96		5
3	Gertrud Schäfer	West Germany	15.37	16.02	x	15.54	16.18	15.28	16.18		4
4	Judit Bognár	Hungary	14.82	14.84	15.36	x	15.33	15.23	15.36		3
5	Eugenia Ciarkowska	Poland	13.64	14.42	x	13.52	13.51	13.53	14.42		2
6	Loes Boling	Netherlands	14.37	14.20	x	13.88	13.88	14.02	14.37		1

=== Discus throw ===
19 September

Rank	Name	Nationality	#1	#2	#3	#4	#5	#6	Result	Notes	Points
1	Jolán Kleiber	Hungary	54.98	56.75	55.05	53.55	55.30	53.93	56.75		6
2	Tamara Press	Soviet Union	54.83	51.58	52.48	51.19	x	53.73	54.83		5
3	Ingrid Lotz	East Germany	53.89	52.18	x	x	x	x	53.89		4
4	Kriemhild Limberg	West Germany	51.06	x	x	x	51.54	x	51.54		3
5	Kazimiera Rykowska	Poland	x	38.13	39.68	47.34	50.50	49.68	50.50		2
6	Loes Boling	Netherlands	39.22	43.10	42.36	42.33	x	42.26	43.10		1

=== Javelin throw ===
19 September – Old model

Rank	Name	Nationality	#1	#2	#3	#4	#5	#6	Result	Notes	Points
1	Yelena Gorchakova	Soviet Union	5.18	54.61	58.49	54.58	x	52.65	58.49		6
2	Márta Rudas	Hungary	x	55.79	50.39	53.95	x	50.19	55.79		5
3	Anneliese Gerhards	West Germany	47.64	50.05	50.45	x	53.00	50.16	53.00		4
4	Daniela Tarkowska	Poland	49.24	51.69	50.60	x	50.43	x	51.69		3
5	Helga Börner	East Germany	47.88	50.04	49.53	47.73	x	48.15	50.04		2
6	Greet Versterre	East Germany	35.54	39.55	45.03	x	40.85	43.74	45.03		1
