= 1965 European Cup (athletics) =

- Host city: Stuttgart, West Germany (men); Kassel, West Germany (women)
- Level: Senior
- Type: Outdoor
- Events: 31

The 1965 European Cup was the 1st edition of the European Cup of athletics.

The Finals were held in West Germany, Stuttgart (men) and Kassel (women).

== Final ==
Held in Stuttgart on 11 and 12 September (men) and Kassel on 19 September (women).

=== Team standings ===
Men
Pos.	Nation	Points
1	Soviet Union	86
2	West Germany	85
3	Poland	69
4	East Germany	69
5	France	60
6	Great Britain	48

Women
Pos.	Nation	Points
1	Soviet Union	56
2	East Germany	42
3	Poland	38
4	West Germany	37
5	Hungary	32
6	Netherlands	26

=== Results summary ===
==== Men's events ====
Event	Gold		Silver		Bronze	
100 m (Wind: -1.1 m/s)	Marian Dudziak; Poland	10.3	Manfred Knickenberg; West Germany	10.4	Heinz Erbstösser; East Germany	10.5
200 m (Wind: +2.9 m/s)	Josef Schwarz; West Germany	21.1w	Heinz Erbstösser; East Germany	21.2w	Jocelyn Delecour; France	21.2w
400 m	Andrzej Badeński; Poland	45.9	Manfred Kinder; West Germany	46.6	Joachim Both; East Germany	47.1
800 m	Franz-Josef Kemper; West Germany	1:50.5	Jürgen May; East Germany	1:50.3	Chris Carter; Great Britain	1:50.6
1500 m	Bodo Tümmler; West Germany	3:47.4	Jean Wadoux; France	3:48.0	Jürgen May; East Germany	3:48.4
5000 m	Harald Norpoth; West Germany	14:18.0	Witold Baran; Poland	14:20.0	Derek Graham; Great Britain	14:20.4
10,000 m	Nikolay Dutov; Soviet Union	28:42.2	Lutz Philipp; West Germany	28:44.8	Kazimierz Zimny; Poland	28:46.0
3000 m steeplechase	Viktor Kudinskiy; Soviet Union	8:41.0	Maurice Herriott; Great Britain	8:42.2	Edward Szklarczyk; Poland	8:42.8
110 m hurdles (Wind: -1.7 m/s)	Anatoliy Mikhailov; Soviet Union	13.9	Marcel Duriez; France	14.0	Mike Parker; Great Britain	14.5
400 m hurdles	Robert Poirier; France	50.8	John Cooper; Great Britain	50.9	Rainer Schubert; West Germany	51.9
4 × 100 m	Soviet Union; Edvin Ozolin; Amin Tuyakov; Boris Savchuk; Nikolay Politiko	39.4	Poland; Andrzej Zieliński; Wiesław Maniak; Edward Romanowski; Marian Dudziak	39.5	West Germany; Hartmurt Wilke; Gert Metz; Dieter Enderlein; Fritz Obersiebrasse	39.5
4 × 400 m	West Germany; Werner Thiemann; Jens Ulbricht; Hans Reinermann; Manfred Kinder	3:08.3	Poland; Stanisław Grędziński; Wojciech Lipoński; Sławomir Nowakowski; Andrzej Badeński	3:08.7	Soviet Union; Imants Kuklich; Viktor Bychkov; Vasily Anisimov; Vadim Arkhipchuk	3:09.0
High jump	Valeriy Brumel; Soviet Union	2.14	Wolfgang Schillkowski; West Germany	2.09	Edward Czernik; Poland	2.07
Pole vault	Wolfgang Nordwig; East Germany	5.00	Klaus Lehnertz; West Germany	4.80	Hennadiy Bleznitsov; Soviet Union	4.80
Long jump	Igor Ter-Ovanesyan; Soviet Union	7.86	Jean Cochard; France	7.52	Hans-Helmut Trense; West Germany	7.51
Triple jump	Hans-Jürgen Rückborn; East Germany	16.51	Aleksandr Zolotaryov; Soviet Union	16.40	Józef Schmidt; Poland	16.40
Shot put	Nikolay Karasyov; Soviet Union	19.19	Alfred Sosgórnik; Poland	18.37	Pierre Colnard; France	18.04
Discus throw	Zenon Begier; Poland	58.92	Fritz Kühl; East Germany	55.92	Kim Bukhantsev; Soviet Union	55.00
Hammer throw	Romuald Klim; Soviet Union	67.68	Uwe Beyer; West Germany	67.28	Martin Lotz; East Germany	65.46
Javelin throw	Jānis Lūsis; Soviet Union	82.56	Janusz Sidło; Poland	81.18	Manfred Stolle; East Germany	79.98
WR world record | AR area record | CR championship record | GR games record | NR national record | OR Olympic record | PB personal best | SB season best | WL world leading (in a given season)

==== Women's events ====
Event	Gold		Silver		Bronze	
100 m (Wind: +0.5 m/s)	Ewa Kłobukowska; Poland	11.3	Erika Pollmann; West Germany	11.6	Galina Mitrokhina; Soviet Union	11.6
200 m	Ewa Kłobukowska; Poland	23.0	Ingrid Becker; West Germany	24.0	Vera Popkova; Soviet Union	24.1
400 m	Mariya Itkina; Soviet Union	54.0	Hilde Slaman; Netherlands	54.6	Gertrud Schmidt; East Germany	54.9
800 m	Hannelore Suppe; East Germany	2:04.3	Ilja Laman; Netherlands	2:04.6	Antje Gleichfeld; West Germany	2:04.7
80 m hurdles (Wind: +1.1 m/s)	Irina Press; Soviet Union	10.4; WR	Gundula Diel; East Germany	10.5	Inge Schell; West Germany	10.6
4 × 100 m	Poland; Teresa Ciepły; Elżbieta Kolejwa; Irena Kirszenstein; Ewa Kłobukowska	44.9	Soviet Union; Galina Mitrokhina; Vera Popkova; Lyudmila Samotesova; Tatyana Talysheva	45.2	East Germany; Angela Höhme; Ingrid Tiedtke; Ursula Böhm; Gundula Diel	45.7
High jump	Taisiya Chenchik; Soviet Union	1.70	Karin Rüger; East Germany	1.70	Jarosława Bieda; Poland	1.63
Long jump	Tatyana Shchelkanova; Soviet Union	6.63	Irena Kirszenstein; Poland	6.33	Helga Hoffmann; West Germany	6.30
Shot put	Tamara Press; Soviet Union	18.59; WR	Renate Garisch; East Germany	16.96	Gertrud Schäfer; West Germany	16.17
Discus throw	Jolán Kleiber; Hungary	56.74	Tamara Press; Soviet Union	54.82	Ingrid Lotz; East Germany	53.82
Javelin throw	Yelena Gorchakova; Soviet Union	58.48	Márta Rudas; Hungary	55.78	Anneliese Gerhards; West Germany	52.98
WR world record | AR area record | CR championship record | GR games record | NR national record | OR Olympic record | PB personal best | SB season best | WL world leading (in a given season)

== Semifinals ==
=== Men ===
All semifinals were held on 21 and 22 August.

Semifinal 1
Held in Rome

Pos.	Nation	Points
1	West Germany	96
2	Poland	85
3	Czechoslovakia	81
4	Italy	67
5	Bulgaria	45
6	Switzerland	45

Semifinal 2
Held in Zagreb

Pos.	Nation	Points
1	East Germany	90
2	Great Britain	89
3	Sweden	81
4	Romania	66
5	Yugoslavia	52
6	Netherlands	41

Semifinal 3
Held in Oslo

Pos.	Nation	Points
1	Soviet Union	94
2	France	92
3	Hungary	72
4	Finland	64
5	Norway	51
6	Belgium	41

=== Women ===
All semifinals were held on 22 August.

Semifinal 1
Held in Leipzig

Pos.	Nation	Points
1	East Germany	58
2	Poland	56
3	Czechoslovakia	39
4	Sweden	30
5	Italy	24
6	Denmark	23

Semifinal 2
Held in Fontainebleau

Pos.	Nation	Points
1	Hungary	50
2	Netherlands	47
3	Great Britain	46
4	France	38
5	Bulgaria	33
6	Belgium	14

Semifinal 3
Held in Constanța

Pos.	Nation	Points
1	Soviet Union	53
2	West Germany	53
3	Romania	49.5
4	Yugoslavia	25.5
5	Norway	25
6	Austria	24

== Preliminaries ==
=== Men ===
All preliminaries were held on 26-27 July.

Preliminary 1
Held in Vienna

Pos.	Nation	Points
1	Switzerland	62
2	Austria	61
3	Greece	47
4	Luxembourg	27

Preliminary 2
Held in Enschede

Pos.	Nation	Points
1	Netherlands	60
2	Spain	58
3	Denmark	49
4	Portugal	33
