= Athletics at the 1965 Summer Universiade – Men's 4 × 100 metres relay =

The men's 4 × 100 metres relay event at the 1965 Summer Universiade was held at the People's Stadium in Budapest on 26 and 29 August 1965.

== Results ==
=== Heats ===
Rank	Heat	Nation	Athletes	Time	Notes
1	1	West Germany		40.6	Q
2	1	Hungary	Huba Rozsnyai, Gyula Rábai, László Mihályfi, Csaba Csutorás	40.7	Q
3	1	Bulgaria	Pavel Vidinski, Veselin Valov, Ivan Tzankov, Stefan Penchev	41.7	Q
4	1	Spain	Jenaro Talens, Lorenzo Riezu, José Luis Sánchez Paraíso, Rogelio Rivas	42.0	Q
5	1	Brazil	Admilson Chitarra, Jorge de Barros, Marcio Dornelles, Pereira	42.1	
	1	Italy	Orazio Parisotto, Pietro Paolo Montanari, Ito Giani, Livio Berruti	DQ	Q
1	2	Soviet Union	Nikolay Politiko, Edvin Ozolin, Boris Zubov, Igor Ter-Ovanesyan	40.4	Q
2	2	France	Alain Roy, Jean-Paul Lambrot, Marc Bienvenu, Pierre Burrellier	40.7	Q
3	2	Japan	Hideo Iijima, Toshio Daiku, Naoki Abe, Toru Honda	41.0	Q
4	2	Poland	Wiesław Maniak, Edward Romanowski, Włodzimierz Anielak, Gerard Gramse	41.2	Q
5	2	Great Britain	Jim Barry, Jeff Archer, Menzies Campbell, John Kilpatrick	41.2	
6	2	Switzerland	Max Barandun, Hansbert Suter, Mathias Jerman, Rudolf Oegerli	41.6	
7	2	Cuba	Abelardo Pacheco, Luis Torres, Manuel Montalvo, Hermes Ramírez	42.0	

=== Final ===
Rank	Nation	Athletes	Time	Notes
1st place, gold medalist(s)	West Germany	Gert Metz, Fritz Obersiebrasse, Hans-Jürgen Felsen, Rudolf Sundermann	39.9	
2nd place, silver medalist(s)	Soviet Union	Nikolay Politiko, Edvin Ozolin, Boris Zubov, Igor Ter-Ovanesyan	40.1	
3rd place, bronze medalist(s)	France	Alain Roy, Jean-Paul Lambrot, Marc Bienvenu, Pierre Burrellier	40.3	
4	Hungary	Huba Rozsnyai, Gyula Rábai, László Mihályfi, Csaba Csutorás	40.7	
5	Poland	Wiesław Maniak, Edward Romanowski, Włodzimierz Anielak, Gerard Gramse	41.0	
6	Spain	Jenaro Talens, Lorenzo Riezu, José Luis Sánchez Paraíso, Rogelio Rivas	41.2	
7	Bulgaria	Pavel Vidinski, Veselin Valov, Ivan Tzankov, Stefan Penchev	41.6	
	Japan	Hideo Iijima, Toshio Daiku, Naoki Abe, Toru Honda	DNF	
