= 1966 European Athletics Championships – Men's 100 metres =

Men's 100 metres at the 1966 European Athletics Championships
- Venue: Népstadion
- Location: Budapest
- Dates: 30 August (heats); 31 August (semifinals & final)
- Competitors: 36 from 18 nations
- Winning time: 10.60

Medalists
gold medal	Wiesław Maniak	Poland
silver medal	Roger Bambuck	France
bronze medal	Claude Piquemal	France

The men's 100 metres at the 1966 European Athletics Championships was held in Budapest, Hungary, at Népstadion on 30 and 31 August 1966.

== Participation ==
According to an unofficial count, 36 athletes from 18 countries participated in the event.

- Albania (1)
- Belgium (1)
- Czechoslovakia (3)
- East Germany (2)
- France (3)
- Gibraltar (1)
- Greece (1)
- Hungary (3)
- Italy (3)
- Netherlands (1)
- Poland (3)
- Romania (1)
- Soviet Union (3)
- Spain (1)
- Switzerland (2)
- Turkey (1)
- Great Britain (3)
- West Germany (3)

== Results ==
=== Heats ===
30 August

==== Heat 1 ====
Rank	Name	Nationality	Time	Notes
1	Wiesław Maniak	Poland	10.7	Q
2	Ippolito Giani	Italy	10.7	Q
3	Menzies Campbell	Great Britain	10.7	Q
4	Harald Eggers	East Germany	10.7	Q
5	Juraj Demeč	Czechoslovakia	10.8	
6	Huba Rozsnyai	Hungary	11.0	
			Wind: -1.3 m/s	

==== Heat 2 ====
Rank	Name	Nationality	Time	Notes
1	Manfred Knickenberg	West Germany	10.6	Q
2	Włodzimierz Anielak	Poland	10.8	Q
3	Jacques Vanhee	Belgium	10.8	Q
4	Ron Jones	Great Britain	10.8	Q
	Herbert Bende	Czechoslovakia	DQ	
			Wind: -0.1 m/s	

==== Heat 3 ====
Rank	Name	Nationality	Time	Notes
1	Roger Bambuck	France	10.4	Q
2	Heinz Erbstösser	East Germany	10.6	Q
3	Gerd Metz	West Germany	10.6	Q
4	Gheorghe Zamfirescu	Romania	10.7	Q
5	Lajos Hajdú	Hungary	10.8	
6	Petr Utekal	Czechoslovakia	10.9	
7	Joseph Cassaglia	Gibraltar	12.4	
			Wind: 0.0 m/s	

==== Heat 4 ====
Rank	Name	Nationality	Time	Notes
1	Barrie Kelly	Great Britain	10.7	Q
2	Marc Berger	France	10.7	Q
3	Hans-Jürgen Felsen	West Germany	10.8	Q
4	Edvin Ozolin	Soviet Union	10.8	Q
5	József Istóczky	Hungary	10.8	
6	Tadeusz Jaworski	Poland	10.9	
			Wind: 0.0 m/s	

==== Heat 5 ====
Rank	Name	Nationality	Time	Notes
1	Claude Piquemal	France	10.7	Q
2	Angelo Squazzero	Italy	10.8	Q
3	Hans Hönger	Switzerland	10.8	Q
4	Aleksandr Lebedev	Soviet Union	10.8	Q
5	José Luis Sánchez Paraíso	Spain	10.9	
6	Tomi Stefanllari	Albania	11.3	
			Wind: -0.1 m/s	

==== Heat 6 ====
Rank	Name	Nationality	Time	Notes
1	Pasquale Giannattasio	Italy	10.5	Q
2	Nikolay Ivanov	Soviet Union	10.6	Q
3	Panagiotis Nikolaidis	Greece	10.7	Q
4	Max Barandun	Switzerland	10.8	Q
5	Rob Heemskerk	Netherlands	10.8	
6	Sonar Coşan	Turkey	11.0	
			Wind: 0.0 m/s	

=== Semi-finals ===
31 August

==== Semi-final 1 ====
Rank	Name	Nationality	Time	Notes
1	Roger Bambuck	France	10.62	Q
2	Ippolito Giani	Italy	10.74	Q
3	Barrie Kelly	Great Britain	10.81	Q
4	Hans-Jürgen Felsen	West Germany	10.82	
5	Gheorghe Zamfirescu	Romania	10.86	
6	Włodzimierz Anielak	Poland	10.91	
7	Edvin Ozolin	Soviet Union	10.94	
8	Heinz Erbstösser	East Germany	10.95	
			Wind: +0.6 m/s	

==== Semi-final 2 ====
Rank	Name	Nationality	Time	Notes
1	Pasquale Giannattasio	Italy	10.7	Q
2	Claude Piquemal	France	10.7	Q
3	Gerd Metz	West Germany	10.8	
4	Aleksandr Lebedev	Soviet Union	10.9	
5	Ron Jones	Great Britain	10.9	
6	Panagiotis Nikolaidis	Greece	11.0	
7	Hans Hönger	Switzerland	11.2	
	Harald Eggers	East Germany	DQ	
			Wind: -1.3 m/s	

==== Semi-final 3 ====
Rank	Name	Nationality	Time	Notes
1	Manfred Knickenberg	West Germany	10.6	Q
2	Wiesław Maniak	Poland	10.6	Q
3	Nikolay Ivanov	Soviet Union	10.7	Q
4	Menzies Campbell	Great Britain	10.8	
5	Marc Berger	France	10.8	
6	Jacques Vanhee	Belgium	10.9	
7	Max Barandun	Switzerland	11.0	
	Angelo Squazzero	Italy	DNS	
			Wind: -0.6 m/s	

=== Final ===
31 August

Rank	Name	Nationality	Time	Notes
1st place, gold medalist(s)	Wiesław Maniak	Poland	10.60	
2nd place, silver medalist(s)	Roger Bambuck	France	10.61	
3rd place, bronze medalist(s)	Claude Piquemal	France	10.62	
4	Manfred Knickenberg	West Germany	10.62	
5	Ippolito Giani	Italy	10.71	
6	Barrie Kelly	Great Britain	10.76	
7	Nikolay Ivanov	Soviet Union	10.82	
8	Pasquale Giannattasio	Italy	20.1	
			Wind: -0.6 m/s	
