= Athletics at the 1965 Summer Universiade – Men's 100 metres =

The men's 100 metres event at the 1965 Summer Universiade was held at the People's Stadium in Budapest on 25 and 26 August 1965.

== Medalists ==
Gold	Silver	Bronze
Hideo Iijima; Japan	George Anderson; United States	Harry Jerome; Canada

== Results ==
=== Heats ===
Held on 25 August

Rank	Heat	Athlete	Nationality	Time	Notes
1	1	Hideo Iijima	Japan	10.1	Q
2	1	Jenaro Talens	Spain	10.9	Q
3	1	Gheorghe Zamfirescu	Romania	11.0	Q
4	1	Gerd Nöster	Austria	11.0	Q
5	1	Marcio Dornelles	Brazil	11.1	
6	1	Ali Mzoughi	Tunisia	11.4	
1	2	Fritz Obersiebrasse	West Germany	10.7	Q
2	2	Harry Jerome	Canada	10.8	Q
3	2	Herbert Bende	Czechoslovakia	11.0	Q
4	2	Lajos Hajdú	Hungary	11.1	Q
5	2	Wim Smit	Netherlands	11.1	
6	2	Ivica Karasi	Yugoslavia	11.2	
7	2	Mohamed Moncef Chtai	Tunisia	11.6	
1	3	Enrique Figuerola	Cuba	10.7	Q
2	3	Hans-Jürgen Felsen	West Germany	10.8	Q
3	3	Edwin Ozolin	Soviet Union	10.9	Q
4	3	Toshio Daiku	Japan	11.0	Q
5	3	Rudolf Oegerli	Switzerland	11.1	
6	3	Panagiotis Nikolaidis	Greece	11.3	
7	3	Sonar Coşan	Turkey	11.6	
1	4	Nikolay Politiko	Soviet Union	10.6	Q
2	4	Menzies Campbell	Great Britain	10.6	Q
3	4	Wiesław Maniak	Poland	10.7	Q
4	4	Ito Giani	Italy	10.9	Q
5	4	Ignace Van der Cam	Belgium	11.1	
6	4	Admilson Chitarra	Brazil	11.1	
1	5	George Anderson	United States	10.3	Q
2	5	Max Barandun	Switzerland	10.4	Q
3	5	Hermes Ramírez	Cuba	10.4	Q
4	5	Jean-Paul Lambrot	France	10.4	Q
5	5	Herman van Coppenolle	Belgium	10.8	
6	5	Axel Nepraunik	Austria	10.8	
	5	Pavel Vidinski	Bulgaria	DQ	
1	6	Edward Romanowski	Poland	10.8	Q
2	6	Lynn Davies	Great Britain	10.8	Q
3	6	Huba Rozsnyai	Hungary	10.9	Q
4	6	José Luis Sánchez Paraíso	Spain	10.9	Q
5	6	Livio Berruti	Italy	10.9	
6	6	Jean-Pierre Delord	France	11.0	
7	6	Petr Utekal	Czechoslovakia	11.0	

=== Semifinals ===
Held on 26 August

Wind:
Heat 1: +1.0 m/s, Heat 2: +1.5 m/s, Heat 3: +0.7 m/s, Heat 4: +3.3 m/s

Rank	Heat	Athlete	Nationality	Time	Notes
1	1	George Anderson	United States	10.3	Q, =UR
2	1	Fritz Obersiebrasse	West Germany	10.3	Q, =UR
3	1	Ito Giani	Italy	10.7	
4	1	José Luis Sánchez Paraíso	Spain	10.7	
5	1	Lajos Hajdú	Hungary	10.8	
1	2	Hideo Iijima	Japan	10.4	Q
2	2	Wiesław Maniak	Poland	10.5	Q
3	2	Max Barandun	Switzerland	10.5	
4	2	Edwin Ozolin	Soviet Union	10.5	
5	2	Huba Rozsnyai	Hungary	10.7	
6	2	Gerd Nöster	Austria	10.9	
1	3	Harry Jerome	Canada	10.3	Q, =UR
2	3	Nikolay Politiko	Soviet Union	10.5	Q
3	3	Hermes Ramírez	Cuba	10.6	
4	3	Jenaro Talens	Spain	10.6	
5	3	Lynn Davies	Great Britain	10.7	
1	4	Menzies Campbell	Great Britain	10.4	Q
2	4	Hans-Jürgen Felsen	West Germany	10.4	Q
3	4	Jean-Paul Lambrot	France	10.6	
4	4	Edward Romanowski	Poland	10.6	
5	4	Toshio Daiku	Japan	10.8	
6	4	Herbert Bende	Czechoslovakia	10.9	
	?	Gheorghe Zamfirescu	Romania	?	
	?	Enrique Figuerola	Cuba	DNS	

=== Final ===
Held on 26 August

Wind: +5.0 m/s

Rank	Name	Nationality	Time	Notes
1st place, gold medalist(s)	Hideo Iijima	Japan	10.1	UR
2nd place, silver medalist(s)	George Anderson	United States	10.1	
3rd place, bronze medalist(s)	Harry Jerome	Canada	10.2	
4	Wiesław Maniak	Poland	10.3	
5	Fritz Obersiebrasse	West Germany	10.3	
6	Hans-Jürgen Felsen	West Germany	10.3	
7	Menzies Campbell	Great Britain	10.4	
8	Nikolay Politiko	Soviet Union	10.4	
