= 1966 European Athletics Championships – Men's 4 × 100 metres relay =

Men's 4 × 100 metres relay at the European Athletics Championships

The men's 4 × 100 metres relay at the 1966 European Athletics Championships was held in Budapest, Hungary, at Népstadion on 3 and 4 September 1966.

== Medalists ==
Gold	Marc Berger; Jocelyn Delecour; Claude Piquemal; Roger Bambuck; France
Silver	Edvin Ozolin; Amin Tuyakov; Boris Savchuk; Nikolay Ivanov; Soviet Union
Bronze	Hans-Jürgen Felsen; Gerd Metz; Dieter Enderlein; Manfred Knickenberg; West Germany

== Results ==
=== Final ===
4 September

Rank	Nation	Competitors	Time	Notes
1st place, gold medalist(s)	France	Marc Berger; Jocelyn Delecour; Claude Piquemal; Roger Bambuck	39.4	CR
2nd place, silver medalist(s)	Soviet Union	Edvin Ozolin; Amin Tuyakov; Boris Savchuk; Nikolay Ivanov	39.8	
3rd place, bronze medalist(s)	West Germany	Hans-Jürgen Felsen; Gerd Metz; Dieter Enderlein; Manfred Knickenberg	39.8	
4	East Germany	Harald Eggers; Rainer Berger; Heinz Erbstösser; Hermann Burde	40.0	
5	Great Britain	Lynn Davies; Ron Jones; Menzies Campbell; Barrie Kelly	40.1	
6	Italy	Ennio Preatoni; Ippolito Giani; Nello Simoncelli; Sergio Ottolina	40.2	
7	Czechoslovakia	Petr Utekal; Herbert Bende; Jiří Kynos; Ladislav Kříž	40.6	
8	Netherlands	Piet Tamminga; Leo de Winter; Wim Blom; Rob Heemskerk	40.7	

=== Heats ===
3 September

==== Heat 1 ====
Rank	Nation	Competitors	Time	Notes
1	East Germany	Harald Eggers; Heinz Erbstösser; Rainer Berger; Hermann Burde	39.8	Q
2	Italy	Ennio Preatoni; Ippolito Giani; Nello Simoncelli; Sergio Ottolina	40.0	Q
3	Great Britain	Lynn Davies; Ron Jones; Menzies Campbell; Barrie Kelly	40.0	Q
4	Netherlands	Piet Tamminga; Leo de Winter; Wim Blom; Rob Heemskerk	40.0	Q
5	Poland	Włodzimierz Anielak; Jan Werner; Marian Dudziak; Wiesław Maniak	40.6	
6	Greece	Panagiotis Nikolaidis; Haris Aivaliotis; Nikolaos Argiris; Georgios Mikelidis	41.4	
7	Albania	Tomi Stefanllari; Bashkim Pacrami; Rasim Kraja; Clirim Balluku	42.8	

==== Heat 2 ====
Rank	Nation	Competitors	Time	Notes
1	France	Marc Berger; Jocelyn Delecour; Claude Piquemal; Roger Bambuck	39.5	CR Q
2	West Germany	Manfred Knickenberg; Dieter Enderlein; Hans-Jürgen Felsen; Gerd Metz	39.8	Q
3	Soviet Union	Edvin Ozolin; Amin Tuyakov; Boris Savchuk; Nikolay Ivanov	39.8	Q
4	Czechoslovakia	Petr Utekal; Herbert Bende; Jiří Kynos; Ladislav Kříž	40.6	Q
5	Hungary	Imre Babos; Huba Rozsnyai; Lajos Hajdú; Gyula Rábai	40.7	

== Participation ==
According to an unofficial count, 48 athletes from 12 countries participated in the event.

- Albania (4)
- Czechoslovakia (4)
- East Germany (4)
- France (4)
- Greece (4)
- Hungary (4)
- Italy (4)
- Netherlands (4)
- Poland (4)
- Soviet Union (4)
- Great Britain (4)
- West Germany (4)
