= Athletics at the 1965 Summer Universiade – Men's 200 metres =

The men's 200 metres event at the 1965 Summer Universiade was held at the People's Stadium in Budapest on 27 and 28 August 1965.

== Medalists ==
Gold	Silver	Bronze
Edvin Ozolin; Soviet Union	George Anderson; United States	Menzies Campbell; Great Britain

== Results ==
=== Heats ===
Held on 27 August

Wind:
Heat 4: +1.9 m/s

Rank	Heat	Athlete	Nationality	Time	Notes
1	1	Manuel Montalvo	Cuba	21.6	Q
2	1	Pierre Burrelier	France	21.9	Q
3	1	Ignace Van der Cam	Belgium	21.9	Q
4	1	Viktor Eichler	Czechoslovakia	21.9	Q
5	1	Wim Smit	Netherlands	22.0	
	1	Jim Barry	Great Britain	DQ	
1	2	Menzies Campbell	Great Britain	21.1	Q
2	2	Alain Roy	France	21.6	Q
3	2	Harry Jerome	Canada	21.7	Q
4	2	Ruedi Oegerli	Switzerland	21.9	Q
5	2	Ivan Tzankov	Bulgaria	22.0	
6	2	Axel Nepraunik	Austria	22.5	
1	3	Edward Romanowski	Poland	21.4	Q
2	3	Ivica Karasi	Yugoslavia	22.2	Q
3	3	Alan Brereton	Canada	22.3	Q
4	3	Fred van Herpen	Netherlands	22.4	Q
5	3	Mohamed Moncef Chtai	Tunisia	22.6	
1	4	George Anderson	United States	21.?	Q
2	4	Livio Berruti	Italy	21.1	Q
3	4	Edvin Ozolin	Soviet Union	21.3	Q
4	4	Wiesław Maniak	Poland	21.4	Q
5	4	Anders Lärkert	Sweden	21.4	
6	4	Herbert Bende	Czechoslovakia	21.6	
1	5	Ito Giani	Italy	21.5	Q
2	5	Heinz-Uwe Bordtheiser	West Germany	21.6	Q
3	5	Toru Honda	Japan	21.8	Q
4	5	Jenaro Talens	Spain	21.8	Q
5	5	Gerd Nöster	Austria	22.0	
6	5	Panagiotis Nikolaidis	Greece	22.1	
7	5	Luis Torres	Cuba	22.2	
1	6	Boris Zubov	Soviet Union	21.3	Q
2	6	Helmut Lang	West Germany	21.5	Q
3	6	László Mihályfi	Hungary	21.6	Q
4	6	José Luis Sánchez Paraíso	Spain	21.6	Q
5	6	Herman van Coppenolle	Belgium	21.8	
6	6	Stefan Penchev	Bulgaria	22.0	
7	6	Marcio Dornelles	Brazil	22.4	

=== Semifinals ===
Held on 28 August

Wind:
Heat 2: 0.0 m/s

Rank	Heat	Athlete	Nationality	Time	Notes
1	1	George Anderson	United States	21.1	Q
2	1	Edward Romanowski	Poland	21.2	Q
3	1	Ito Giani	Italy	21.4	0.0
4	1	Jenaro Talens	Spain	21.9	
5	1	Ivica Karasi	Yugoslavia	22.0	
	1	Harry Jerome	Canada	DNS	
1	2	Livio Berruti	Italy	21.1	Q
2	2	Alain Roy	France	21.4	Q
3	2	Helmut Lang	West Germany	21.5	
4	2	Fred van Herpen	Netherlands	21.6	
5	2	Alan Brereton	Canada	22.6	
	2	Toru Honda	Japan	?	
1	3	Menzies Campbell	Great Britain	21.1	Q
2	3	László Mihályfi	Hungary	21.2	Q
3	3	Boris Zubov	Soviet Union	21.2	
4	3	Pierre Burrelier	France	21.7	
5	3	Heinz-Uwe Bordtheiser	West Germany	21.9	
6	3	Rudolf Oegerli	Switzerland	22.1	
1	4	Edvin Ozolin	Soviet Union	21.3	Q
2	4	Wiesław Maniak	Poland	21.4	Q
3	4	José Luis Sánchez Paraíso	Spain	21.8	
4	4	Manuel Montalvo	Cuba	21.8	
5	4	Ignace Van der Cam	Belgium	22.0	
6	4	Viktor Eichler	Czechoslovakia	22.1	

=== Final ===
Held on 28 August

Wind: +2.5 m/s

Rank	Name	Nationality	Time	Notes
1st place, gold medalist(s)	Edvin Ozolin	Soviet Union	21.0	
2nd place, silver medalist(s)	George Anderson	United States	21.0	
3rd place, bronze medalist(s)	Menzies Campbell	Great Britain	21.2	
4	Edward Romanowski	Poland	21.3	
5	László Mihályfi	Hungary	21.3	
6	Livio Berruti	Italy	21.3	
7	Wiesław Maniak	Poland	21.4	
8	Alain Roy	France	21.7	
