= Athletics at the 1967 Summer Universiade – Men's 100 metres =

The men's 100 metres event at the 1967 Summer Universiade was held at the National Olympic Stadium in Tokyo on 30 and 31 August 1967.

== Medalists ==
Gold	Silver	Bronze
Gaoussou Koné; Ivory Coast	Tommie Smith; United States	Ippolito Giani; Italy

== Results ==
=== Heats ===
Rank	Heat	Athlete	Nationality	Time	Notes
1	1	Tommie Smith	United States	10.5	Q
2	1	Admilson Chitarra	Brazil	10.8	Q
3	1	Philippe Clerc	Switzerland	10.9	Q
4	1	Herman Van Coppenolle	Belgium	11.0	Q
5	1	Leo de Winter	Netherlands	11.0	
6	1	Francisco Trinos	Philippines	11.5	
1	2	Gert Metz	West Germany	10.5	Q
2	2	Ippolito Giani	Italy	10.6	Q
3	2	Phil King	Australia	10.7	Q
4	2	Alain Vermuse	France	10.7	Q
5	2	Jurandir Ienne	Brazil	11.0	
6	2	Yu Ken Sum	Hong Kong	11.6	
1	3	Gaoussou Koné	Ivory Coast	10.5	Q
2	3	Patrick Bourbeillon	France	10.6	Q
3	3	Greg Lewis	Australia	10.6	Q
4	3	Naoki Abe	Japan	10.7	Q
5	3	Bob Frith	Great Britain	10.7	
6	3	Supardi Soepardi	Indonesia	11.0	
1	4	Menzies Campbell	Great Britain	10.5	Q
2	4	Junji Ishikawa	Japan	10.6	Q
3	4	Ennio Preatoni	Italy	10.7	Q
4	4	Hans-Jürgen Felsen	West Germany	10.7	Q
5	4	Agus Sugiri	Indonesia	10.9	
6	4	Luís Silva	Portugal	11.1	

=== Semifinals ===
Rank	Heat	Athlete	Nationality	Time	Notes
1	1	Tommie Smith	United States	10.4	Q
2	1	Menzies Campbell	Great Britain	10.6	Q
3	1	Patrick Bourbeillon	France	10.6	Q
4	1	Ippolito Giani	Italy	10.6	Q
5	1	Phil King	Australia	10.6	
6	1	Naoki Abe	Japan	10.7	
7	1	Hans-Jürgen Felsen	West Germany	10.7	
8	1	Philippe Clerc	Switzerland	11.3	
1	2	Gaoussou Koné	Ivory Coast	10.4	Q
2	2	Greg Lewis	Australia	10.5	Q
3	2	Ennio Preatoni	Italy	10.5	Q
4	2	Junji Ishikawa	Japan	10.5	Q
5	2	Gert Metz	West Germany	10.5	
6	2	Admilson Chitarra	Brazil	10.7	
7	2	Herman Van Coppenolle	Belgium	10.7	
8	2	Alain Vermuse	France	10.8	

=== Final ===
Wind: -0.4 m/s

Rank	Name	Nationality	Time	Notes
1st place, gold medalist(s)	Gaoussou Koné	Ivory Coast	10.4	
2nd place, silver medalist(s)	Tommie Smith	United States	10.5	
3rd place, bronze medalist(s)	Ippolito Giani	Italy	10.7	
4	Greg Lewis	Australia	10.7	
5	Ennio Preatoni	Italy	10.7	
6	Menzies Campbell	Great Britain	10.8	
7	Junji Ishikawa	Japan	10.8	
8	Patrick Bourbeillon	France	10.8	
