= 1966 European Athletics Championships – Men's 200 metres =

Men's 200 metres at the 1966 European Athletics Championships
- Venue: Népstadion
- Location: Budapest
- Dates: 1 September (heats & semi-finals); 2 September (final)
- Competitors: 30 from 17 nations
- Winning time: 20.53

Medalists
gold medal	Roger Bambuck	France
silver medal	Marian Dudziak	Poland
bronze medal	Jean-Claude Nallet	France

The men's 200 metres at the 1966 European Athletics Championships was held in Budapest, Hungary, at Népstadion on 1 and 2 September 1966.

== Participation ==
According to an unofficial count, 30 athletes from 17 countries participated in the event.

- Albania (1)
- Belgium (1)
- Czechoslovakia (2)
- East Germany (2)
- France (3)
- Great Britain (2)
- Greece (1)
- Hungary (2)
- Italy (3)
- Netherlands (1)
- Poland (3)
- Romania (1)
- Soviet Union (2)
- Spain (1)
- Sweden (1)
- Turkey (1)
- West Germany (3)

== Results ==
=== Heats ===
1 September

==== Heat 1 ====
Rank	Name	Nationality	Time	Notes
1	Sergio Ottolina	Italy	21.3	Q
2	Ladislav Kříž	Czechoslovakia	21.5	Q
3	Josef Schwarz	West Germany	21.6	Q
4	Pierre Burrelier	France	21.6	
5	Mel Cheskin	Great Britain	21.8	
			Wind: -1.2 m/s	

==== Heat 2 ====
Rank	Name	Nationality	Time	Notes
1	Livio Berruti	Italy	21.2	Q
2	Marian Dudziak	Poland	21.2	Q
3	Fritz Roderfeld	West Germany	21.4	Q
4	Haris Aivaliotis	Greece	21.6	
5	José Luis Sánchez Paraíso	Spain	21.6	
			Wind: -0.3 m/s	

==== Heat 3 ====
Rank	Name	Nationality	Time	Notes
1	Jean-Claude Nallet	France	21.1	Q
2	Amin Tuyakov	Soviet Union	21.4	Q
3	Ennio Preatoni	Italy	21.4	Q
4	Menzies Campbell	Great Britain	21.4	
5	Manfred Knickenberg	West Germany	21.4	
6	Edward Romanowski	Poland	21.5	
7	Jacques Vanhee	Belgium	21.8	
			Wind: 0.0 m/s	

==== Heat 4 ====
Rank	Name	Nationality	Time	Notes
1	Roger Bambuck	France	21.1	Q
2	Gheorghe Zamfirescu	Romania	21.2	Q
3	Heinz Erbstösser	East Germany	21.3	Q
4	István Gyulai	Hungary	21.3	Q
5	Jiří Kynos	Czechoslovakia	21.6	
6	Sonar Coşan	Turkey	22.3	
			Wind: +0.6 m/s	

==== Heat 5 ====
Rank	Name	Nationality	Time	Notes
1	Leo de Winter	Netherlands	21.0	Q
2	Jan Werner	Poland	21.1	Q
3	József Istóczky	Hungary	21.2	Q
4	Harald Eggers	East Germany	21.6	
5	Bo Althoff	Sweden	21.6	
6	Nikolay Politiko	Soviet Union	21.7	
7	Rasim Kraja	Albania	22.3	
			Wind: +2.0 m/s	

=== Semi-finals ===
1 September

==== Heat 1 ====
Rank	Name	Nationality	Time	Notes
1	Marian Dudziak	Poland	20.90	Q
2	Roger Bambuck	France	21.25	Q
3	Livio Berruti	Italy	21.29	Q
4	Ennio Preatoni	Italy	21.32	Q
5	Heinz Erbstösser	East Germany	21.33	
6	Leo de Winter	Netherlands	21.33	
7	István Gyulai	Hungary	21.58	
8	Josef Schwarz	West Germany	21.64	
			Wind: +0.9 m/s	

==== Heat 2 ====
Rank	Name	Nationality	Time	Notes
1	Jean-Claude Nallet	France	20.9	Q
2	Jan Werner	Poland	21.0	Q
3	Fritz Roderfeld	West Germany	21.2	Q
4	Ladislav Kříž	Czechoslovakia	21.2	Q
5	Amin Tuyakov	Soviet Union	21.2	
6	József Istóczky	Hungary	21.2	
7	Gheorghe Zamfirescu	Romania	21.3	
8	Sergio Ottolina	Italy	21.5	
			Wind: +0.9 m/s	

=== Final ===
2 September

Rank	Name	Nationality	Time	Notes
1st place, gold medalist(s)	Roger Bambuck	France	20.93	
2nd place, silver medalist(s)	Marian Dudziak	Poland	21.0	
3rd place, bronze medalist(s)	Jean-Claude Nallet	France	21.0	
4	Jan Werner	Poland	21.1	
5	Ladislav Kříž	Czechoslovakia	21.3	
6	Fritz Roderfeld	West Germany	21.4	
7	Livio Berruti	Italy	21.5	
8	Ennio Preatoni	Italy	21.7	
			Wind: 0.0 m/s	
