= Athletics at the 1963 Summer Universiade – Men's 4 × 100 metres relay =

The men's 4 × 100 metres relay event at the 1963 Summer Universiade was held at the Estádio Olímpico Monumental in Porto Alegre in September 1963.

== Results ==
=== Heats ===
Rank	Heat	Nation	Athletes	Time	Notes
1	1	Hungary	Csaba Csutorás, László Mihályfi, István Gyulai, Gyula Rábai	41.1	Q
2	1	Soviet Union	Anatoliy Mikhaylov, Igor Ter-Ovanesyan, Edvins Ozolins, Aleksandr Zolotaryev	41.1	Q
3	1	France	Gérard Zingg, Jean-Pierre Fabre, Alain Roy, Alain Moreaux	41.9	Q
	1	Brazil	Antônio Alves, Murilo Muradas, Carlos Luis Mossa, Marco Brausio Bolzan	DNF	
1	2	Japan	Hirotada Hayase, Hideo Iijima, Toru Honda, Katushiro Miyake	41.0	Q
2	2	Cuba	Alejandro Pasqual, Manuel Montalvo, Lázaro Betancourt, Enrique Figuerola	41.4	Q
3	2	West Germany	Hans-Joachim Reske, Jürgen Schüttler, Heinz-Uwe Bordtheiser, Hans-Jürgen Felsen	41.5	Q
4	2	Great Britain	George Cmela, Dick Steane, Jim Barry, Adrian Metcalfe	41.7	
5	2	Peru	Javier Sanguinetti, José Cavero, Julián Navarro, Roberto Alvarado	42.7	

=== Final ===
Rank	Nation	Athletes	Time	Notes
1st place, gold medalist(s)	Hungary	Csaba Csutorás, László Mihályfi, István Gyulai, Gyula Rábai	40.98	
2nd place, silver medalist(s)	Cuba	Alejandro Pasqual, Manuel Montalvo, Lázaro Betancourt, Enrique Figuerola	41.37	
3rd place, bronze medalist(s)	France	Gérard Zingg, Jean-Pierre Fabre, Alain Roy, Alain Moreaux	41.82	
4	Japan	Hirotada Hayase, Hideo Iijima, Toru Honda, Katushiro Miyake	42.35	
	Soviet Union	Anatoliy Mikhaylov, Igor Ter-Ovanesyan, Edvins Ozolins, Aleksandr Zolotaryev	DQ	
	West Germany	Hans-Joachim Reske, Jürgen Schüttler, Heinz-Uwe Bordtheiser, Hans-Jürgen Felsen	DQ	
