= Athletics at the 1963 Summer Universiade – Men's 200 metres =

The men's 200 metres event at the 1963 Summer Universiade was held at the Estádio Olímpico Monumental in Porto Alegre in September 1963.

== Medalists ==
Gold	Silver	Bronze
Edvins Ozolins; Soviet Union	Dick Steane; Great Britain	Livio Berruti; Italy

== Results ==
=== Heats ===
Rank	Heat	Name	Nationality	Time	Notes
1	1	Dick Steane	Great Britain	21.77	Q
2	1	Alain Roy	France	21.82	Q
3	1	Jacques Pennewaert	Belgium	21.93	Q
4	1	Toru Honda	Japan	22.04	
1	2	Edvins Ozolins	Soviet Union	21.82	Q
2	2	Jean-Pierre Fabre	France	22.3	Q
3	2	Alejandro Pascual	Cuba	22.5	Q
4	2	Shlomo Nitzani	Israel	22.6	
1	3	Manuel Montalvo	Cuba	21.93	Q
2	3	Jim Barry	Great Britain	22.0	Q
3	3	László Mihályfi	Hungary	22.1	Q
4	3	Heinz-Uwe Bordtheiser	West Germany	22.1	
5	3	Jorge Soares	Portugal	22.1	
1	4	Livio Berruti	Italy	22.04	Q
2	4	Csaba Csutorás	Hungary	22.0	Q
3	4	Hans-Jürgen Felsen	West Germany	22.4	Q
4	4	José Luis Sánchez	Spain	22.4	
5	4	Antônio Alves	Brazil	23.1	
6	4	Julián Navarro	Peru	23.2	

=== Semifinals ===
Rank	Heat	Name	Nationality	Time	Notes
1	1	Livio Berruti	Italy	21.9	Q
2	1	Csaba Csutorás	Hungary	22.2	Q
3	1	László Mihályfi	Hungary	22.3	Q
4	1	Manuel Montalvo	Cuba	22.6	
5	1	Alain Roy	France	22.6	
6	1	Jim Barry	Great Britain	22.7	
1	2	Edvins Ozolins	Soviet Union	22.1	Q
2	2	Dick Steane	Great Britain	22.2	Q
3	2	Jean-Pierre Fabre	France	22.5	Q
4	2	Jacques Pennewaert	Belgium	22.6	
5	2	Hans-Jürgen Felsen	West Germany	22.8	
6	2	Alejandro Pascual	Cuba	22.8	

=== Final ===
Rank	Athlete	Nationality	Time	Notes
1st place, gold medalist(s)	Edvins Ozolins	Soviet Union	21.44	
2nd place, silver medalist(s)	Dick Steane	Great Britain	21.55	
3rd place, bronze medalist(s)	Livio Berruti	Italy	21.60	
4	László Mihályfi	Hungary	21.90	
5	Csaba Csutorás	Hungary	21.92	
6	Jean-Pierre Fabre	France	22.2	
