= 1968 European Indoor Games – Men's 50 metres =

The men's 50 metres event at the 1968 European Indoor Games was held on 9 March in Madrid.

== Medalists ==
Gold	Silver	Bronze
Jobst Hirscht; West Germany	Bob Frith; Great Britain	Günther Gollos; East Germany

== Results ==
=== Heats ===
First 4 from each heat (Q) qualified directly for the semifinals.

Rank	Heat	Name	Nationality	Time	Notes
1	2	Jobst Hirscht	West Germany	5.78	Q, WB
2	3	Vladislav Sapeya	Soviet Union	5.79	Q
3	1	Fyodor Pankratov	Soviet Union	5.80	Q
4	2	Bob Frith	Great Britain	5.81	Q
5	1	Günther Gollos	East Germany	5.83	Q
5	3	Wiesław Maniak	Poland	5.83	Q
7	3	Gerhard Wucherer	West Germany	5.84	Q
8	1	Pasquale Giannattasio	Italy	5.87	Q
9	1	Ivica Karasi	Yugoslavia	5.88	Q
9	3	José Luis Sánchez	Spain	5.88	Q
11	2	Marian Dudziak	Poland	5.90	Q
12	1	Ladislav Kříž	Czechoslovakia	5.91	
13	2	Petr Utekal	Czechoslovakia	5.92	Q
14	2	Ippolito Giani	Italy	5.94	
15	1	Antonio Silva	Portugal	5.96	
16	3	Haris Aivaliotis	Greece	6.07	

=== Semifinals ===
First 3 from each heat (Q) qualified directly for the final.

Rank	Heat	Name	Nationality	Time	Notes
1	2	Jobst Hirscht	West Germany	5.70	Q, WB
2	1	Bob Frith	Great Britain	5.76	Q
3	1	Günther Gollos	East Germany	5.78	Q
4	1	Wiesław Maniak	Poland	5.79	Q
5	1	Fyodor Pankratov	Soviet Union	5.79	
6	2	Vladislav Sapeya	Soviet Union	5.80	Q
7	1	José Luis Sánchez	Spain	5.83	
8	2	Ivica Karasi	Yugoslavia	5.84	Q
9	2	Pasquale Giannattasio	Italy	5.84	
10	2	Marian Dudziak	Poland	5.86	
11	1	Gerhard Wucherer	West Germany	5.90	
12	2	Petr Utekal	Czechoslovakia	5.91	

=== Final ===
Rank	Lane	Name	Nationality	Time	Notes
1st place, gold medalist(s)	3	Jobst Hirscht	West Germany	5.72	
2nd place, silver medalist(s)	1	Bob Frith	Great Britain	5.78	
3rd place, bronze medalist(s)	5	Günther Gollos	East Germany	5.78	
4	2	Wiesław Maniak	Poland	5.79	
5	6	Ivica Karasi	Yugoslavia	5.79	
6	4	Vladislav Sapeya	Soviet Union	5.80	
