= Edward Romanowski =

Polish sprinter (1944–2007)

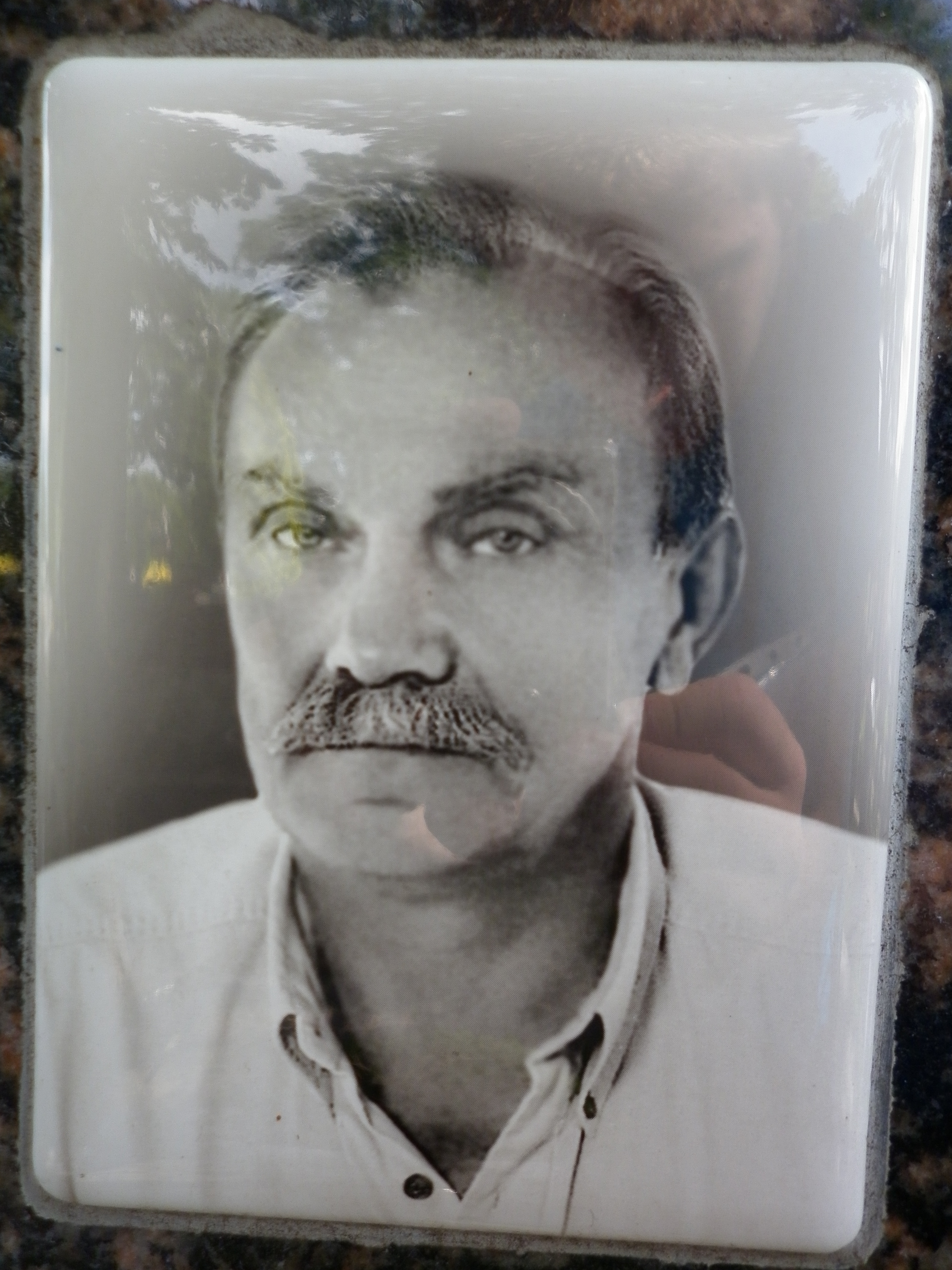

Personal information
- Born: 30 July 1944 Warsaw, Poland
- Died: 11 November 2007 (aged 63) Warsaw, Poland
- Height: 1.85 m (6 ft 1 in)
- Weight: 80 kg (176 lb)

Sport
- Sport: Track and field
- Club: Legia Warsaw
Medal record
Representing Poland
European Indoor Championships
Silver medal – second place	1967 Prague	4 × 300 m relay
Silver medal – second place	1969 Belgrade	Medley relay

Edward Romanowski (30 July 1944 – 11 November 2007) was a Polish sprinter who specialized in the 200 metres.

He was born in Warsaw and represented the club Legia Warszawa. At the 1967 European Indoor Games he won a silver medal in the 4 × 300 metres relay, which he ran together with Tadeusz Jaworski, Jan Balachowski and Edmund Borowski. At the 1968 Olympic Games he reached heat two of the 200 metres. In the 4 × 100 metres relay he finished eighth in the final together with Wiesław Maniak, Zenon Nowosz and Marian Dudziak. At the 1969 European Indoor Games he won a gold medal in the relay, where Poland was the only competing team. The teammates were Andrzej Badeński, Henryk Szordykowski and Jan Radomski.

He became Polish 200 metres champion in 1968.

He was buried at the Służew Old Cemetery in Warsaw.

== International competitions ==
Year	Competition	Venue	Position	Event	Notes
Representing Poland
1965	Universiade	Budapest, Hungary	11th (sf)	100 m	10.6
1965	Universiade	Budapest, Hungary	4th	200 m	21.3
1965	Universiade	Budapest, Hungary	5th	4 × 100 m relay	41.0
1965	European Cup Final	Stuttgart, West Germany	2nd	4 × 100 m relay	39.5
1966	European Championships	Budapest, Hungary	17th (h)	200 m	21.5
1967	European Indoor Games	Prague, Czechoslovakia	2nd	4 × 300 m relay	2:20.2
1967	European Cup Final	Kiev, Soviet Union	5th	4 × 100 m relay	40.4
1968	Olympic Games	Mexico City, Mexico	10th (sf)	200 m	20.80
1968	Olympic Games	Mexico City, Mexico	8th	4 × 100 m relay	39.2
1969	European Indoor Games	Belgrade, Yugoslavia	1st	Medley relay	4:16.4
1969	European Championships	Athens, Greece	4th	4 × 100 m relay	39.55
1970	European Cup Final	Stockholm, Sweden	2nd	4 × 100 m relay	39.5

== Personal bests ==
Outdoor

- 100 metres – 10.3h (Jena 1964)
- 200 metres – 20.80 A (Mexico City 1968)
