= 1967 European Indoor Games – Men's 4 × 300 metres relay =

The men's 4 × 300 metres relay event at the 1967 European Indoor Games was held on 11 and 12 March in Prague. Each athlete ran two laps of the 150 metres track.

== Results ==
=== Heats ===
First 2 teams in each heat (Q) qualified directly for the final.

Rank	Heat	Nation	Competitors	Time	Notes
1	1	East Germany	Hermann Burde; Hartmut Koch; Hartmut Schwabe; Wolfgang Müller	2:19.3	Q
2	1	Czechoslovakia	Jaromír Haisl; Josef Hegyes; František Ortman; Josef Trousil	2:20.2	Q
3	1	Spain	Ramón Magariños; Álvaro González; Alfonso Gabernet; Rogelio Rivas	2:21.5	
4	1	Hungary	István Bátori; László Mihályfi; Gyula Rábai; István Gyulai	2:22.4	
1	2	Soviet Union	Nikolay Shkarnikov; Vasyl Anisimov; Nikolay Ivanov; Borys Savchuk	2:20.5	Q
2	2	Poland	Edward Romanowski; Jan Balachowski; Edmund Borowski; Tadeusz Jaworski	2:20.5	Q
3	2	Italy	Ippolito Giani; Roberto Frinolli; Bruno Bianchi; Sergio Bello	2:20.8	

=== Final ===
Rank	Nation	Competitors	Time	Notes
1st place, gold medalist(s)	Soviet Union	Nikolay Ivanov; Vasyl Anisimov; Aleksandr Bratchikov; Borys Savchuk	2:18.0	
2nd place, silver medalist(s)	Poland	Edward Romanowski; Jan Balachowski; Edmund Borowski; Tadeusz Jaworski	2:20.2	
3rd place, bronze medalist(s)	Czechoslovakia	Jaromír Haisl; Josef Hegyes; František Ortman; Josef Trousil	2:20.5	
	East Germany	Hermann Burde; Hartmut Koch; Hartmut Schwabe; Wolfgang Müller	DQ	
