= Athletics at the 1964 Summer Olympics =

Coordinates: 35.6781°N 139.7147°E

Athletics at the Games of the XVIII Olympiad
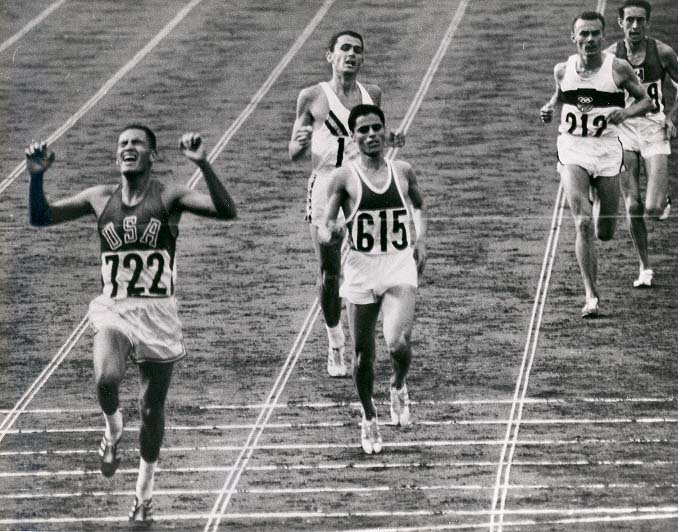
- Billy Mills winning the 10,000 metres
- No. of events: 36
- Competitors: 1,016 from 82 nations

At the 1964 Summer Olympics in Tokyo, the athletics competition included 36 events, 24 for men and 12 for women. The women's 400 metres and women's pentathlon events were introduced at these Games. A total of 1016 athletes from 82 countries participated, and these were the last Olympics to use a cinder track.

== Medal summary ==
=== Men ===
Event	Gold		Silver		Bronze	
100 metres	Bob Hayes; United States	10.0 (=WR)	Enrique Figuerola; Cuba	10.2	Harry Jerome; Canada	10.2
200 metres	Henry Carr; United States	20.3 (OR)	Paul Drayton; United States	20.5	Edwin Roberts; Trinidad and Tobago	20.6
400 metres	Mike Larrabee; United States	45.1	Wendell Mottley; Trinidad and Tobago	45.2	Andrzej Badeński; Poland	45.6
800 metres	Peter Snell; New Zealand	1:45.1 (OR)	Bill Crothers; Canada	1:45.6	Wilson Kiprugut; Kenya	1:45.9
1500 metres	Peter Snell; New Zealand	3:38.1	Josef Odložil; Czechoslovakia	3:39.6	John Davies; New Zealand	3:39.6
5000 metres	Bob Schul; United States	13:48.8	Harald Norpoth; United Team of Germany	13:49.6	Bill Dellinger; United States	13:49.8
10,000 metres	Billy Mills; United States	28:24.4 (OR)	Mohammed Gammoudi; Tunisia	28:24.8	Ron Clarke; Australia	28:25.8
110 metres hurdles	Hayes Jones; United States	13.67	Blaine Lindgren; United States	13.74	Anatoly Mikhaylov; Soviet Union	13.78
400 metres hurdles	Rex Cawley; United States	49.6	John Cooper; Great Britain	50.1	Salvatore Morale; Italy	50.1
3000 metres steeplechase	Gaston Roelants; Belgium	8:30.8 (OR)	Maurice Herriott; Great Britain	8:32.4	Ivan Belyayev; Soviet Union	8:33.8
4 × 100 metres relay	United States; Paul Drayton; Gerry Ashworth; Richard Stebbins; Bob Hayes	39.0 (WR)	Poland; Andrzej Zieliński; Wiesław Maniak; Marian Foik; Marian Dudziak	39.3	France; Paul Genevay; Bernard Laidebeur; Claude Piquemal; Jocelyn Delecour	39.3
4 × 400 metres relay	United States; Ollan Cassell; Mike Larrabee; Ulis Williams; Henry Carr	3:00.7 (WR)	Great Britain; Tim Graham; Adrian Metcalfe; John Cooper; Robbie Brightwell	3:01.6	Trinidad and Tobago; Edwin Skinner; Kent Bernard; Edwin Roberts; Wendell Mottley	3:01.7
Marathon	Abebe Bikila; Ethiopia	2:12:11.2 (WR)	Basil Heatley; Great Britain	2:16:19.2	Kōkichi Tsuburaya; Japan	2:16:22.8
20 kilometres walk	Ken Matthews; Great Britain	1:29:34.0 (OR)	Dieter Lindner; United Team of Germany	1:31:13.2	Volodymyr Holubnychy; Soviet Union	1:31:59.4
50 kilometres walk	Abdon Pamich; Italy	4:11:12.4 (OR)	Paul Nihill; Great Britain	4:11:31.2	Ingvar Pettersson; Sweden	4:14:17.4
High jump	Valeriy Brumel; Soviet Union	2.18 m (OR)	John Thomas; United States	2.18 m (OR)	John Rambo; United States	2.16 m
Pole vault	Fred Hansen; United States	5.10 m (OR)	Wolfgang Reinhardt; United Team of Germany	5.05 m	Klaus Lehnertz; United Team of Germany	5.00 m
Long jump	Lynn Davies; Great Britain	8.07 m	Ralph Boston; United States	8.03 m	Igor Ter-Ovanesyan; Soviet Union	7.99 m
Triple jump	Józef Szmidt; Poland	16.85 m (OR)	Oleg Fedoseyev; Soviet Union	16.58 m	Viktor Kravchenko; Soviet Union	16.57 m
Shot put	Dallas Long; United States	20.33 m (OR)	Randy Matson; United States	20.20 m	Vilmos Varjú; Hungary	19.39 m
Discus throw	Al Oerter; United States	61.00 m (OR)	Ludvík Daněk; Czechoslovakia	60.52 m	Dave Weill; United States	59.49 m
Hammer throw	Romuald Klim; Soviet Union	69.74 m (OR)	Gyula Zsivótzky; Hungary	69.09 m	Uwe Beyer; United Team of Germany	68.09 m
Javelin throw	Pauli Nevala; Finland	82.66 m	Gergely Kulcsár; Hungary	82.32 m	Jānis Lūsis; Soviet Union	80.57 m
Decathlon	Willi Holdorf; United Team of Germany	7887	Rein Aun; Soviet Union	7842	Hans-Joachim Walde; United Team of Germany	7809

=== Women ===
Event	Gold		Silver		Bronze	
100 metres	Wyomia Tyus; United States	11.4	Edith McGuire; United States	11.6	Ewa Kłobukowska; Poland	11.6
200 metres	Edith McGuire; United States	23.0 (OR)	Irena Kirszenstein; Poland	23.1	Marilyn Black; Australia	23.1
400 metres	Betty Cuthbert; Australia	52.0 (OR)	Ann Packer; Great Britain	52.2	Judy Amoore; Australia	53.4
800 metres	Ann Packer; Great Britain	2:01.1 (WR)	Maryvonne Dupureur; France	2:01.9	Marise Chamberlain; New Zealand	2:02.8
80 metres hurdles	Karin Balzer; United Team of Germany	10.5	Teresa Ciepły; Poland	10.5	Pam Kilborn; Australia	10.6
4 × 100 metres relay	Poland; Teresa Ciepły; Irena Kirszenstein; Halina Górecka; Ewa Kłobukowska	43.6 (WR)	United States; Willye White; Wyomia Tyus; Marilyn White; Edith McGuire	43.9	Great Britain; Janet Simpson; Mary Rand; Daphne Arden; Dorothy Hyman	44.0
High jump	Iolanda Balaș; Romania	1.90 m (OR)	Michele Brown; Australia	1.80 m	Taisia Chenchik; Soviet Union	1.78 m
Long jump	Mary Rand; Great Britain	6.76 m (WR)	Irena Kirszenstein; Poland	6.60 m	Tatyana Shchelkanova; Soviet Union	6.42 m
Shot put	Tamara Press; Soviet Union	18.14 m (OR)	Renate Garisch-Culmberger; United Team of Germany	17.61 m	Galina Zybina; Soviet Union	17.45 m
Discus throw	Tamara Press; Soviet Union	57.27 m (OR)	Ingrid Lotz; United Team of Germany	57.21 m	Lia Manoliu; Romania	56.97 m
Javelin throw	Mihaela Peneș; Romania	60.54 m	Márta Rudas; Hungary	58.27 m	Yelena Gorchakova; Soviet Union	57.06 m
Pentathlon	Irina Press; Soviet Union	5246 (WR)	Mary Rand; Great Britain	5035	Galina Bystrova; Soviet Union	4956

== Medal table ==
Rank	Nation	Gold	Silver	Bronze	Total
1	United States	14	7	3	24
2	Soviet Union	5	2	11	18
3	Great Britain	4	7	1	12
4	United Team of Germany	2	5	3	10
5	Poland	2	4	2	8
6	New Zealand	2	0	2	4
7	Romania	2	0	1	3
8	Australia	1	1	4	6
9	Italy	1	0	1	2
10	Belgium	1	0	0	1
10	Ethiopia	1	0	0	1
10	Finland	1	0	0	1
13	Hungary	0	3	1	4
14	Czechoslovakia	0	2	0	2
15	Trinidad and Tobago	0	1	2	3
16	Canada	0	1	1	2
16	France	0	1	1	2
18	Cuba	0	1	0	1
18	Tunisia	0	1	0	1
20	Japan	0	0	1	1
20	Kenya	0	0	1	1
20	Sweden	0	0	1	1
Totals (22 entries)		36	36	36	108
