= Zenon Begier =

Polish discus thrower (1935–2019)

Personal information
- Nickname: Giant
- Nationality: Polish
- Born: 23 November 1935 Oborniki, Poland
- Died: 27 July 2019 (aged 83) Bydgoszcz, Poland
- Height: 1.98 m (6 ft 6 in)
- Weight: 80 kg (176 lb)

Sport
- Sport: Athletics
- Event: Discus throw
- Club: Sparta Oborniki (–1956); Warta Poznań (1957–11961); Zawisza Bydgoszcz (1962–1970)

Zenon Begier (23 November 1935 – 27 July 2019) was a Polish athlete. He competed in the men's discus throw at the 1960 Summer Olympics and the 1964 Summer Olympics.

== International competitions ==
Year	Competition	Venue	Position	Event	Notes
Representing Poland
1960	Olympic Games	Rome, Italy	14th	Discus throw	53.18 m
1962	European Championships	Belgrade, Yugoslavia	15th	Discus throw	52.39 m
1964	Olympic Games	Tokyo, Japan	6th	Discus throw	57.06 m
1965	European Cup Final	Stuttgart, West Germany	1st	Discus throw	58.92 m
1966	European Championships	Budapest, Hungary	7th	Discus throw	55.94 m

== Personal bests ==
- Shot put – 16.10 (Warsaw 1964)
- Discus throw – 60.50 (Frankfurt (Oder) 1968)
