= Roger Bambuck =

French sprinter and politician

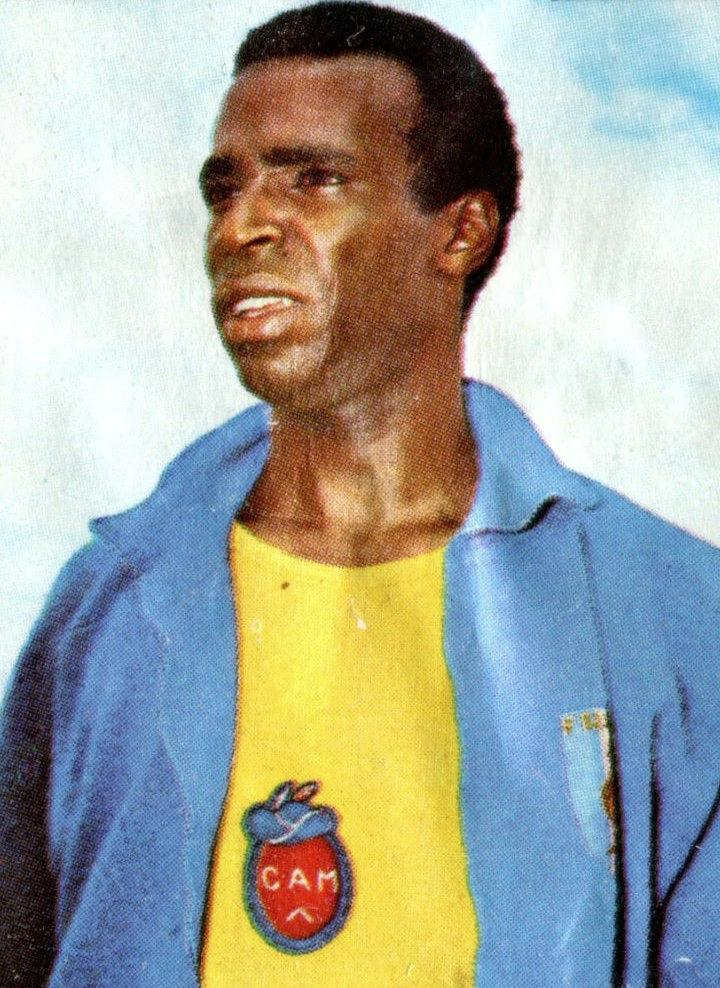
- Roger Bambuck

Medal record

Representing France

Men's athletics

Olympic Games
Bronze medal – third place	1968 Mexico City	4×100 m

European Championships
Gold medal – first place	1966 Budapest	200 m
Gold medal – first place	1966 Budapest	4×100 m
Silver medal – second place	1966 Budapest	100 m

Roger Bambuck (born 22 November 1945 in Pointe-a-Pitre, Guadeloupe) is a French former sprinter and politician.

== Athletic career ==
Bambuck took part in his first Olympic Games in Tokyo in 1964. At the 1966 European Championships in Budapest, he won the gold medal in the 200 m and in the 4 × 100 m relay, as well as the silver medal in the 100 m.

He competed in the 1968 Summer Olympics held in Mexico City in the 100 metres (finalist) and in the 4 × 100 metre relay where he won the bronze medal with his teammates Gérard Fenouil, Jocelyn Delecour and Claude Piquemal. In the 100 and 200 m. individual men's final he finished fifth with times of 10.16 and 20.51 seconds respectively. Earlier in 1968 he had equalled Armin Hary's eight-year-old European record of 10.0 seconds.

He retired from sprint after the Mexico games, aged 23.

== Political life ==
In the mid-eighties, he became head of sport for the commune of Épinay-sur-Seine. From 1988 to 1991, he was minister of Youth and Sports under Michel Rocard. He then held senior positions in the civil service.

He is an active freemason.

== Personal life ==
Bambuck set out to study medicine but dropped out. He then worked a time for the automobile manufacturer Renault, before his athletic career.

Bambuck has been married to former track and field athlete Ghislaine Barnay since 1974.

He had the honour of starting the 24-hour Le Mans race.

Records
Preceded by (Poland) Jan Werner	European Record Holder Men's 200m 30 July 1967 - 16 October 1968	Succeeded by (West Germany) Jochen Eigenherr
