= Bernard Laidebeur =

French sprinter

Personal information
- Born: 11 July 1942 Paris, France
- Died: 21 April 1991 (aged 48) Paris, France
Medal record
Men's Athletics
Representing France
Olympic Games
Bronze medal – third place	1964 Tokyo	4x100 metre relay

Bernard Laidebeur (11 July 1942 – 21 April 1991) was a French athlete, who mainly competed in the 100 metres. He was born and died in Paris.

He competed for France at the 1964 Summer Olympics held in Tokyo, Japan, where he won the bronze medal with his team mates Paul Genevay, Claude Piquemal and Jocelyn Delecour in the men's 4 x 100 metre relay.
