= Claude Piquemal =

French sprinter

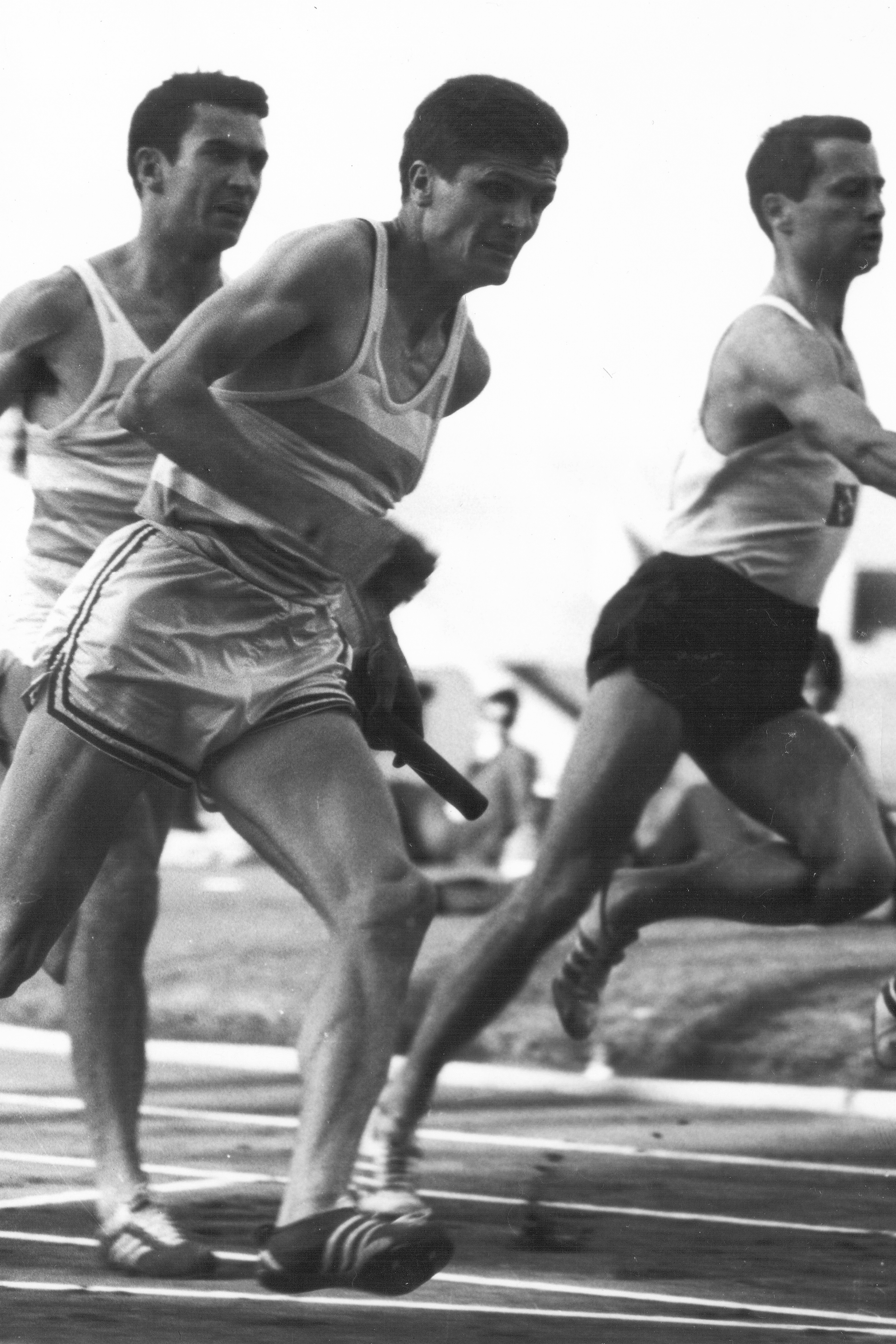
- Piquemal (left) with Jocelyn Delecour (middle)

Personal information
- Born: 13 March 1939 (age 87) Siguer, Ariège, France
- Height: 172 cm (5 ft 8 in)
- Weight: 65 kg (143 lb)

Sport
- Country: France
- Sport: Athletics
Medal record
Men's athletics
Representing France
Olympic Games
Bronze medal – third place	1964 Tokyo	4 × 100 m relay
Bronze medal – third place	1968 Mexico City	4 × 100 m relay
European Championships
Gold medal – first place	1962 Belgrade	100 m
Gold medal – first place	1966 Budapest	4 × 100 m relay
Bronze medal – third place	1966 Budapest	100 m
Mediterranean Games
Gold medal – first place	1963 Naples	100 m

Claude Piquemal (born 13 March 1939 in Siguer, Ariège) is a French athlete who mainly competed in the 100 metres.

He competed for France in the 4 × 100 metre relay at the 1964 Summer Olympics held in Tokyo, Japan, where he won the bronze medal with his teammates Paul Genevay, Bernard Laidebeur and Jocelyn Delecour.

Piquemal and Delecour combined again four years later in Mexico City, this time with Gérard Fenouil and Roger Bambuck where they won the bronze medal in the same event.
