= Patrick Morrison =

Australian maritime archaeologist

Patrick Morrison is an Australian maritime archaeologist at the Western Australian Museum. His work includes underwater photogrammetry, submerged cultural landscapes and historic shipwreck recording.

== Career ==
Morrison's doctoral research examined human responses to past climate shifts and sea-level rise in Murujuga, north-western Australia, with a focus on submerged landscapes archaeology and 3D photogrammetry for cultural heritage. He has coordinated the UWA unit ARCY3012: 500 Years of Historical, Maritime and Industrial Archaeology.

Morrison was a co-author of a 2020 paper in PLOS ONE that reported Australia's first confirmed ancient underwater archaeological sites on the continental shelf. The sites were located off the Murujuga coastline in north-western Australia.

Morrison has recorded historic wreck sites using 3D photogrammetry through work with the Maritime Archaeological Association of Western Australia and the Western Australian Museum, including Trial (1622), Batavia (1629) and Zeewijk (1727). In 2021, Morrison recorded the Trial wreck site during filming for the first season of the Disney+ documentary series Shipwreck Hunters Australia.

In 2023, Morrison, Jess Green and Ian McCann located a previously unrecorded wreck in the Swan River near Point Walter after analysing government-released 3D riverbed mapping data and conducting follow-up dives. In 2024, the wreck was identified as an 1882 limestone cargo barge and was described by ABC News and the Western Australian Museum as the earliest known shipwreck in the Swan River. In 2025, Morrison, Andrew Oakeley and David Jackson co-discovered the wreck of HNLMS K XI, a Dutch submarine lying off Wadjemup / Rottnest Island.
