= Gheorghe Zamfirescu =

Romanian water polo player

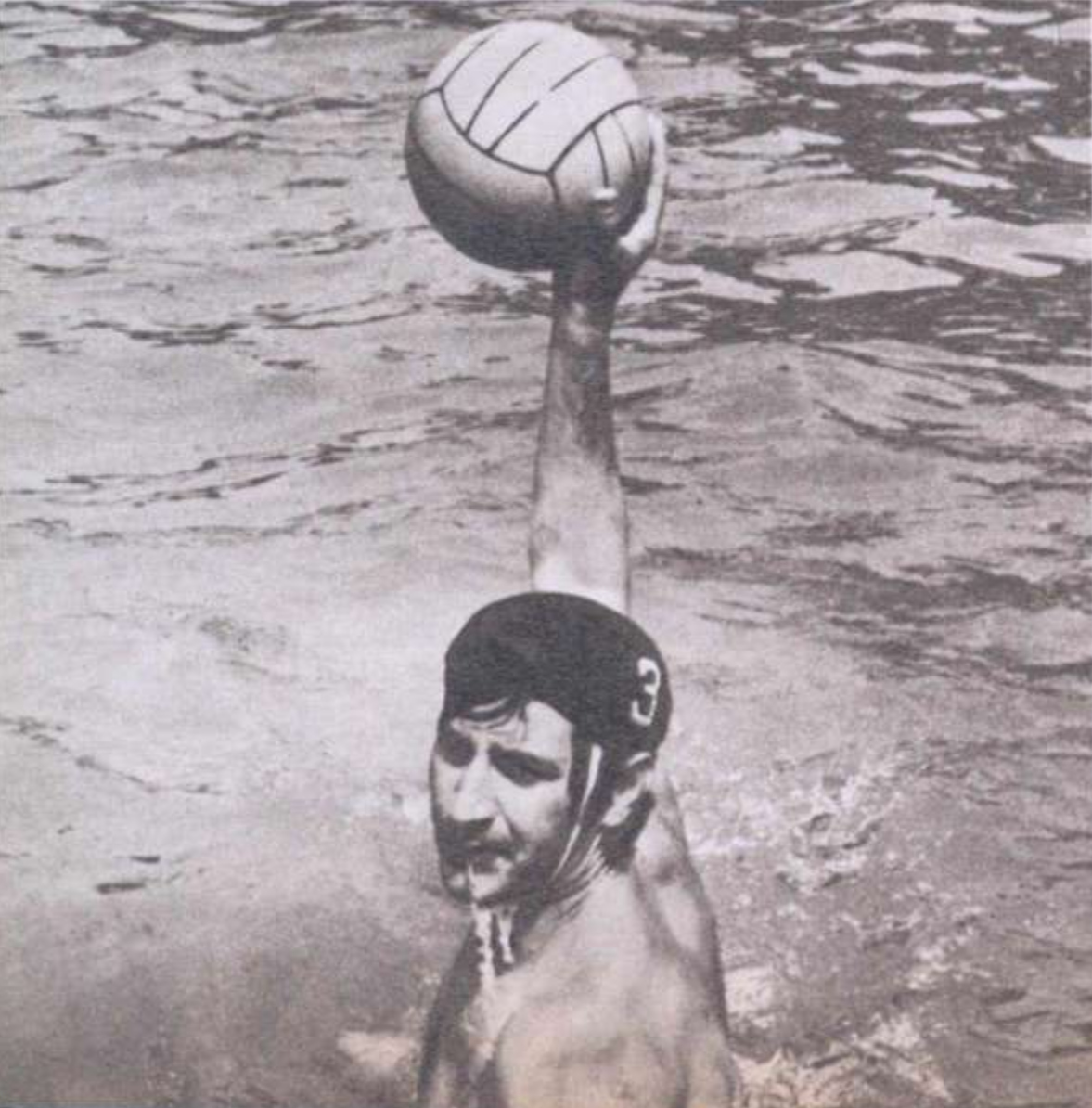
- Zamfirescu in 1972

Personal information
- Nationality: Romanian
- Born: 21 September 1946 (age 79) Bucharest, Romania

Sport
- Sport: Water polo

Gheorghe Zamfirescu (born 21 September 1946) is a Romanian water polo player. He competed at the 1972 Summer Olympics and the 1976 Summer Olympics.
