= Wiesław Maniak =

Polish sprinter (1938–1982)

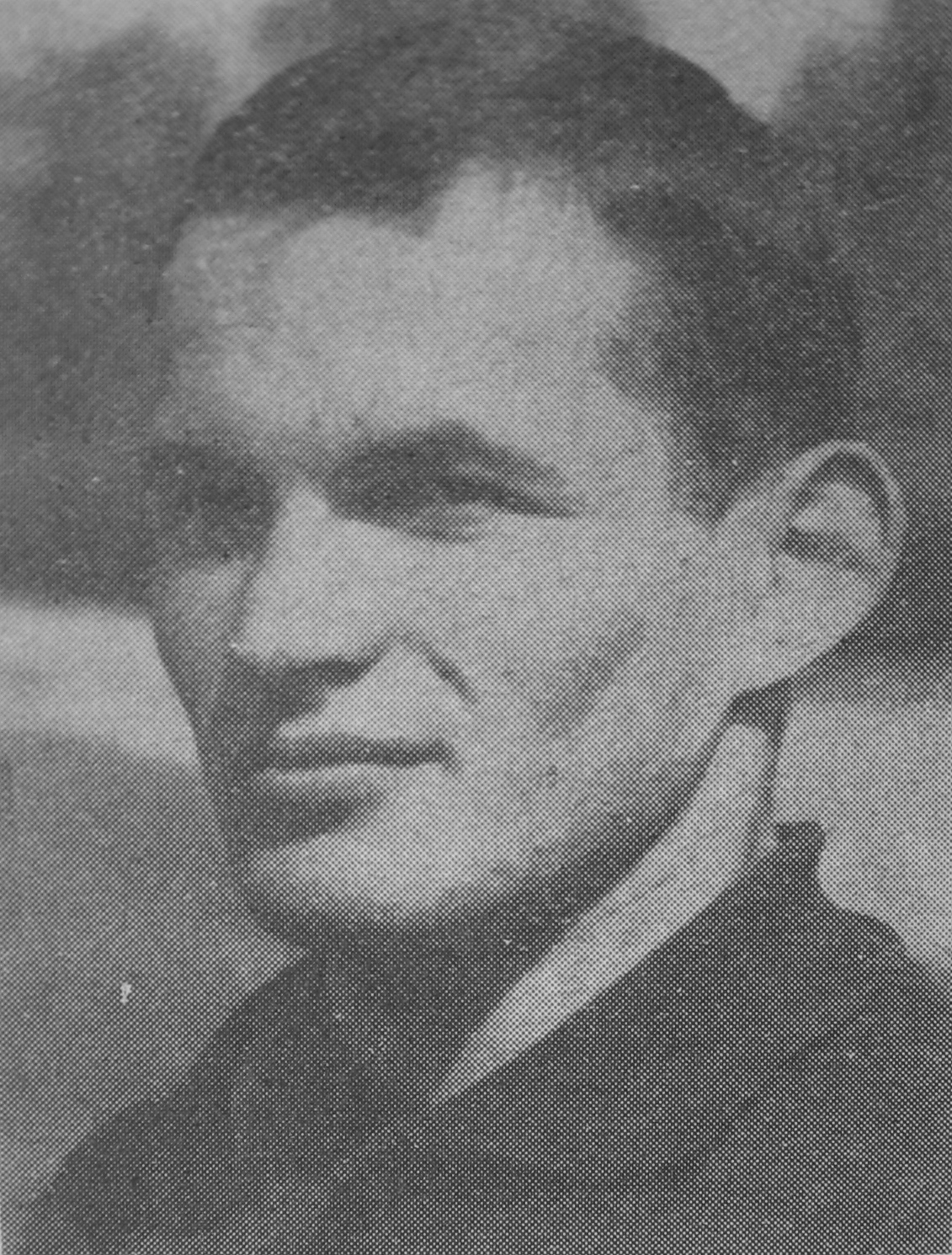

Personal information
- Nationality: Polish
- Born: 22 May 1938 Lwów, Poland (present-day Ukraine)
- Died: 28 May 1982 (aged 44) Kurchatov, Kursk, Soviet Union
- Height: 1.71 m (5 ft 7 in)
- Weight: 74 kg (163 lb)

Sport
- Sport: Athletics
- Event: Sprints
- Club: Pogoń Szczecin; Skra Warszawa
Medal record
Men's athletics
Representing Poland
Olympic Games
Silver medal – second place	1964 Tokyo	4×100 m
European Championships
Gold medal – first place	1966 Budapest	100 m

Wiesław Jan Maniak (22 May 1938 – 28 May 1982) was a Polish athlete who mainly competed in the 100 m sprint and participated in two Olympic Games.

== Biography ==
He spent his part of his youth between 1957 and 1963 in Great Britain and Ireland where his father lived after World War Two. Competing under the name of Victor Manning he became Irish champion in 1963 winning the 100 and 220 yards. Having come back to his home country the previous year, he competed for Poland at the 1964 Summer Olympics held in Tokyo, Japan, where he won the silver medal in the men's 4 × 100 metre relay with his teammates Andrzej Zieliński, Marian Foik and Marian Dudziak.

Maniak finished second behind Paul Nash in the 100 yards event at the British 1966 AAA Championships.

He died in Kurchatov, Soviet Union, in 1982, while working on the construction of a power plant.

== Legacy ==
The Wiesław Maniak Municipal Athletics Stadium in Szczecin is named in his honour. Since 2018, the Wiesław Maniak Memorial athletics meet is being held there annually.

== International competitions ==
Year	Competition	Venue	Position	Event	Notes
Representing Poland
1964	Olympic Games	Tokyo, Japan	4th	100 m	10.42
1964	Olympic Games	Tokyo, Japan	2nd	4 × 100 m relay	39.36
1965	Universiade	Budapest, Hungary	4th	100 m	10.3 (w)
1965	Universiade	Budapest, Hungary	7th	200 m	21.4 (w)
1965	Universiade	Budapest, Hungary	5th	4 × 100 m relay	41.0
1965	European Cup Final	Stuttgart, West Germany	2nd	4 × 100 m relay	39.5
1966	European Championships	Budapest, Hungary	1st	100 m	10.60
1966	European Championships	Budapest, Hungary	9th (h)	4 × 100 m relay	40.6
1967	European Cup Final	Kiev, Soviet Union	4th	100 m	10.5
1967	European Cup Final	Kiev, Soviet Union	5th	4 × 100 m relay	40.4
1968	European Indoor Games	Madrid, Spain	4th	50 m	5.79
1968	Olympic Games	Mexico City, Mexico	29th (h)	100 m	10.49 (w)
1968	Olympic Games	Mexico City, Mexico	8th	4 × 100 m relay	39.22

== Personal bests ==
Outdoor

- 100 metres – 10.1h (Szczecin 1965)
- 100 metres – 10.35 (Tokyo 1964)
- 200 metres – 21.1h (Szczecin 1967)

Indoor

- 60 metres – 6.5h (Warsaw 1964)
