= Erika Pollmann =

German sprinter

Personal information
- Nationality: German
- Born: 15 February 1944 (age 81)

Sport
- Sport: Sprinting
- Event: 100 metres

Erika Pollmann (born 15 February 1944) is a German sprinter. She competed in the women's 100 metres at the 1964 Summer Olympics.
