= Imants Kukličs =

Latvian hurdler

Personal information
- Nationality: Latvian
- Born: 26 March 1938 (age 88) Riga, Latvia
- Height: 183 cm (6 ft 0 in)
- Weight: 76 kg (168 lb)

Sport
- Sport: Track and field
- Event: 400 metres hurdles

Imants Kukličs (born 26 March 1938), also spelled Imant Kuklich, was a Latvian hurdler. He competed in the men's 400 metres hurdles at the 1964 Summer Olympics in Tokyo, representing the Soviet Union.
