= Hans-Helmut Trense =

German long jumper (born 1940)

Personal information
- Nationality: German
- Born: 17 August 1940 (age 85)

Sport
- Sport: Athletics
- Event: Long jump

Hans-Helmut Trense (born 17 August 1940) is a German athlete. He competed in the men's long jump at the 1964 Summer Olympics.
