= George Anderson (sprinter) =

American sprinter

Personal information
- Born: December 23, 1943 Baton Rouge, Louisiana, United States
- Died: January 15, 2013 (aged 69) Omaha, Nebraska, United States
- Height: 5’10
Medal record
Representing United States
Summer Universiade
Silver medal – second place	1965 Budapest	100m
Silver medal – second place	1965 Budapest	200m

George Anderson (December 23, 1943 – January 15, 2013) was an American sprinter. According to at least one ranking list in 1965 (the peak of his career) he was the world's best 100m sprinter. His most significant competitive victory was in the 100 yard sprint at the 1965 USA Outdoor Track and Field Championships.

== Track career ==
Anderson, known as 'Log', was a native of Baton Rouge, Louisiana, where he graduated from McKinley Senior High School in 1962 before attending Southern University, graduating from there in 1967.

Anderson was a key member of the Southern Jaguars track team during his time at Southern helping them to 3 consecutive Southwestern Athletic Conference championships (SWAC) and National Association of Intercollegiate Athletics (NAIA) indoors and outdoors titles.

As a college junior he had an outstanding season in 1965 that resulted in him being voted the world's best sprinter by the experts of Track and Field News.

The year started with him tying the 60 y record indoors at the NAIA meet in Kansas City. Later that year he became the NAIA champion outdoors at 100 y.

That year he was also to become AAU champion (the United States national championships) at 100 y.

In 1966, he was again 60 y champion at the NAIA championships.

In April 1966, he was a member of a Southern Jaguars team that set a meet record of 39.6 s in the 4×110 y relay at the Texas Relays meet.

Later that year, on May 28. Anderson was a member of a Southern University team that set a world record of 39.6 s in the 4×110 y relay at the California Relays in Modesto, California.

== Later life ==
After graduation from college, Anderson was drafted to play by the Kansas City Chiefs American football team. He was sent by them for experience to the semi-professional team the Omaha Mustangs of the Continental Football League who played in Omaha, Nebraska. He stayed with the Mustangs for seven years and remained in Omaha for the rest of his life.

Anderson was employed as an employment specialist with the Eastern Nebraska Office of Retardation and Development Disability.

Anderson was also track coach at the Omaha North High School and founded and was unit director of the North Omaha Boys and Girls Club track program.

Anderson died on January 16, 2013. His contributions to his local community led his obituaries to describe him as 'a pillar of the community'.

Anderson left a wife, Ola, and three sons.

== Rankings ==
Anderson was ranked among the best in the US and the world in the 100 m sprint between 1965 and 1967, according to the votes of the experts of Track and Field News.

100 meters
Year	World rank	US rank
1965	1st	1st
1966	9th	3rd
1967	-	7th

== USA Championships ==
Anderson was a very successful competitor at 100 m in the USA National Track and Field Championships between 1965 and 1967.

USA Championships
Year	100m
1965	1st
1966	4th
1967	5th
