= Nikolay Ivanov (sprinter) =

Russian sprinter

Personal information
- Nationality: Russian
- Born: 2 June 1942 (age 84)

Sport
- Sport: Sprinting
- Event: 200 metres
Medal record
Men's athletics
Representing Soviet Union
European Championships
Silver medal – second place	1966 Budapest	4×100 m
Silver medal – second place	1969 Athens	4×100 m

Nikolay Ivanov (born 2 June 1942) is a Russian sprinter. He competed in the men's 200 metres at the 1968 Summer Olympics.
