= Bob Frith =

English sprinter

Personal information
- Nationality: British (English)
- Born: 16 June 1944 Whitton, London, England
- Died: 11 April 2021 (aged 76) Marnhull, Dorset
- Education: Chiswick GS & City University, London
- Occupation(s): Optometrist and owner of 12 practices in Middx & Dorset

Sport
- Sport: Athletics
- Event: Sprints
- Club: Polytechnic Harriers
Medal record
Representing Great Britain
European Indoor Championships
Silver medal – second place	1968 Madrid	50m
Bronze medal – third place	1969 Belgrade	50m
Summer Universiade
Bronze medal – third place	1967 Tokyo	4x100m relay

Robert Montague Frith (16 June 1944 – 11 April 2021) was an English track and field athlete.

== Biography ==
Frith's earliest national success saw his Middlesex Schools colleagues, Andrew Ronay, Mick Hauck and the late Barry King, join him in taking the Senior Boys 4x110yards Relay title at the English Schools Championships. Frith was subsequently selected to represent Team GB and England at the international level and won a silver medal at the 1968 European Indoor Games, followed by a bronze at the 1969 competition in Belgrade.

Frith held the world indoor record for 50 metres and was four times National AAA indoor champion over 60 metres.

He represented the England team in the 100 yards, as well as being part of the sprint relay squad, at the 1966 British Empire and Commonwealth Games in Kingston, Jamaica.

He was a member of Polytechnic Harriers and latterly the merged (from 1985) Kingston Athletics Club and Polytechnic Harriers. He was also general secretary of the former club from 1972 to 1975.
