= Boris Zubov =

Russian sprinter

Personal information
- Nationality: Russian
- Born: 1 December 1942 (age 83) Tambov, Russian SFSR, Soviet Union

Sport
- Sport: Sprinting
- Event: 200 metres
Medal record
Representing Soviet Union
Summer Universiade
Silver medal – second place	1965 Budapest	4x100m relay

Boris Zubov (born 1 December 1942) is a Russian sprinter. He competed in the men's 200 metres at the 1964 Summer Olympics.
