= Vadym Arkhypchuk =

Ukrainian sprinter (1937–1973)

Personal information
- Nationality: Ukrainian
- Born: 6 July 1937 Kyiv, Ukrainian SSR, Soviet Union
- Died: 15 January 1973 (aged 35)

Sport
- Sport: Sprinting
- Event: 100/200/400 metres

Vadym Arkhypchuk (Ukrainian: Вадим Архипчук; July 1937 – January 15, 1973) was a Soviet Ukrainian sprinter. He competed in the men's 200 metres at the 1960 Summer Olympics representing the Soviet Union. Arkhypchuk died on January 15, 1973, at the age of 35.
