= Naoki Abe =

Japanese long jumper (born 1945)

Personal information
- Born: 8 April 1945 (age 81) Tottori Prefecture, Japan

Sport
- Sport: Track and field
Medal record
Representing Japan
Summer Universiade
Gold medal – first place	1967 Tokyo	Long jump
Silver medal – second place	1967 Tokyo	4x100m relay

Naoki Abe (阿部 直紀, Abe Naoki; born 8 April 1945) is a Japanese former long jumper who competed in the 1968 Summer Olympics. He won the long jump at the 1967 Summer Universiade, as well as a national title in the 100 metres at the 1965 Japan Championships in Athletics.
