= Rainer Berger =

German sprinter

Personal information
- Nationality: German
- Born: 23 September 1944 (age 81)

Sport
- Sport: Sprinting
- Event: 4 × 100 metres relay

Rainer Berger (born 23 September 1944) is a German sprinter. He competed in the men's 4 × 100 metres relay at the 1964 Summer Olympics.
