= Gertrud Schäfer =

German shot putter

Personal information
- Nationality: German
- Born: 26 October 1944 (age 81) Marl, Nordrhein-Westfalen, Germany
- Height: 168 cm (5 ft 6 in)
- Weight: 80 kg (176 lb)

Sport
- Sport: Athletics
- Event: shot put
- Club: FC Schalke 04

Gertrud Regina Schäfer (born 26 October 1944) is a German retired athlete who competed at the 1968 Summer Olympics.

== Biography ==
Schäfer won the British WAAA Championships title in the shot put event at the 1965 WAAA Championships.

At the 1968 Olympic Games in Mexico City, she represented West Germany in the women's shot put competition.
