= Marian Dudziak =

Polish sprinter (born 1941)

Personal information
- Full name: Marian Andrzej Dudziak
- Born: 2 February 1941 (age 85) Wielichowo, Poland
- Height: 1.81 m (5 ft 11 in)
- Weight: 81 kg (179 lb)

Sport
- Sport: Track and field
- Club: Orkan Poznań; Olimpia Poznań
Medal record
Representing Poland
Summer Olympics]]
Silver medal – second place	1964 Tokyo	4x100 m
European Championships
Silver medal – second place	1966 Budapest	200 m
Silver medal – second place	1971 Helsinki	4x100 m
European Indoor Championships
Silver medal – second place	1968 Madrid	Medley relay

Marian Andrzej Dudziak (born 2 February 1941) is a Polish sprinter who specialized in the 100 metres.

He was born in Wielichowo and represented the clubs Orkan Poznań and Olimpia Poznań. At the 1964 Summer Olympics he won a silver medal in the 4 x 100 metres relay with teammates Andrzej Zieliński, Wiesław Maniak and Marian Foik. He also competed in the 100 metres event, reaching the quarter-final. He achieved his personal best time in the 100 metres in the same year; 10.2 seconds with handtiming.

He won an individual silver medal in 200 metres at the 1966 European Championships. At the 1967 European Indoor Games he finished fifth in the 50 metres race. He also competed in the relay final, but the team did not finish. At the 1968 European Indoor Games he won a silver medal in the medley relay, which he ran with Edmund Borowski, Waldemar Korycki and Andrzej Badeński. At the 1968 Summer Olympics he finished eighth in the 4 x 100 metres relay and reached the quarter-final in the 100 metres event. At the 1971 European Championships he won a silver medal in the 4 x 100 metres relay together with Gerard Gramse, Tadeusz Cuch and Zenon Nowosz.

He became Polish 100 metres champion in 1968 and 200 metres champion in 1966.

== International competitions ==
Year	Competition	Venue	Position	Event	Notes
Representing Poland
1964	Olympic Games	Tokyo, Japan	17th (qf)	100 m	10.52
1964	Olympic Games	Tokyo, Japan	2nd	4 × 100 m relay	39.36
1965	European Cup Final	Stuttgart, West Germany	1st	100 m	10.3
1965	European Cup Final	Stuttgart, West Germany	–	200 m	DQ
1965	European Cup Final	Stuttgart, West Germany	2nd	4 × 100 m relay	39.5
1966	European Championships	Prague, Czechoslovakia	2nd	200 m	21.0
1966	European Championships	Prague, Czechoslovakia	9th (h)	4 × 100 m relay	40.6
1967	European Indoor Games	Madrid, Spain	5th	50 m	6.0
1967	European Indoor Games	Madrid, Spain	1st (h)	Medley relay	3:12.5^{1}
1968	European Indoor Games	Madrid, Spain	10th (sf)	50 m	5.86
1968	European Indoor Games	Madrid, Spain	2nd	Medley relay	3:54.6
1968	Olympic Games	Mexico City, Mexico	17th (qf)	100 m	10.32 (w)
1968	Olympic Games	Mexico City, Mexico	8th	4 × 100 m relay	39.22
1969	European Indoor Games	Belgrade, Yugoslavia	11th (h)	50 m	6.0
1971	European Championships	Helsinki, Finland	2nd	4 × 100 m relay	39.72

^{1}Did not finish in the final

== Personal bests ==
Outdoor

- 100 metres – 10.2h (Kiev 1964)
- 200 metres – 20.7h (Warsaw 1965)
- 200 metres – 20.90 (Budapest 1966)
- 400 metres – 47.4h (Zielona Góra 1965)

Indoor

- 60 metres – 6.6h (1972)
