= Hideo Iijima =

Japanese sprinter and baseball player

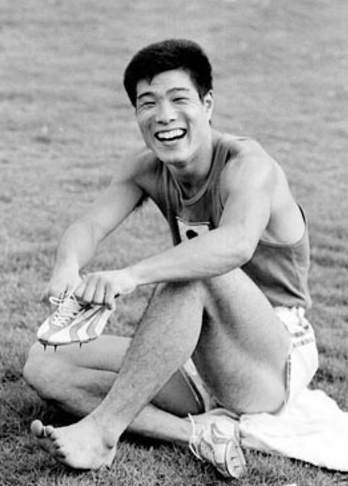
- Hideo Iijima at the 1964 Olympics

Personal information
- Born: January 1, 1944 (age 82) Mito, Ibaraki, Japan
- Height: 1.75 m (5 ft 9 in)
- Weight: 75 kg (165 lb)

Sport
- Sport: Sprint running, baseball
Medal record
Representing Japan
Asian Games
Silver medal – second place	1962 Jakarta	200 m
Silver medal – second place	1962 Jakarta	4×100 m
Bronze medal – third place	1966 Bangkok	100 m
Summer Universiade
Gold medal – first place	1965 Budapest	100 m

Hideo Iijima (飯島 秀雄, Iijima Hideo; born January 1, 1944) is a retired Japanese sprint runner and professional baseball player. He competed at the 1964 and 1968 Olympics in the 100 m and 4 × 100 m relay events, but was eliminated in semifinals on all occasions. At the 1968 Games he ran his personal best in all competitions (10.24–10.34 seconds depending on the wind).

After the 1968 Olympics Iijima became a professional baseball player. He retired in 1971 and for one year worked as a baseball coach.
