= Max Barandun =

Swiss sprinter

Personal information
- Nationality: Swiss
- Born: 5 October 1942 Zurich, Switzerland
- Died: 31 October 2010 (aged 68)

Sport
- Sport: Sprinting
- Event: 100 metres

Max Barandun (25 October 1942 – 31 October 2010) was a Swiss sprinter. He competed in the men's 100 metres at the 1964 Summer Olympics.
