= Jocelyn Delecour =

French sprinter (born 1935)

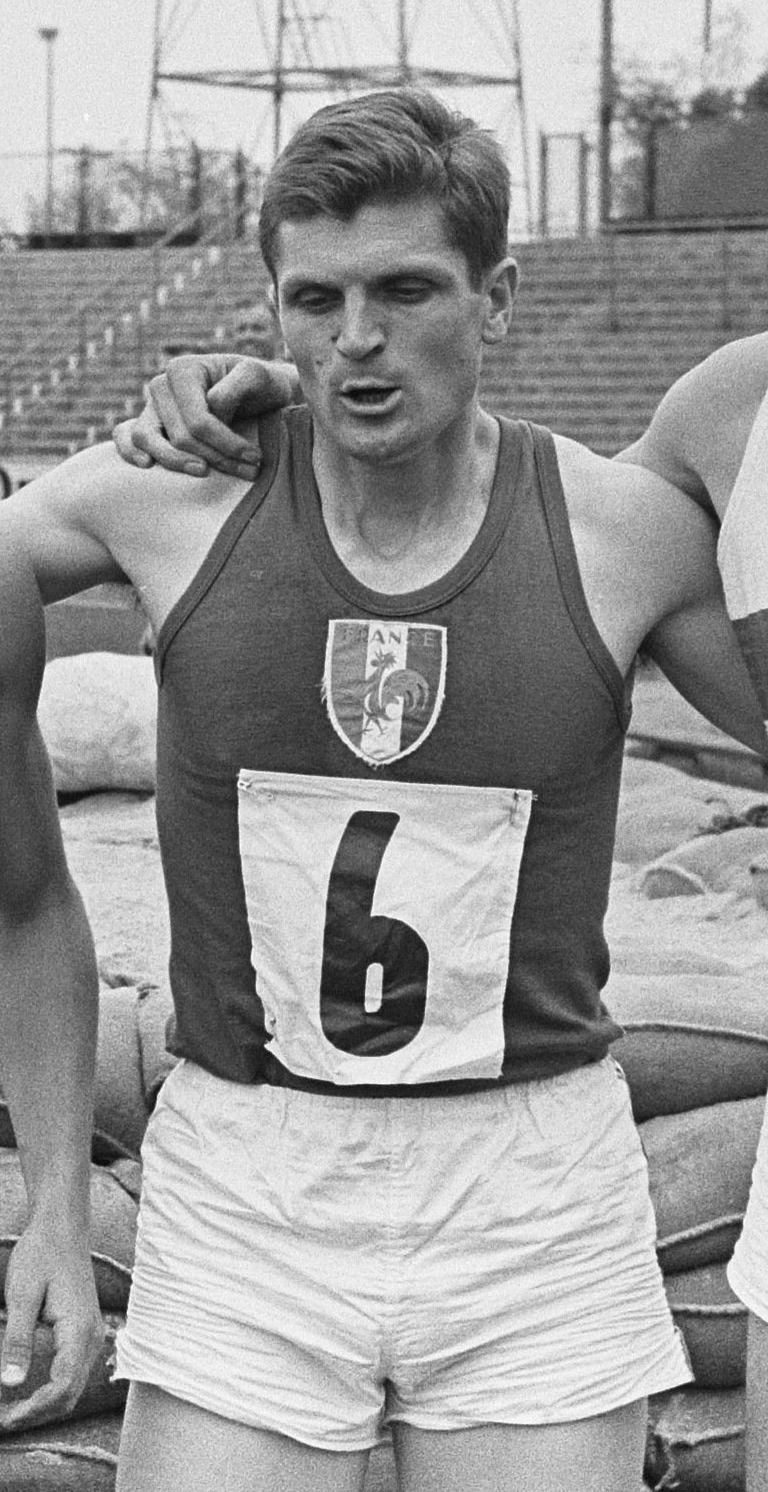
- Delecour in 1963

Personal information
- Born: 2 January 1935 (age 91) Tourcoing, France
- Height: 1.75 m (5 ft 9 in)
- Weight: 67 kg (148 lb)

Sport
- Sport: Sprint running
- Club: UST Athlétisme, Tourcoing; Racing Club de France, Paris

Achievements and titles
- Personal bests: 100 m - 10.31 (1959); 200 m - 20.7 (1963)
Medal record
Men's athletics
Representing France
Olympic Games
Bronze medal – third place	1964 Tokyo	4×100 m
Bronze medal – third place	1968 Mexico City	4×100 m
European Championships
Gold medal – first place	1966 Budapest	4×100 m
Silver medal – second place	1962 Belgrade	100 m
Bronze medal – third place	1958 Stockholm	200 m

Jocelyn Delecour (born 2 January 1935) is a retired French sprinter. He competed in various sprint events at the 1956, 1960, 1964 and 1968 Olympics and won a bronze medal in 1964 in the 4 × 100 metre relay, together with Paul Genevay, Bernard Laidebeur and Claude Piquemal. Four years later he and Piquemal teamed up with Gérard Fenouil and Roger Bambuck to win the bronze medal once again in the same event.

At the European Championships, Delecour won a gold, a silver and a bronze medal in the 4 × 100 m (1966), 100 m (1962) and 200 m (1958) events, respectively.
