= Ewa Kłobukowska =

Polish sprinter (born 1946)

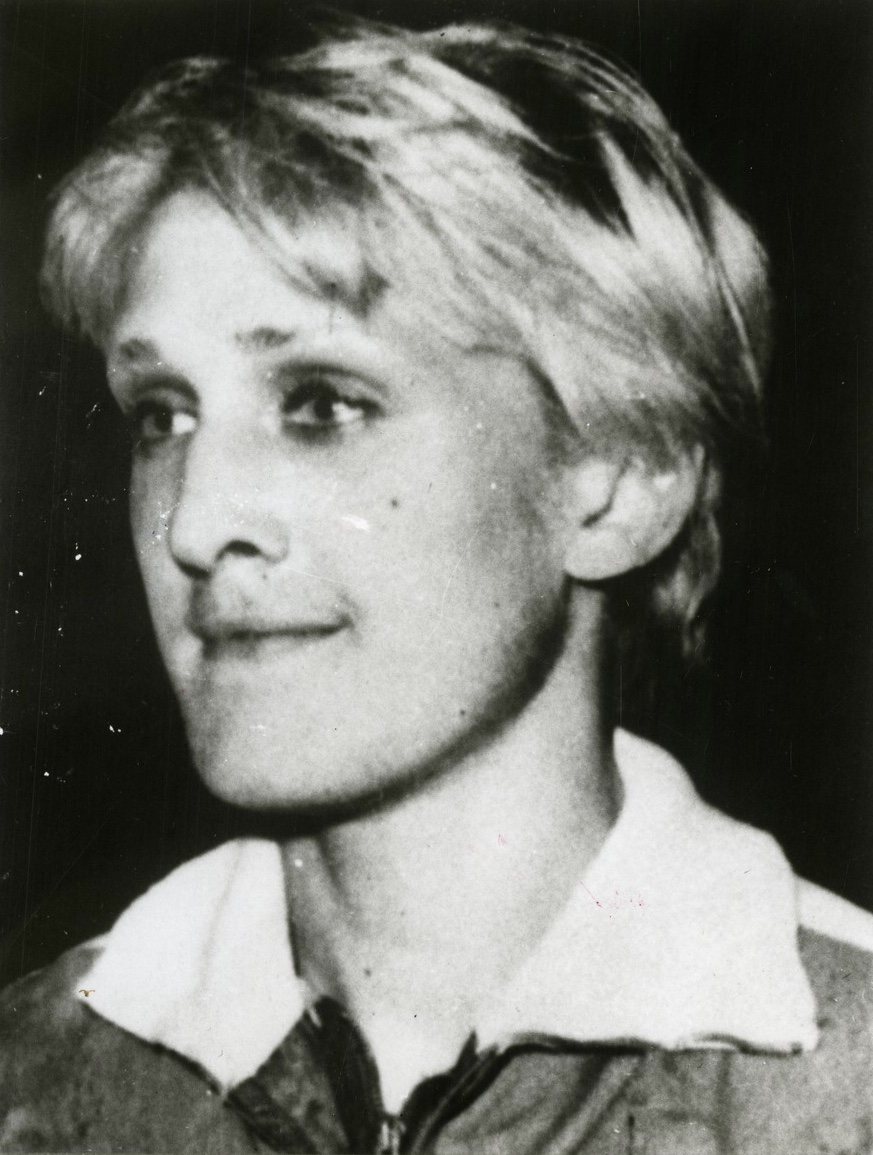
- Ewa Kłobukowska c. 1967

Personal information
- Nationality: Polish
- Born: 1 October 1946 (age 80) Warsaw, Poland
- Height: 1.70 m (5 ft 7 in)
- Weight: 60 kg (132 lb)

Sport
- Sport: Athletics
- Event: Sprint
- Club: Skra Warszawa

Achievements and titles
- Personal bests: 100 m – 11.1 (1965); 200 m – 22.9 (1967)
Medal record
Women's athletics
Representing Poland
Olympic Games
Gold medal – first place	1964 Tokyo	4×100 m
Bronze medal – third place	1964 Tokyo	100 m
European Championships
Gold medal – first place	1966 Budapest	100 m
Gold medal – first place	1966 Budapest	4×100 m
Silver medal – second place	1966 Budapest	200 m

Ewa Janina Kłobukowska (born 1 October 1946) is a Polish former sprinter. She competed at the 1964 Olympics in the 4 × 100 m relay and 100 m sprint and won a gold and a bronze medal, respectively. She also won two gold and one silver medal at the 1966 European Athletics Championships. Kłobukowska set three world records, one in the 100 m (11.1 s, 9 July 1965 in Prague) and two in the 4 × 100 m relay (44.2 s, 13 September 1964, Łódź and 43.6 s, 21 October 1964, Tokyo).

Kłobukowska was at one point considered to be the fastest woman in the world. The American Press made a statement, saying that nobody would beat Kłobukowska for the next 7–8 years following a race in Prague. Despite these successes and laurels, her records were annulled by the International Association of Athletics Federations (IAAF) after a sex identification test in 1967 incorrectly labeled her as not female. The test procedures were later determined to be inadequate.

== Personal life ==
Kłobukowska was born into a family of intellectuals. Her parents did not support Kłobukowska being involved in sports, however, she stood her ground. In 1965, she graduated from a Technical School of Economics No. 6 and in 1972 from the SGH Warsaw School of Economics. She went on to work for a steel construction company called Energomontaż-Północ Gdynia. She then worked as an accountant in a Polish company in Czechoslovakia.

The sex test used for European Cup women's track and field competition in Kyiv in 1967 wrongly identified her as not female, and Kłobukowska was subsequently banned from competing in professional sports. This was surprising considering she passed the anatomical sex test a year prior to this competition. A year later, in 1968, she became pregnant and gave birth to a son.

According to the IAAF, she had "one chromosome too many", likely referring to detection of a Y chromosome in some of her cells. However, if she had been tested one year later at the Mexico Olympics, she would have been eligible on the grounds that she was Barr body (inactive X-chromosome) positive, having a Barr body in each of her cells. The Polish Olympic Committee has stated that athletic federations from the Soviet Union and East Germany targeted Kłobukowska for sporting reasons. Kłobukowska's humiliation led to a change in the sex verification policies by the International Olympic Committee, which from then on kept test results secret.

The IAAF erased the three world records set by Kłobukowska, including the two team records in the 4 × 100 m relay. Even now, there are only a few articles on Kłobukowska because of the erasure of her accomplishments. Kłobukowska is not often seen in the public eye because of the controversy. The reasoning behind this is that it has taken a significant toll on her mental health, almost resulting in suicide. As of 2017, she had still received no formal apology.

== Honours ==
- Knight's Cross of the Order of Polonia Restituta, 1998
- Officer's Cross of the Order of Polonia Restituta, 2011
- Commander's Cross of the Order of Polonia Restituta, 2021

== See also ==
- Sex verification in sports
- Caster Semenya
- Maria José Martínez-Patiño
- Dutee Chand
- Santhi Soundarajan
- Stanisława Walasiewicz
- Helen Stephens
