= Fritz Obersiebrasse =

German sprinter

Personal information
- Born: 30 November 1940 Bielefeld, West Germany
- Died: 11 February 2021 (aged 80) Leverkusen, Germany

Sport
- Sport: Track and field
Medal record
Representing West Germany
Summer Universiade
Gold medal – first place	1965 Budapest	4x100m relay

Fritz Obersiebrasse (30 November 1940 – 11 February 2021) was a German sprinter who competed in the 1964 Summer Olympics.
