= Manfred Knickenberg =

German sprinter

Personal information
- Nationality: German
- Born: 26 August 1937 (age 88) Wuppertal, Germany

Sport
- Sport: Sprinting
- Event: 100 metres
Medal record
Men's athletics
Representing West Germany
European Championships
Bronze medal – third place	1966 Budapest	4×100 m

Manfred Knickenberg (born 26 August 1937) is a German sprinter. He competed in the men's 100 metres at the 1964 Summer Olympics. He won a bronze medal with the sprint relay at the 1966 Europeans, placing fourth in the 100, and he also finished second in the 100 at the 1965 European Cup.
