= Harald Eggers =

German sprinter

Personal information
- Nationality: German
- Born: 7 July 1942 (age 84) Berlin, Germany

Sport
- Sport: Sprinting
- Event: 100 metres

Harald Eggers (born 7 July 1942) is a German sprinter. He competed in the men's 100 metres at the 1968 Summer Olympics representing East Germany. Eggers became East German 100 metres champion in 1966 and 1967, and 200 metres champion in 1967. He represented the club SC Leipzig.
