= Huba Rozsnyai =

Hungarian sprinter (1942–2020)

Personal information
- Nationality: Hungarian
- Born: 14 December 1942 Budapest, Hungary
- Died: 4 December 2020 (aged 77) Budapest, Hungary

Sport
- Sport: Sprinting
- Event: 100 metres

Huba Rozsnyai (14 December 1942 – 4 December 2020) was a Hungarian sprinter.

He competed in the men's 100 metres at the 1964 Summer Olympics. Rozsnyai died from COVID-19 during its pandemic in Hungary.
