= Toru Honda =

Japanese sprinter (born 1941)

Personal information
- Nationality: Japanese
- Born: 5 July 1941 (age 84)

Sport
- Sport: Sprinting
- Event: 4 × 400 metres relay
Medal record
Representing Japan
Asian Games
Gold medal – first place	1966 Bangkok	4x400m relay

Toru Honda (誉田 徹, Honda Tōru; born 5 July 1941) is a Japanese sprinter. He competed in the men's 4 × 400 metres relay at the 1964 Summer Olympics.
