= Heinz Erbstößer =

German sprinter (1940–2026)

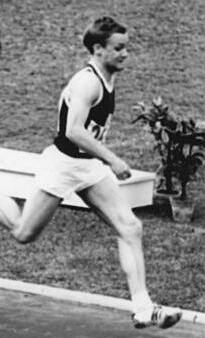
- Erbstößer in 1962

Personal information
- Nationality: German
- Born: 14 March 1940 Torgau, Gau Saxony, Germany
- Died: 23 June 2026 (aged 86) Leipzig, Saxony, Germany

Sport
- Sport: Sprinting
- Event: 100 metres

Heinz Erbstößer (14 March 1940 – 23 June 2026) was a German sprinter. He competed in the men's 200 metres for the United Team of Germany at the 1964 Summer Olympics, and in the men's 100 metres for East Germany at the 1968 Summer Olympics. Erbstößer became the East German 100 metres champion in 1964, 1965, and 1968, and 200 metres champion in 1962, 1963, 1964, 1965, and 1966. He represented the club SC Leipzig.

Erbstößer died on 23 June 2026, at the age of 86.
