= Gert Metz =

German sprinter (1942–2021)

Personal information
- Born: 7 February 1942 Mainz, West Germany
- Died: 17 April 2021 (aged 79) Mainz, Germany

Sport
- Sport: Track and field
Medal record
Representing West Germany
European Championships
Bronze medal – third place	1966 Budapest	4×100 m
European Indoor Championships
Gold medal – first place	1967 Prague	1500m medley relay
Summer Universiade
Gold medal – first place	1965 Budapest	4x100m relay

Gert Metz (7 February 1942 – 17 April 2021) was a German sprinter who competed at the 1968 Summer Olympics in the 100 meters, 200 meters, and 4 × 100 meter relay.

Metz was born in Mainz. In 1970 he ran the 100 m European record in 10 seconds in Burg Gretsch.
