= 1966 European Athletics Championships =

8th European Athletics Championships
- Dates: 30 August – 4 September
- Host city: Budapest, Hungary
- Venue: Népstadion
- Level: Senior
- Type: Outdoor
- Events: 36
- Participation: 769 athletes from 30 nations

The 8th European Athletics Championships were held from 30 August to 4 September 1966 in the Nép Stadium in Budapest, Hungary. Contemporaneous reports on the event were given in the Glasgow Herald.

A new IAAF ruling was applied for the first time making gender verification for female events mandatory. As a consequence, all women competitors were forced to have a sex check. Several of the greatest women athletes missed this year's championships, among them world record holders Iolanda Balaș (high jump) from Romania, as well as Tamara Press (shot put) and Tatyana Shchelkanova (long jump), both from the Soviet Union.

== Medal summary ==
Complete results were published.

=== Men ===
Event	Gold		Silver		Bronze	
100 metres	Wiesław Maniak (POL)	10.5	Roger Bambuck (FRA)	10.5	Claude Piquemal (FRA)	10.5
200 metres	Roger Bambuck (FRA)	20.9	Marian Dudziak (POL)	21.0	Jean-Claude Nallet (FRA)	21.0
400 metres	Stanisław Grędziński (POL)	46.0	Andrzej Badeński (POL)	46.2	Manfred Kinder (FRG)	46.3
800 metres	Manfred Matuschewski (GDR)	1:45.9 CR	Franz-Josef Kemper (FRG)	1:46.0	Bodo Tümmler (FRG)	1:46.3
1500 metres	Bodo Tümmler (FRG)	3:41.9	Michel Jazy (FRA)	3:42.2	Harald Norpoth (FRG)	3:42.4
5000 metres	Michel Jazy (FRA)	13:42.8 CR	Harald Norpoth (FRG)	13:44.0	Bernd Diessner (GDR)	13:47.8
10,000 metres	Jürgen Haase (GDR)	28:26.0 CR	Lajos Mecser (HUN)	28:27.0	Leonid Mikitenko (URS)	28:32.2
110 metres hurdles	Eddy Ottoz (ITA)	13.7 =CR	Hinrich John (FRG)	14.0	Marcel Duriez (FRA)	14.0
400 metres hurdles	Roberto Frinolli (ITA)	49.8	Gerd Lossdorfer (FRG)	50.3	Robert Poirier (FRA)	50.5
3000 metres steeplechase	Viktor Kudinskiy (URS)	8:26.6 CR	Anatoliy Kuryan (URS)	8:28.0	Gaston Roelants (BEL)	8:28.0
4 × 100 metres relay	France; Marc Berger; Jocelyn Delecour; Claude Piquemal; Roger Bambuck	39.4 CR	Soviet Union; Edvin Ozolin; Armin Tuyakov; Boris Savchuk; Nikolay Ivanov	39.8	West Germany; Hans-Jürgen Felsen; Gert Metz; Dieter Enderlein; Manfred Knickenberg	39.8
4 × 400 metres relay	Poland; Jan Werner; Edmund Borowski; Stanisław Grędziński; Andrzej Badeński	3:04.5 CR	West Germany; Friedrich Roderfeld; Jens Ulbricht; Rolf Krusmann; Manfred Kinder	3:04.8	East Germany; Joachim Both; Günter Klann; Michael Zerbes; Wilfried Weiland	3:05.7
Marathon	Jim Hogan (GBR)	2:20:04.6	Aurèle Vandendriessche (BEL)	2:21:43.6	Gyula Tóth (HUN)	2:22:02.0
20 kilometres walk	Dieter Lindner (GDR)	1:29:25.0 CR	Vladimir Golubnichiy (URS)	1:30:06.0	Nikolay Smaga (URS)	1:30:18.0
50 kilometres walk	Abdon Pamich (ITA)	4:18:42.0	Genhady Agapov (URS)	4:20:01.2	Oleksandr Shcherbyna (URS)	4:20:47.2
High jump	Jacques Madubost (FRA)	2.12 m	Robert Sainte-Rose (FRA)	2.12 m	Valeriy Skvortsov (URS)	2.09 m
Pole vault	Wolfgang Nordwig (GDR)	5.10 m CR	Christos Papanikolaou (GRE)	5.05 m	Hervé d'Encausse (FRA)	5.00 m
Long jump	Lynn Davies (GBR)	7.98 m CR	Igor Ter-Ovanesyan (URS)	7.88 m	Jean Cochard (FRA)	7.88 m
Triple jump	Georgi Stoykovski (BUL)	16.67 m CR	Hans-Jürgen Rückborn (GDR)	16.66 m	Henrik Kalocsai (HUN)	16.59 m
Shot put	Vilmos Varjú (HUN)	19.43 m CR	Nikolay Karasev (URS)	18.82 m	Władysław Komar (POL)	18.68 m
Discus throw	Detlef Thorith (GDR)	57.42 m CR	Hartmut Losch (GDR)	57.34 m	Lothar Milde (GDR)	56.80 m
Javelin throw	Jānis Lūsis (URS)	84.48 m CR	Władysław Nikiciuk (POL)	81.76 m	Gergely Kulcsár (HUN)	80.54 m
Hammer throw	Romuald Klim (URS)	70.02 m CR	Gyula Zsivótzky (HUN)	68.62 m	Uwe Beyer (FRG)	67.28 m
Decathlon	Werner von Moltke (FRG)	7740 pts	Jörg Mattheis (FRG)	7614 pts	Horst Beyer (FRG)	7562 pts

=== Women ===
Event	Gold		Silver		Bronze	
100 metres^{[nb1]}	Ewa Kłobukowska (POL)	11.5	Irena Kirszenstein (POL)	11.5	Karin Frisch (FRG)	11.8
200 metres	Irena Kirszenstein (POL)	23.1 CR	Ewa Kłobukowska (POL)	23.4	Vera Popkova (URS)	23.7
400 metres	Anna Chmelková (TCH)	52.9 CR	Antónia Munkácsi (HUN)	53.9	Monique Noirot (FRA)	54.0
800 metres	Vera Nikolić (YUG)	2:02.8 =CR	Zsuzsa Szabóné Nagy (HUN)	2:03.1	Antje Gleichfeld (FRG)	2:03.7
80 metres hurdles	Karin Balzer (GDR)	10.7	Karin Frisch (FRG)	10.7	Elzbieta Bednarek (POL)	10.7
4 × 100 metres relay	Poland; Elzbieta Bednarek; Danuta Straszynska; Irena Kirszenstein; Ewa Kłobukowska	44.4 CR	West Germany; Renate Meyer; Hannelore Trabert; Karin Frisch; Jutta Stöck	44.5	Soviet Union; Vera Popkova; Valentyna Bolshova; Lyudmila Samotyosova; Renāte Lāce	44.6
High jump	Taisia Chenchik (URS)	1.75 m	Ludmila Komleva (URS)	1.73 m	Jarosława Bieda (POL)	1.71 m
Long jump	Irena Kirszenstein (POL)	6.55 m CR	Diana Yorgova (BUL)	6.45 m	Helga Hoffmann (FRG)	6.38 m
Shot put	Nadezhda Chizhova (URS)	17.22 m	Margitta Gummel (GDR)	17.05 m	Marita Lange (GDR)	16.96 m
Discus throw	Christine Spielberg (GDR)	57.76 m CR	Liesel Westermann (FRG)	57.38 m	Anita Hentschel (GDR)	56.80 m
Javelin throw	Marion Lüttge (GDR)	58.74 m CR	Mihaela Peneş (ROM)	56.94 m	Valentina Popova (URS)	56.70 m
Pentathlon	Valentina Tikhomirova (URS)	4787 pts	Heide Rosendahl (FRG)	4765 pts	Inge Exner (GDR)	4713 pts

- ^{nb1} The women's 100 metres gold medallist Ewa Kłobukowska equalled the championship record twice in qualifying, running 11.4 seconds.

== Medal table ==
Rank	Nation	Gold	Silver	Bronze	Total
1	East Germany (GDR)	8	3	6	17
2	Poland (POL)	7	5	3	15
3	Soviet Union (URS)	6	7	7	20
4	France (FRA)	4	3	7	14
5	Italy (ITA)	3	0	0	3
6	West Germany (FRG)	2	10	9	21
7	Great Britain (GBR)	2	0	0	2
8	Hungary (HUN)	1	4	3	8
9	Bulgaria (BUL)	1	1	0	2
10	Czechoslovakia (TCH)	1	0	0	1
10	Yugoslavia (YUG)	1	0	0	1
12	Belgium (BEL)	0	1	1	2
13	Greece (GRE)	0	1	0	1
13	Romania (ROU)	0	1	0	1
Totals (14 entries)		36	36	36	108

== Participation ==
According to an unofficial count, 770 athletes from 29 countries participated in the event, one athletes more than the official number of 769 and one country less than the official number of 30 as published.

- Albania (20)
- Austria (11)
- Belgium (16)
- Bulgaria (14)
- Czechoslovakia (49)
- Denmark (7)
- East Germany (61)
- Finland (16)
- France (52)
- Gibraltar (1)
- Great Britain (57)
- Greece (15)
- Hungary (68)
- Iceland (3)
- Ireland (8)
- Italy (35)
- Luxembourg (3)
- Netherlands (19)
- Norway (15)
- Poland (56)
- Portugal (1)
- Romania (18)
- Soviet Union (83)
- Spain (7)
- Sweden (25)
- Switzerland (13)
- Turkey (10)
- West Germany (74)
- Yugoslavia (13)
