= Hans-Jürgen Felsen =

German sprinter

Personal information
- Born: 30 January 1940 (age 86) Beuthen, Poland

Sport
- Sport: Track and field
Medal record
Representing West Germany
European Championships
Bronze medal – third place	1966 Budapest	4×100 m
Summer Universiade
Gold medal – first place	1965 Budapest	4x100m
Bronze medal – third place	1961 Sofia	4x100m

Hans-Jürgen Felsen (born 30 January 1940) is a German former sprinter. He won a bronze medal in the men's 4 × 100 metres relay competition at the 1966 European Athletics Championships.
