= José Luis Sánchez (runner) =

Spanish sprinter

Personal information
- Nationality: Spanish
- Born: José Luis Sánchez Paraíso; 21 June 1942 Lagunilla, Salamanca, Spain
- Died: 18 July 2017 (aged 75) Salamanca, Spain
- Height: 170 cm (5 ft 7 in)
- Weight: 62 kg (137 lb)

Sport
- Sport: Sprinting
- Event: 100 metres
Medal record
Representing Spain
European Indoor Championships
Bronze medal – third place	1968 Madrid	1820m medley relay
Mediterranean Games
Silver medal – second place	1967 Tunis	4x100m relay
Bronze medal – third place	1975 Algiers	4x100m relay

José Luis Sánchez Paraíso (21 June 1942 – 18 July 2017) was a Spanish sprinter. He competed in the men's 100 metres at the 1968 Summer Olympics and in the men's 4 × 100 metres relay at the 1972 and 1976 Summer Olympics. He was also national champion twelve times; eight in the 100 metres (1963–66, 1971–73, and 1979) and four in the 200 metres (1962, 1964–65, and 1966).
