= Edvin Ozolin =

Soviet-Latvian sprinter

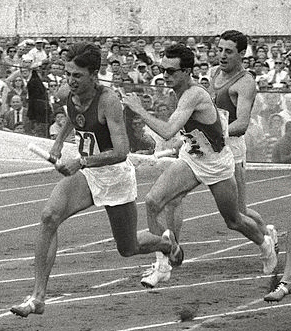
- Edvin Ozolin (left) at the 1960 Olympics

Personal information
- Born: Edvin Sigizmundovich Ozolin; Эдвин Сигизмундович Озолин; 12 February 1939 (age 87) Leningrad, Russian SFSR, Soviet Union
- Height: 1.84 m (6 ft 0 in)
- Weight: 74 kg (163 lb)

Sport
- Sport: Athletics
- Event: Sprint
- Club: Burevestnik Leningrad; SKA, Leningrad

Achievements and titles
- Personal bests: 100 m – 10.2 (1962); 200 m – 20.8 (1965)
Medal record
Men's athletics
Representing Soviet Union
Olympic Games
| Silver medal – second place | 1960 Rome | 4×100 m |
European Championships
| Silver medal – second place | 1966 Budapest | 4×100 m |
| Bronze medal – third place | 1958 Stockholm | 4×100 m |
Summer Universiade
| Gold medal – first place | 1961 Sofia | 4×100 m |
| Gold medal – first place | 1963 Porto Allegre | 200 m |
| Gold medal – first place | 1965 Budapest | 200 m |
| Silver medal – second place | 1963 Porto Allegre | 100 m |
| Silver medal – second place | 1965 Budapest | 4×100 m |

Edvin Sigizmundovich Ozolin (Russian: Эдвин Сигизмундович Озолин, born 12 February 1939) is a retired Soviet runner and athletics coach. He competed in various sprint events at the 1960 and 1964 Olympics and won a silver medal in the 4 × 100 m relay. He won four medals in the relay at the European championships in 1958 and 1966 and at the Summer Universiade in 1961 and 1965. Individually he won 200 m at the 1963 and 1965 Universiade.

Ozolin was born in Leningrad. He took up athletics in 1955 and soon became the best Soviet sprinter of the 1960s, winning 16 national titles: in the 100 m (1959–1963), 200 m (1960–1961 and 1963), 4 × 100 m relay (1957, 1961, 1965–1966, and 1968) and 200 m hurdles (1963 and 1967). Later he had a long career as a coach. In 1984–1992 he headed the Soviet sprinting and hurdling team and in 1992–2003 the Malaysian track and field team. He wrote several textbooks on sprint running.
