= Ito Giani =

Italian athletics sprinter (1941–2018)

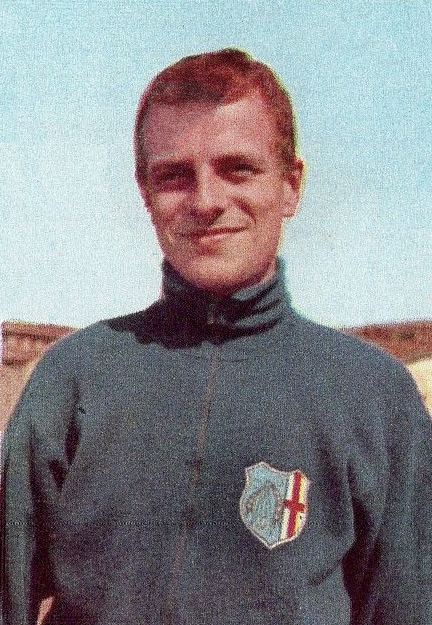

Personal information
- Full name: Ippolito Giani
- Born: 5 September 1941 Varese, Italy
- Died: 28 September 2018 (aged 77) Varese
- Height: 1.76 m (5 ft 9 1/2 in)
- Weight: 67 kg (148 lb)

Sport
- Country: Italy
- Sport: Athletics
- Event: Sprint
- Club: Società Ginnastica Gallaratese

Achievements and titles
- Personal best: 100 m: 10.4 (1966)
Medal record
European Indoor Championship
Silver medal – second place	1966 Dortmund	Medley relay
Summer Universiade
Gold medal – first place	1967 Tokyo	4×100 m relay
Bronze medal – third place	1967 Tokyo	100 m
Bronze medal – third place	1967 Tokyo	200 m
Mediterranean Games
Gold medal – first place	1967 Tunis	200 m
Gold medal – first place	1967 Tunis	4×100 m relay

Ippolito "Ito" Giani (5 September 1941 – 28 September 2018) was an Italian sprinter.

== Biography ==
From 1963 to 1967, he took part in 20 international competitions, including the 1964 Summer Olympics, and won six medals. Domestically, Giani won the 200 m Italian title in 1967.

== Achievements ==
Year	Competition	Venue	Position	Event	Performance	Note
1964	Olympic Games	(Japan) Tokyo	Heat	100 metres	10.6	
1966	European Indoor Games	(West Germany) Dortmund	2nd	Medley relay	3.22.2	

== See also ==
- 200 metres winners of Italian Athletics Championships
- Italy national relay team
