= Italy at the 2025 European Athletics Indoor Championships =

Italy team at athletics event

- WA code: ITA
- National federation: FIDAL

in (Netherlands) Apeldoorn 6 March 2025 – 9 March 2025
- Competitors: 37
- Medals Ranked 2nd: Gold 3 Silver 1 Bronze 2 Total 6

European Athletics Indoor Championships appearances (overview)
- 1966; 1967; 1968; 1969; 1970; 1971; 1972; 1973; 1974; 1975; 1976; 1977; 1978; 1979; 1980; 1981; 1982; 1983; 1984; 1985; 1986; 1987; 1988; 1989; 1990; 1992; 1994; 1996; 1998; 2000; 2002; 2005; 2007; 2009; 2011; 2013; 2015; 2017; 2019; 2021; 2023

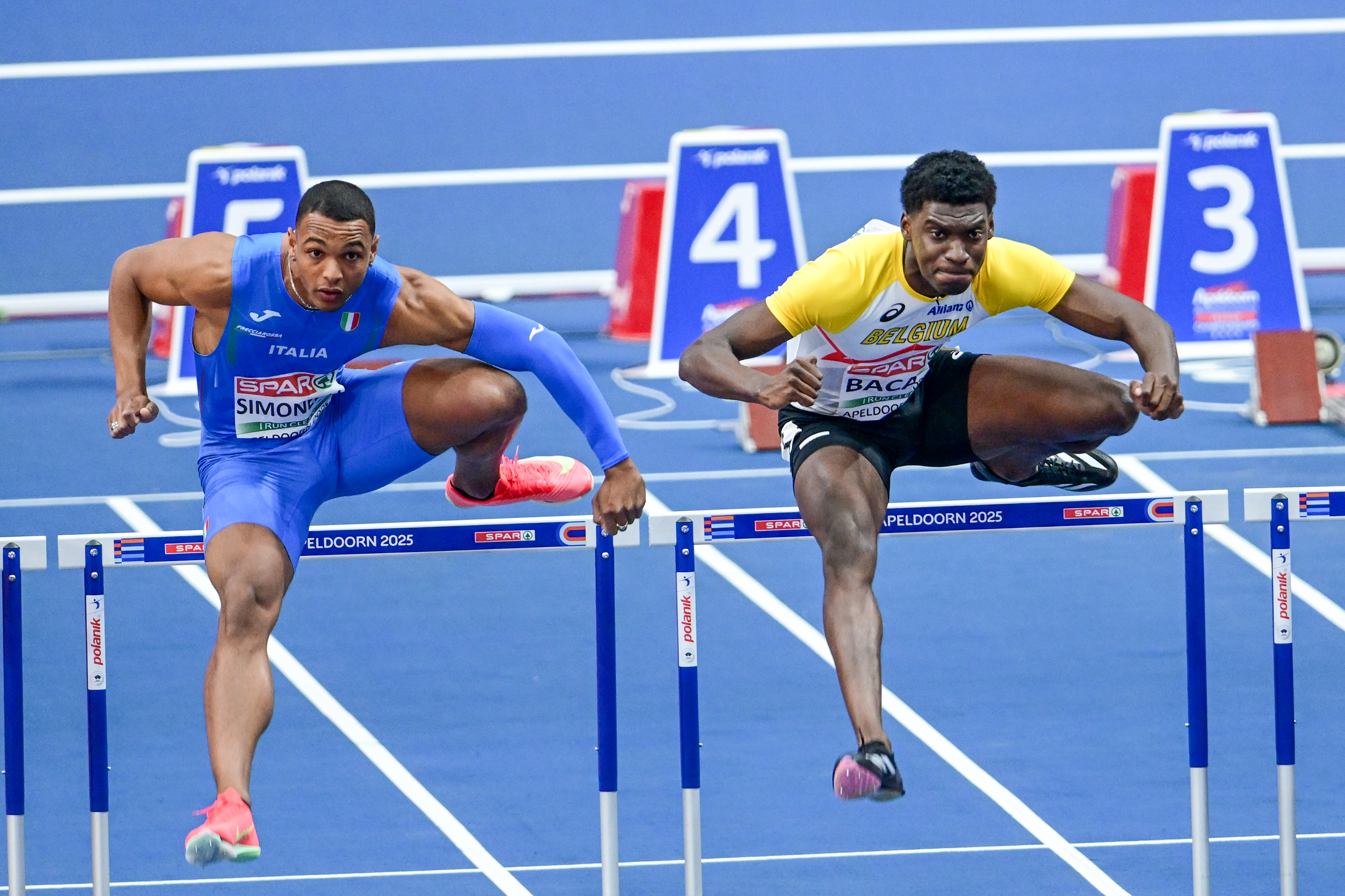
Lorenzo Simonelli (left) semifinalist in the60 m hs.

Italy competed at the 2025 European Athletics Indoor Championships in Apeldoorn, Netherlands (Omnisport Apeldoorn), from 6 to 9 March 2025.

In this edition of the championships, Italy won six medals, 3 of which were gold, finishing in 2nd place in the medal table.

== Medalists ==
| Medal | Athlete | Event |
|---|---|---|
| 1st place, gold medalist(s) | Andy Diaz | Men's triple jump |
| 1st place, gold medalist(s) | Zaynab Dosso | Women's 60 m |
| 1st place, gold medalist(s) | Larissa Iapichino | Women's long jump |
| 2nd place, silver medalist(s) | Mattia Furlani | Men's long jump |
| 3rd place, bronze medalist(s) | Matteo Sioli | Men's high jump |
| 3rd place, bronze medalist(s) | Andrea Dallavalle | Men's triple jump |

== See also ==
- Italy national athletics team
