= Italy at the 1984 European Athletics Indoor Championships =

Italy team at athletics event

- WA code: ITA
- National federation: FIDAL

in (Sweden) Gothenburg 3 March 1984 – 4 March 1984
- Competitors: 22 (16 men, 6 women)
- Medals Ranked 6th: Gold 1 Silver 4 Bronze 3 Total 8

European Athletics Indoor Championships appearances (overview)
- 1966; 1967; 1968; 1969; 1970; 1971; 1972; 1973; 1974; 1975; 1976; 1977; 1978; 1979; 1980; 1981; 1982; 1983; 1984; 1985; 1986; 1987; 1988; 1989; 1990; 1992; 1994; 1996; 1998; 2000; 2002; 2005; 2007; 2009; 2011; 2013; 2015; 2017; 2019; 2021; 2023

Italy competed at the 1984 European Athletics Indoor Championships in Gothenburg, Sweden, from 3 to 4 March 1984.

== Medalists ==
Medal	Athlete	Event
1st place, gold medalist(s)	Donato Sabia	Men's 800 m
2nd place, silver medalist(s)	Antonio Ullo	Men's 60 m
2nd place, silver medalist(s)	Roberto Tozzi	Men's 400 m
2nd place, silver medalist(s)	Riccardo Materazzi	Men's 1500 m
2nd place, silver medalist(s)	Erica Rossi	Women's 400 m
3rd place, bronze medalist(s)	Giovanni Bongiorni	Men's 200 m
3rd place, bronze medalist(s)	Alessandro Andrei	Men's shot put
3rd place, bronze medalist(s)	Stefania Lazzaroni	Women's long jump

== Top eight ==
14 Italian athletes reached the top eight in this edition of the championships.

Men

Athlete	60 m	200 m	400 m	800 m	1500 m	3000 m	60 m hs	High jump	Pole vault	Long jump	Triple jump	Shot put
Antonio Ullo	2nd place, silver medalist(s)											
Giovanni Bongiorni		3rd place, bronze medalist(s)										
Roberto Tozzi			2nd place, silver medalist(s)									
Donato Sabia				1st place, gold medalist(s)								
Riccardo Materazzi					2nd place, silver medalist(s)							
Daniele Fontecchio							5					
Marco Piochi										4		
Giovanni Evangelisti										5		
Dario Badinelli											8	
Alessandro Andrei												3rd place, bronze medalist(s)

Women

Athlete	60 m	200 m	400 m	800 m	1500 m	3000 m	60 m hs	High jump	Long jump	Shot put
Erica Rossi			2nd place, silver medalist(s)							
Gabriella Dorio					8					
Agnese Possamai						5				
Stefania Lazzaroni									3rd place, bronze medalist(s)	

== See also ==
- Italy national athletics team
