= Italy at the European Athletics Indoor Championships =

Italy national athetics team at the international competitions

- WA code: ITA
- National federation: FIDAL
- Website: www.fidal.it
- Medals Ranked 8th: Gold 39 Silver 42 Bronze 35 Total 116

European Athletics Indoor Championships appearances (overview)
- 1966; 1967; 1968; 1969; 1970; 1971; 1972; 1973; 1974; 1975; 1976; 1977; 1978; 1979; 1980; 1981; 1982; 1983; 1984; 1985; 1986; 1987; 1988; 1989; 1990; 1992; 1994; 1996; 1998; 2000; 2002; 2005; 2007; 2009; 2011; 2013; 2015; 2017; 2019; 2021; 2023

Italy (ITA) has competed at the European Indoor Athletics Championships since first edition the 1966 European Indoor Games, Italians athletes have won a total of 100 medals.

== Summary ==
Italians have won 21 titles in the men's field and 13 in the women's field.

Men's multiple medallists are: Eddy Ottoz (3 gold); Fabrizio Donato (1 gold, 2 silver); Giovanni De Benedictis (1 gold, 1 silver, 1 bronze); Giovanni Evangelisti (1 silver, 2 bronze); Stefano Tilli (2 gold); Claudio Licciardello (1 gold, 1 silver); Maurizio Damilano and Gianmarco Tamberi (1 gold, 1 silver); Renato Dionisi (1 gold, 1 bronze); Pierfrancesco Pavoni (2 silver); Stefano Malinverni and Paolo Dal Molin (1 silver, 1 bronze); Ashraf Saber and Antonio Ullo (1 silver, 1 bronze).

Women's multiple medallists are: Sara Simeoni (4 gold); Agnese Possamai (3 gold, 1 silver); Ileana Salvador (3 silver); Rita Bottiglieri (1 silver, 2 bronze); Assunta Legnante and Antonietta Di Martino (1 gold, 1 silver); Annarita Sidoti and Simona La Mantia (1 gold, 1 bronze); Carla Barbarino and Patrizia Spuri (1 silver, 1 bronze).

== Medals ==
| Edition | Men | | | Women | | | Total | | | Gold | Silver | Bronze |
|---|---|---|---|---|---|---|---|---|---|---|---|---|
| Edition | 1st place, gold medalist(s) | 2nd place, silver medalist(s) | 3rd place, bronze medalist(s) | 1st place, gold medalist(s) | 2nd place, silver medalist(s) | 3rd place, bronze medalist(s) | 1st place, gold medalist(s) | 2nd place, silver medalist(s) | 3rd place, bronze medalist(s) | Gold | Silver | Bronze |
| Dortmund 1966 | 1 | 1 | 0 | 0 | 0 | 0 | 1 | 1 | 0 | Eddy Ottoz | Medley relay Bruno Bianchi; Sergio Bello; Sergio Ottolina; Ippolito Giani | |
| Prague 1967 | 2 | 0 | 0 | 0 | 0 | 0 | 2 | 0 | 0 | Pasquale Giannattasio; Eddy Ottoz | | |
| Madrid 1968 | 1 | 0 | 0 | 0 | 0 | 0 | 1 | 0 | 0 | Eddy Ottoz | | |
| Belgrade 1969 | 0 | 0 | 0 | 0 | 0 | 0 | 0 | 0 | 0 | | | |
| Vienna 1970 | 0 | 0 | 0 | 0 | 0 | 0 | 0 | 0 | 0 | | | |
| Sofia 1971 | 0 | 0 | 2 | 0 | 0 | 0 | 0 | 0 | 2 | | | Gianni Del Buono; Sergio Liani |
| Grenoble 1972 | 0 | 0 | 0 | 0 | 0 | 0 | 0 | 0 | 0 | | | |
| Rotterdam 1973 | 1 | 0 | 0 | 0 | 0 | 0 | 1 | 0 | 0 | Renato Dionisi | | |
| Göteborg 1974 | 0 | 0 | 0 | 0 | 0 | 0 | 0 | 0 | 0 | | | |
| Katowice 1975 | 0 | 0 | 0 | 0 | 0 | 0 | 0 | 0 | 0 | | | |
| Munich 1976 | 0 | 0 | 1 | 0 | 0 | 0 | 0 | 0 | 1 | | | Renato Dionisi |
| San Sebastian 1977 | 0 | 0 | 0 | 1 | 0 | 2 | 1 | 0 | 2 | Sara Simeoni | | Rita Bottiglieri (2) |
| Milan 1978 | 1 | 0 | 1 | 1 | 1 | 0 | 2 | 1 | 1 | Pietro Mennea; Sara Simeoni | Rita Bottiglieri | Giuseppe Buttari |
| Vienna 1979 | 0 | 1 | 0 | 0 | 0 | 0 | 0 | 1 | 0 | | Stefano Malinverni | |
| Sindelfingen 1980 | 0 | 0 | 0 | 1 | 0 | 0 | 1 | 0 | 0 | Sara Simeoni | | |
| Grenoble 1981 | 0 | 1 | 1 | 2 | 0 | 0 | 2 | 1 | 1 | Sara Simeoni; Agnese Possamai | Maurizio Damilano | Stefano Malinverni |
| Milan 1982 | 1 | 2 | 2 | 2 | 0 | 0 | 3 | 2 | 2 | Gabriella Dorio; Agnese Possamai; Maurizio Damilano | Alberto Cova; Carlo Mattioli | Michele Di Pace; Giovanni Evangelisti |
| Budapest 1983 | 1 | 0 | 1 | 0 | 1 | 1 | 1 | 1 | 2 | Stefano Tilli | Agnese Possamai | Massimo Di Giorgio; Marisa Masullo |
| Göteborg 1984 | 1 | 3 | 2 | 0 | 1 | 1 | 1 | 4 | 3 | Donato Sabia | Antonio Ullo; Roberto Tozzi; Riccardo Materazzi; Erica Rossi | Giovanni Bongiorni; Alessandro Andrei; Stefania Lazzaroni |
| Athens 1985 | 1 | 0 | 0 | 1 | 0 | 0 | 2 | 0 | 0 | Stefano Tilli; Agnese Possamai | | |
| Madrid 1986 | 0 | 2 | 1 | 0 | 0 | 0 | 0 | 2 | 1 | | Stefano Mei; Daniele Fontecchio | Marco Montelatici |
| Liévin 1987 | 0 | 2 | 1 | 0 | 1 | 0 | 0 | 3 | 1 | | Pierfrancesco Pavoni; Giovanni Evangelisti; Giuliana Salce | Antonio Ullo |
| Budapest 1988 | 0 | 0 | 1 | 0 | 0 | 0 | 0 | 0 | 1 | | | Giovanni Evangelisti |
| The Hague 1989 | 0 | 0 | 1 | 0 | 1 | 0 | 0 | 1 | 1 | | Ileana Salvador | Giovanni De Benedictis |
| Glasgow 1990 | 1 | 2 | 0 | 0 | 1 | 1 | 1 | 3 | 1 | Sandro Floris | Pierfrancesco Pavoni; Giovanni De Benedictis; Ileana Salvador | Annarita Sidoti |
| Genova 1992 | 2 | 1 | 1 | 0 | 1 | 0 | 2 | 2 | 1 | Gennaro Di Napoli; Giovanni De Benedictis | Andrea Nuti; Ileana Salvador | Tonino Viali |
| Paris 1994 | 0 | 0 | 0 | 1 | 0 | 0 | 1 | 0 | 0 | Annarita Sidoti | | |
| Stockholm 1996 | 1 | 1 | 1 | 0 | 0 | 0 | 1 | 1 | 1 | Paolo Dal Soglio | Giuseppe D'Urso | Ashraf Saber |
| Valencia 1998 | 0 | 1 | 0 | 1 | 0 | 0 | 1 | 1 | 0 | Fiona May | Ashraf Saber | |
| Gand 2000 | 0 | 1 | 1 | 0 | 0 | 0 | 0 | 1 | 1 | | 4x400 mrelay Francesca Carbone; Carla Barbarino; Patrizia Spuri; Virna De Angeli | Paolo Camossi |
| Vienna 2002 | 0 | 0 | 1 | 0 | 1 | 0 | 0 | 1 | 1 | | Assunta Legnante | 4x400 m relay Daniela Reina; Patrizia Spuri; Carla Barbarino; Danielle Perpoli |
| Madrid 2005 | 0 | 0 | 0 | 0 | 1 | 0 | 0 | 1 | 0 | | Magdelín Martínez | |
| Birmingham 2007 | 2 | 0 | 1 | 1 | 1 | 1 | 3 | 1 | 2 | Cosimo Caliandro; Andrew Howe; Assunta Legnante | Antonietta Di Martino | Maurizio Bobbato; Silvia Weissteiner |
| Turin 2009 | 2 | 2 | 1 | 0 | 0 | 1 | 2 | 2 | 2 | Fabrizio Donato; 4x400 m relay Jacopo Marin; Matteo Galvan; Domenico Rao; Claudio Licciardello | Claudio Licciardello; Fabio Cerutti | Emanuele Di Gregorio; Elisa Cusma |
| Paris 2011 | 0 | 1 | 0 | 2 | 0 | 0 | 2 | 1 | 0 | Simona La Mantia; Antonietta Di Martino | Fabrizio Donato | |
| Göteborg 2013 | 1 | 1 | 1 | 0 | 1 | 2 | 1 | 2 | 3 | Daniele Greco | Paolo Dal Molin; Veronica Borsi | Michael Tumi; Simona La Mantia; Chiara Rosa |
| Praga 2015 | 0 | 1 | 0 | 0 | 1 | 1 | 0 | 2 | 1 | | Silvano Chesani; Alessia Trost | Federica Del Buono |
| Belgrade 2017 | 0 | 1 | 0 | 0 | 0 | 0 | 0 | 1 | 0 | | Fabrizio Donato | |
| Glasgow 2019 | 1 | 0 | 0 | 0 | 0 | 1 | 1 | 0 | 1 | Gianmarco Tamberi | | 4x400 m relay Raphaela Lukudo; Ayomide Folorunso; Chiara Bazzoni; Marta Milani |
| Torun 2021 | 1 | 1 | 1 | 0 | 0 | 0 | 1 | 1 | 1 | Marcell Jacobs | Gianmarco Tamberi | Paolo Dal Molin |
| Istanbul 2023 | 2 | 1 | 0 | 0 | 3 | 0 | 2 | 4 | 0 | Zane Weir; Samuele Ceccarelli | Marcell Jacobs; Dariya Derkach; 4x400 m relay Alice Mangione; Ayomide Folorunso; Anna Polinari; Eleonora Marchiando Larissa Iapichino | |
| | 23 | 26 | 22 | 13 | 15 | 11 | 36 | 41 | 33 | | | |

Some medalists
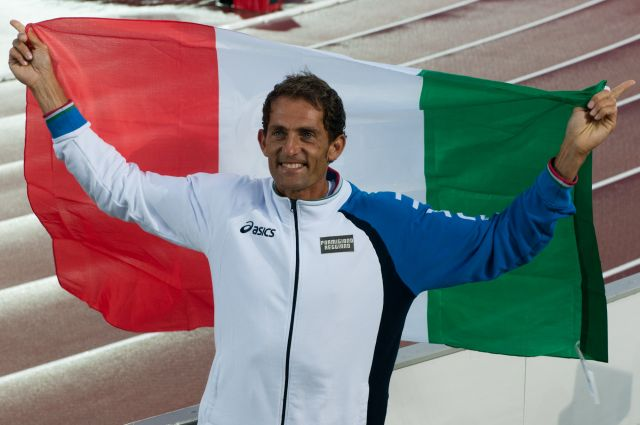
Fabrizio Donato, the most titled male athlete at the indoor European Championships of the Italian team

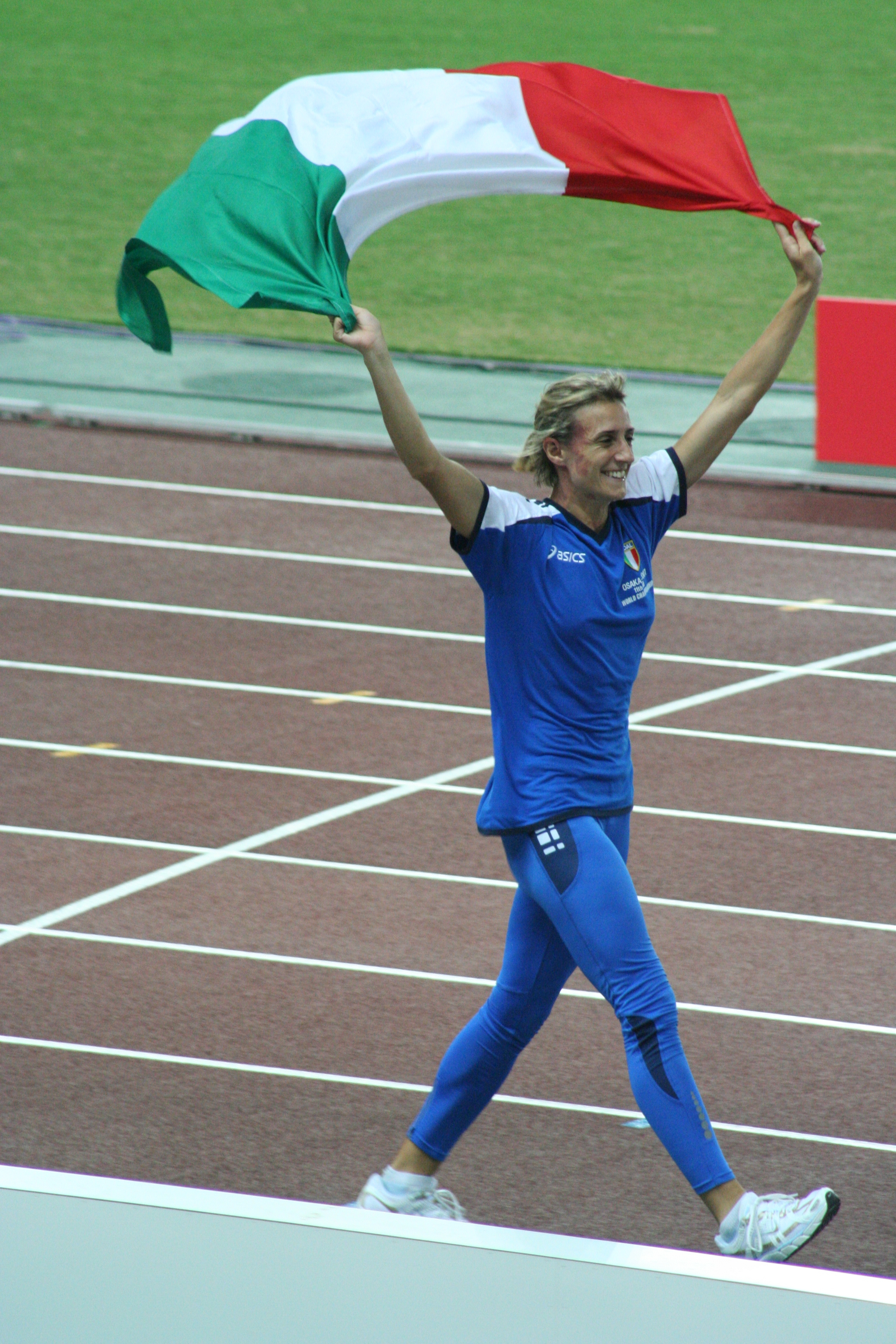
Antonietta Di Martino, one gold and one silver in the high jump

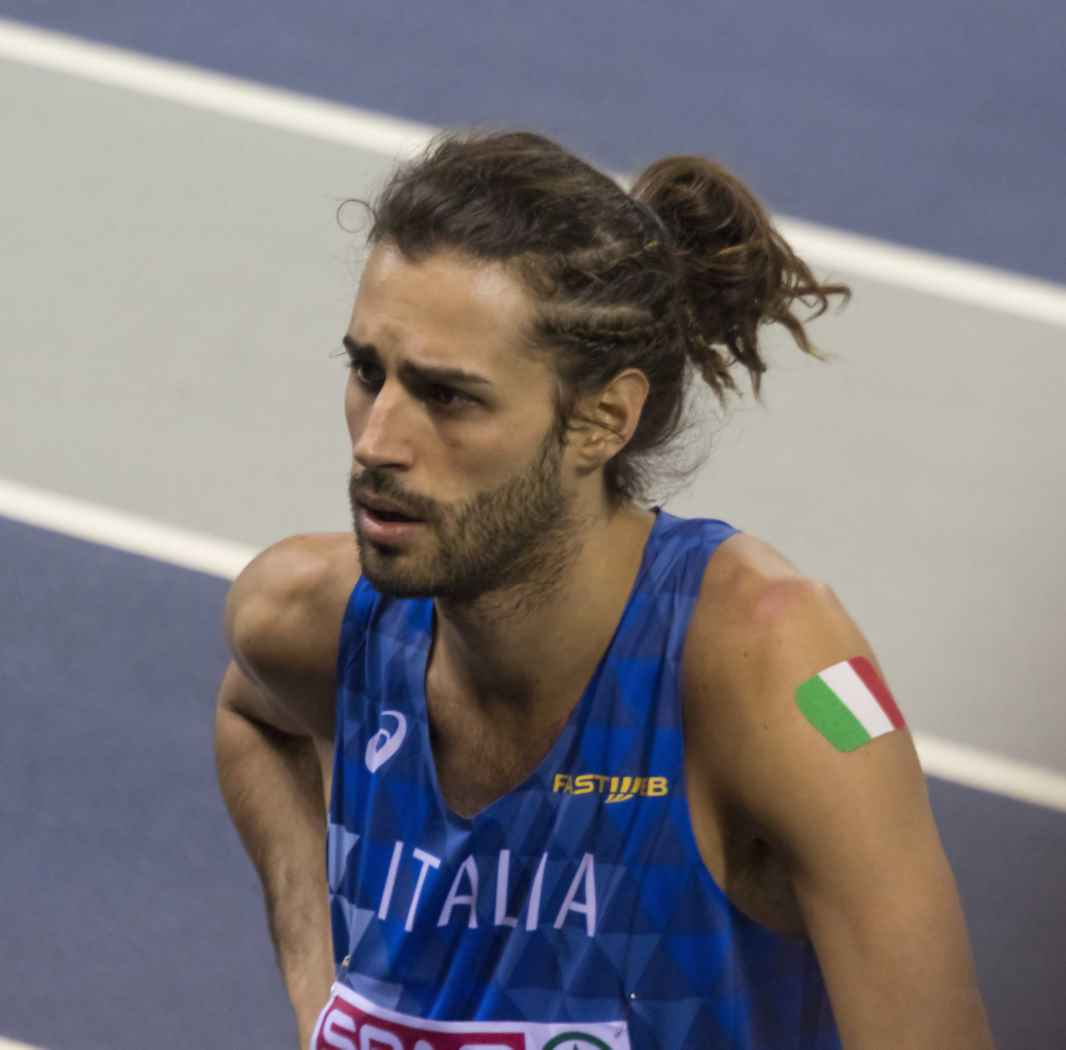
Gimbo Tamberi, one gold and one silver in the high jump

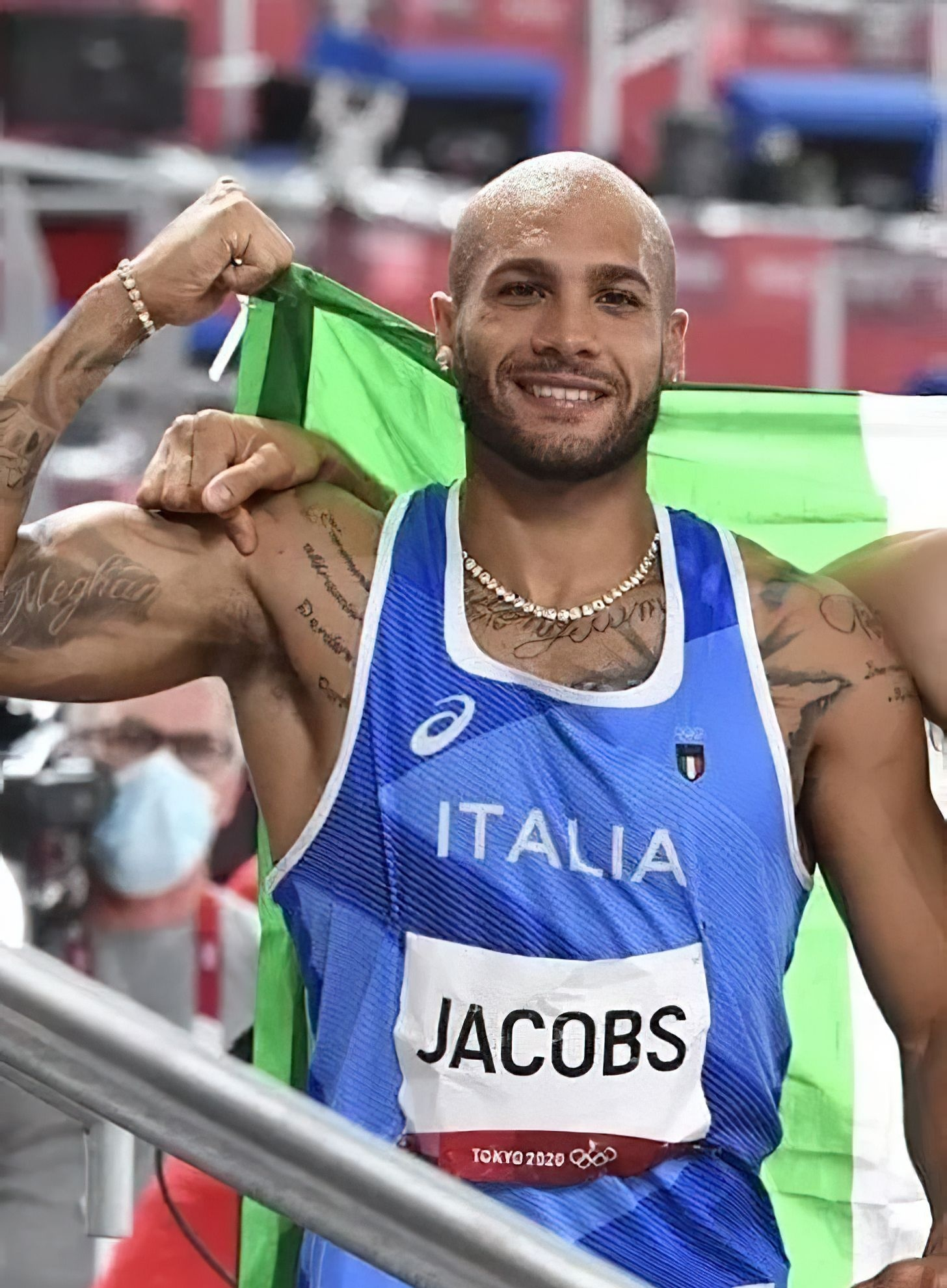
Marcell Jacobs, one gold and one silver in 60 m

== Top eight ==
Incomplete list, to be added first four editions of the European Indoor Games.

| Year | Competitors | | | Men | | | | | | | | | Women | | | | | | | | |
| Year | M | W | Tot | 1st place, gold medalist(s) | 2nd place, silver medalist(s) | 3rd place, bronze medalist(s) | 4 | 5 | 6 | 7 | 8 | Pts | 1st place, gold medalist(s) | 2nd place, silver medalist(s) | 3rd place, bronze medalist(s) | 4 | 5 | 6 | 7 | 8 | Pts |
|---|---|---|---|---|---|---|---|---|---|---|---|---|---|---|---|---|---|---|---|---|---|
| 1970 | 6 | 3 | 9 | – | – | – | – | – | – | 1 | – | 2 | – | – | – | – | – | – | – | – | – |
| 1971 | 7 | 3 | 10 | – | – | 2 | – | – | – | 1 | – | 14 | – | – | – | – | – | 1 | 1 | – | 5 |
| 1972 | 6 | 4 | 10 | – | – | – | – | – | 1 | – | – | 3 | – | – | – | – | – | 1 | – | – | 3 |
| 1973 | 7 | 3 | 10 | 1 | – | – | – | – | 1 | – | 1 | 12 | – | – | – | – | – | – | – | – | – |
| 1973 | 7 | 4 | 11 | – | – | – | – | 2 | – | – | 1 | 9 | – | – | – | – | – | – | – | – | – |
| 1975 | 4 | 3 | 7 | – | – | – | – | – | – | 1 | – | 2 | – | – | – | 1 | 1 | – | – | – | 9 |
| 1976 | 4 | – | 4 | – | – | 1 | 1 | – | 1 | – | – | 14 | – | – | – | – | – | – | – | – | – |
| 1977 | 10 | 3 | 13 | – | – | – | – | 2 | – | 1 | 1 | 11 | 1 | – | 2 | – | – | 1 | – | – | 23 |
| 1978 | 19 | 9 | 28 | 1 | – | 1 | 1 | 2 | 2 | 1 | 1 | 36 | 1 | 1 | – | – | 1 | – | 1 | – | 21 |
| 1979 | 14 | 2 | 16 | – | 1 | – | 1 | 1 | – | 2 | 1 | 21 | – | – | – | 1 | – | – | – | – | 5 |
| 1980 | 12 | 5 | 17 | – | – | – | – | 1 | 2 | – | – | 10 | 1 | – | – | 1 | – | 1 | – | – | 16 |
| 1981 | 13 | 6 | 19 | – | – | 1 | 1 | – | – | – | 1 | 12 | 2 | – | – | – | – | – | – | 1 | 17 |
| 1982 | 26 | 7 | 33 | – | 1 | 3 | 1 | 2 | 1 | 1 | 1 | 44 | 2 | – | – | – | 1 | 1 | 1 | 1 | 26 |
| 1983 | 11 | 5 | 16 | 1 | – | 1 | – | 1 | 1 | – | 1 | 22 | – | 1 | 1 | 1 | – | 1 | – | – | 21 |
| 1984 | 15 | 6 | 21 | 1 | 3 | 1 | – | 2 | – | – | 1 | 44 | – | 1 | 1 | – | 1 | – | – | 1 | 18 |
| 1985 | 17 | 6 | 23 | 1 | – | – | 3 | 3 | 1 | 2 | – | 42 | 1 | – | – | 1 | – | – | – | – | 13 |
| 1986 | 12 | 6 | 18 | – | 2 | 1 | – | – | 1 | 2 | – | 27 | – | – | – | – | – | 1 | – | 1 | 4 |
| 1987 | 19 | 6 | 25 | – | 2 | 1 | – | – | 1 | 2 | – | 27 | – | 1 | – | 1 | – | 1 | – | – | 15 |
| 1988 | 22 | 7 | 29 | – | – | 1 | 1 | 2 | 2 | 2 | – | 29 | – | – | – | 1 | – | – | – | – | 5 |
| 1989 | 13 | 7 | 20 | – | – | 1 | 1 | 1 | 2 | – | 1 | 22 | – | 1 | – | 1 | – | 1 | – | 1 | 16 |
| 1990 | 19 | 11 | 30 | 1 | 2 | – | – | 2 | 1 | 2 | – | 37 | – | 1 | 1 | – | – | – | 1 | 1 | 16 |
| 1992 | 28 | 21 | 49 | 2 | 1 | 1 | 4 | 3 | 3 | 1 | 3 | 75 | – | 1 | – | 1 | – | 1 | 3 | 2 | 23 |
| 1994 | 17 | 12 | 29 | – | – | – | 1 | 1 | 2 | 1 | – | 17 | 1 | – | – | 1 | 2 | – | – | – | 21 |
| 1996 | 12 | 8 | 20 | 1 | 1 | 1 | 1 | – | 1 | – | – | 29 | – | – | – | – | – | – | 1 | – | 2 |
| 1998 | 12 | 10 | 22 | – | 1 | – | – | – | – | 2 | – | 11 | 1 | – | – | – | – | – | – | – | 8 |
| 2000 | 19 | 16 | 35 | – | – | 1 | 1 | – | 2 | 1 | – | 19 | – | 1 | – | – | – | – | – | – | 7 |
| 2002 | 18 | 10 | 28 | – | – | – | 1 | 1 | – | – | 1 | 10 | – | 1 | 1 | – | – | – | 2 | – | 17 |
| 2005 | 11 | 8 | 19 | – | – | – | – | 1 | 1 | – | – | 7 | – | 1 | – | – | 1 | 1 | – | 1 | 15 |
| 2007 | 9 | 8 | 17 | 2 | – | 1 | – | 2 | 1 | – | – | 33 | 1 | 1 | 1 | – | – | – | – | – | 21 |
| 2009 | 20 | 15 | 35 | 2 | 2 | 1 | 1 | – | 3 | – | – | 50 | – | – | 1 | – | 3 | 1 | – | 1 | 22 |
| 2011 | 14 | 13 | 27 | – | 1 | – | 1 | – | 1 | – | 1 | 16 | 2 | – | – | 1 | – | 1 | 1 | – | 26 |
| 2013 | 21 | 18 | 39 | 1 | 1 | 1 | – | 1 | – | – | – | 25 | – | – | 2 | 2 | – | – | 2 | – | 26 |
| 2015 | 11 | 11 | 22 | – | 1 | – | 1 | – | 1 | 1 | – | 17 | – | 1 | 1 | – | – | – | 1 | – | 15 |
| 2017 | 15 | 11 | 26 | – | 1 | – | - | – | 2 | 2 | 1 | 18 | – | - | - | 1 | – | – | 1 | – | 7 |
| 2019 | 14 | 13 | 27 | 1 | - | – | 1 | – | 1 | - | 1 | 17 | – | - | 1 | - | 1 | 1 | - | – | 13 |
| 2021 | | | | | | | | | | | | | | | | | | | | | |
| | 464 | 280 | 725 | 15 | 20 | 20 | 22 | 31 | 35 | 26 | 18 | 794 | 13 | 12 | 12 | 14 | 11 | 14 | 15 | 10 | 456 |

== Oldest competitors ==
Men

- Fabrizio Donato, 42 years 171 days triple jump 2019

Women

- Carla Barbarino, 34 years 291 days (4 × 400 metres relay in 2002)
- Chiara Bazzoni, 34 years, 241 days silver medal (4 × 400 metres relay in 2019)

== See also ==
- Athletics in Italy
- Italy national athletics team
- Italy at the European Athletics Championships
