= Italy at the 1967 European Athletics Indoor Championships =

Italy team at athletics event

- WA code: ITA
- National federation: FIDAL

in (Czechoslovakia) Prague 11 March 1967 – 12 March 1967
- Competitors: 12 (12 men, 0 women)
- Medals Ranked 4th: Gold 2 Silver 0 Bronze 0 Total 2

European Athletics Indoor Championships appearances (overview)
- 1966; 1967; 1968; 1969; 1970; 1971; 1972; 1973; 1974; 1975; 1976; 1977; 1978; 1979; 1980; 1981; 1982; 1983; 1984; 1985; 1986; 1987; 1988; 1989; 1990; 1992; 1994; 1996; 1998; 2000; 2002; 2005; 2007; 2009; 2011; 2013; 2015; 2017; 2019; 2021; 2023

Italy competed at the 1967 European Indoor Games in Prague, Czechoslovakia, from 11 to 12 March 1967.

== Medalists ==
Medal	Athlete	Event
1st place, gold medalist(s)	Pasquale Giannattasio	Men's 50 m
1st place, gold medalist(s)	Eddy Ottoz	Men's 60 m hs

== Top eight ==
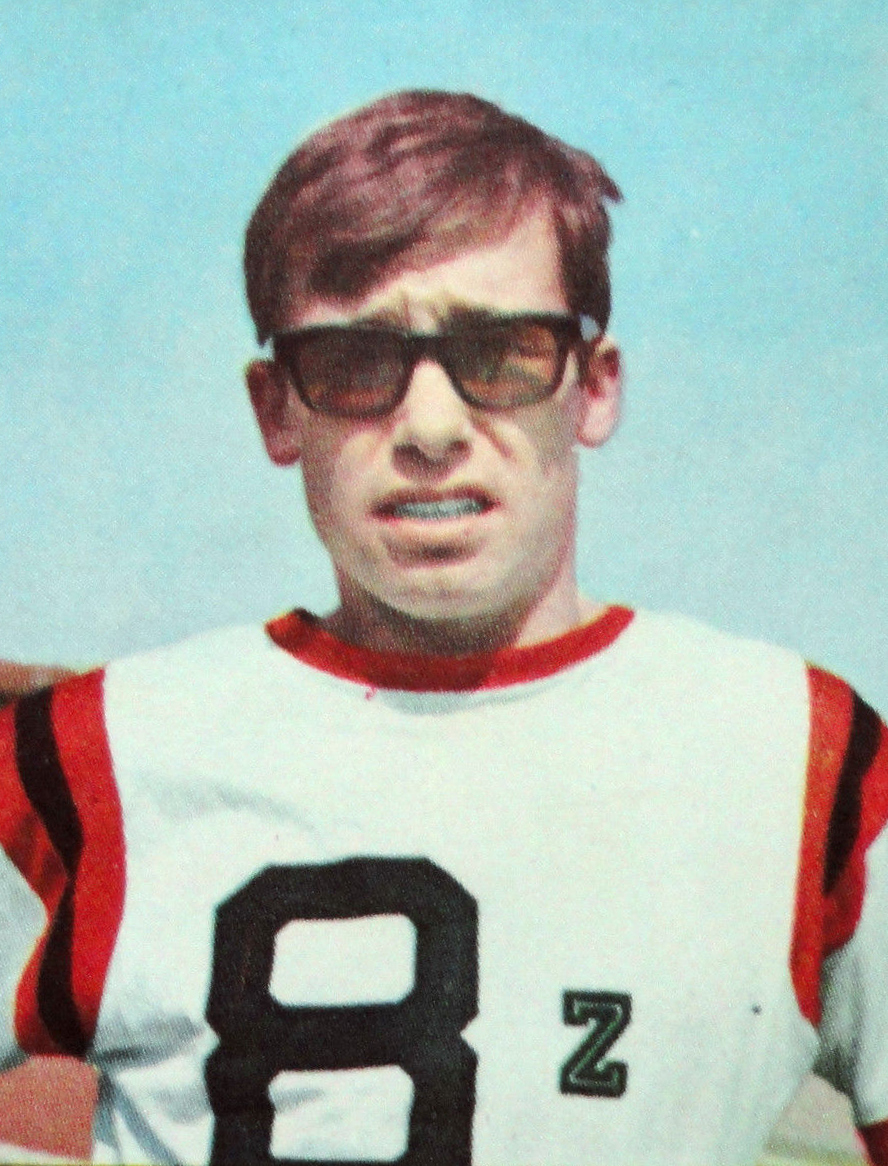
Eddy Ottoz, gold medal in the 50 m hs at the age of 23.

Two Italian athletes reached the top eight in this edition of the championships.

Men

Athlete	50 m	400 m	800 m	1500 m	3000 m	50 m hs	4×300 m relay	Medley relay	3×1000 m relay	High jump	Pole vault	Long jump	Triple jump	Shot put
Pasquale Giannattasio	1st place, gold medalist(s)									5				
Eddy Ottoz						1st place, gold medalist(s)								

Women

In this edition of the championships no women from the Italian national team participated..

== See also ==
- Italy national athletics team
