= Italy at the 1982 European Athletics Indoor Championships =

Italy team at athletics event

- WA code: ITA
- National federation: FIDAL

in (Italy) Milan 6 March 1982 – 7 March 1982
- Competitors: 33 (24 men, 9 women)
- Medals Ranked 4th: Gold 3 Silver 2 Bronze 2 Total 7

European Athletics Indoor Championships appearances (overview)
- 1966; 1967; 1968; 1969; 1970; 1971; 1972; 1973; 1974; 1975; 1976; 1977; 1978; 1979; 1980; 1981; 1982; 1983; 1984; 1985; 1986; 1987; 1988; 1989; 1990; 1992; 1994; 1996; 1998; 2000; 2002; 2005; 2007; 2009; 2011; 2013; 2015; 2017; 2019; 2021; 2023

Italy competed at the 1982 European Athletics Indoor Championships in Milan, Italy, from 6 to 7 March 1982.

== Medalists ==
Medal	Athlete	Event
1st place, gold medalist(s)	Maurizio Damilano	Men's 5000 m racewalk
1st place, gold medalist(s)	Gabriella Dorio	Women's 1500 m
1st place, gold medalist(s)	Agnese Possamai	Women's 3000 m
2nd place, silver medalist(s)	Alberto Cova	Men's 3000 m
2nd place, silver medalist(s)	Carlo Mattioli	Men's 5000 m racewalk
3rd place, bronze medalist(s)	Michele Di Pace	Men's 200 m
3rd place, bronze medalist(s)	Giovanni Evangelisti	Men's long jump

== Top eight ==
18 Italian athletes reached the top eight in this edition of the championships.

Men

Athlete	60 m	200 m	400 m	800 m	1500 m	3000 m	60 m hs	5000 m walk	High jump	Pole vault	Long jump	Triple jump	Shot put
Pierfrancesco Pavoni	4												
Michele Di Pace		3rd place, bronze medalist(s)											
Alberto Cova						2nd place, silver medalist(s)							
Maurizio Damilano								1st place, gold medalist(s)					
Carlo Mattioli								2nd place, silver medalist(s)					
Massimo Di Giorgio									8				
Mauro Barella										7			
Giovanni Evangelisti											3rd place, bronze medalist(s)		
Marco Piochi											6		
Roberto Mazzucato												8	
Alessandro Andrei													5
Marco Montelatici													6

Women

Athlete	60 m	200 m	400 m	800 m	1500 m	3000 m	60 m hs	High jump	Long jump	Shot put
Gabriella Dorio					1st place, gold medalist(s)					
Rossella Gramola					8					
Agnese Possamai						1st place, gold medalist(s)				
Nadia Dandolo						5				
Margherita Gargano						6				
Patrizia Paulotto									7	

== See also ==
- Italy national athletics team
