= Italy at the 1966 European Athletics Indoor Championships =

Italy team at athletics event

- WA code: ITA
- National federation: FIDAL

in (West Germany) Dortmund 27 March 1966 – 27 March 1966
- Competitors: 12 (12 men, 0 women)
- Medals Ranked 7th: Gold 1 Silver 1 Bronze 0 Total 2

European Athletics Indoor Championships appearances (overview)
- 1966; 1967; 1968; 1969; 1970; 1971; 1972; 1973; 1974; 1975; 1976; 1977; 1978; 1979; 1980; 1981; 1982; 1983; 1984; 1985; 1986; 1987; 1988; 1989; 1990; 1992; 1994; 1996; 1998; 2000; 2002; 2005; 2007; 2009; 2011; 2013; 2015; 2017; 2019; 2021; 2023

Italy competed at the 1966 European Indoor Games in Dortmund, West Germany, on 27 March 1966.

== Medalists ==
Medal	Athlete	Event
1st place, gold medalist(s)	Eddy Ottoz	Men's 60 m hs
2nd place, silver medalist(s)	Bruno Bianchi; Sergio Bello; Sergio Ottolina; Ippolito Giani	Men's medley relay

== Top eight ==
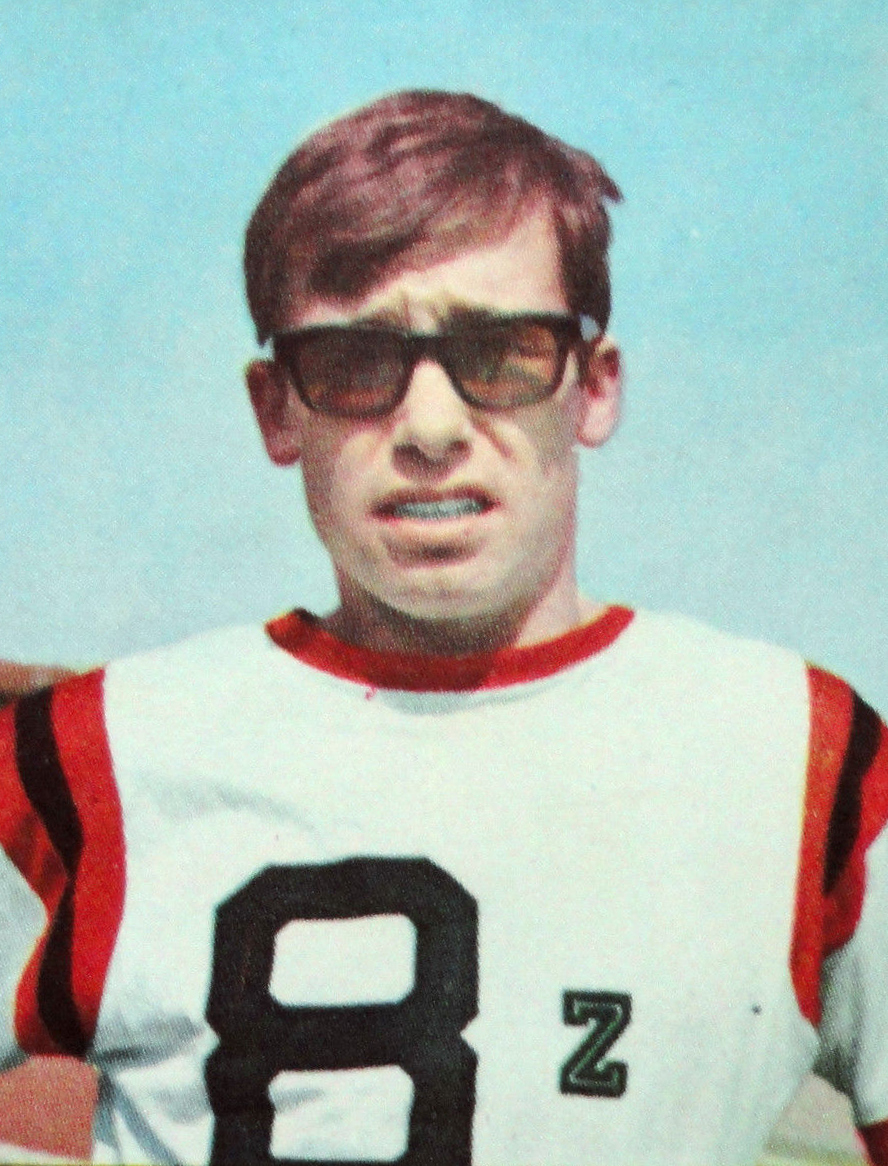
Eddy Ottoz, gold medal in the 60 m hs at the age of 22.

Three Italian athletes and the relay team reached the top eight in this edition of the championships.

Men

Athlete	60 m	400 m	800 m	1500 m	3000 m	60 m hs	4×320 m relay	Medley relay	High jump	Pole vault	Long jump	Triple jump	Shot put
Eddy Ottoz						1st place, gold medalist(s)							
Giovanni Cornacchia						5			5				
Giuseppe Gentile												4	
Relay team Bruno Bianchi; Sergio Bello; Sergio Ottolina; Ippolito Giani								2nd place, silver medalist(s)					

Women

In this edition of the championships no women from the Italian national team participated..

== See also ==
- Italy national athletics team
