= Italy at the 1981 European Athletics Indoor Championships =

Italy team at athletics event

- WA code: ITA
- National federation: FIDAL

in (France) Grenoble 21 February 1981 – 22 February 1981
- Competitors: 19 (16 men, 3 women)
- Medals Ranked 5th: Gold 2 Silver 1 Bronze 1 Total 4

European Athletics Indoor Championships appearances (overview)
- 1966; 1967; 1968; 1969; 1970; 1971; 1972; 1973; 1974; 1975; 1976; 1977; 1978; 1979; 1980; 1981; 1982; 1983; 1984; 1985; 1986; 1987; 1988; 1989; 1990; 1992; 1994; 1996; 1998; 2000; 2002; 2005; 2007; 2009; 2011; 2013; 2015; 2017; 2019; 2021; 2023

Italy competed at the 1981 European Athletics Indoor Championships in Grenoble, France, from 21 to 22 February 1981.

== Medalists ==
| Medal | Athlete | Event |
|---|---|---|
| 1st place, gold medalist(s) | Agnese Possamai | Women's 1500 m |
| 1st place, gold medalist(s) | Sara Simeoni | Women's high jump |
| 2nd place, silver medalist(s) | Maurizio Damilano | Men's 5000 m racewalk |
| 3rd place, bronze medalist(s) | Stefano Malinverni | Men's 400 m |

== Top eight ==
Eight Italian athletes reached the top eight in this edition of the championships.

Men

| Athlete | 50 m | 400 m | 800 m | 1500 m | 3000 m | 50 m hs | 5000 m walk | High jump | Pole vault | Long jump | Triple jump | Shot put |
| Stefano Malinverni | | 3rd place, bronze medalist(s) | | | | | | | | | | |
| Gianni Truschi | | | | 8 | | | | | | | | |
| Maurizio Damilano | | | | | | | 2nd place, silver medalist(s) | | | | | |
| Giorgio Damilano | | | | | | | 4 | | | | | |
| Alessandro Andrei | | | | | | | | | | | | 4 |

Women

| Athlete | 50 m | 400 m | 800 m | 1500 m | 50 m hs | High jump | Long jump | Shot put |
| Agnese Possamai | | | | 1st place, gold medalist(s) | | | | |
| Sara Simeoni | | | | | | 1st place, gold medalist(s) | | |
| Donatella Bulfoni | | | | | | 8 | | |

== See also ==
- Italy national athletics team
