= Italy at the 2019 European Athletics Indoor Championships =

- WA code: ITA

in (United Kingdom) Glasgow 1 March 2019 – 3 March 2019
- Competitors: 27 (14 men, 13 women)
- Medals Ranked 9th: Gold 1 Silver 0 Bronze 1 Total 2

European Athletics Indoor Championships appearances (overview)
- 1966; 1967; 1968; 1969; 1970; 1971; 1972; 1973; 1974; 1975; 1976; 1977; 1978; 1979; 1980; 1981; 1982; 1983; 1984; 1985; 1986; 1987; 1988; 1989; 1990; 1992; 1994; 1996; 1998; 2000; 2002; 2005; 2007; 2009; 2011; 2013; 2015; 2017; 2019; 2021; 2023

Italy competed at the 2019 European Athletics Indoor Championships in Glasgow, United Kingdom, from 1 to 3 March 2019 with 27 athletes.

== Medalists ==
Medal	Athlete	Event
1st place, gold medalist(s)	Gianmarco Tamberi	Men's high jump
3rd place, bronze medalist(s)	Raphaela Lukudo; Ayomide Folorunso; Chiara Bazzoni; Marta Milani	Women's 4 × 400 m relay

== Finalists (top eight) ==
Date	Athlete	Event	Position	Performance	Notes
2 March	Gianmarco Tamberi	Men's high jump	1st	2.32 m	SB =
2 March	Claudio Stecchi	Men's pole vault	4th	5.65 m	
2 March	Raphaela Lukudo	Women's 800 metres	5th	52.48	PB
3 March	Tania Vicenzino	Women's long jump	6th	6.58 m	
3 March	Simone Forte	Men's triple jump	8th	15.54 m	
3 March	Giuseppe Leonardi; Michele Tricca; Brayan Lopez; Vladimir Aceti	Men's 4 × 400 m relay	6th	3:09.48	
3 March	Raphaela Lukudo; Ayomide Folorunso; Chiara Bazzoni; Marta Milani	Women's 4 × 400 m relay	3rd	3:31.90	

== Selected competitors ==
Selected but does not participate

Men (14)
Event (s)	Athlete	Club
400 m and 4x400 m relay	Michele Tricca	G.A. Fiamme Gialle
800 m	Simone Barontini	S.E.F. Stamura Ancona
60 m hs	Lorenzo Perini	C.S. Aeronautica Militare
High jump	Gianmarco Tamberi	G.A. Fiamme Gialle
Pole vault	Claudio Stecchi	G.A. Fiamme Gialle
Long jump	Lamont Marcell Jacobs	G.S. Fiamme Oro Padova
Triple jump	Tobia Bocchi	C.S. Carabinieri
Triple jump	Fabrizio Donato	G.A. Fiamme Gialle
Triple jump	Simone Forte	G.A. Fiamme Gialle
Shot put	Leonardo Fabbri	C.S. Aeronautica Militare / Atletica Firenze Marathon
4x400 m relay	Vladimir Aceti	G.A. Fiamme Gialle / Atletica Vis Nova Giussano
4x400 m relay	Giuseppe Leonardi	C.S. Carabinieri
4x400 m relay	Brayan Lopez	Athletic Club 96 Alperia
4x400 m relay	Mattia Casarico	G.S. Bernatese
Women (13)
Event (s)	Athlete	Club
400 m and 4x400 m relay	Ayomide Folorunso	G.S. Fiamme Oro Padova
400 m and 4x400 m relay	Raphaela Lukudo	C.S. Esercito
3000 m	Margherita Magnani	G.A. Fiamme Gialle
60 m hs	Luminosa Bogliolo	Cus Genova
High jump	Alessia Trost	G.A. Fiamme Gialle
High jump	Elena Vallortigara	C.S. Carabinieri
Pole vault	Sonia Malavisi	G.A. Fiamme Gialle
Long jump	Laura Strati	Atletica Vicentina
Long jump	Tania Vicenzino	C.S. Esercito
4x400 relay	Chiara Bazzoni	C.S. Esercito
4x400 relay	Marta Milani	C.S. Esercito
4x400 relay	Rebecca Borga	G.A. Fiamme Gialle / Atletica Biotekna Marcon
4x400 relay	Virginia Troiani	Cus Pro Patria Milano

== See also ==
- Italy national athletics team
