= Italy at the 1977 European Athletics Indoor Championships =

Italy team at athletics event

- WA code: ITA
- National federation: FIDAL

in (Spain) San Sebastián 12 March 1977 – 13 March 1977
- Competitors: 13 (10 men, 3 women)
- Medals Ranked 7th: Gold 1 Silver 0 Bronze 2 Total 3

European Athletics Indoor Championships appearances (overview)
- 1966; 1967; 1968; 1969; 1970; 1971; 1972; 1973; 1974; 1975; 1976; 1977; 1978; 1979; 1980; 1981; 1982; 1983; 1984; 1985; 1986; 1987; 1988; 1989; 1990; 1992; 1994; 1996; 1998; 2000; 2002; 2005; 2007; 2009; 2011; 2013; 2015; 2017; 2019; 2021; 2023

Italy competed at the 1977 European Athletics Indoor Championships in San Sebastián, Spain, from 12 to 13 March 1977.

== Medalists ==
| Medal | Athlete | Event |
|---|---|---|
| 1st place, gold medalist(s) | Sara Simeoni | Women's high jump |
| 3rd place, bronze medalist(s) | Rita Bottiglieri | Women's 60 m |
| 3rd place, bronze medalist(s) | Rita Bottiglieri | Women's 60 m hs |

== Top eight ==
Seven-time the Italian athletes reached the top eight in this edition of the championships.

Men

| Athlete | 60 m | 400 m | 800 m | 1500 m | 3000 m | 60 m hs | High jump | Pole vault | Long jump | Triple jump | Shot put |
| Bruno Bruni | | | | | | | 5 | | | | |
| Gianni Davito | | | | | | | 8 | | | | |
| Carlo Arrighi | | | | | | | | | 6 | | |
| Roberto Mazzucato | | | | | | | | | | 7 | |

Women

| Athlete | 60 m | 400 m | 800 m | 1500 m | 60 m hs | High jump | Long jump | Shot put |
| Rita Bottiglieri | 3rd place, bronze medalist(s) | | | | 3rd place, bronze medalist(s) | | | |
| Sara Simeoni | | | | | | 1st place, gold medalist(s) | | |

== See also ==
- Italy national athletics team
