= 1984 European Athletics Indoor Championships – Men's 400 metres =

The men's 400 metres event at the 1984 European Athletics Indoor Championships was held on 3 and 4 March.

== Medalists ==
Gold	Silver	Bronze
Sergey Lovachov; Soviet Union	Roberto Tozzi; Italy	Didier Dubois; France

== Results ==
=== Heats ===
First 2 from each heat qualified directly (Q) for the final.

Rank	Heat	Name	Nationality	Time	Notes
1	1	Sergey Lovachov	Soviet Union	47.33	Q
2	1	Didier Dubois	France	47.50	Q
3	2	Roberto Tozzi	Italy	47.55	Q
4	2	Thomas Futterknecht	Austria	47.69	Q
5	2	Ulf Sedlacek	Sweden	47.70	
6	2	Bo Breigan	Norway	48.73	
	1	Athanassios Kaloyannis	Greece	DQ	

=== Final ===
Rank	Name	Nationality	Time	Notes
1st place, gold medalist(s)	Sergey Lovachov	Soviet Union	46.72	NR
2nd place, silver medalist(s)	Roberto Tozzi	Italy	47.01	
3rd place, bronze medalist(s)	Didier Dubois	France	47.29	
4	Thomas Futterknecht	Austria	47.29	
