= 1984 European Athletics Indoor Championships – Men's long jump =

The men's long jump event at the 1984 European Athletics Indoor Championships was held on 4 March.

== Results ==
Rank	Name	Nationality	#1	#2	#3	#4	#5	#6	Result	Notes
1st place, gold medalist(s)	Jan Leitner	Czechoslovakia	x	7.96	x	7.66	7.85	x	7.96	
2nd place, silver medalist(s)	Matthias Koch	East Germany	7.66	7.54	7.91	6.45	6.17	7.87	7.91	
3rd place, bronze medalist(s)	Robert Emmiyan	Soviet Union	7.56	7.26	7.89	x	7.49	7.55	7.89	
4	Marco Piochi	Italy	7.26	7.78	x	7.70	7.82	7.85	7.85	
5	Giovanni Evangelisti	Italy	7.66	7.70	7.82	7.45	–	–	7.82	
6	Zdeněk Hanáček	Czechoslovakia	7.59	7.54	7.60	x	x	7.78	7.78	
7	Markus Keßler	West Germany	7.34	7.56	7.43	7.21	x	7.59	7.59	
8	Anders Hoffström	Sweden	7.37	7.43	7.56	x	x	7.42	7.56	
9	Oganes Stepanyan	Soviet Union	7.20	6.94	7.53				7.53	
10	Ján Čado	Czechoslovakia	x	7.48	7.47				7.48	
11	Philippe Deroche	France	7.30	7.48	7.33				7.48	
12	Derrick Brown	Great Britain	7.31	7.10	7.33				7.33	
13	Einar Sagli	Norway	x	7.24	x				7.24	
