= Italy at the 1979 European Athletics Indoor Championships =

Italy team at athletics event

- WA code: ITA
- National federation: FIDAL

in (Austria) Vienna 24 February 1979 – 25 February 1979
- Competitors: 16 (14 men, 2 women)
- Medals Ranked 14th: Gold 0 Silver 1 Bronze 0 Total 1

European Athletics Indoor Championships appearances (overview)
- 1966; 1967; 1968; 1969; 1970; 1971; 1972; 1973; 1974; 1975; 1976; 1977; 1978; 1979; 1980; 1981; 1982; 1983; 1984; 1985; 1986; 1987; 1988; 1989; 1990; 1992; 1994; 1996; 1998; 2000; 2002; 2005; 2007; 2009; 2011; 2013; 2015; 2017; 2019; 2021; 2023

Italy competed at the 1979 European Athletics Indoor Championships in Vienna, Austria, from 24 to 25 February 1979.

== Medalists ==
Medal	Athlete	Event
2nd place, silver medalist(s)	Stefano Malinverni	Men's 400 m

== Top eight ==
Seven Italian athletes reached the top eight in this edition of the championships.

Men

Athlete	60 m	400 m	800 m	1500 m	3000 m	60 m hs	High jump	Pole vault	Long jump	Triple jump	Shot put
Stefano Malinverni		2nd place, silver medalist(s)									
Carlo Grippo			4								
Mariano Scartezzini					8						
Bruno Bruni							5				
Marco Piochi									7		
Roberto Mazzucato										7	

Women

Athlete	60 m	400 m	800 m	1500 m	60 m hs	High jump	Long jump	Shot put
Alessandra Fossati						4		

== See also ==
- Italy national athletics team
