= Italy at the 2021 European Athletics Indoor Championships =

- WA code: ITA

in (Poland) Toruń 5 March 2021 – 7 March 2021
- Competitors: 43 (22 men, 21 women)
- Medals Ranked 12th: Gold 1 Silver 1 Bronze 1 Total 3

European Athletics Indoor Championships appearances (overview)
- 1966; 1967; 1968; 1969; 1970; 1971; 1972; 1973; 1974; 1975; 1976; 1977; 1978; 1979; 1980; 1981; 1982; 1983; 1984; 1985; 1986; 1987; 1988; 1989; 1990; 1992; 1994; 1996; 1998; 2000; 2002; 2005; 2007; 2009; 2011; 2013; 2015; 2017; 2019; 2021; 2023

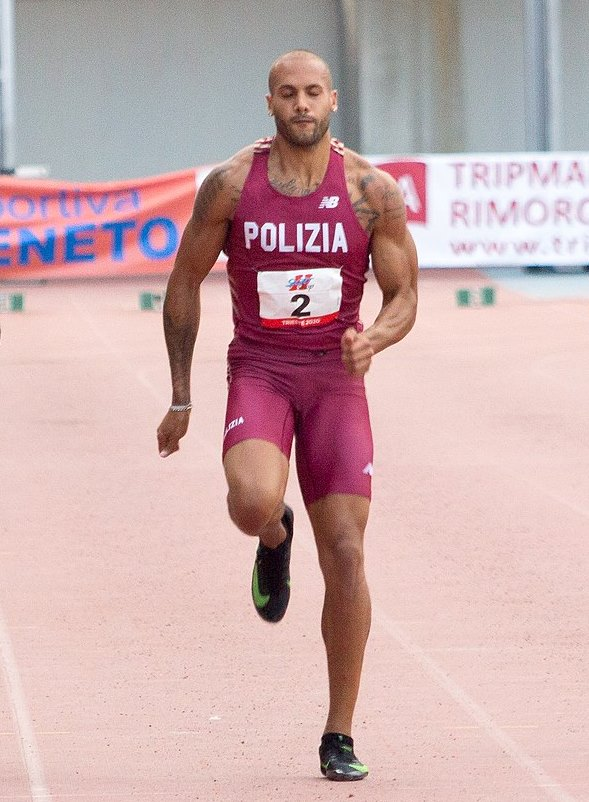
Marcell Jacobs, gold medal in 60 metres.

Italy competed at the 2021 European Athletics Indoor Championships in Toruń, Poland, from 5 to 7 March 2021 with 44 athletes.

== Medalists ==
Medal	Athlete	Event
1st place, gold medalist(s)	Marcell Jacobs	Men's 60 m
2nd place, silver medalist(s)	Gianmarco Tamberi	Men's high jump
3rd place, bronze medalist(s)	Paolo Dal Molin	Men's 60 m hs

== Finalists (top eight) ==
Twelve was the Italian finalists at this edition of the European Athletics Indoor Championships, six men and four women and the two relays team.

== Selected competitors ==
Selected but does not participate
Finished in top 8

=== Men (22) ===
Event (s)	Athlete	Club	Result
60 m	Chituru Ali	G.A. Fiamme Gialle / CUS Insubria VaCo	Semifinal
60 m	Marcell Jacobs	G.S. Fiamme Oro Padova	1st place, gold medalist(s)
60 m	Luca Lai	Athletic Club 96	did not advance to the semifinal
400 m	Vladimir Aceti	G.A. Fiamme Gialle	Semifinal
400 m	Lorenzo Benati	Atl. Roma Acquacetosa	did not advance to the semifinal
4x400 m relay	Vladimir Aceti; Robert Charles Grant; Edoardo Scotti; Brayan Lopez	Athletic Club 96; C.S. Carabinieri /CUS Parma; Athletic Club 96	5th
800 m	Gabriele Aquaro	Team-A Lombardia	did not advance to the semifinal
800 m	Simone Barontini	G.S. Fiamme Azzurre / S.E.F. Stamura AN	Semifinal
1500 m	Pietro Arese	G.A. Fiamme Gialle / S.A.F. Atl. Piemonte	did not advance to the final
1500 m	Joao C. M. Bussotti N.J.	C.S. Esercito	did not advance to the final
1500 m	Federico Riva	Fiamme Gialle / G. Simoni	did not advance to the final
3000m	Yassin Bouih	G.A. Fiamme Gialle	did not advance to the final
60 m hs	Paolo Dal Molin	G.S. Fiamme Oro Padova	3rd place, bronze medalist(s)
60 m hs	Hassane Fofana	G.S. Fiamme Oro Padova	Semifinal
60 m hs	Franck Brice Koua	Cus Pro Patria Milano	8th
High jump	Gianmarco Tamberi	Atl-Etica San Vendemiano	2nd place, silver medalist(s)
Long jump	Antonino Trio	Athletic Club 96	did not advance to the final
Triple jump	Tobia Bocchi	C.S. Carabinieri Sez. Atletica	4th
Shot put	Leonardo Fabbri	C.S. Aeronautica Militare	did not advance to the final
Heptathlon	Dario Dester	C.S. Carabinieri Sez. Atl. / CR S. Atl. Arvedi	7th

=== Women (22) ===
Event (s)	Athlete	Club	Result
60 m	Vittoria Fontana	C.S. Carabinieri Sez. Atl. / Atletica Fanfulla	Semifinal
60 m	Irene Siragusa	C.S. Esercito	did not advance to the semifinal
400 m	Rebecca Borga	G.A. Fiamme Gialle	Semifinal
400 m	Alice Mangione	C.S. Esercito / Atletica Brescia 1950	did not advance to the semifinal
400 m	Eleonora Marchiando	Atletica Sandro Calvesi	did not advance to the semifinal
4x400 m relay	Rebecca Borga; Alice Mangione; Eleonora Marchiando; Eloisa Coiro	G.S. Fiamme Azzurre	4th
4x400	Anna Polinari	Atletica Brescia 1950	
800 m	Irene Baldessari	C.S. Esercito	Semifinal
800 m	Elena Bellò	G.S. Fiamme Azzurre	Semifinal
800 m	Eleonora Vandi	Atl. Avis Macerata	Semifinal
1500 m	Federica Del Buono	C.S. Carabinieri Sez. Atletica	did not advance to the final
1500 m	Gaia Sabbatini	G.S. Fiamme Azzurre / Atl. Gran Sasso Teramo	did not advance to the final
3000 m	Giulia Aprile	C.S. Esercito	did not advance to the final
3000 m	Ludovica Cavalli	Bracco Atletica	did not advance to the final
60hs	Luminosa Bogliolo	G.S. Fiamme Oro Padova / CUS Genova	6th
60hs	Elisa Maria Di Lazzaro	C.S. Carabinieri Sez. Atletica	Semifinal
High jump	Alessia Trost	G.A. Fiamme Gialle	6th
High jump	Elena Vallortigara	C.S. Carabinieri Sez. Atletica	did not advance to the final
Long jump	Larissa Iapichino	G.A. Fiamme Gialle / Atl. Firenze Marathon S.S.	5th
Long jump	Laura Strati	Atl. Vicentina	6th
Triple jump	Ottavia Cestonaro	C.S. Carabinieri Sez. Atletica	did not advance to the final
Shot put	Chiara Rosa	G.S. Fiamme Azzurre	did not advance to the final

== See also ==
- Italy national athletics team
