= Italy at the 1983 European Athletics Indoor Championships =

Italy team at athletics event

- WA code: ITA
- National federation: FIDAL

in (Hungary) Budapest 5 March 1983 – 6 March 1983
- Competitors: 16 (11 men, 5 women)
- Medals Ranked 5th: Gold 1 Silver 1 Bronze 2 Total 4

European Athletics Indoor Championships appearances (overview)
- 1966; 1967; 1968; 1969; 1970; 1971; 1972; 1973; 1974; 1975; 1976; 1977; 1978; 1979; 1980; 1981; 1982; 1983; 1984; 1985; 1986; 1987; 1988; 1989; 1990; 1992; 1994; 1996; 1998; 2000; 2002; 2005; 2007; 2009; 2011; 2013; 2015; 2017; 2019; 2021; 2023

Italy competed at the 1983 European Athletics Indoor Championships in Budapest, Hungary, from 5 to 6 March 1983.

== Medalists ==
Medal	Athlete	Event
1st place, gold medalist(s)	Stefano Tilli	Men's 60 m
2nd place, silver medalist(s)	Agnese Possamai	Women's 3000 m
3rd place, bronze medalist(s)	Massimo Di Giorgio	Men's high jump
3rd place, bronze medalist(s)	Marisa Masullo	Women's 60 m

== Top eight ==
Nine Italian athletes reached the top eight in this edition of the championships.

Men

Athlete	60 m	200 m	400 m	800 m	1500 m	3000 m	60 m hs	5000 m walk	High jump	Pole vault	Long jump	Triple jump	Shot put
Stefano Tilli	1st place, gold medalist(s)												
Claudio Patrignani					5								
Massimo Di Giorgio									3rd place, bronze medalist(s)				
Dario Badinelli												6	
Roberto Mazzucato												8	

Women

Athlete	60 m	200 m	400 m	800 m	1500 m	3000 m	60 m hs	High jump	Long jump	Shot put
Marisa Masullo	3rd place, bronze medalist(s)									
Gabriella Dorio					4					
Agnese Possamai						2nd place, silver medalist(s)				
Margherita Gargano						6				

== See also ==
- Italy national athletics team
