= Italy at the 1971 European Athletics Indoor Championships =

Italy team at athletics event

- WA code: ITA
- National federation: FIDAL

in (Bulgaria) Sofia 13 March 1971 – 14 March 1971
- Competitors: 10 (7 men. 3 women)
- Medals Ranked 12th: Gold 0 Silver 0 Bronze 2 Total 2

European Athletics Indoor Championships appearances (overview)
- 1966; 1967; 1968; 1969; 1970; 1971; 1972; 1973; 1974; 1975; 1976; 1977; 1978; 1979; 1980; 1981; 1982; 1983; 1984; 1985; 1986; 1987; 1988; 1989; 1990; 1992; 1994; 1996; 1998; 2000; 2002; 2005; 2007; 2009; 2011; 2013; 2015; 2017; 2019; 2021; 2023

Italy competed at the 1971 European Athletics Indoor Championships in Sofia, Bulgaria, from 13 to 14 March 1971.

== Medalists ==
Medal	Athlete	Event
3rd place, bronze medalist(s)	Gianni Del Buono	Men's 1500 m
3rd place, bronze medalist(s)	Sergio Liani	Men's 60 m hs

== Top eight ==
Five Italian athletes reached the top eight in this edition of the championships.

Men

Athlete	60 m	400 m	800 m	1500 m	3000 m	60 m hs	4×400 m relay	4×800 m relay	High jump	Pole vault	Long jump	Triple jump	Shot put
Gianni Del Buono				3rd place, bronze medalist(s)									
Giuseppe Cindolo					7								
Sergio Liani						3rd place, bronze medalist(s)							

Women

Athlete	60 m	400 m	800 m	1500 m	60 m hs	4×200 m relay	4×400 m relay	High jump	Long jump	Shot put
Donata Govoni			6							
Angela Ramello				7						

== See also ==
- Italy national athletics team
