= Italy at the 1972 European Athletics Indoor Championships =

Italy team at athletics event

- WA code: ITA
- National federation: FIDAL

in (France) Grenoble 11 March 1972 – 12 March 1972
- Competitors: 11 (7 men. 4 women)
- Medals Ranked -th: Gold 0 Silver 0 Bronze 0 Total 0

European Athletics Indoor Championships appearances (overview)
- 1966; 1967; 1968; 1969; 1970; 1971; 1972; 1973; 1974; 1975; 1976; 1977; 1978; 1979; 1980; 1981; 1982; 1983; 1984; 1985; 1986; 1987; 1988; 1989; 1990; 1992; 1994; 1996; 1998; 2000; 2002; 2005; 2007; 2009; 2011; 2013; 2015; 2017; 2019; 2021; 2023

Italy competed at the 1972 European Athletics Indoor Championships in Grenoble, France, from 11 to 12 March 1972.

== Medalists ==
In this edition of the championships, Italy did not win any medals.

== Top eight ==
Two Italian athletes reached the top eight in this edition of the championships.

Men

Athlete	50 m	400 m	800 m	1500 m	3000 m	50 m hs	4×360 m relay	4×720 m relay	High jump	Pole vault	Long jump	Triple jump	Shot put
Renzo Finelli					6								

Women

Athlete	50 m	400 m	800 m	1500 m	50 m hs	4×180 m relay	4×360 m relay	High jump	Long jump	Shot put
Donata Govoni			6							

== See also ==
- Italy national athletics team
