= 1984 European Athletics Indoor Championships – Women's shot put =

The women's shot put event at the 1984 European Athletics Indoor Championships was held on 3 March.

== Results ==
| Rank | Name | Nationality | #1 | #2 | #3 | #4 | #5 | #6 | Result | Notes |
|---|---|---|---|---|---|---|---|---|---|---|
| 1st place, gold medalist(s) | Helena Fibingerová | Czechoslovakia | x | 20.15 | x | 19.83 | 20.34 | x | 20.34 | |
| 2nd place, silver medalist(s) | Claudia Losch | West Germany | 20.23 | 19.39 | x | 18.85 | 19.31 | x | 20.23 | |
| 3rd place, bronze medalist(s) | Heidi Krieger | East Germany | 18.63 | 19.85 | 20.18 | 19.97 | 19.81 | x | 20.18 | |
| 4 | Nunu Abashidze | Soviet Union | 19.68 | 19.94 | x | 20.03 | 19.80 | x | 20.03 | |
| 5 | Mihaela Loghin | Romania | 19.58 | x | 19.74 | x | 19.42 | 19.76 | 19.76 | |
| 6 | Heike Dittrich | East Germany | 18.18 | 18.74 | 19.26 | x | x | 19.50 | 19.50 | |
| 7 | Birgit Petsch | West Germany | 16.07 | x | 17.03 | 16.93 | 17.41 | x | 17.41 | |
| 8 | Simone Créantor | France | 15.98 | 16.29 | x | x | x | – | 16.29 | |
