= Italy at the 1978 European Athletics Indoor Championships =

Italy team at athletics event

- WA code: ITA
- National federation: FIDAL

in (Italy) Milan 11 March 1978 – 12 March 1978
- Competitors: 28 (19 men, 9 women)
- Medals Ranked 4th: Gold 2 Silver 1 Bronze 1 Total 4

European Athletics Indoor Championships appearances (overview)
- 1966; 1967; 1968; 1969; 1970; 1971; 1972; 1973; 1974; 1975; 1976; 1977; 1978; 1979; 1980; 1981; 1982; 1983; 1984; 1985; 1986; 1987; 1988; 1989; 1990; 1992; 1994; 1996; 1998; 2000; 2002; 2005; 2007; 2009; 2011; 2013; 2015; 2017; 2019; 2021; 2023

Italy competed at the 1978 European Athletics Indoor Championships in Milan, Italy, from 11 to 12 March 1978.

== Medalists ==
Medal	Athlete	Event
1st place, gold medalist(s)	Pietro Mennea	Men's 400 m
1st place, gold medalist(s)	Sara Simeoni	Women's high jump
2nd place, silver medalist(s)	Rita Bottiglieri	Women's 400 m
3rd place, bronze medalist(s)	Giuseppe Buttari	Men's 60 m hs

== Top eight ==
13 Italian athletes reached the top eight in this edition of the championships.

Men

Athlete	60 m	400 m	800 m	1500 m	3000 m	60 m hs	High jump	Pole vault	Long jump	Triple jump	Shot put
Giovanni Grazioli	5										
Pietro Mennea		1st place, gold medalist(s)									
Gabriele Ferrero			6								
Venanzio Ortis					8						
Giuseppe Buttari						3rd place, bronze medalist(s)					
Oscar Raise							6				
Carlo Arrighi									4		
Paolo Piapan										5	
Marco Montelatici											7

Women

Athlete	60 m	400 m	800 m	1500 m	60 m hs	High jump	Long jump	Shot put
Rita Bottiglieri		2nd place, silver medalist(s)						
Silvana Cruciata				5				
Sara Simeoni						1st place, gold medalist(s)		
Cinzia Petrucci								7

== See also ==
- Italy national athletics team
