= Italy at the 1975 European Athletics Indoor Championships =

Italy team at athletics event

- WA code: ITA
- National federation: FIDAL

in (Poland) Katowice 9 March 1975 – 10 March 1975
- Competitors: 7 (4 men, 3 women)
- Medals Ranked -th: Gold 0 Silver 0 Bronze 0 Total 0

European Athletics Indoor Championships appearances (overview)
- 1966; 1967; 1968; 1969; 1970; 1971; 1972; 1973; 1974; 1975; 1976; 1977; 1978; 1979; 1980; 1981; 1982; 1983; 1984; 1985; 1986; 1987; 1988; 1989; 1990; 1992; 1994; 1996; 1998; 2000; 2002; 2005; 2007; 2009; 2011; 2013; 2015; 2017; 2019; 2021; 2023

Italy competed at the 1975 European Athletics Indoor Championships in Katowice, Poland, from 8 to 9 March 1975.

== Medalists ==
In this edition of the championships, Italy did not win any medals.

== Top eight ==
Three Italian athletes reached the top eight in this edition of the championships.

Men

Athlete	60 m	400 m	800 m	1500 m	3000 m	60 m hs	4×320 m relay	High jump	Pole vault	Long jump	Triple jump	Shot put
Giordano Ferrari								7				

Women

Athlete	60 m	400 m	800 m	1500 m	60 m hs	4×320 m relay	High jump	Long jump	Shot put
Rita Bottiglieri	5								
Sara Simeoni							4		

== See also ==
- Italy national athletics team
