= 1982 European Athletics Indoor Championships – Women's shot put =

The women's shot put event at the 1982 European Athletics Indoor Championships was held on 6 March.

== Results ==
Rank	Name	Nationality	Results	Notes
1st place, gold medalist(s)	Verzhiniya Veselinova	Bulgaria	20.19	
2nd place, silver medalist(s)	Helena Fibingerová	Czechoslovakia	19.24	
3rd place, bronze medalist(s)	Natalya Lisovskaya	Soviet Union	18.50	
4	Soultana Saroudi	Greece	17.52	
5	Simone Créantor	France	16.79	
6	Léone Bertimon	France	16.33	
7	Birgit Petsch	West Germany	16.31	
