= Italy at the 1980 European Athletics Indoor Championships =

Italy team at athletics event

- WA code: ITA
- National federation: FIDAL

in (Austria) Sindelfingen 1 February 1980 – 2 February 1980
- Competitors: 17 (12 men, 5 women)
- Medals Ranked 8th: Gold 1 Silver 0 Bronze 0 Total 1

European Athletics Indoor Championships appearances (overview)
- 1966; 1967; 1968; 1969; 1970; 1971; 1972; 1973; 1974; 1975; 1976; 1977; 1978; 1979; 1980; 1981; 1982; 1983; 1984; 1985; 1986; 1987; 1988; 1989; 1990; 1992; 1994; 1996; 1998; 2000; 2002; 2005; 2007; 2009; 2011; 2013; 2015; 2017; 2019; 2021; 2023

Italy competed at the 1980 European Athletics Indoor Championships in Sindelfingen, West Germany, from 1 to 2 March 1980.

== Medalists ==
Medal	Athlete	Event
1st place, gold medalist(s)	Sara Simeoni	Women's high jump

== Top eight ==
Six Italian athletes reached the top eight in this edition of the championships.

Men

Athlete	60 m	400 m	800 m	1500 m	3000 m	60 m hs	High jump	Pole vault	Long jump	Triple jump	Shot put
Gianfranco Lazzer	6										
Fulvio Costa					6						
Marco Tamberi							5				

Women

Athlete	60 m	400 m	800 m	1500 m	60 m hs	High jump	Long jump	Shot put
Sara Simeoni						1st place, gold medalist(s)		
Alessandra Fossati						6		
Cinzia Petrucci								4

== See also ==
- Italy national athletics team
