= 1968 European Indoor Games – Men's 3 × 1000 metres relay =

The men's 3 × 1000 metres relay event at the 1968 European Indoor Games was held on 10 March in Madrid.

== Results ==
| Rank | Nation | Competitors | Time | Notes |
|---|---|---|---|---|
| 1st place, gold medalist(s) | Soviet Union | Mikhail Zhelobovskiy; Oleg Rayko; Anatoliy Verlan | 7:13.6 | |
| 2nd place, silver medalist(s) | Spain | Alberto Estebán; Enrique Bondia; Virgilio González | 7:23.6 | |
| 3rd place, bronze medalist(s) | Czechoslovakia | Pavel Hruška; Ján Kasal; Miroslav Jůza | 7:40.2 | |
