= Italy at the 2017 European Athletics Indoor Championships =

- WA code: ITA

in (Serbia) Belgrade 3 March 2017 – 5 March 2017
- Medals Ranked 18th: Gold 0 Silver 1 Bronze 0 Total 1

European Athletics Indoor Championships appearances (overview)
- 1966; 1967; 1968; 1969; 1970; 1971; 1972; 1973; 1974; 1975; 1976; 1977; 1978; 1979; 1980; 1981; 1982; 1983; 1984; 1985; 1986; 1987; 1988; 1989; 1990; 1992; 1994; 1996; 1998; 2000; 2002; 2005; 2007; 2009; 2011; 2013; 2015; 2017; 2019; 2021; 2023

Italy competed at the 2017 European Athletics Indoor Championships in Belgrade, Serbia, from 3 to 5 March 2017.

== Medalists ==
Medal	Athlete	Event
2nd place, silver medalist(s)	Fabrizio Donato	Men's triple jump

== Other finalists (7) ==
- 4th: Women's 4 × 400 m relay (Lucia Pasquale, Maria Enrica Spacca, Maria Benedicta Chigbolu, Ayomide Folorunso) 3:32.87
- 6th: Marouan Razine (3000m) 8:04.19 final, 7:55.17 heats
- 6th: Silvano Chesani (high jump) 2.27 final, 2.28 qual.
- 7th: Yeman Crippa (3000m) 8:05.63 final, 7:59.76 heats
- 7th: Filippo Randazzo (long jump) 7.77 final, 7.89 qual.
- 7th: Giulia Viola (3000m) 8:56.19 PB final, 8:57.86 batt.
- 8th: Yassin Bouih (1500m) 3:47.95 final, 3:44.67 batt.

== Personal Bests ==
- Simone Cairoli 5841 (eptathlon); 7.55 (long jump); 4.60 (pole vault)
- Giulia Viola 8:56.19 (3000m)

== Other Season Bests ==
- Silvano Chesani 2.28 (high jump)
- Fabrizio Donato 17.13 (triple jump)
- Simone Cairoli 8.31 (60hs)
- Gloria Hooper 7.34 (60m)

== See also ==
- Italy national athletics team
