= 1981 European Athletics Indoor Championships – Women's 1500 metres =

The women's 1500 metres event at the 1981 European Athletics Indoor Championships was held on 22 February.

== Results ==
Rank	Name	Nationality	Time	Notes
1st place, gold medalist(s)	Agnese Possamai	Italy	4:07.49	
2nd place, silver medalist(s)	Valentina Ilyinykh	Soviet Union	4:08.17	
3rd place, bronze medalist(s)	Lyubov Smolka	Soviet Union	4:08.64	
4	Vanya Gospodinova	Bulgaria	4:10.13	
5	Dorthe Rasmussen	Denmark	4:16.50	
6	Gillian Dainty	Great Britain	4:25.34	
	Joëlle Debrouwer	France	DNF	
