= 1967 European Indoor Games – Men's 1500 metres =

The men's 1500 metres event at the 1967 European Indoor Games was held on 11 March in Prague.

== Results ==
Rank	Name	Nationality	Time	Notes
1st place, gold medalist(s)	John Whetton	Great Britain	3:48.7	
2nd place, silver medalist(s)	Josef Odložil	Czechoslovakia	3:49.6	
3rd place, bronze medalist(s)	Stanislav Hoffman	Czechoslovakia	3:50.5	
4	Wolf Schulte-Hillen	West Germany	3:50.7	
5	Edgard Salvé	Belgium	3:53.0	
6	Stanislav Simbirtsev	Soviet Union	3:55.9	
	Kenth Andersson	Sweden	DQ	
