= 1966 European Indoor Games – Men's 1500 metres =

The men's 1500 metres event at the 1966 European Indoor Games was held on 27 March in Dortmund.

== Results ==
Rank	Name	Nationality	Time	Notes
1st place, gold medalist(s)	John Whetton	Great Britain	3:43.8	
2nd place, silver medalist(s)	Oleg Raiko	Soviet Union	3:46.7	
3rd place, bronze medalist(s)	Ulf Högberg	Sweden	3:47.2	
4	Karl Eyerkaufer	West Germany	3:47.3	
5	Klaus Prenner	West Germany	3:48.3	
6	Francesco Bianchi	Italy	3:49.9	
7	Claude Damoiseaux	Belgium	3:57.5	
8	Jorge González	Spain	4:06.4	
