= 1971 European Athletics Indoor Championships – Men's 3000 metres =

The men's 3000 metres event at the 1971 European Athletics Indoor Championships was held on 13 and 14 March in Sofia.

== Medalists ==
| Gold | Silver | Bronze |
|---|---|---|
| Peter Stewart; Great Britain | Wilfried Scholz; East Germany | Yuriy Aleksashin; Soviet Union |

== Results ==
=== Heats ===
Held on 13 March

First 4 from each heat (Q) qualified directly for the final.

| Rank | Heat | Name | Nationality | Time | Notes |
|---|---|---|---|---|---|
| 1 | 1 | Wilfried Scholz | East Germany | 8:00.9 | Q |
| 2 | 1 | Yuriy Aleksashin | Soviet Union | 8:02.2 | Q |
| 3 | 1 | Egbert Nijstadt | Netherlands | 8:05.8 | Q |
| 4 | 1 | Lajos Mecser | Hungary | 8:07.1 | Q |
| 5 | 1 | Rune Holmén | Finland | 8:11.5 | |
| 6 | 1 | Petko Yordanov | Bulgaria | 8:19.8 | |
| 7 | 1 | Gaetano Pusterla | Italy | 8:20.4 | |
| 8 | 1 | Edgard Salvé | Belgium | 8:52.0 | |
| 1 | 2 | Giuseppe Cindolo | Italy | 8:19.5 | Q |
| 2 | 2 | Peter Stewart | Great Britain | 8:19.6 | Q |
| 3 | 2 | Anatoliy Verlan | Soviet Union | 8:20.5 | Q |
| 4 | 2 | Gérard Vervoort | France | 8:20.8 | Q |
| 5 | 2 | Toni Feldmann | Switzerland | 8:21.2 | |
| 6 | 2 | Paul Angenvoorth | West Germany | 8:23.8 | |
| 7 | 2 | Stanisław Podzoba | Poland | 8:27.5 | |

=== Final ===
Held on 14 March

| Rank | Name | Nationality | Time | Notes |
|---|---|---|---|---|
| 1st place, gold medalist(s) | Peter Stewart | Great Britain | 7:53.6 | |
| 2nd place, silver medalist(s) | Wilfried Scholz | East Germany | 7:54.4 | |
| 3rd place, bronze medalist(s) | Yuriy Aleksashin | Soviet Union | 8:01.2 | |
| 4 | Anatoliy Verlan | Soviet Union | 8:05.0 | |
| 5 | Lajos Mecser | Hungary | 8:06.2 | |
| 6 | Egbert Nijstadt | Netherlands | 8:13.6 | |
| 7 | Giuseppe Cindolo | Italy | 8:22.6 | |
| 8 | Gérard Vervoort | France | 8:24.8 | |
