= Italy at the 1976 European Athletics Indoor Championships =

Italy team at athletics event

- WA code: ITA
- National federation: FIDAL

in (West Germany) Munich 21 February 1976 – 22 February 1976
- Competitors: 4 (4 men)
- Medals Ranked -th: Gold 0 Silver 0 Bronze 0 Total 0

European Athletics Indoor Championships appearances (overview)
- 1966; 1967; 1968; 1969; 1970; 1971; 1972; 1973; 1974; 1975; 1976; 1977; 1978; 1979; 1980; 1981; 1982; 1983; 1984; 1985; 1986; 1987; 1988; 1989; 1990; 1992; 1994; 1996; 1998; 2000; 2002; 2005; 2007; 2009; 2011; 2013; 2015; 2017; 2019; 2021; 2023

Italy competed at the 1976 European Athletics Indoor Championships in Munich, West Germany, from 21 to 22 February 1976.

== Medalists ==
| Medal | Athlete | Event |
|---|---|---|
| 1st place, gold medalist(s) | Renato Dionisi | Men's pole vault |

== Top eight ==
Three Italian athletes reached the top eight in this edition of the championships.

Men

| Athlete | 60 m | 400 m | 800 m | 1500 m | 3000 m | 60 m hs | High jump | Pole vault | Long jump | Triple jump | Shot put |
| Renato Dionisi | | | | | | | | | 3rd place, bronze medalist(s) | | |
| Roberto Veglia | | | | | | | | | | 4 | |
| Alberto Albero | | | | | | | | | | 6 | |

Women

In this edition of the championships, no Italian woman reached the top eight.

== See also ==
- Italy national athletics team
