= 1972 European Athletics Indoor Championships – Women's 800 metres =

The women's 800 metres event at the 1972 European Athletics Indoor Championships was held on 11 and 12 March in Grenoble.

== Medalists ==
Gold	Silver	Bronze
Gunhild Hoffmeister; East Germany	Ileana Silai; Romania	Svetla Zlateva; Bulgaria

== Results ==
=== Heats ===
First 2 from each heat (Q) and the next 2 fastest (q) qualified for the final.

Held on 11 March

Rank	Heat	Name	Nationality	Time	Notes
1	2	Gunhild Hoffmeister	East Germany	2:06.18	Q
2	1	Ileana Silai	Romania	2:06.28	Q
3	2	Donata Govoni	Italy	2:06.34	Q
4	2	Svetla Zlateva	Bulgaria	2:06.57	q
5	1	Gisela Ellenberger	West Germany	2:06.76	Q
6	2	Christa Merten	West Germany	2:06.82	q
7	1	Maria Sykora	Austria	2:07.26	
8	1	Margaret Beacham	Great Britain	2:08.90	
9	2	Marta Velekei	Hungary	2:09.69	
10	1	Birgitte Jennes	Denmark	2:11.09	
11	2	Danièle Verriest	France	2:11.82	

=== Final ===
Held on 12 March

Rank	Name	Nationality	Time	Notes
1st place, gold medalist(s)	Gunhild Hoffmeister	East Germany	2:04.83	CR, NR
2nd place, silver medalist(s)	Ileana Silai	Romania	2:05.17	NR
3rd place, bronze medalist(s)	Svetla Zlateva	Bulgaria	2:05.50	
4	Christa Merten	West Germany	2:05.86	
5	Gisela Ellenberger	West Germany	2:08.72	
6	Donata Govoni	Italy	2:09.69	
