= 1977 European Athletics Indoor Championships – Women's 1500 metres =

The women's 1500 metres event at the 1977 European Athletics Indoor Championships was held on 13 March in San Sebastián.

== Results ==
Rank	Name	Nationality	Time	Notes
1st place, gold medalist(s)	Mary Stewart	Great Britain	4:09.37	
2nd place, silver medalist(s)	Vesela Yatsinska	Bulgaria	4:10.0	
3rd place, bronze medalist(s)	Rumyana Chavdarova	Bulgaria	4:11.3	
4	Cornelia Bürki	Switzerland	4:16.8	
5	Geertje Meersseman	Belgium	4:18.2	
