= 1967 European Indoor Games – Men's 800 metres =

The men's 800 metres event at the 1967 European Indoor Games was held on 11 and 12 March in Prague.

== Medalists ==
Gold	Silver	Bronze
Noel Carroll; Ireland	Tomáš Jungwirth; Czechoslovakia	Jan Kasal; Czechoslovakia

== Results ==
=== Heats ===
First 3 from each heat (Q) qualified directly for the final.

Rank	Heat	Name	Nationality	Time	Notes
1	1	Gerd Larsen	Denmark	1:50.8	Q
2	1	Tomáš Jungwirth	Czechoslovakia	1:51.1	Q
3	1	Hansueli Mumenthaler	Switzerland	1:51.2	Q
4	1	Jörg Balke	West Germany	1:51.4	
5	1	Radovan Piplović	Yugoslavia	9:05.0	
1	2	Noel Carroll	Ireland	1:51.6	Q
2	2	Pierre Toussaint	France	1:51.7	Q
3	2	Jan Kasal	Czechoslovakia	1:51.8	Q
4	2	Mathias Seidler	East Germany	1:51.8	
5	2	Gianfranco Carabelli	Italy	1:52.1	

=== Final ===
Rank	Name	Nationality	Time	Notes
1st place, gold medalist(s)	Noel Carroll	Ireland	1:49.6	
2nd place, silver medalist(s)	Tomáš Jungwirth	Czechoslovakia	1:49.8	
3rd place, bronze medalist(s)	Jan Kasal	Czechoslovakia	1:50.0	
4	Hansueli Mumenthaler	Switzerland	1:53.4	
	Pierre Toussaint	France	DQ	
	Gerd Larsen	Denmark	DNF	
