= 1966 European Indoor Games – Men's pole vault =

The men's pole vault event at the 1966 European Indoor Games was held on 27 March in Dortmund.

== Results ==
Rank	Name	Nationality	Result	Notes
1st place, gold medalist(s)	Hennadiy Bleznitsov	Soviet Union	4.90	
2nd place, silver medalist(s)	Rudolf Tomášek	Czechoslovakia	4.80	
3rd place, bronze medalist(s)	Reiner Liese	West Germany	4.70	
4	Igor Feld	Soviet Union	4.60	
5	Miguel Consegal	Spain	4.40	
6	Claus Schiprowski	West Germany	4.40	
7	Maurice Houvion	France	4.40	
8	Daniel Borrey	Belgium	4.40	
