= 1967 European Indoor Games – Men's 3 × 1000 metres relay =

The men's 3 × 1000 metres relay event at the 1967 European Indoor Games was held on 12 March in Prague. It was the first time that this event was held at the championships.

== Results ==
Rank	Nation	Competitors	Time	Notes
1st place, gold medalist(s)	West Germany	Klaus Prenner; Wolf-Jochen Schulte-Hillen; Franz-Josef Kemper	7:19.6	
2nd place, silver medalist(s)	Czechoslovakia	Pavel Hruška; Pavel Pěnkava; Petr Blaha	7:20.0	
3rd place, bronze medalist(s)	Soviet Union	Ramir Mitrofanov; Stanislav Simbirtsev; Mikhail Zhelobovskiy	7:20.6	
4	Yugoslavia	Ivan Pavličević; Radovan Piplović; Jože Međimurec	7:43.8	
