= 1983 European Athletics Indoor Championships – Women's 3000 metres =

The women's 3000 metres event at the 1983 European Athletics Indoor Championships was held on 6 March.

== Results ==
Rank	Name	Nationality	Time	Notes
1st place, gold medalist(s)	Yelena Sipatova	Soviet Union	9:04.40	
2nd place, silver medalist(s)	Agnese Possamai	Italy	9:04.41	
3rd place, bronze medalist(s)	Yelena Malykhina	Soviet Union	9:04.52	
4	Vera Michallek	West Germany	9:06.71	
5	Ilona Jankó	Hungary	9:30.28	
6	Margherita Gargano	Italy	9:32.56	
7	Doris Weilharter	Austria	9:35.65	
