= 1968 European Indoor Games – Men's 1500 metres =

European 1500 meters Indoor Games held on March 10 1968

The men's 1500 metres event at the 1968 European Indoor Games was held on 10 March in Madrid.

== Results ==
Rank	Name	Nationality	Time	Notes
1st place, gold medalist(s)	John Whetton	Great Britain	3:50.94	
2nd place, silver medalist(s)	José Morera	Spain	3:51.7	
3rd place, bronze medalist(s)	Igor Potapchenko	Soviet Union	3:51.9	
4	José Lourenço	Portugal	3:59.6	
