= Italy at the 2023 European Athletics Indoor Championships =

Italy team at athletics event

- WA code: ITA
- National federation: FIDAL

in (Turkey) Istanbul 2 March 2023 – 5 March 2023
- Competitors: 49 (25 men, 24 women)
- Medals Ranked 4th: Gold 2 Silver 4 Bronze 0 Total 6

European Athletics Indoor Championships appearances (overview)
- 1966; 1967; 1968; 1969; 1970; 1971; 1972; 1973; 1974; 1975; 1976; 1977; 1978; 1979; 1980; 1981; 1982; 1983; 1984; 1985; 1986; 1987; 1988; 1989; 1990; 1992; 1994; 1996; 1998; 2000; 2002; 2005; 2007; 2009; 2011; 2013; 2015; 2017; 2019; 2021; 2023

Italy competed at the 2023 European Athletics Indoor Championships in Istanbul, Turkey (Ataköy Athletics Arena), from 2 to 5 March 2023.

In this edition of the championships, Italy won six medals, 4 of which were gold, finishing in 4th place in the medal table.

== Medalists ==
Medal	Athlete	Event
1st place, gold medalist(s)	Samuele Ceccarelli	Men's 60 m
1st place, gold medalist(s)	Zane Weir	Men's shot put
2nd place, silver medalist(s)	Marcell Jacobs	Men's 60 m
2nd place, silver medalist(s)	Dariya Derkach	Women's triple jump
2nd place, silver medalist(s)	Larissa Iapichino	Women's long jump
2nd place, silver medalist(s)	Alice Mangione; Ayomide Folorunso; Anna Polinari; Eleonora Marchiando	Women's 4 × 400 m relay

== Top eight ==
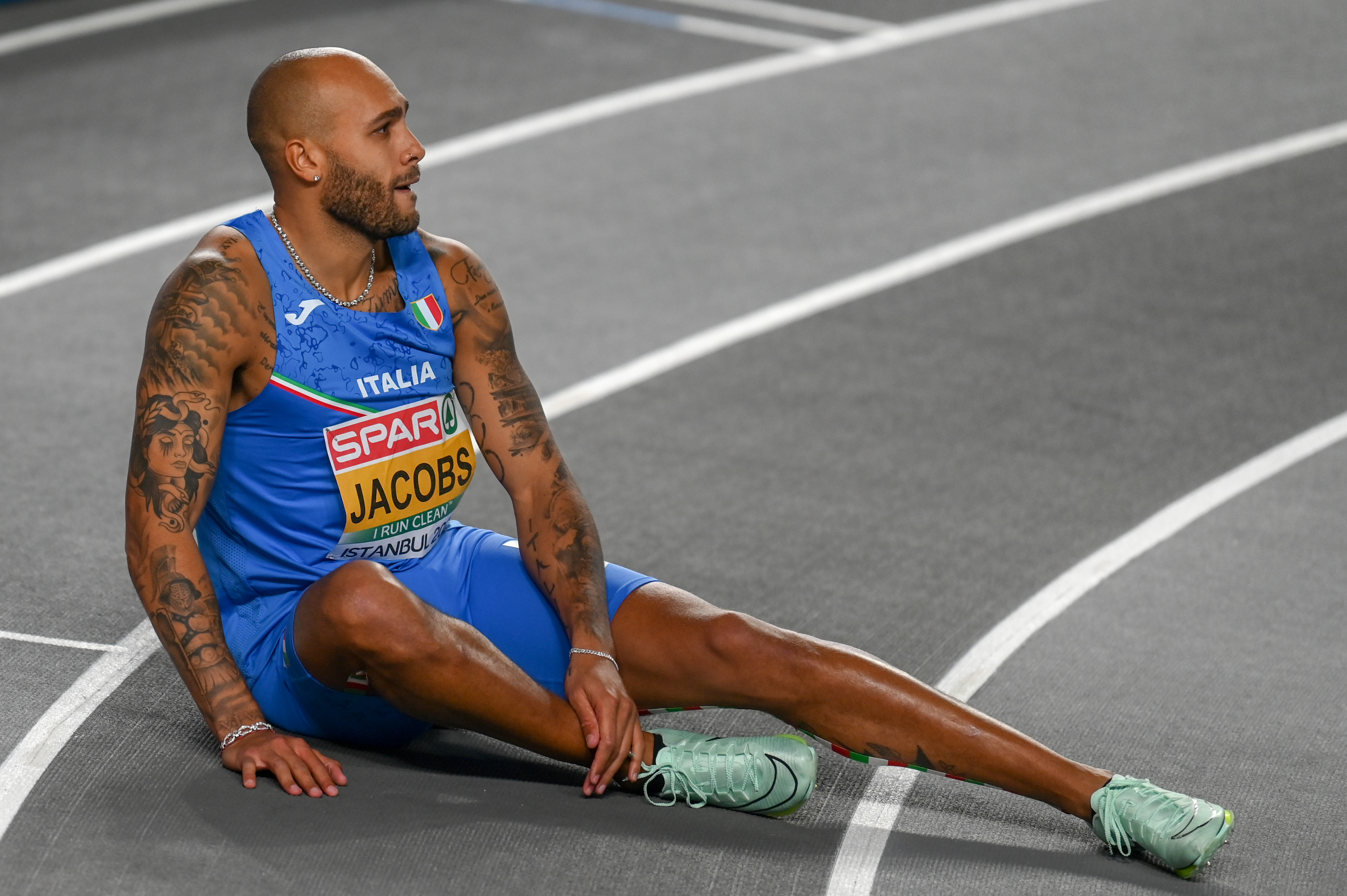
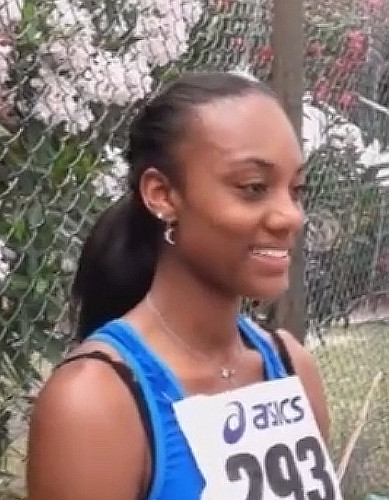
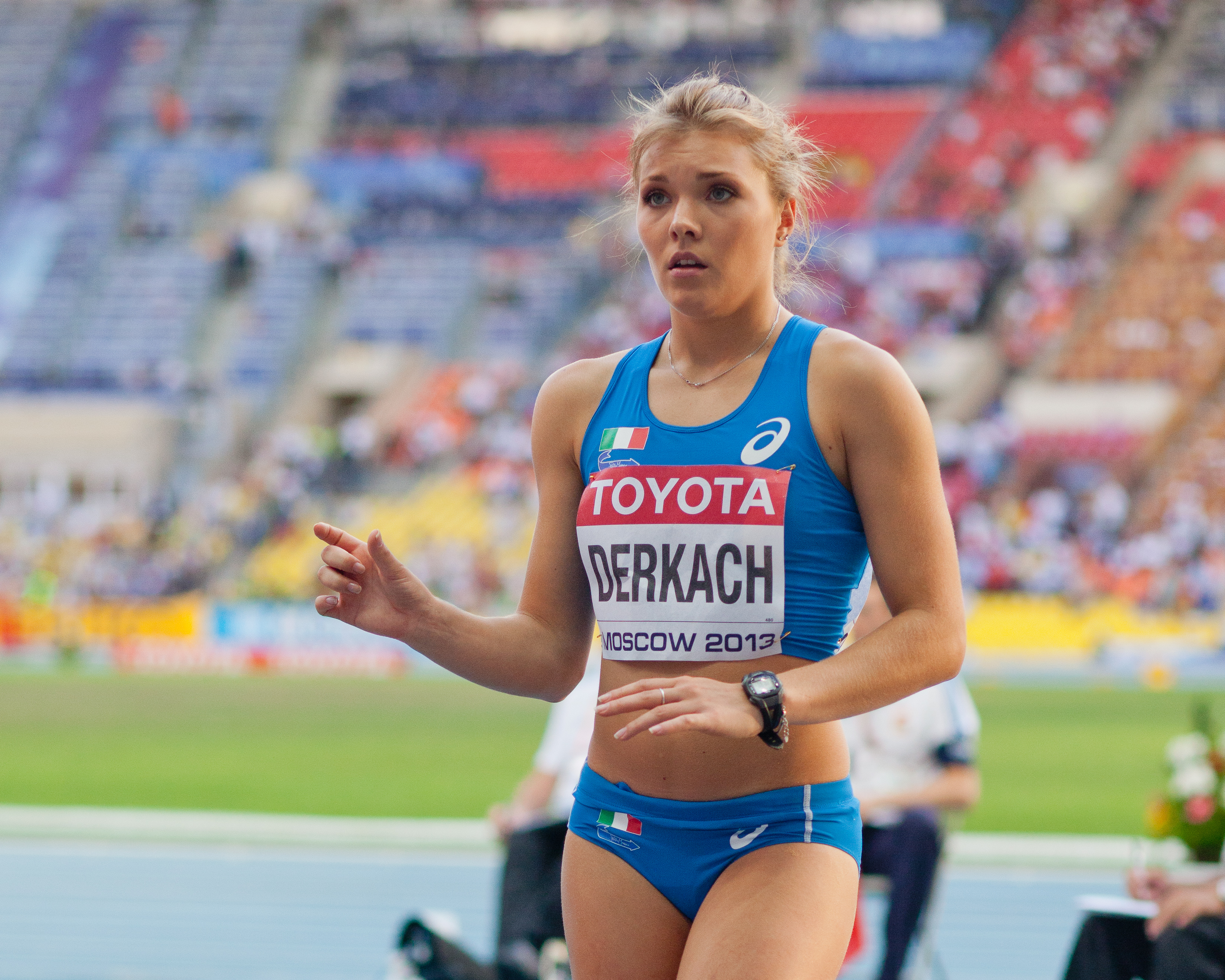
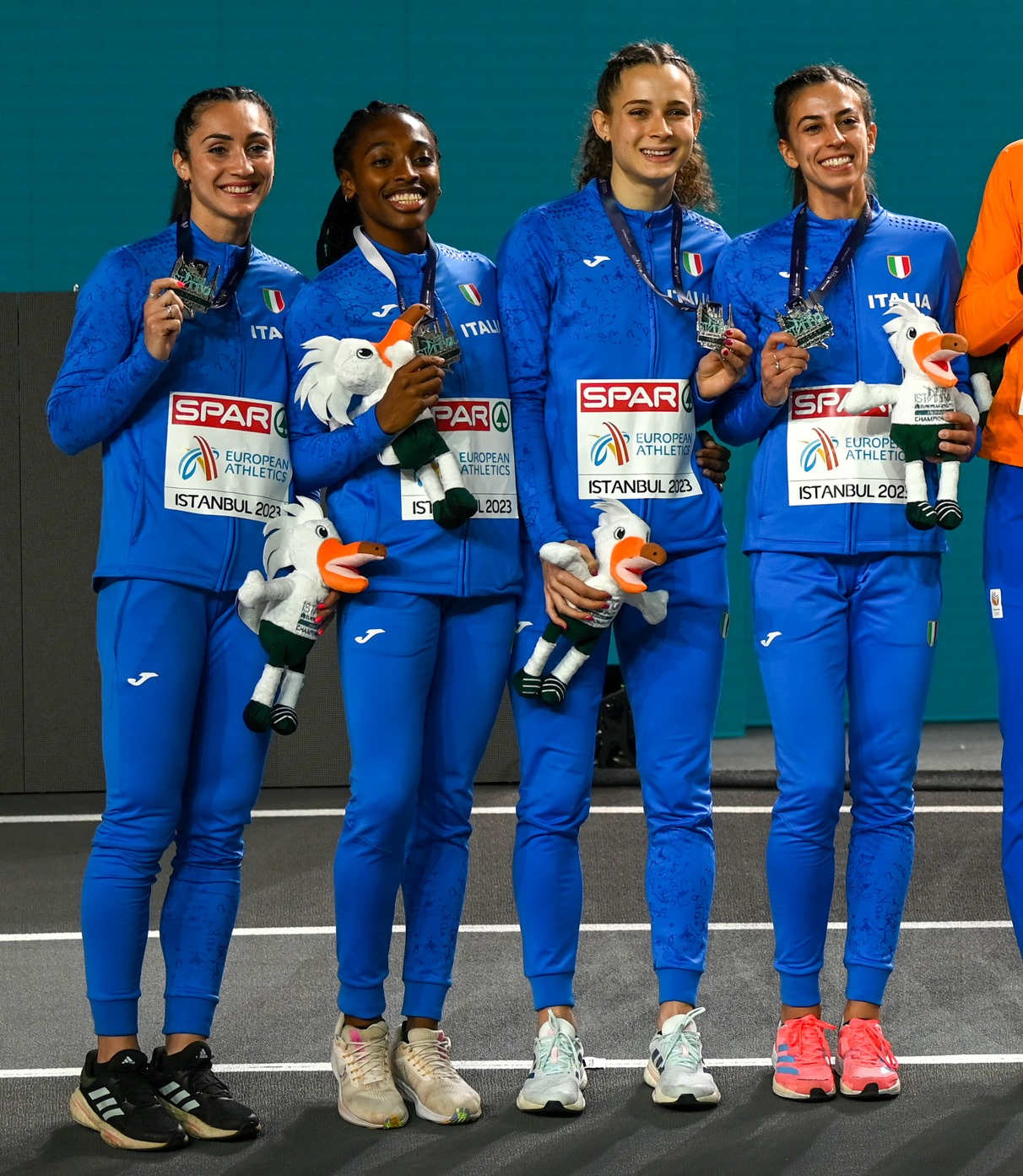
Marcell Jacobs after 60 m silver medal won, Larissa Iapichino, Dariya Derkach and the 4×400 m women's relay team (from left: Alice Mangione, Ayomide Folorunso, Anna Polinari, Eleonora Marchiando.

Twenty Italian competitors including the 4 × 400 m women's relay team reached the top eight in this edition of the championships and the team won the placing table for the first time of its history.

=== Men ===
Athlete	60 m	400 m	800 m	1500 m	3000 m	60 m hs	4×400 m relay	High jump	Pole vault	Long jump	Triple jump	Shot put	Heptathlon
Samuele Ceccarelli	1st place, gold medalist(s)												
Marcell Jacobs	2nd place, silver medalist(s)												
Catalin Tecuceanu			7										
Simone Barontini			8										
Pietro Arese				5									
Lorenzo Simonelli						4							
Paolo Dal Molin						5							
Christian Falocchi								6					
Marco Fassinotti								8					
Claudio Stecchi									6				
Tobia Bocchi											6		
Zane Weir												1st place, gold medalist(s)	

=== Women ===
Athlete	60 m	400 m	800 m	1500 m	3000 m	60 m hs	4×400 m relay	High jump	Pole vault	Long jump	Triple jump	Shot put	Pentathlon
Eloisa Coiro			7										
Nadia Battocletti					4								
Roberta Bruni									8				
Larissa Iapichino										2nd place, silver medalist(s)			
Dariya Derkach											2nd place, silver medalist(s)		
Ottavia Cestonaro											4		
Sveva Gerevini													8
Relay team Alice Mangione; Ayomide Folorunso; Anna Polinari; Eleonora Marchiando							2nd place, silver medalist(s)						

== See also ==
- Italy national athletics team
