= 1969 European Indoor Games – Men's 3 × 1000 metres relay =

The men's 3 × 1000 metres relay event at the 1969 European Indoor Games was held on 9 March in Belgrade. It was the last time that this relay was contested at the European Indoor Games or Championships.

== Results ==
Rank	Nation	Competitors	Time	Notes
1st place, gold medalist(s)	West Germany	Anton Adam; Walter Adams; Harald Norpoth	7:08.0	
2nd place, silver medalist(s)	Czechoslovakia	Ján Šišovský; Petr Blaha; Pavel Pěnkava	7:23.1	
3rd place, bronze medalist(s)	Yugoslavia	Radovan Piplović; Slavko Koprivica; Adam Ladik	7:42.8	
