= 1967 European Indoor Games – Men's 400 metres =

The men's 400 metres event at the 1967 European Indoor Games was held on 11 and 12 March in Prague.

== Medalists ==
| Gold | Silver | Bronze |
|---|---|---|
| Manfred Kinder; West Germany | Hartmut Koch; East Germany | Nikolay Shkarnikov; Soviet Union |

== Results ==
=== Heats ===
First 3 from each heat (Q) qualified directly for the final.

| Rank | Heat | Name | Nationality | Time | Notes |
|---|---|---|---|---|---|
| 1 | 1 | Manfred Kinder | West Germany | 48.4 | Q |
| 2 | 1 | Miroslav Veruk | Czechoslovakia | 48.5 | Q |
| 3 | 1 | Willy Vandenwyngaerden | Belgium | 49.2 | |
| 4 | 1 | István Gyulai | Hungary | 49.2 | |
| 1 | 2 | Nikolay Shkarnikov | Soviet Union | 49.6 | Q |
| 2 | 2 | Hartmut Koch | East Germany | 49.7 | Q |
| 3 | 2 | František Ortman | Czechoslovakia | 55.8 | |
| | 2 | Sergio Bello | Italy | DQ | |

=== Final ===
| Rank | Name | Nationality | Time | Notes |
|---|---|---|---|---|
| 1st place, gold medalist(s) | Manfred Kinder | West Germany | 48.4 | |
| 2nd place, silver medalist(s) | Hartmut Koch | East Germany | 48.6 | |
| 3rd place, bronze medalist(s) | Nikolay Shkarnikov | Soviet Union | 50.4 | |
| 4 | Miroslav Veruk | Czechoslovakia | 50.8 | |
