= 1983 European Athletics Indoor Championships – Women's shot put =

The women's shot put event at the 1983 European Athletics Indoor Championships was held on 6 March.

== Results ==
Rank	Name	Nationality	#1	#2	#3	#4	#5	#6	Result	Notes
1st place, gold medalist(s)	Helena Fibingerová	Czechoslovakia	20.61	19.96	x	19.20	19.82	20.01	20.61	
2nd place, silver medalist(s)	Helma Knorscheidt	East Germany	20.35	20.35	20.21	20.04	20.09	20.28	20.35	
3rd place, bronze medalist(s)	Zdeňka Šilhavá	Czechoslovakia	17.89	18.58	18.82	19.56	18.38	18.79	19.56	
4	Mihaela Loghin	Romania	19.33	19.27	19.09	x	18.84	19.15	19.33	
5	Nunu Abashidze	Soviet Union	18.36	19.19	19.27	x	x	18.74	19.27	
6	Venissa Head	Great Britain	17.72	17.22	17.89	x	17.08	x	17.89	
7	Simone Créantor	France	16.09	x	x	15.97	16.29	x	16.29	
	Natalya Lisovskaya	Soviet Union							DNS	
