= Michele Di Pace =

Italian sprinter

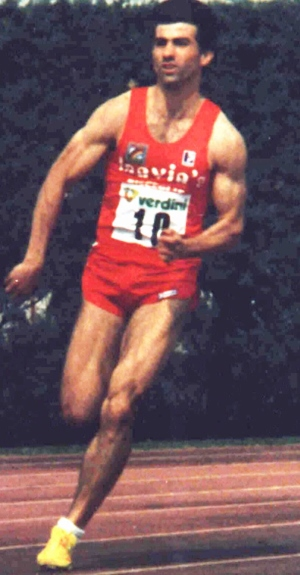

Personal information
- National team: Italy: 3 caps (1982)
- Born: 12 May 1960 (age 66) Barletta, Italy

Sport
- Sport: Athletics
- Event: 200 metres
- Club: Ford Omer Barletta
- Coached by: Carlo Vittori
- Retired: 1990

Achievements and titles
- Personal best: 200 m indoor: 21.43 (1982)
Medal record
European Indoor Championships
Bronze medal – third place	1982 Milan	200 m

Michele Di Pace (born 12 May 1960) is a former Italian sprinter who was bronze medal at the 1982 European Indoor Championships.

== Career ==
Meteor of Italian athletics, he competed at international senior level for only one season, the 1982 (22 years) season in which he won the bronze medal at the European indoor championships and the Italian title always indoors, as well as collecting three appearances in the Italian national team and establishing his personal record, all in the 200 meters specialty.

== Achievements ==
Year	Competition	Venue	Rank	Event	Time	Notes
1982	European Indoor Championships	(Italy) Milan	3rd	200 m	21.52	

== National titles ==
Di Pace won a national championship at individual senior level.

- Italian Athletics Indoor Championships
- 200 m: 1982

== See also ==
- Italy at the European Athletics Indoor Championships
