= 1966 European Indoor Games – Men's 4 × 320 metres relay =

The men's 4 × 320 metres relay event at the 1966 European Indoor Games was held on 27 March in Dortmund. Each athlete ran two laps of the 160 metres track.

== Results ==
Rank	Nation	Competitors	Time	Notes
1st place, gold medalist(s)	West Germany	Jörg Jüttner; Rainer Kunter; Hans Reinermann; Jens Ulbrich	2:30.1	
2nd place, silver medalist(s)	Czechoslovakia	Miroslav Veruk; Juraj Demeč; Ladislav Kříž; Josef Trousil	2:31.0	
