= Italy at the 1970 European Athletics Indoor Championships =

Italy team at athletics event

- WA code: ITA
- National federation: FIDAL

in (Austria) Vienna 14 March 1970 – 15 March 1970
- Competitors: 9 (6 men. 3 women)
- Medals Ranked -th: Gold 0 Silver 0 Bronze 0 Total 0

European Athletics Indoor Championships appearances (overview)
- 1966; 1967; 1968; 1969; 1970; 1971; 1972; 1973; 1974; 1975; 1976; 1977; 1978; 1979; 1980; 1981; 1982; 1983; 1984; 1985; 1986; 1987; 1988; 1989; 1990; 1992; 1994; 1996; 1998; 2000; 2002; 2005; 2007; 2009; 2011; 2013; 2015; 2017; 2019; 2021; 2023

Italy competed at the 1970 European Athletics Indoor Championships in Vienna, Austria, from 14 to 15 March 1970.

== Medalists ==
In this edition of the championships, Italy did not win any medals.

== Top eight ==
Men

Athlete	60 m	400 m	800 m	1500 m	3000 m	60 m hs	4×400 m relay	Medley relay	High jump	Pole vault	Long jump	Triple jump	Shot put
Giuseppe Gentile												7	

Women

In this edition of the championships, no Italian woman reached the top eight.

== See also ==
- Italy national athletics team
