= Athletic Club 96 =

Italian athletics club

- Founded: 1996
- League: Italian Athletics Federation (FIDAL)
- Based in: Bolzano
- Stadium: Campo scuola CONI di Bolzano
- Colors: White, Red & Blu
- President: Brunetto Telchini
- Championships: Italian for clubs

The Athletic Club 96, also known as Athletic Club 96 Alperia, is an Italian athletics club based in Bolzano, founded in 1996, reigning Italian champion.

== Achievements ==
Athletic Club 96 won two consecutive editions of the men's Italian Championships in Athletics for clubs in both 209 and 2020.

== Main athletes ==
Below is the list of the main athletes in force at the Athletic Club 96 Alperia in 2021.

- Antonio Infantino
- Luca Lai
- Brayan Lopez
- Isalbet Juarez
- Jacques Riparelli
- Fabio Cerutti
- Robert Grant
- Leonardo Dei Tos
- Gianluca Tamberi
- Antonino Trio

== See also ==
- Athletics in Italy
