= Riccardo Materazzi =

Italian middle-distance runner

Personal information
- Nationality: Italian
- Born: 15 June 1963 (age 63) Brussels, Belgium
- Height: 1.76 m (5 ft 9 1/2 in)
- Weight: 63 kg (139 lb)

Sport
- Country: Italy
- Sport: Athletics
- Event: Middle distance running
- Club: Atletic Club Bergamo

Achievements and titles
- Personal bests: 800 m: 1:46.03 (1984); 1500 m: 3:35.79 (1984)
Medal record
European Indoor Championships
Silver medal – second place	1984 Gothemburg	1500 metres

Riccardo Materazzi (born 15 June 1963 in Brussels, Région de Bruxelles-Capitale) is a retired male middle-distance runner from Italy.

He competed for his home country at the 1984 Summer Olympics in Los Angeles, California. Materazzi won the silver medal in the men's 1,500 metres at the 1984 European Indoor Championships in Gothenburg, Sweden.

== International competitions ==
Year	Competition	Venue	Position	Event	Notes
1984	Olympic Games	Los Angeles, United States	QF	800 metres	1:47.90
1984	Olympic Games	Los Angeles, United States	11th	1500 metres	3:40.74

== National titles ==
Riccardo Materazzi has won 2 times the individual national championship.

- 2 wins in the 1500 metres indoor (1984, 1985)
