= Brayan Lopez (athlete) =

Italian sprinter

Personal information
- National team: Italy (2 caps)
- Born: 20 June 1997 (age 29) San Juan de la Maguana, Dominican Republic
- Height: 1.77 m (5 ft 10 in)
- Weight: 66 kg (146 lb)

Sport
- Country: Italy
- Sport: Athletics
- Event: 400 metres
- Club: Athletic Club 96 Alperia; G.S. Fiamme Azzurre
- Coached by: Francesco Ricci
- Personal best: 400 m: 46.16 (2019)
Medal record
Senior level
Event	1st	2nd	3rd
European Team Championships	1	0	0
Total	1	0	0
Youth level
Event	1st	2nd	3rd
European U23 Championships	0	0	1
European U20 Championships	0	1	0
Total	0	1	1
European Championships
Silver medal – second place	2024 Rome	4 × 400 m relay
European Team Championships
Gold medal – first place	2019 Bydgoszcz	4 × 400 m relay

Brayan Lopez (born 20 June 1997 in San Juan de la Maguana) is an Italian sprinter.

== Career ==
He won the bronze medal at 400 m during the 2019 European Athletics U23 Championships. He also won the relay 4 × 400 metres at the 2019 European Team Championships in Bydgoszcz, with a European Lead Best.

== Achievements ==
Year	Competition	Venue	Position	Event	Time	Notes
2019	European Indoor Championships	(United Kingdom) Glasgow	6th	4 × 400 m relay	3:09.48	
2019	European U23 Championships	(Sweden) Gävle	3rd	400 metres	46.16	PB
