= Marco Piochi =

Italian long jumper

Personal information
- Nationality: Italian
- Born: 1 January 1957 (age 69) Montefollonico, Italy

Sport
- Country: Italy
- Sport: Athletics
- Event: Long jump

Achievements and titles
- Personal best: Long jump: 8.09 m (1983)
Medal record
Mediterranean Games
Bronze medal – third place	1983 Casablanca	Long jump

Marco Piochi (born 1 January 1957) is a retired Italian long jumper.

== Biography ==
His personal best jump was 8.09 metres, achieved in June 1983 in Milan. He has 24 caps in national team from 1978 to 1985.

== Achievements ==
Year	Tournament	Venue	Result	Extra
1979	European Indoor Championships	Vienna, Austria	7th	
1982	European Indoor Championships	Milan, Italy	6th	
1983	Mediterranean Games	Casablanca, Morocco	3rd	
1984	European Indoor Championships	Gothenburg, Sweden	4th	

== National titles ==
He has won 1 times the individual national championship.

- 1 win in the long jump (1983)
- 1 win in the long jump indoor (1980)

== See also ==
- Men's long jump Italian record progression
