= Roberto Tozzi =

Italian sprinter

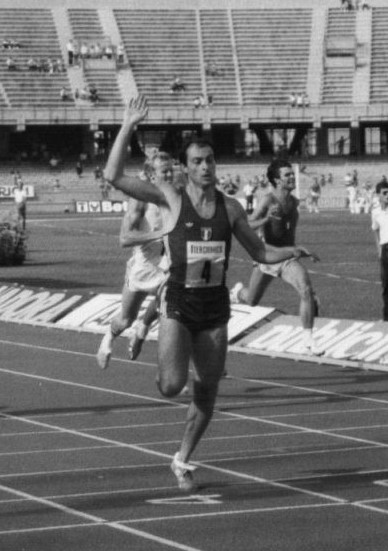

Personal information
- Nationality: Italian
- Born: 17 December 1958 (age 67) Rome, Italy
- Height: 1.80 m (5 ft 11 in)
- Weight: 72 kg (159 lb)

Sport
- Country: Italy
- Sport: Athletics
- Event: Sprint

Achievements and titles
- Personal best: 400 m: 46.03 (1984)
Medal record
Representing Italy
Olympic Games
Bronze medal – third place	1980 Moscow	4x400m relay
European Indoor Championships
Silver medal – second place	1984 Gothenburg	400m
Summer Universiade
Bronze medal – third place	1979 Mexico City	4x400m relay
Mediterranean Games
Bronze medal – third place	1979 Split	4x400m relay
European Junior Championships
Gold medal – first place	1977 Donetsk	400m

Roberto Tozzi (born 17 December 1958) is an Italian former sprinter who specialized in the 400 metres.

== Biography ==
He won a bronze medal in the 4 x 400 metres relay at the 1980 Summer Olympics, with teammates Stefano Malinverni, Mauro Zuliani and Pietro Mennea.

His personal best time is 46.03 seconds, achieved in September 1984 in Rieti.

== Achievements ==
Year	Competition	Venue	Position	Event
Representing Italy
1977	European Junior Championships	Donetsk, Soviet Union	1st	400 m
1980	Olympic Games	Moscow, Soviet Union	3rd	4 × 400 m relay
1982	European Championships	Athens, Greece	6th	4 × 400 m relay
1984	European Indoor Championships	Gothenburg, Sweden	2nd	400 m
1984	Olympic Games	Los Angeles, United States	5th	4 × 400 m relay

== See also ==
- Italy national relay team
