= Stefano Malinverni =

Italian sprinter (1959–2024)

Personal information
- Born: 14 May 1959 Cinisello Balsamo, Italy
- Died: 19 June 2024 (aged 65) Milan, Italy
- Height: 1.80 m (5 ft 11 in)
- Weight: 73 kg (161 lb)

Sport
- Country: Italy
- Sport: Athletics
- Event: 400 metres

Achievements and titles
- Personal best: 400 m: 46.09 (1981)
Medal record
Event	1st	2nd	3rd
Olympic Games	0	0	1
European Indoor Championships	0	1	1
Summer Universiade	0	0	1
Mediterranean Games	0	0	1
European Cup	1	0	0

Stefano Malinverni (14 May 1959 – 19 June 2024) was an Italian sprinter who specialized in the 400 metres.

== Biography ==
Malinverni won six medals at the International athletics competitions, four of these with national relays team. He participated at one edition of the Summer Olympics (1980), he has 36 caps in national team from 1977 to 1986.

He won a bronze medal in the 4 × 400 metres relay at the 1980 Summer Olympics, with teammates Mauro Zuliani, Roberto Tozzi and Pietro Mennea. His personal best time was 46.09 seconds, achieved in July 1981 in Milan.

Malinverni died in Milan on 19 June 2024, at the age of 65.

== Achievements ==
Year	Competition	Venue	Position	Event	Performance	Notes
1979	European Indoor Championships	(Austria) Vienna	2nd	400 m	46.69	
1979	Mediterranean Games	(Socialist Federal Republic of Yugoslavia) Split	3rd	4 × 400 m relay	3:04.61	
1979	Summer Universiade	Mexico City	3rd	4 × 400 m relay	3:03.80	
1980	Olympic Games	(Soviet Union) Moscow	3rd	4 × 400 m relay	3:04.03	
1981	European Indoor Championships	(France) Grenoble	3rd	400 m	46.96	
1981	European Cup	(Socialist Federal Republic of Yugoslavia) Zagreb	1st	4 × 400 m relay	3:01.42	
1983	World Championships	(Finland) Helsinki	5th	4 × 400 m relay	3:05.10	

== National titles ==
He has won 5 times the individual national championship.

- 3 wins in the 400 metres (1979, 1980, 1981)
- 2 wins in the 400 metres indoor (1979, 1980)

== See also ==
- Italy national relay team
