= Rita Bottiglieri =

Italian sprinter and pentathlete

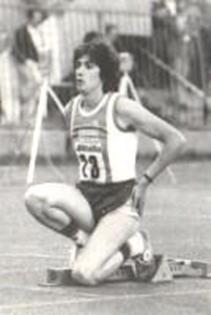

Personal information
- Nationality: Italian
- Born: 29 June 1953 (age 72) Torre del Greco, Italy
- Height: 1.70 m (5 ft 7 in)
- Weight: 62 kg (137 lb)

Sport
- Country: Italy
- Sport: Athletics
- Event(s): Sprint; Pentathlon
- Club: Snia Milano

Achievements and titles
- Personal bests: 60 m: 7.34 (1977); 60 m hs: 8.39 (1977); 100 m: 11.46 (1977); 200 m: 23.15 (1977); 400 m: 52.24 (1977); 400 m hs: 56.76 (1980)
Medal record
European Indoor Championships
Silver medal – second place	1978 Milan	400 metres
Bronze medal – third place	1977 San Sebastián	60 metres
Bronze medal – third place	1977 San Sebastián	60 metres hurdles

Rita Bottiglieri (born 29 June 1953 in Torre del Greco, Naples, Italy) is a former sprinter and pentathlete from Italy.

== Biography ==
She won three medals at the European Indoor Championships. Rita Bottiglieri, dubbed by the press "the athlete anywhere," was eclectic athlete: in 1976, ranking on nine seasonal Italian specialties, in first place in five.

== Achievements ==
Year	Tournament	Venue	Result	Event
1975	Mediterranean Games	Algiers, Algeria	1st	100 metres
	Mediterranean Games	Algiers, Algeria	2nd	400 metres
1977	European Indoor Championships	San Sebastián, Spain	3rd	60 metres
	European Indoor Championships	San Sebastián, Spain	3rd	60 metres hurdles
1978	European Indoor Championships	Milan, Italy	2nd	400 metres

== National titles ==
Rita Bottiglieri has won nine times the individual national championship.

- 3 wins on 100 metres (1975, 1976, 1977)
- 3 wins on 200 metres (1975, 1976, 1977)
- 2 wins on 200 metres indoor (1975, 1978)
- 1 win on pentathlon indoor (1974)

== See also ==
- Italy national relay team
- Italian all-time lists - 400 metres hurdles
