= 1984 European Athletics Indoor Championships =

- Dates: 3–4 March 1984
- Host city: Gothenburg; Sweden
- Venue: Scandinavium
- Events: 22
- Participation: 242 athletes from 26 nations

The 1984 European Athletics Indoor Championships were held at Scandinavium in Gothenburg, Sweden on the 3 and 4 March 1984. The track used in the stadium at the time was 196 metres long.

== Medal summary ==
=== Men ===
| Event | Gold | | Silver | | Bronze | |
|---|---|---|---|---|---|---|
| 60 metres | Christian Haas (FRG) | 6.68 | Antonio Ullo (ITA) | 6.68 | Ronald Desruelles (BEL) | 6.69 |
| 200 metres | Aleksandr Yevgenyev (URS) | 20.98 | Ade Mafe (GBR) | 21.34 | Giovanni Bongiorni (ITA) | 21.48 |
| 400 metres | Sergey Lovachov (URS) | 46.72 | Roberto Tozzi (ITA) | 47.01 | Didier Dubois (FRA) | 47.29 |
| 800 metres | Donato Sabia (ITA) | 1:48.05 | André Lavie (FRA) | 1:48.35 | Phil Norgate (GBR) | 1:48.39 |
| 1500 metres | Peter Wirz (SUI) | 3:41.35 | Riccardo Materazzi (ITA) | 3:41.57 | Thomas Wessinghage (FRG) | 3:41.75 |
| 3000 metres | Lubomír Tesáček (TCH) | 7:53.16 | Markus Ryffel (SUI) | 7:53.61 | Karl Fleschen (FRG) | 7:54.45 |
| 60 metres hurdles | Romuald Giegiel (POL) | 7.62 | György Bakos (HUN) | 7.75 | Jiří Hudec (TCH) | 7.77 |
| High jump | Dietmar Mögenburg (FRG) | 2.33 | Carlo Thränhardt (FRG) | 2.30 | Roland Dalhäuser (SUI) | 2.30 |
| Pole vault | Thierry Vigneron (FRA) | 5.85 | Pierre Quinon (FRA) | 5.75 | Aleksandr Krupskiy (URS) | 5.60 |
| Long jump | Jan Leitner (TCH) | 7.96 | Mathias Koch (GDR) | 7.91 | Robert Emmiyan (URS) | 7.89 |
| Triple jump | Grigoriy Yemets (URS) | 17.33 | Vlastimil Mařinec (TCH) | 17.16 | Béla Bakosi (HUN) | 17.15 |
| Shot put | Jānis Bojārs (URS) | 20.84 | Werner Günthör (SUI) | 20.33 | Alessandro Andrei (ITA) | 20.32 |

=== Women ===
| Event | Gold | | Silver | | Bronze | |
|---|---|---|---|---|---|---|
| 60 metres | Beverly Kinch (GBR) | 7.16 | Anelia Nuneva (BUL) | 7.23 | Nelli Cooman (NED) | 7.23 |
| 200 metres | Jarmila Kratochvílová (TCH) | 23.02 | Marie-Christine Cazier (FRA) | 23.68 | Olga Antonova (URS) | 23.80 |
| 400 metres | Taťána Kocembová (TCH) | 49.97 | Erica Rossi (ITA) | 52.37 | Rositsa Stamenova (BUL) | 52.41 |
| 800 metres | Milena Matejkovičová (TCH) | 1:59.52 | Doina Melinte (ROM) | 1:59.81 | Cristieana Cojocaru (ROM) | 2:01.24 |
| 1500 metres | Fiţa Lovin (ROM) | 4:10.03 | Elly van Hulst (NED) | 4:11.09 | Sandra Gasser (SUI) | 4:11.70 |
| 3000 metres | Brigitte Kraus (FRG) | 9:12.07 | Tatyana Pozdnyakova (URS) | 9:15.04 | Ivana Kleinová (TCH) | 9:15.71 |
| 60 metres hurdles | Lucyna Kałek (POL) | 7.96 | Vera Akimova (URS) | 7.99 | Yordanka Donkova (BUL) | 8.09 |
| High jump | Ulrike Meyfarth (FRG) | 1.95 | Maryse Ewanjé-Epée (FRA) | 1.95 | Danuta Bułkowska (POL) | 1.95 |
| Long jump | Sue Hearnshaw (GBR) | 6.70 | Eva Murková (TCH) | 6.55 | Stefania Lazzaroni (ITA) | 6.08 |
| Shot put | Helena Fibingerová (TCH) | 20.34 | Claudia Losch (FRG) | 20.23 | Heidi Krieger (GDR) | 20.18 |

== Medal table ==
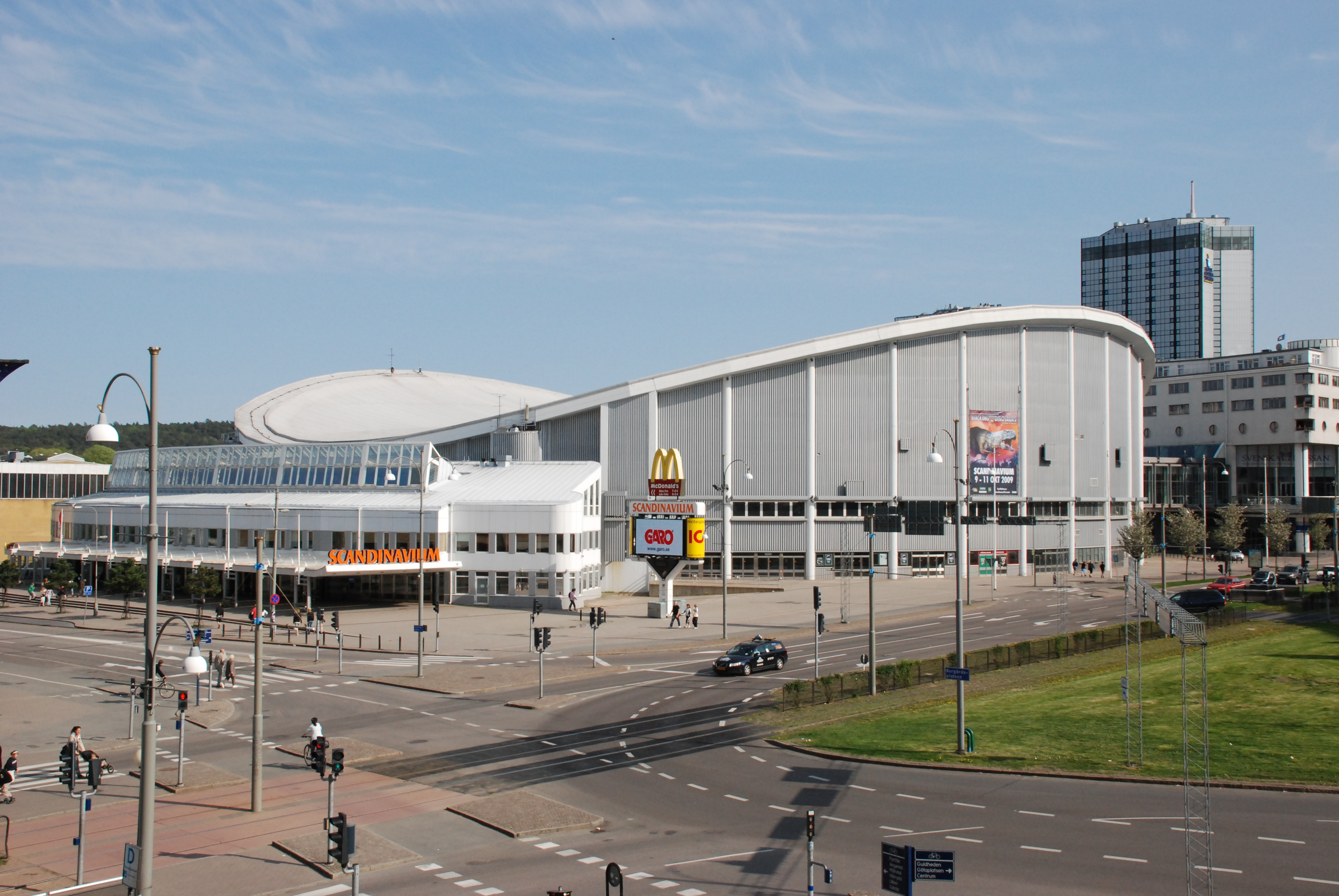
The host venue (shown in 2009)

| Rank | Nation | Gold | Silver | Bronze | Total |
|---|---|---|---|---|---|
| 1 | Czechoslovakia (TCH) | 6 | 2 | 2 | 10 |
| 2 | Soviet Union (URS) | 4 | 2 | 3 | 9 |
| 3 | West Germany (FRG) | 4 | 2 | 2 | 8 |
| 4 | Great Britain (GBR) | 2 | 1 | 1 | 4 |
| 5 | Poland (POL) | 2 | 0 | 1 | 3 |
| 6 | Italy (ITA) | 1 | 4 | 3 | 8 |
| 7 | France (FRA) | 1 | 4 | 1 | 6 |
| 8 | Switzerland (SUI) | 1 | 2 | 2 | 5 |
| 9 | Romania (ROU) | 1 | 1 | 1 | 3 |
| 10 | Bulgaria (BUL) | 0 | 1 | 2 | 3 |
| 11 | East Germany (GDR) | 0 | 1 | 1 | 2 |
| 11 | Hungary (HUN) | 0 | 1 | 1 | 2 |
| 11 | Netherlands (NED) | 0 | 1 | 1 | 2 |
| 14 | Belgium (BEL) | 0 | 0 | 1 | 1 |
| Totals (14 entries) | | 22 | 22 | 22 | 66 |

== Participating nations ==
- Austria (5)
- Belgium (4)
- Bulgaria (10)
- Cyprus (2)
- Czechoslovakia (22)
- Denmark (1)
- East Germany (3)
- Finland (7)
- France (15)
- Great Britain (10)
- Greece (3)
- Hungary (2)
- Iceland (2)
- Italy (22)
- Luxembourg (1)
- Netherlands (4)
- Norway (12)
- Poland (22)
- Romania (6)
- Soviet Union (15)
- Spain (12)
- Sweden (23)
- Switzerland (5)
- Turkey (3)
- West Germany (26)
- Yugoslavia (5)

== See also ==
- 1984 in athletics (track and field)
