= List of European Athletics Indoor Championships medalists (men) =

This is a complete list of men's medalists of the European Athletics Indoor Championships and its predecessor event, the European Indoor Games (1966-1969).

== Track ==
=== 60 m ===
Games	Gold	Silver	Bronze
European Indoor Games
1966 Dortmund	Barrie Kelly (GBR)	Heinz Erbstößer (GDR)	Viktor Kasatkin (URS)
1967 Prague	Pasquale Giannattasio (ITA)	Aleksandr Lebedev (URS)	Viktor Kasatkin (URS)
1968 Madrid	Jobst Hirscht (FRG)	Bob Frith (GBR)	Günter Gollos (GDR)
1969 Belgrade	Zenon Nowosz (POL)	Valeriy Borzov (URS)	Bob Frith (GBR)
European Athletics Indoor Championships
1970 Vienna	Valeriy Borzov (URS)	Zenon Nowosz (POL)	Jarkko Tapola (FIN)
1971 Sofia	Valeriy Borzov (URS)	Jobst Hirscht (FRG)	Manfred Kokot (GDR)
1972 Grenoble	Valeriy Borzov (URS)	Aleksandr Kornelyuk (URS)	Vasilis Papageorgopoulos (GRE)
1973 Rotterdam	Zenon Nowosz (POL)	Manfred Kokot (GDR)	Raimo Vilén (FIN)
1974 Gothenburg	Valeriy Borzov (URS)	Manfred Kokot (GDR)	Aleksandr Kornelyuk (URS)
1975 Katowice	Valeriy Borzov (URS)	Aleksandr Aksinin (URS)	Zenon Licznerski (POL)
1976 Munich	Valeriy Borzov (URS)	Vasilis Papageorgopoulos (GRE)	Petar Petrov (BUL)
1977 San Sebastián	Valeriy Borzov (URS)	Christer Garpenborg (SWE)	Marian Woronin (POL)
1978 Milan	Nikolay Kolesnikov (URS)	Petar Petrov (BUL)	Aleksandr Aksinin (URS)
1979 Vienna	Marian Woronin (POL)	Leszek Dunecki (POL)	Petar Petrov (BUL)
1980 Sindelfingen	Marian Woronin (POL)	Christian Haas (FRG)	Aleksandr Aksinin (URS)
1981 Grenoble	Marian Woronin (POL)	Vladimir Muravyov (URS)	Andrey Shlyapnikov (URS)
1982 Milan	Marian Woronin (POL)	Valentin Atanasov (BUL)	Bernard Petitbois (FRA)
1983 Budapest	Stefano Tilli (ITA)	Christian Haas (GER)	Valentin Atanasov (BUL)
1984 Gothenburg	Christian Haas (GER)	Antonio Ullo (ITA)	Ronald Desruelles (BEL)
1985 Piraeus	Mike McFarlane (GBR)	Antoine Richard (FRA)	Ronald Desruelles (BEL)
1986 Madrid	Ronald Desruelles (BEL)	Steffen Bringmann (GDR)	Bruno Marie-Rose (FRA)
1987 Liévin	Marian Woronin (POL)	Pierfrancesco Pavoni (ITA)	František Ptáčník (TCH); Antonio Ullo (ITA)
1988 Budapest	Linford Christie (GBR)	Ronald Desruelles (BEL)	Valentin Atanasov (BUL)
1989 The Hague	Andreas Berger (AUT)	Matthias Schlicht (FRG)	Michael Rosswess (GBR)
1990 Glasgow	Linford Christie (GBR)	Pierfrancesco Pavoni (ITA)	Jiří Valík (TCH)
1992 Genoa	Jason Livingston (GBR)	Vitaliy Savin (EUN)	Michael Rosswess (GBR)
1994 Paris	Colin Jackson (GBR)	Alexandros Terzian (GRE)	Michael Rosswess (GBR)
1996 Stockholm	Marc Blume (GER)	Jason John (GBR)	Peter Karlsson (SWE)
1998 Valencia	Angelos Pavlakakis (GRE)	Jason Gardener (GBR)	Stéphane Cali (FRA)
2000 Ghent	Jason Gardener (GBR)	Georgios Theodoridis (GRE)	Angelos Pavlakakis (GRE)
2002 Vienna	Jason Gardener (GBR)	Mark Lewis-Francis (GBR)	Anatoliy Dovhal (UKR)
2005 Madrid	Jason Gardener (GBR)	Ronald Pognon (FRA)	Kostyantyn Vasyukov (UKR)
2007 Birmingham	Jason Gardener (GBR)	Craig Pickering (GBR)	Ronald Pognon (FRA)
2009 Turin	Dwain Chambers (GBR)	Fabio Cerutti (ITA)	Emanuele Di Gregorio (ITA)
2011 Paris	Francis Obikwelu (POR)	Dwain Chambers (GBR)	Christophe Lemaitre (FRA)
2013 Gothenburg	Jimmy Vicaut (FRA)	James Dasaolu (GBR)	Michael Tumi (ITA)
2015 Prague	Richard Kilty (GBR)	Christian Blum (GER)	Julian Reus (GER)
2017 Belgrade	Richard Kilty (GBR)	Jan Volko (SVK)	Austin Hamilton (SWE)
2019 Glasgow	Ján Volko (SVK)	Emre Zafer Barnes (TUR)	Joris van Gool (NED)
2021 Toruń	Marcell Jacobs (ITA)	Kevin Kranz (GER)	Ján Volko (SVK)
2023 Istanbul	Samuele Ceccarelli (ITA)	Marcell Jacobs (ITA)	Henrik Larsson (SWE)
2025 Apeldoorn	Jeremiah Azu (GBR)	Henrik Larsson (SWE)	Andrew Robertson (GBR)

=== 400 m ===
Games	Gold	Silver	Bronze
European Indoor Games
1966 Dortmund	Hartmut Koch (GDR)	Manfred Kinder (FRG)	Vasyl Anisimov (URS)
1967 Prague	Manfred Kinder (FRG)	Hartmut Koch (GDR)	Nikolay Shkarnikov (URS)
1968 Madrid	Andrzej Badeński (POL)	Aleksandr Bratchikov (URS)	Jan Balachowski (POL)
1969 Belgrade	Jan Balachowski (POL)	Jan Werner (POL)	Yuriy Zorin (URS)
European Athletics Indoor Championships
1970 Vienna	Aleksandr Bratchikov (URS)	Andrzej Badeński (POL)	Yuriy Zorin (URS)
1971 Sofia	Andrzej Badeński (POL)	Boris Savchuk (URS)	Aleksandr Bratchikov (URS)
1972 Grenoble	Georg Nückles (FRG)	Ulrich Reich (FRG)	Wolfgang Müller (GDR)
1973 Rotterdam	Luciano Sušanj (YUG)	Benno Stops (GDR)	Dariusz Podobas (POL)
1974 Gothenburg	Fons Brijdenbach (BEL)	Andreas Scheibe (GDR)	Günter Arnold (GDR)
1975 Katowice	Hermann Köhler (FRG)	Josip Alebić (YUG)	Semyon Kocher (URS)
1976 Munich	Yanko Bratanov (BUL)	Hermann Köhler (FRG)	Grzegorz Mądry (POL)
1977 San Sebastián	Fons Brijdenbach (BEL)	Francis Demarthon (FRA)	Marian Gęsicki (POL)
1978 Milan	Pietro Mennea (ITA)	Ryszard Podlas (POL)	Nikolay Chernetskiy (URS)
1979 Vienna	Karel Kolář (TCH)	Stefano Malinverni (ITA)	Horia Toboc (ROU)
1980 Sindelfingen	Nikolay Chernetskiy (URS)	Karel Kolář (TCH)	Remigijus Valiulis (URS)
1981 Grenoble	Andreas Knebel (GDR)	Martin Weppler (FRG)	Stefano Malinverni (ITA)
1982 Milan	Pavel Konovalov (URS)	Sándor Újhelyi (HUN)	Benjamín González (ESP)
1983 Budapest	Yevgeniy Lomtev (URS)	Ainsley Bennett (GBR)	Ángel Heras (ESP)
1984 Gothenburg	Sergey Lovachov (URS)	Roberto Tozzi (ITA)	Didier Dubois (FRA)
1985 Piraeus	Todd Bennett (GBR)	Klaus Just (FRG)	José Alonso (ESP)
1986 Madrid	Thomas Schönlebe (GDR)	José Alonso (ESP)	Mathias Schersing (GDR)
1987 Liévin	Todd Bennett (GBR)	Momchil Kharizanov (BUL)	Paul Harmsworth (GBR)
1988 Budapest	Jens Carlowitz (GDR)	Brian Whittle (GBR)	Ralf Lübke (FRG)
1989 The Hague	Cayetano Cornet (ESP)	Brian Whittle (GBR)	Klaus Just (FRG)
1990 Glasgow	Norbert Dobeleit (FRG)	Jens Carlowitz (GDR)	Cayetano Cornet (ESP)
1992 Genoa	Slobodan Branković (YUG)	Andrea Nuti (ITA)	David Grindley (GBR)
1994 Paris	Du'aine Thorne-Ladejo (GBR)	Mikhail Vdovin (RUS)	Rico Lieder (GER)
1996 Stockholm	Du'aine Thorne-Ladejo (GBR)	Pierre-Marie Hilaire (FRA)	Ashraf Saber (ITA)
1998 Valencia	Ruslan Mashchenko (RUS)	Ashraf Saber (ITA)	Robert Maćkowiak (POL)
2000 Ghent	Iliya Dzhivondov (BUL)	David Canal (ESP)	Marc Raquil (FRA)
2002 Vienna	Marek Plawgo (POL)	Jimisola Laursen (SWE)	Ioan Vieru (ROU)
2005 Belgrade	David Gillick (IRL)	David Canal (ESP)	Sebastian Gatzka (GER)
2007 Madrid	David Gillick (IRL)	Bastian Swillims (GER)	Robert Tobin (GBR)
2009 Birmingham	Johan Wissman (SWE)	Claudio Licciardello (ITA)	Ioan Vieru (ROU)
2011 Turin	Leslie Djhone (FRA)	Thomas Schneider (GER)	Richard Buck (GBR)
2013 Paris	Pavel Maslák (CZE)	Nigel Levine (GBR)	Pavel Trenikhin (RUS)
2015 Prague	Pavel Maslák (CZE)	Dylan Borlée (BEL)	Rafał Omelko (POL)
2017 Belgrade	Pavel Maslák (CZE)	Rafał Omelko (POL)	Liemarvin Bonevacia (NED)
2019 Glasgow	Karsten Warholm (NOR)	Óscar Husillos (ESP)	Tony van Diepen (NED)
2021 Toruń	Óscar Husillos (ESP)	Tony van Diepen (NED)	Liemarvin Bonevacia (NED)
2023 Istanbul	Karsten Warholm (NOR)	Julien Watrin (BEL)	Carl Bengtström (SWE)
2025 Apeldoorn	Attila Molnár (HUN)	Maksymilian Szwed (POL)	Jimy Soudril (FRA)

=== 800 m ===
Games	Gold	Silver	Bronze
European Indoor Games
1966 Dortmund	Noel Carroll (IRL)	Tomáš Jungwirth (TCH)	Herbert Missalla (FRG)
1967 Prague	Noel Carroll (IRL)	Tomáš Jungwirth (TCH)	Jan Kasal (TCH)
1968 Madrid	Noel Carroll (IRL)	Alberto Estebán (ESP)	Sergey Kryuchok (URS)
1969 Belgrade	Dieter Fromm (GDR)	Henryk Szordykowski (POL)	Noel Carroll (IRL)
European Athletics Indoor Championships
1970 Vienna	Yevgeniy Arzhanov (URS)	Juan Borroz (ESP)	Jože Međimurec (YUG)
1971 Sofia	Yevgeniy Arzhanov (URS)	Phil Lewis (GBR)	Andrzej Kupczyk (POL)
1972 Grenoble	Jozef Plachý (TCH)	Ivan Ivanov (URS)	Francis Gonzalez (FRA)
1973 Rotterdam	Francis Gonzalez (FRA)	Gerhard Stolle (GDR)	Jozef Plachý (TCH)
1974 Gothenburg	Luciano Sušanj (YUG)	András Zsinka (HUN)	Jozef Plachý (TCH)
1975 Katowice	Gerhard Stolle (GDR)	Ivo Van Damme (BEL)	Vladimir Ponomaryov (URS)
1976 Munich	Ivo Van Damme (BEL)	Josef Schmid (FRG)	Milovan Savić (YUG)
1977 San Sebastián	Sebastian Coe (GBR)	Erwin Gohlke (GDR)	Rolf Gysin (SUI)
1978 Milan	Markku Taskinen (FIN)	Olaf Beyer (GDR)	Roger Milhau (FRA)
1979 Vienna	Antonio Páez (ESP)	Binko Kolev (BUL)	András Paróczai (HUN)
1980 Sindelfingen	Roger Milhau (FRA)	András Paróczai (HUN)	Herbert Wursthorn (FRG)
1981 Grenoble	Herbert Wursthorn (FRG)	András Paróczai (HUN)	Antonio Páez (ESP)
1982 Milan	Antonio Páez (ESP)	Klaus-Peter Nabein (FRG)	Colomán Trabado (ESP)
1983 Budapest	Colomán Trabado (ESP)	Peter Elliott (GBR)	Thierry Tonnelier (FRA)
1984 Gothenburg	Donato Sabia (ITA)	André Lavie (FRA)	Phil Norgate (GBR)
1985 Piraeus	Rob Harrison (GBR)	Petru Drăgoescu (ROU)	Leonid Masunov (URS)
1986 Madrid	Peter Braun (FRG)	Colomán Trabado (ESP)	Thierry Tonnelier (FRA)
1987 Liévin	Rob Druppers (NED)	Vladimir Graudyn (URS)	Ari Suhonen (FIN)
1988 Budapest	David Sharpe (GBR)	Rob Druppers (NED)	Gert Kilbert (SUI)
1989 The Hague	Steve Heard (GBR)	Rob Druppers (NED)	Joachim Heydgen (GDR)
1990 Glasgow	Tom McKean (GBR)	Tomás de Teresa (ESP)	Zbigniew Janus (POL)
1992 Genoa	Luis Javier González (ESP)	José Arconada (ESP)	David Grindley (ITA)
1994 Paris	Andrey Loginov (RUS)	Luis Javier González (ESP)	Ousmane Diarra (FRA)
1996 Stockholm	Roberto Parra (ESP)	Giuseppe D'Urso (ITA)	Wojciech Kałdowski (POL)
1998 Valencia	Nils Schumann (GER)	Marko Koers (NED)	Vebjørn Rodal (NOR)
2000 Ghent	Yuriy Borzakovskiy (RUS)	Nils Schumann (GER)	Balázs Korányi (HUN)
2002 Vienna	Paweł Czapiewski (POL)	André Bucher (SUI)	Antonio Manuel Reina (ESP)
2005 Belgrade	Dmitriy Bogdanov (RUS)	Antonio Manuel Reina (ESP)	Juan de Dios Jurado (ESP)
2007 Madrid	Arnoud Okken (NED)	Miguel Quesada (ESP)	Maurizio Bobbato (ITA)
2009 Birmingham	Yuriy Borzakovskiy (RUS)	Luis Alberto Marco (ESP)	Mattias Claesson (SWE)
2011 Turin	Adam Kszczot (POL)	Marcin Lewandowski (POL)	Kevin López (ESP)
2013 Paris	Adam Kszczot (POL)	Kevin López (ESP)	Mukhtar Mohammed (GBR)
2015 Prague	Marcin Lewandowski (POL)	Mark English (IRL)	Thijmen Kupers (NED)
2017 Belgrade	Adam Kszczot (POL)	Andreas Bube (DEN)	Alvaro de Arriba (ESP)
2019 Glasgow	Alvaro de Arriba (ESP)	Jamie Webb (GBR)	Mark English (IRL)
2021 Toruń	Patryk Dobek (POL)	Mateusz Borkowski (POL)	Jamie Webb (GBR)
2023 Istanbul	Adrián Ben (ESP)	Benjamin Robert (FRA)	Eliott Crestan (BEL)
2025 Apeldoorn	Samuel Chapple (NED)	Eliott Crestan (BEL)	Mark English (IRL)

=== 1500 m ===
Games	Gold	Silver	Bronze
European Indoor Games
1966 Dortmund	John Whetton (GBR)	Oleg Rayko (URS)	Ulf Högberg (SWE)
1967 Prague	John Whetton (GBR)	Josef Odložil (TCH)	Stanislav Hoffman (TCH)
1968 Madrid	John Whetton (GBR)	José María Morera (ESP)	Igor Potapchenko (URS)
1969 Belgrade	Edgard Salvé (BEL)	Knut Brustad (NOR)	Walter Wilkinson (GBR)
European Athletics Indoor Championships
1970 Vienna	Henryk Szordykowski (POL)	Frank Murphy (IRL)	Volodymyr Panteley (URS)
1971 Sofia	Henryk Szordykowski (POL)	Volodymyr Panteley (URS)	Gianni Del Buono (ITA)
1972 Grenoble	Jacky Boxberger (FRA)	Spylios Zacharopoulos (GRE)	Jürgen May (FRG)
1973 Rotterdam	Henryk Szordykowski (POL)	Herman Mignon (BEL)	Klaus-Peter Justus (GDR)
1974 Gothenburg	Henryk Szordykowski (POL)	Thomas Wessinghage (FRG)	Włodzimierz Staszak (POL)
1975 Katowice	Thomas Wessinghage (FRG)	Pyotr Anisim (URS)	Gheorghe Ghipu (ROU)
1976 Munich	Paul-Heinz Wellmann (FRG)	Thomas Wessinghage (FRG)	Gheorghe Ghipu (ROU)
1977 San Sebastián	Jürgen Straub (GDR)	Paul-Heinz Wellmann (FRG)	János Zemen (HUN)
1978 Milan	Antti Loikkanen (FIN)	Thomas Wessinghage (FRG)	Jürgen Straub (GDR)
1979 Vienna	Eamonn Coghlan (IRL)	Thomas Wessinghage (FRG)	John Robson (GBR)
1980 Sindelfingen	Thomas Wessinghage (FRG)	Ray Flynn (IRL)	Pierre Délèze (SUI)
1981 Grenoble	Thomas Wessinghage (FRG)	Uwe Becker (FRG)	Mirosław Żerkowski (POL)
1982 Milan	José Luis González (ESP)	José Manuel Abascal (ESP)	Antti Loikkanen (FIN)
1983 Budapest	Thomas Wessinghage (FRG)	José Manuel Abascal (ESP)	Antti Loikkanen (FIN)
1984 Gothenburg	Peter Wirz (SUI)	Riccardo Materazzi (ITA)	Thomas Wessinghage (FRG)
1985 Piraeus	José Luis González (ESP)	Marcus O'Sullivan (IRL)	José Luis Carreira (ESP)
1986 Madrid	José Luis González (ESP)	José Luis Carreira (ESP)	Han Kulker (NED)
1987 Liévin	Han Kulker (NED)	Jens-Peter Herold (GDR)	Klaus-Peter Nabein (FRG)
1988 Budapest	Ari Suhonen (FIN)	Ronny Olsson (SWE)	Rüdiger Horn (GDR)
1989 The Hague	Hervé Phélippeau (FRA)	Han Kulker (NED)	Sergey Afanasyev (URS)
1990 Glasgow	Jens-Peter Herold (GDR)	Fermín Cacho (ESP)	Tony Morrell (GBR)
1992 Genoa	Matthew Yates (GBR)	Sergey Melnikov (EUN)	Branko Zorko (CRO)
1994 Paris	David Strang (GBR)	Branko Zorko (CRO)	Kader Chékhémani (FRA)
1996 Stockholm	Mateo Cañellas (ESP)	Anthony Whiteman (GBR)	Kader Chékhémani (FRA)
1998 Valencia	Rui Silva (POR)	Kader Chékhémani (FRA)	Andrey Zadorozhniy (RUS)
2000 Ghent	José Antonio Redolat (ESP)	James Nolan (IRL)	Mehdi Baala (FRA)
2002 Vienna	Rui Silva (POR)	Juan Carlos Higuero (ESP)	Michael East (GBR)
2005 Belgrade	Ivan Heshko (UKR)	Juan Carlos Higuero (ESP)	Reyes Estévez (ESP)
2007 Madrid	Juan Carlos Higuero (ESP)	Sergio Gallardo (ESP)	Arturo Casado (ESP)
2009 Birmingham	Rui Silva (POR)	Diego Ruíz (ESP)	Yoann Kowal (FRA)
2011 Turin	Manuel Olmedo (ESP)	Kemal Koyuncu (TUR)	Bartosz Nowicki (POL)
2013 Paris	Mahiedine Mekhissi-Benabbad (FRA)	İlham Tanui Özbilen (TUR)	Simon Denissel (FRA)
2015 Prague	Jakub Holuša (CZE)	İlham Tanui Özbilen (TUR)	Chris O'Hare (GBR)
2017 Belgrade	Marcin Lewandowski (POL)	Kalle Berglund (SWE)	Filip Sasinek (CZE)
2019 Glasgow	Marcin Lewandowski (POL)	Jakob Ingebrigtsen (NOR)	Jesús Gómez (ESP)
2021 Toruń	Jakob Ingebrigtsen (NOR)	Marcin Lewandowski (POL)	Jesús Gómez (ESP)
2023 Istanbul	Jakob Ingebrigtsen (NOR)	Neil Gourley (GBR)	Azeddine Habz (FRA)
2025 Apeldoorn	Jakob Ingebrigtsen (NOR)	Azeddine Habz (FRA)	Isaac Nader (POR)

=== 3000 m ===
Games	Gold	Silver	Bronze
European Indoor Games
1966 Dortmund	Harald Norpoth (FRG)	Siegfried Herrmann (GDR)	István Kiss (HUN)
1967 Prague	Werner Girke (FRG)	Rashid Sharafetdinov (URS)	Lajos Mecser (HUN)
1968 Madrid	Viktor Kudinskiy (URS)	Bernd Diessner (GDR)	Wolfgang Zur (FRG)
1969 Belgrade	Ian Stewart (GBR)	Javier Álvarez (ESP)	Werner Girke (FRG)
European Athletics Indoor Championships
1970 Vienna	Ricky Wilde (GBR)	Harald Norpoth (FRG)	Javier Álvarez (ESP)
1971 Sofia	Peter Stewart (GBR)	Wilfried Scholz (GDR)	Yuriy Aleksashin (URS)
1972 Grenoble	Juris Grustins (URS)	Yuriy Aleksashin (URS)	Ulrich Brugger (FRG)
1973 Rotterdam	Emiel Puttemans (BEL)	Willy Polleunis (BEL)	Pekka Päivärinta (FIN)
1974 Gothenburg	Emiel Puttemans (BEL)	Paul Thijs (BEL)	Pavel Pěnkava (TCH)
1975 Katowice	Ian Stewart (GBR)	Pekka Päivärinta (FIN)	Boris Kuznetsov (URS)
1976 Munich	Ingo Sensburg (FRG)	Józef Ziubrak (POL)	Ray Smedley (GBR)
1977 San Sebastián	Karl Fleschen (FRG)	Pekka Päivärinta (FIN)	Markus Ryffel (SUI)
1978 Milan	Markus Ryffel (SUI)	Emiel Puttemans (BEL)	Jörg Peter (GDR)
1979 Vienna	Markus Ryffel (SUI)	Christoph Herle (FRG)	Aleksandr Fedotkin (URS)
1980 Sindelfingen	Karl Fleschen (FRG)	Klaas Lok (NED)	Hans-Jürgen Orthmann (FRG)
1981 Grenoble	Alex Gonzalez (FRA)	Evgeni Ignatov (BUL)	Valeriy Abramov (URS)
1982 Milan	Patriz Ilg (FRG)	Alberto Cova (ITA)	Valeriy Abramov (URS)
1983 Budapest	Dragan Zdravković (YUG)	Valeriy Abramov (URS)	Uwe Mönkemeyer (FRG)
1984 Gothenburg	Lubomír Tesáček (TCH)	Markus Ryffel (SUI)	Karl Fleschen (FRG)
1985 Piraeus	Bob Verbeeck (BEL)	Thomas Wessinghage (FRG)	Vitaliy Tyshchenko (URS)
1986 Madrid	Dietmar Millonig (AUT)	Stefano Mei (ITA)	João Campos (POR)
1987 Liévin	José Luis González (ESP)	Dieter Baumann (FRG)	Pascal Thiébaut (FRA)
1988 Budapest	José Luis González (ESP)	Markus Hacksteiner (SUI)	Mikhail Dasko (URS)
1989 The Hague	Dieter Baumann (FRG)	Abel Antón (ESP)	Jacky Carlier (FRA)
1990 Glasgow	Éric Dubus (FRA)	Jacky Carlier (FRA)	Branko Zorko (YUG)
1992 Genoa	Gennaro Di Napoli (ITA)	John Mayock (GBR)	José Luís González (ESP)
1994 Paris	Kim Bauermeister (GER)	Ovidiu Olteanu (ROU)	Rod Finch (GBR)
1996 Stockholm	Anacleto Jiménez (ESP)	Christophe Impens (BEL)	Panagiotis Papoulias (GRE)
1998 Valencia	John Mayock (GBR)	Manuel Pancorbo (ESP)	Alberto García (ESP)
2000 Ghent	Mark Carroll (IRL)	Rui Silva (POR)	John Mayock (GBR)
2002 Vienna	Alberto García (ESP)	Antonio David Jiménez (ESP)	Jesus España (ESP); John Mayock (GBR)
2005 Belgrade	Alistair Cragg (IRL)	John Mayock (GBR)	Reyes Estévez (ESP)
2007 Madrid	Cosimo Caliandro (ITA)	Bouabdellah Tahri (FRA)	Jesús España (ESP)
2009 Birmingham	Mo Farah (GBR)	Bouabdellah Tahri (FRA)	Jesús España (ESP)
2011 Turin	Mo Farah (GBR)	Hayle Ibrahimov (AZE)	Halil Akkas (TUR)
2013 Paris	Hayle Ibrahimov (AZE)	Juan Carlos Higuero (ESP)	Ciarán O'Lionáird (IRL)
2015 Prague	Ali Kaya (TUR)	Lee Emanuel (GBR)	Henrik Ingebrigtsen (NOR)
2017 Belgrade	Adel Mechaal (ESP)	Henrik Ingebrigtsen (NOR)	Richard Ringer (GER)
2019 Glasgow	Jakob Ingebrigtsen (NOR)	Chris O'Hare (GBR)	Henrik Ingebrigtsen (NOR)
2021 Toruń	Jakob Ingebrigtsen (NOR)	Isaac Kimeli (BEL)	Adel Mechaal (ESP)
2023 Istanbul	Jakob Ingebrigtsen (NOR)	Adel Mechaal (ESP)	Elzan Bibić (SRB)
2025 Apeldoorn	Jakob Ingebrigtsen (NOR)	George Mills (GBR)	Azeddine Habz (FRA)

=== 60 m hurdles ===
Games	Gold	Silver	Bronze
European Indoor Games
1966 Dortmund	Eddy Ottoz (ITA)	Michael Parker (GBR)	Hinrich John (FRG)
1967 Prague	Eddy Ottoz (ITA)	Valentin Chistyakov (URS)	Anatoliy Mikhailov (URS)
1968 Madrid	Eddy Ottoz (ITA)	Günther Nickel (FRG)	Milan Kotík (TCH)
1969 Belgrade	Alan Pascoe (GBR)	Werner Trzmiel (FRG)	Nicolae Pertea (ROU)
European Athletics Indoor Championships
1970 Vienna	Günther Nickel (FRG)	Frank Siebeck (GDR)	Guy Drut (FRA)
1971 Sofia	Eckart Berkes (FRG)	Aleksandr Demus (URS)	Sergio Liani (ITA)
1972 Grenoble	Guy Drut (FRA)	Manfred Schumann (FRG)	Anatoliy Moshiashvili (URS)
1973 Rotterdam	Frank Siebeck (GDR)	Adam Galant (POL)	Thomas Munkelt (GDR)
1974 Gothenburg	Anatoliy Moshiashvili (URS)	Mirosław Wodzyński (POL)	Frank Siebeck (GDR)
1975 Katowice	Leszek Wodzyński (POL)	Frank Siebeck (GDR)	Eduard Pereverzev (URS)
1976 Munich	Viktor Myasnikov (URS)	Berwyn Price (GBR)	Zbigniew Jankowski (POL)
1977 San Sebastián	Thomas Munkelt (GDR)	Viktor Myasnikov (URS)	Arto Bryggare (FIN)
1978 Milan	Thomas Munkelt (GDR)	Vyacheslav Kulebyakin (URS)	Giuseppe Buttari (ITA)
1979 Vienna	Thomas Munkelt (GDR)	Arto Bryggare (FIN)	Eduard Pereverzev (URS)
1980 Sindelfingen	Yuriy Chervanyov (URS)	Romuald Giegiel (POL)	Javier Moracho (ESP)
1981 Grenoble	Arto Bryggare (FIN)	Javier Moracho (ESP)	Guy Drut (FRA)
1982 Milan	Aleksandr Puchkov (URS)	Plamen Krastev (BUL)	Karl-Werner Dönges (FRG)
1983 Budapest	Thomas Munkelt (GDR)	Arto Bryggare (FIN)	Andreas Oschkenat (GDR)
1984 Gothenburg	Romuald Giegiel (POL)	György Bakos (HUN)	Jiří Hudec (TCH)
1985 Piraeus	György Bakos (HUN)	Jiří Hudec (TCH)	Vyacheslav Ustinov (URS)
1986 Madrid	Javier Moracho (ESP)	Daniele Fontecchio (ITA)	Holger Pohland (GDR)
1987 Liévin	Arto Bryggare (FIN)	Colin Jackson (GBR)	Nigel Walker (GBR)
1988 Budapest	Aleš Höffer (TCH)	Jon Ridgeon (GBR)	Carlos Sala (ESP)
1989 The Hague	Colin Jackson (GBR)	Holger Pohland (GDR)	Philippe Tourret (FRA)
1990 Glasgow	Igors Kazanovs (URS)	Tony Jarrett (GBR)	Florian Schwarthoff (GER)
1992 Genoa	Igors Kazanovs (LAT)	Tomasz Nagórka (POL)	Jiří Hudec (TCH)
1994 Paris	Colin Jackson (GBR)	Gheorghe Boroi (ROU)	Mike Fenner (GER)
1996 Stockholm	Igors Kazanovs (LAT)	Guntis Peders (LAT)	Jonathan N'Senga (BEL)
1998 Valencia	Igors Kazanovs (LAT)	Tomasz Ścigaczewski (POL)	Mike Fenner (GER)
2000 Ghent	Staņislavs Olijars (LAT)	Tony Jarrett (GBR)	Tomasz Ścigaczewski (POL)
2002 Vienna	Colin Jackson (GBR)	Elmar Lichtenegger (AUT)	Staņislavs Olijars (LAT)
2005 Belgrade	Ladji Doucouré (FRA)	Felipe Vivancos (ESP)	Robert Kronberg (SWE)
2007 Madrid	Gregory Sedoc (NED)	Marcel van der Westen (NED)	Jackson Quiñónez (ESP)
2009 Birmingham	Ladji Doucouré (FRA)	Gregory Sedoc (NED)	Petr Svoboda (CZE)
2011 Turin	Petr Svoboda (CZE)	Garfield Darien (FRA)	Adrien Deghelt (BEL)
2013 Paris	Sergey Shubenkov (RUS)	Paolo Dal Molin (ITA)	Pascal Martinot-Lagarde (FRA)
2015 Prague	Pascal Martinot-Lagarde (FRA)	Dimitri Bascou (FRA)	Wilhem Belocian (FRA)
2017 Belgrade	Andy Pozzi (GBR)	Pascal Martinot-Lagarde (FRA)	Petr Svoboda (CZE)
2019 Glasgow	Milan Trajkovic (CYP)	Pascal Martinot-Lagarde (FRA)	Aurel Manga (FRA)
2021 Toruń	Wilhem Belocian (FRA)	Andrew Pozzi (GBR)	Paolo Dal Molin (ITA)
2023 Istanbul	Jason Joseph (SWI)	Jakub Szymański (POL)	Just Kwaou-Mathey (FRA)
2025 Apeldoorn	Jakub Szymański (POL)	Wilhem Belocian (FRA)	Just Kwaou-Mathey (FRA)

=== 4 × 400 m relay ===
Games	Gold	Silver	Bronze
2000 Ghent	Czech Republic; Jiří Mužík; Jan Poděbradský; Štěpán Tesařík; Karel Bláha	Germany; Ingo Schultz; Ruwen Faller; Marco Krause; Lars Figura	Hungary; Péter Nyilasi; Attila Kilvinger; Zétény Dombi; Tibor Bedi
2002 Vienna	Poland; Marek Plawgo; Piotr Rysiukiewicz; Artur Gąsiewski; Robert Maćkowiak	France; Marc Foucan; Laurent Claudel; Loic Lerouge; Stephane Diagana	Spain; Carlos Meléndez; David Canal; Salvador Rodríguez; Alberto Martínez
2005 Belgrade	France; Richard Maunier; Remi Wallard; Brice Panel; Marc Raquil	Great Britain; Dale Garland; Daniel Cossins; Richard Davenport; Gareth Warburton	Russia; Andrey Polukeyev; Aleksandr Usov; Dmitriy Forshev; Alexander Borshchenko
2007 Madrid	Great Britain; Dale Garland; Robert Tobin; Philip Taylor; Steven Green	Russia; Ivan Buzolin; Vladislav Frolov; Maksim Dyldin; Artem Sergeyenkov	Poland; Piotr Kędzia; Marcin Marciniszyn; Łukasz Pryga; Piotr Klimczak
2009 Birmingham	Italy; Jacopo Marin; Matteo Galvan; Domenico Rao; Claudio Licciardello	Great Britain; Richard Buck; Nick Leavey; Nigel Levine; Philip Taylor	Poland; Jan Ciepiela; Marcin Marciniszyn; Jarosław Wasiak; Piotr Klimczak
2011 Turin	France; Marc Macedot; Leslie Djhone; Mamoudou Hanne; Yoan Décimus	Great Britain; Nigel Levine; Nick Leavey; Richard Strachan; Richard Buck	Belgium; Jonathan Borlée; Antoine Gillet; Nils Duerinck; Kevin Borlée
2013 Paris	Great Britain; Nigel Levine; Michael Bingham; Richard Strachan; Richard Buck	Russia; Pavel Trenikhin; Yuriy Trambovetskiy; Konstantin Svechkar; Vladimir Krasnov	Czech Republic; Daniel Němeček; Josef Prorok; Petr Lichý; Pavel Maslák
2015 Prague	Belgium; Julien Watrin; Dylan Borlée; Jonathan Borlée; Kevin Borlée	Poland; Karol Zalewski; Rafał Omelko; Łukasz Krawczuk; Jakub Krzewina	Czech Republic; Daniel Němeček; Patrik Šorm; Jan Tesař; Pavel Maslák
2017 Belgrade	Poland; Kacper Kozłowski; Łukasz Krawczuk; Przemysław Waściński; Rafał Omelko	Belgium; Robin van Derbemden; Julien Watrin; Dylan Borlée; Kevin Borlée	Czech Republic; Patrik Šorm; Jan Tesař; Jan Kubista; Pavel Maslák
2019 Glasgow	Belgium; Julien Watrin; Jonathan Borlée; Dylan Borlée; Kevin Borlée	Spain; Óscar Husillos; Manuel Guijarro; Lucas Búa; Bernat Erta	France; Mame-Ibra Anne; Thomas Jordier; Nicolas Courbiere; Fabrisio Saidy
2021 Toruń	Netherlands; Jochem Dobber; Liemarvin Bonevacia; Ramsey Angela; Tony van Diepen	Czech Republic; Vít Müller; Pavel Maslák; Michal Desenský; Patrik Šorm	Great Britain; Joe Brier; Owen Smith; James Williams; Lee Thompson
2023 Istanbul	Belgium; Dylan Borlée; Alexander Doom; Kevin Borlée; Julien Watrin	France; Gilles Biron; Téo Andant; Victor Coroller; Muhammad Abdallah Kounta	Netherlands; Isayah Boers; Isaya Klein Ikkink; Ramsey Angela; Liemarvin Bonevacia
2025 Apeldoorn	Netherlands; Eugene Omalla; Nick Smidt; Isaya Klein Ikkink; Tony van Diepen	Spain; Markel Fernandez; Manuel Guijarro; Óscar Husillos; Bernat Erta	Belgium; Julien Watrin; Christian Iguacel; Florent Mabille; Jonathan Sacoor

== Field ==
=== High jump ===
Games	Gold	Silver	Bronze
European Indoor Games
1966 Dortmund	Valeriy Skvortsov (URS)	Wolfgang Schillkowski (FRG)	Kjell-Åke Nilsson (SWE)
1967 Prague	Anatoliy Moroz (URS)	Henry Elliot (FRA)	Rudolf Baudiš (TCH)
1968 Madrid	Valeriy Skvortsov (URS)	Valentin Gavrilov (URS)	Kenneth Lundmark (SWE)
1969 Belgrade	Valentin Gavrilov (URS)	Henry Elliot (FRA)	Șerban Ioan (ROU)
European Athletics Indoor Championships
1970 Vienna	Valentin Gavrilov (URS)	Gerd Dührkop (GDR)	Șerban Ioan (ROU)
1971 Sofia	István Major (HUN)	Jüri Tarmak (URS)	Endre Kelemen (HUN)
1972 Grenoble	István Major (HUN)	Kestutis Sapka (URS)	Jüri Tarmak (URS)
1973 Rotterdam	István Major (HUN)	Jiří Palkovský (TCH)	Vassilios Papadimitriou (GRE)
1974 Gothenburg	Kestutis Sapka (URS)	István Major (HUN)	Vladimír Malý (TCH)
1975 Katowice	Vladimír Malý (TCH)	Endre Kelemen (HUN)	Rune Almén (SWE)
1976 Munich	Sergey Senyukov (URS)	Jacques Aletti (FRA)	Walter Boller (FRG)
1977 San Sebastián	Jacek Wszoła (POL)	Rolf Beilschmidt (GDR)	Ruud Wielart (NED)
1978 Milan	Vladimir Yashchenko (URS)	Rolf Beilschmidt (GDR)	Wolfgang Killing (FRG)
1979 Vienna	Vladimir Yashchenko (URS)	Gennadiy Belkov (URS)	Andre Schneider-Laub (FRG)
1980 Sindelfingen	Dietmar Mögenburg (FRG)	Jacek Wszoła (POL)	Adrian Proteasa (ROU)
1981 Grenoble	Roland Dalhäuser (SUI)	Carlo Thränhardt (FRG)	Dietmar Mögenburg (FRG)
1982 Milan	Dietmar Mögenburg (FRG)	Janusz Trzepizur (POL)	Roland Dalhäuser (SUI)
1983 Budapest	Carlo Thränhardt (FRG)	Gerd Nagel (FRG)	Massimo Di Giorgio (ITA); Mirosław Włodarczyk (POL)
1984 Gothenburg	Dietmar Mögenburg (FRG)	Carlo Thränhardt (FRG)	Roland Dalhäuser (SUI)
1985 Piraeus	Patrik Sjöberg (SWE)	Aleksandr Kotovich (URS)	Dariusz Biczysko (POL)
1986 Madrid	Dietmar Mögenburg (FRG)	Carlo Thränhardt (FRG)	Eddy Annys (BEL); Geoff Parsons (GBR)
1987 Liévin	Patrik Sjöberg (SWE)	Carlo Thränhardt (FRG)	Hennadiy Avdyeyenko (URS)
1988 Budapest	Patrik Sjöberg (SWE)	Dietmar Mögenburg (FRG)	Sorin Matei (ROU)
1989 The Hague	Dietmar Mögenburg (FRG)	Dalton Grant (GBR)	Aleksey Yemelin (URS)
1990 Glasgow	Artur Partyka (POL)	Arturo Ortiz (ESP)	Dietmar Mögenburg (FRG); Gerd Nagel (FRG)
1992 Genoa	Patrik Sjöberg (SWE)	Sorin Matei (ROU)	Ralf Sonn (GER); Dragutin Topić (YUG)
1994 Paris	Dalton Grant (GBR)	Jean-Charles Gicquel (FRA)	Wolf-Hendrik Beyer (GER)
1996 Stockholm	Dragutin Topić (YUG)	Leonid Pumalainen (RUS)	Steinar Hoen (NOR)
1998 Valencia	Artur Partyka (POL)	Vyacheslav Voronin (RUS)	Tomáš Janků (CZE)
2000 Ghent	Vyacheslav Voronin (RUS)	Martin Buss (GER)	Dragutin Topić (YUG)
2002 Vienna	Staffan Strand (SWE)	Stefan Holm (SWE)	Yaroslav Rybakov (RUS)
2005 Belgrade	Stefan Holm (SWE)	Yaroslav Rybakov (RUS)	Pavel Fomenko (RUS)
2007 Madrid	Stefan Holm (SWE)	Linus Thörnblad (SWE)	Martyn Bernard (GBR)
2009 Birmingham	Ivan Ukhov (RUS)	Kyriakos Ioannou (CYP); Aleksey Dmitrik (RUS)	—
2011 Turin	Ivan Ukhov (RUS)	Jaroslav Bába (CZE)	Aleksandr Shustov (RUS)
2013 Paris	Sergey Mudrov (RUS)	Aleksey Dmitrik (RUS)	Jaroslav Bába (CZE)
2015 Prague	Daniil Tsyplakov (RUS)	Silvano Chesani (ITA); Antonios Mastoras (GRE)	—
2017 Belgrade	Sylwester Bednarek (POL)	Robbie Grabarz (GBR)	Pavel Selivertsau (BLR)
2019 Glasgow	Gianmarco Tamberi (ITA)	Konstadinos Baniotis (GRE); Andriy Protsenko (UKR)	—
2021 Toruń	Maksim Nedasekau (BLR)	Gianmarco Tamberi (ITA)	Thomas Carmoy (BEL)
2023 Istanbul	Douwe Amels (NED)	Andriy Protsenko (UKR)	Thomas Carmoy (BEL)
2025 Apeldoorn	Oleh Doroshchuk (UKR)	Jan Štefela (CZE)	Matteo Sioli (ITA)

=== Long jump ===
Games	Gold	Silver	Bronze
European Indoor Games
1966 Dortmund	Igor Ter-Ovanesyan (URS)	Armin Baumert (FRG)	Jochen Eigenherr (FRG)
1967 Prague	Lynn Davies (GBR)	Leonid Barkovskyy (URS)	Andrzej Stalmach (POL)
1968 Madrid	Igor Ter-Ovanesyan (URS)	Tonu Lepik (URS)	Bernhard Stierle (FRG)
1969 Belgrade	Klaus Beer (GDR)	Lynn Davies (GBR)	Rafael Blanquer (ESP)
European Athletics Indoor Championships
1970 Vienna	Tonu Lepik (URS)	Klaus Beer (GDR)	Rafael Blanquer (ESP)
1971 Sofia	Hans Baumgartner (FRG)	Igor Ter-Ovanesyan (URS)	Vasile Sarucan (ROU)
1972 Grenoble	Max Klauss (GDR)	Hans Baumgartner (FRG)	Jaroslav Brož (TCH)
1973 Rotterdam	Hans Baumgartner (FRG)	Max Klauss (GDR)	Grzegorz Cybulski (POL)
1974 Gothenburg	Jean-François Bonheme (FRA)	Hans Baumgartner (FRG)	Max Klauss (GDR)
1975 Katowice	Jacques Rousseau (FRA)	Hans-Jürgen Berger (FRG)	Zbigniew Beta (POL)
1976 Munich	Jacques Rousseau (FRA)	Valeriy Podluzhniy (URS)	Joachim Busse (FRG)
1977 San Sebastián	Hans Baumgartner (FRG)	Lutz Franke (GDR)	Laszlo Szalma (HUN)
1978 Milan	Laszlo Szalma (HUN)	Ronald Desruelles (BEL)	Vladimir Tsepelyov (URS)
1979 Vienna	Vladimir Tsepelyov (URS)	Valeriy Podluzhniy (URS)	Lutz Franke (GDR)
1980 Sindelfingen	Winfried Klepsch (FRG)	Nenad Stekić (YUG)	Stanisław Jaskułka (POL)
1981 Grenoble	Rolf Bernhard (SUI)	Carlo Thränhardt (FRG)	Dietmar Mögenburg (FRG)
1982 Milan	Henry Lauterbach (GDR)	Rolf Bernhard (SUI)	Giovanni Evangelisti (ITA)
1983 Budapest	Laszlo Szalma (HUN)	Gyula Pálóczi (HUN)	Jens Knipphals (FRG)
1984 Gothenburg	Jan Leitner (TCH)	Mathias Koch (GDR)	Robert Emmiyan (URS)
1985 Piraeus	Gyula Pálóczi (HUN)	László Szalma (HUN)	Sergey Layevskiy (URS)
1986 Madrid	Robert Emmiyan (URS)	László Szalma (HUN)	Jan Leitner (TCH)
1987 Liévin	José Luis González (runner) (ESP)	Dieter Baumann (FRG)	Pascal Thiébaut (FRA)
1988 Budapest	Frans Maas (NED)	László Szalma (HUN)	Giovanni Evangelisti (ITA)
1989 The Hague	Emiel Mellaard (NED)	Antonio Corgos (ESP)	Frans Maas (NED)
1990 Glasgow	Dietmar Haaf (FRG)	Emiel Mellaard (NED)	Robert Emmiyan (URS)
1992 Genoa	Dmitry Bagryanov (EUN)	Konstantin Krause (GER)	Jarmo Kärnä (FIN)
1994 Paris	Dietmar Haaf (GER)	Kostas Koukodimos (GRE)	Bogdan Tarus (ROU)
1996 Stockholm	Mattias Sunneborn (SWE)	Bogdan Tarus (ROU)	Spyridon Vasdekis (GRE)
1998 Valencia	Olexiy Lukashevych (UKR)	Carlos Calado (POR)	Emmanuel Bangué (FRA)
2000 Ghent	Petar Dachev (BUL)	Bogdan Tarus (ROU)	Vitaliy Shkurlatov (RUS)
2002 Vienna	Raúl Fernández (ESP)	Yago Lamela (ESP)	Petar Dachev (BUL)
2005 Belgrade	Joan Lino Martínez (ESP)	Bogdan Tarus (ROU)	Volodymyr Zyuskov (UKR)
2007 Madrid	Andrew Howe (ITA)	Loúis Tsátoumas (GRE)	Salim Sdiri (FRA)
2009 Birmingham	Sebastian Bayer (GER)	Nils Winter (GER)	Marcin Starzak (POL)
2011 Turin	Sebastian Bayer (GER)	Kafétien Gomis (FRA)	Morten Jensen (DEN)
2013 Paris	Aleksandr Menkov (RUS)	Michel Tornéus (SWE)	Christian Reif (GER)
2015 Prague	Michel Tornéus (SWE)	Radek Juška (CZE)	Andreas Otterling (SWE)
2017 Belgrade	Izmir Smajlaj (ALB)	Michel Tornéus (SWE)	Serhiy Nykyforov (UKR)
2019 Glasgow	Miltiadis Tentoglou (GRE)	Thobias Montler (SWE)	Strahinja Jovančević (SRB)
2021 Toruń	Miltiadis Tentoglou (GRE)	Thobias Montler (SWE)	Kristian Pulli (FIN)
2023 Istanbul	Miltiadis Tentoglou (GRE)	Thobias Montler (SWE)	Gabriel Bitan (ROM)
2025 Apeldoorn	Bozhidar Sarâboyukov (BUL)	Mattia Furlani (ITA)	Lester Lescay (ESP)

=== Triple jump ===
Games	Gold	Silver	Bronze
European Indoor Games
1966 Dortmund	Șerban Ciochină (ROU)	Michael Sauer (FRG)	Petr Nemšovský (TCH)
1967 Prague	Petr Nemšovský (TCH)	Henrik Kalocsai (HUN)	Aleksandr Zolotaryov (URS)
1968 Madrid	Nikolay Dudkin (URS)	Viktor Saneyev (URS)	Luis Felipe Areta (ESP)
1969 Belgrade	Nikolay Dudkin (URS)	Zoltán Cziffra (HUN)	Carol Corbu (ROU)
European Athletics Indoor Championships
1970 Vienna	Viktor Saneyev (URS)	Jörg Drehmel (GDR)	Șerban Ciochină (ROM)
1971 Sofia	Viktor Saneyev (URS)	Carol Corbu (ROM)	Gennadiy Savlevich (URS)
1972 Grenoble	Viktor Saneyev (URS)	Carol Corbu (ROM)	Valentyn Shevchenko (URS)
1973 Rotterdam	Carol Corbu (ROM)	Michał Joachimowski (POL)	Mikhail Bariban (URS)
1974 Gothenburg	Michał Joachimowski (POL)	Mikhail Bariban (URS)	Bernard Lamitié (FRA)
1975 Katowice	Viktor Saneyev (URS)	Michał Joachimowski (POL)	Gennady Bessonov (URS)
1976 Munich	Viktor Saneyev (URS)	Carol Corbu (ROM)	Bernard Lamitié (FRA)
1977 San Sebastián	Viktor Saneyev (URS)	Jaak Uudmäe (URS)	Bernard Lamitié (FRA)
1978 Milan	Anatoliy Piskulin (URS)	Keith Connor (GBR)	Aleksandr Yakovlev (URS)
1979 Vienna	Gennadiy Valyukevich (URS)	Anatoliy Piskulin (URS)	Jaak Uudmäe (URS)
1980 Sindelfingen	Béla Bakosi (HUN)	Jaak Uudmäe (URS)	Gennadiy Kovtunov (URS)
1981 Grenoble	Shamil Abbyasov (URS)	Klaus Kübler (FRG)	Aston Moore (GBR)
1982 Milan	Béla Bakosi (HUN)	Gennadiy Valyukevich (URS)	Nikolay Musiyenko (URS)
1983 Budapest	Nikolay Musiyenko (URS)	Gennadiy Valyukevich (URS)	Béla Bakosi (HUN)
1984 Gothenburg	Grigoriy Yemets (URS)	Vlastimil Mařinec (TCH)	Béla Bakosi (HUN)
1985 Piraeus	Khristo Markov (BUL)	Ján Čado (TCH)	Volker Mai (GDR)
1986 Madrid	Māris Bružiks (URS)	Vladimir Plekhanov (URS)	Béla Bakosi (HUN)
1987 Liévin	Serge Hélan (FRA)	Khristo Markov (BUL)	Nikolay Musiyenko (URS)
1988 Budapest	Oleg Sakirkin (URS)	Béla Bakosi (HUN)	Vasif Asadov (URS)
1989 The Hague	Nikolay Musiyenko (URS)	Volker Mai (GDR)	Milan Mikuláš (TCH)
1990 Glasgow	Igor Lapshin (URS)	Oleg Sakirkin (URS)	Tord Henriksson (SWE)
1992 Genoa	Leonid Voloshin (EUN)	Serge Hélan (FRA)	Vasiliy Sokov (EUN)
1994 Paris	Leonid Voloshin (RUS)	Denis Kapustin (RUS)	Vasiliy Sokov (RUS)
1996 Stockholm	Māris Bružiks (LAT)	Francis Agyepong (GBR)	Armen Martirosyan (ARM)
1998 Valencia	Jonathan Edwards (GBR)	Charles Friedek (GER)	Serge Hélan (FRA)
2000 Ghent	Charles Friedek (GER)	Rostislav Dimitrov (BUL)	Paolo Camossi (ITA)
2002 Vienna	Christian Olsson (SWE)	Marian Oprea (ROU)	Aleksandr Glavatskiy (BLR)
2005 Belgrade	Igor Spasovkhodskiy (RUS)	Mykola Savolainen (UKR)	Aleksandr Petrenko (RUS)
2007 Madrid	Phillips Idowu (GBR)	Nathan Douglas (GBR)	Aleksandr Sergeyev (RUS)
2009 Birmingham	Fabrizio Donato (ITA)	Viktor Yastrebov (UKR)	Igor Spasovkhodskiy (RUS)
2011 Turin	Teddy Tamgho (FRA)	Fabrizio Donato (ITA)	Marian Oprea (ROU)
2013 Paris	Daniele Greco (ITA)	Ruslan Samitov (RUS)	Aleksey Fyodorov (RUS)
2015 Prague	Nelson Évora (POR)	Pablo Torrijos (ESP)	Marian Oprea (ROU)
2017 Belgrade	Nelson Évora (POR)	Fabrizio Donato (ITA)	Max Heß (GER)
2019 Glasgow	Nazim Babayev (AZE)	Nelson Évora (POR)	Max Heß (GER)
2021 Toruń	Pedro Pichardo (POR)	Alexis Copello (AZE)	Max Heß (GER)
2023 Istanbul	Pedro Pichardo (POR)	Nikolaos Andrikopoulos (GRE)	Max Heß (GER)
2025 Apeldoorn	Andy Díaz (ITA)	Max Heß (GER)	Andrea Dallavalle (ITA)

=== Pole vault ===
Games	Gold	Silver	Bronze
European Indoor Games
1966 Dortmund	Hennadiy Bleznitsov (URS)	Rudolf Tomášek (TCH)	Rainer Liese (FRG)
1967 Prague	Igor Feld (URS)	Hennadiy Bleznitsov (URS)	Wolfgang Nordwig (GDR)
1968 Madrid	Wolfgang Nordwig (GDR)	Hennadiy Bleznitsov (URS)	Jörge Milack (GDR)
1969 Belgrade	Wolfgang Nordwig (GDR)	Hennadiy Bleznitsov (URS)	Jörge Milack (GDR)
European Athletics Indoor Championships
1970 Vienna	François Tracanelli (FRA)	Kjell Isaksson (SWE)	Wolfgang Nordwig (GDR)
1971 Sofia	Wolfgang Nordwig (GDR)	Kjell Isaksson (SWE)	Yuriy Isakov (URS)
1972 Grenoble	Wolfgang Nordwig (GDR)	Hans Lagerqvist (SWE)	Antti Kalliomaki (FIN)
1973 Rotterdam	Renato Dionisi (ITA)	Hans-Jürgen Ziegler (FRG)	Jean-Michel Bellot (FRA)
1974 Gothenburg	Tadeusz Ślusarski (POL)	Antti Kalliomaki (FIN)	Jânis Lauris (URS)
1975 Katowice	Antti Kalliomaki (FIN)	Wojciech Buciarski (POL)	Władysław Kozakiewicz (POL)
1976 Munich	Yuriy Prokhorenko (URS)	Antti Kalliomäki (FIN)	Renato Dionisi (ITA)
1977 San Sebastián	Władysław Kozakiewicz (POL)	Antti Kalliomäki (FIN)	Mariusz Klimczyk (POL)
1978 Milan	Tadeusz Ślusarski (POL)	Vladimir Trofimenko (URS)	Vladimir Sergiyenko (URS)
1979 Vienna	Władysław Kozakiewicz (POL)	Konstantin Volkov (URS)	Vladimir Trofimenko (URS)
1980 Sindelfingen	Konstantin Volkov (URS)	Vladimir Polyakov (URS)	Patrick Abada (FRA)
1981 Grenoble	Thierry Vigneron (FRA)	Aleksandr Krupskiy (URS)	Jean-Michel Bellot (FRA)
1982 Milan	Viktor Spassov (URS)	Konstantin Volkov (URS)	Władysław Kozakiewicz (POL)
1983 Budapest	Vladimir Polyakov (URS)	Aleksandrs Obižajevs (URS)	Patrick Abada (FRA)
1984 Gothenburg	Thierry Vigneron (FRA)	Pierre Quinon (FRA)	Aleksandr Krupskiy (URS)
1985 Piraeus	Sergei Bubka (URS)	Aleksandr Krupskiy (URS)	Atanas Tarev (BUL)
1986 Madrid	Atanas Tarev (BUL)	Marian Kolasa (POL)	Philippe Collet (FRA)
1987 Liévin	Thierry Vigneron (FRA)	Ferenc Salbert (FRA)	Marian Kolasa (POL)
1988 Budapest	Radion Gataullin (URS)	Nikolay Nikolov (BUL)	Atanas Tarev (BUL)
1989 The Hague	Grigoriy Yegorov (URS)	Igor Potapovich (URS)	Mirosław Chmara (POL)
1990 Glasgow	Radion Gataullin (URS)	Grigoriy Yegorov (URS)	Hermann Fehringer (AUT); Thierry Vigneron (FRA)
1992 Genoa	Pyotr Bochkaryov (EUN)	István Bagyula (HUN)	Konstantin Semyonov (EUN)
1994 Paris	Pyotr Bochkaryov (RUS)	Jean Galfione (FRA)	Igor Trandenkov (RUS)
1996 Stockholm	Dmitriy Markov (BLR)	Viktor Chistiakov (RUS)	Pyotr Bochkaryov (RUS)
1998 Valencia	Tim Lobinger (GER)	Michael Stolle (GER)	Danny Ecker (GER)
2000 Ghent	Aleksander Averbukh (ISR)	Martin Eriksson (SWE)	Rens Blom (NED)
2002 Vienna	Tim Lobinger (GER)	Patrik Kristiansson (SWE)	Lars Börgeling (GER)
2005 Belgrade	Igor Pavlov (RUS)	Denys Yurchenko (UKR)	Tim Lobinger (GER)
2007 Madrid	Danny Ecker (GER)	Denys Yurchenko (UKR)	Björn Otto (GER)
2009 Birmingham	Renaud Lavillenie (FRA)	Pavel Gerasimov (RUS)	Alexander Straub (GER)
2011 Turin	Renaud Lavillenie (FRA)	Jérôme Clavier (FRA)	Malte Mohr (GER)
2013 Paris	Renaud Lavillenie (FRA)	Björn Otto (GER)	Malte Mohr (GER)
2015 Prague	Renaud Lavillenie (FRA)	Aleksandr Gripich (RUS)	Piotr Lisek (POL)
2017 Belgrade	Piotr Lisek (POL)	Konstantinos Filippidis (GRE)	Paweł Wojciechowski (POL)
2019 Glasgow	Paweł Wojciechowski (POL)	Piotr Lisek (POL)	Melker Svärd Jacobsson (SWE)
2021 Toruń	Armand Duplantis (SWE)	Valentin Lavillenie (FRA)	Piotr Lisek (POL)
2023 Istanbul	Sondre Guttormsen (NOR)	Emmanouil Karalis (GRE); Piotr Lisek (POL)	—
2025 Apeldoorn	Emmanouil Karalis (GRE); Menno Vloon (NED)	—	Sondre Guttormsen (NOR)

=== Shot put ===
Games	Gold	Silver	Bronze
European Indoor Games
1966 Dortmund	Vilmos Varjú (HUN)	Dieter Hoffmann (GDR)	Jiří Skobla (TCH)
1967 Prague	Nikolay Karasyov (URS)	Eduard Gushchin (URS)	Władysław Komar (POL)
1968 Madrid	Heinfried Birlenbach (FRG)	Władysław Komar (POL)	Nikolay Karasyov (URS)
1969 Belgrade	Heinfried Birlenbach (FRG)	Hartmut Briesenick (GDR)	Heinz-Joachim Rothenburg (GDR)
European Athletics Indoor Championships
1970 Vienna	Hartmut Briesenick (GDR)	Heinz-Joachim Rothenburg (GDR)	Pierre Colnard (FRA)
1971 Sofia	Hartmut Briesenick (GDR)	Valeriy Voykin (URS)	Ricky Bruch (SWE)
1972 Grenoble	Hartmut Briesenick (GDR)	Władysław Komar (POL)	Jaroslav Brabec (TCH)
1973 Rotterdam	Jaroslav Brabec (TCH)	Gerd Lochmann (GDR)	Jaromír Vlk (TCH)
1974 Gothenburg	Geoff Capes (GBR)	Heinz-Joachim Rothenburg (GDR)	Jaroslav Brabec (TCH)
1975 Katowice	Valcho Stoev (BUL)	Geoff Capes (GBR)	Valeriy Voykin (URS)
1976 Munich	Geoff Capes (GBR)	Gerd Lochmann (GDR)	Aleksandr Baryshnikov (URS)
1977 San Sebastián	Hreinn Halldorsson (ISL)	Geoff Capes (GBR)	Władysław Komar (POL)
1978 Milan	Reijo Stahlberg (FIN)	Władysław Komar (POL)	Geoff Capes (GBR)
1979 Vienna	Reijo Stahlberg (FIN)	Geoff Capes (GBR)	Vladimir Kiselyov (URS)
1980 Sindelfingen	Zlatan Saračević (YUG)	Jaromír Vlk (TCH)	Ivan Ivančić (YUG)
1981 Grenoble	Reijo Stahlberg (FIN)	Luc Viudès (FRA)	Zlatan Saračević (YUG)
1982 Milan	Vladimir Milić (YUG)	Remigius Machura (TCH)	Jovan Lazarević (YUG)
1983 Budapest	Janis Bojars (URS)	Aleksandr Baryshnikov (URS)	Ivan Ivančić (YUG)
1984 Gothenburg	Janis Bojars (URS)	Werner Günthör (SUI)	Alessandro Andrei (ITA)
1985 Piraeus	Remigius Machura (TCH)	Ulf Timmermann (GDR)	Werner Günthör (SUI)
1986 Madrid	Werner Günthör (SUI)	Sergey Smirnov (URS)	Marco Montelatici (URS)
1987 Liévin	Ulf Timmermann (GDR)	Werner Günthör (SUI)	Sergey Smirnov (URS)
1988 Budapest	Remigius Machura (TCH)	Karsten Stolz (FRG)	Georgi Todorov (BUL)
1989 The Hague	Ulf Timmermann (GDR)	Karsten Stolz (FRG)	Georg Andersen (NOR)
1990 Glasgow	Klaus Bodenmüller (AUT)	Ulf Timmermann (GDR)	Oliver-Sven Buder (GDR)
1992 Genoa	Oleksandr Bagach (EUN)	Aleksandr Klimenko (EUN)	Klaus Bodenmüller (AUT)
1994 Paris	Oleksandr Bagach (UKR)	Dragan Peric (IEP)	Pétur Guðmundsson (ISL)
1996 Stockholm	Paolo Dal Soglio (ITA)	Dirk Urban (GER)	Sven Oliver Buder (GER)
1998 Valencia	Sven Oliver Buder (GER)	Mika Halvari (FIN)	Arsi Harju (FIN)
2000 Ghent	Timo Aaltonen (FIN)	Manuel Martínez (ESP)	Miroslav Menc (CZE)
2002 Vienna	Manuel Martinez (ESP)	Joachim Olsen (DEN)	Pavel Chumachenko (RUS)
2005 Belgrade	Joachim Olsen (DEN)	Rutger Smith (NED)	Manuel Martinez (ESP)
2007 Madrid	Mikuláš Konopka (SVK)	Pavel Lyzhyn (BLR)	Joachim Olsen (DEN)
2009 Birmingham	Tomasz Majewski (POL)	Yves Niaré (FRA)	Ralf Bartels (GER)
2011 Turin	Ralf Bartels (GER)	David Storl (GER)	Maksim Sidorov (RUS)
2013 Paris	Asmir Kolašinac (SRB)	Hamza Alić (BIH)	Ladislav Prášil (CZE)
2015 Prague	David Storl (GER)	Asmir Kolašinac (SRB)	Ladislav Prášil (CZE)
2017 Belgrade	Konrad Bukowiecki (POL)	Tomas Stanek (CZE)	David Storl (GER)
2019 Glasgow	Michał Haratyk (POL)	David Storl (GER)	Tomas Stanek (CZE)
2021 Toruń	Tomas Stanek (CZE)	Michał Haratyk (POL)	Filip Mihaljevic (CRO)
2023 Istanbul	Zane Weir (ITA)	Tomáš Staněk (CZE)	Roman Kokoshko (UKR)
2025 Apeldoorn	Andrei Toader (ROM)	Wictor Petersson (SWE)	Tomáš Staněk (CZE)

== Combined ==
Games	Gold	Silver	Bronze
1992 Genoa	Christian Plaziat (FRA)	Robert Změlík (TCH)	Antonio Peñalver (ESP)
1994 Paris	Christian Plaziat (FRA)	Henrik Dagård (SWE)	Alain Blondel (FRA)
1996 Stockholm	Erki Nool (EST)	Tomáš Dvořák (CZE)	Jón Arnar Magnússon (ISL)
1998 Valencia	Sebastian Chmara (POL)	Dezsõ Szabó (HUN)	Lev Lobodin (RUS)
2000 Ghent	Tomáš Dvořák (CZE)	Roman Šebrle (CZE)	Erki Nool (EST)
2002 Vienna	Roman Šebrle (CZE)	Tomáš Dvořák (CZE)	Erki Nool (EST)
2005 Belgrade	Roman Šebrle (CZE)	Aleksandr Pogorelov (RUS)	Roland Schwarzl (AUT)
2007 Madrid	Roman Šebrle (CZE)	Aleksandr Pogorelov (RUS)	Andrei Krauchanka (BLR)
2009 Birmingham	Mikk Pahapill (EST)	Oleksiy Kasyanov (UKR)	Roman Šebrle (CZE)
2011 Turin	Andrei Krauchanka (BLR)	Nadir El Fassi (FRA)	Roman Šebrle (CZE)
2013 Paris	Eelco Sintnicolaas (NED)	Kevin Mayer (FRA)	Mihail Dudaš (SRB)
2015 Prague	Ilya Shkurenyov (RUS)	Arthur Abele (GER)	Eelco Sintnicolaas (NED)
2017 Belgrade	Kevin Mayer (FRA)	Jorge Urena (ESP)	Adam Helcelet (CZE)
2019 Glasgow	Jorge Urena (ESP)	Tim Duckworth (GBR)	Ilya Shkurenyov (ANA)
2021 Toruń	Kevin Mayer (FRA)	Jorge Urena (ESP)	Paweł Wiesiołek (POL)
2023 Istanbul	Kevin Mayer (FRA)	Sander Skotheim (NOR)	Risto Lillemets (EST)
2023 Istanbul	Sander Skotheim (NOR)	Simon Ehammer (SUI)	Till Steinforth (GER)

== Defunct events ==
=== 200 m ===
Games	Gold	Silver	Bronze
1982 Milan	Erwin Skamrahl (FRG)	István Nagy (HUN)	Michele Di Pace (ITA)
1983 Budapest	Aleksandr Yevgenyev (URS)	Jacques Borlée (BEL)	István Nagy (HUN)
1984 Gothenburg	Aleksandr Yevgenyev (URS)	Ade Mafe (GBR)	Giovanni Bongiorni (ITA)
1985 Piraeus	Stefano Tilli (ITA)	Olaf Prenzler (GDR)	Aleksandr Yevgenyev (URS)
1986 Madrid	Linford Christie (GBR)	Aleksandr Yevgenyev (URS)	Nikolay Razgonov (URS)
1987 Liévin	Bruno Marie-Rose (FRA)	Vladimir Krylov (URS)	John Regis (GBR)
1988 Budapest	Nikolay Razgonov (URS)	Nikolay Antonov (BUL)	Linford Christie (GBR)
1989 The Hague	Ade Mafe (GBR)	John Regis (GBR)	Bruno Marie-Rose (FRA)
1990 Glasgow	Sandro Floris (ITA)	Nikolay Antonov (BUL)	Bruno Marie-Rose (FRA)
1992 Genoa	Nikolay Antonov (BUL)	Daniel Sangouma (FRA)	Aleksandr Goremykin (EUN)
1994 Paris	Daniel Sangouma (FRA)	Vladyslav Dolohodin (UKR)	Georgios Panayotopoulos (GRE)
1996 Stockholm	Erik Wijmeersch (BEL)	Alexis Alexopoulos (GRE)	Torbjörn Eriksson (SWE)
1998 Valencia	Serhiy Osovych (UKR)	Anninos Marcoullides (CYP)	Allyn Condon (GBR)
2000 Ghent	Christian Malcolm (GBR)	Patrick Stevens (BEL)	Julian Golding (GBR)
2002 Vienna	Marcin Urbaś (POL)	Christian Malcolm (GBR)	Robert Maćkowiak (POL)
2005 Belgrade	Tobias Unger (GER)	Chris Lambert (GBR)	Marcin Urbaś (POL)

=== 4 × 2 laps relay ===
Games	Gold	Silver	Bronze
European Indoor Games
1966 Dortmund	West Germany; Jörg Jüttner; Rainer Kunter; Hans Reinermann; Jens Ulbrich	Czechoslovakia; Miroslav Veruk; Juraj Demec; Ladislav Kriz; Josef Trousil	—
1967 Prague	Soviet Union; Vasyl Anisimov; Nikolay Ivanov; Boris Savchuk; Aleksandr Bratchikov	Poland; Edward Romanowski; Edmund Borowski; Jan Balachowski; Tadeusz Jaworski	Czechoslovakia; Jaromír Haisl; Josef Hegyes; Frantisek Ortman; Josef Trousil
1968 Madrid	Poland; Jan Werner; Waldemar Korycki; Jan Balachowski; Andrzej Badeński	West Germany; Horst Daverkausen; Peter Bernreuther; Ingo Roper; Martin Jellinghaus	Soviet Union; Vasyl Anisimov; Sergey Abalichin; Boris Savchuk; Aleksandr Bratchikov
1969 Belgrade	Poland; Jan Werner; Jan Radomski; Jan Balachowski; Andrzej Badeński	Soviet Union; Leonid Mikishev; Yuriy Zorin; Valeriy Borzov; Aleksandr Bratchikov	West Germany; Dieter Hübner; Herbert Moser; Peter Bernreuther; Manfred Kinder
European Athletics Indoor Championships
1970 Vienna	Soviet Union; Yevgeniy Borisenko; Yuriy Zorin; Boris Savchuk; Aleksandr Bratchikov	Poland; Jan Werner; Stanisław Grędziński; Jan Balachowski; Andrzej Badeński	West Germany; Dieter Hübner; Karl-Hermann Tofaute; Ulrich Strohhacker; Helmar Müller
1971 Sofia	Poland; Waldemar Korycki; Jan Werner; Andrzej Badeński; Jan Balachowski	Soviet Union; Aleksandr Bratchikov; Semyon Kocher; Boris Savchuk; Yevgeniy Borisenko	Bulgaria; Krestyu Christov; Alexander Yanev; Alexander Popov; Yordan Todorov
1972 Grenoble	Poland; Waldemar Korycki; Jan Werner; Andrzej Badeński; Jan Balachowski	West Germany; Peter Bernreuther; Rolf Krüsmann; Georg Nückles; Ulrich Reich	France; Patrick Salvador; André Paoli; Michel Dach; Gilles Bertould
1973 Rotterdam	France; Lucien Sainte Rose; Patrick Salvador; Francis Kerbiriou; Lionel Malingre	West Germany; Falko Geiger; Karl Honz; Ulrich Reich; Hermann Köhler	—
1974 Gothenburg	Sweden; Michael Fredriksson; Gert Möller; Ander Faager; Dimitre Grama	France; Pierre Bonvin; Patrick Salvador; Roger Vélazquez; Lionel Malingre	—
1975 Katowice	West Germany; Klaus Ehl; Franz-Peter Hofmeister; Karl Honz; Hermann Köhler	Poland; Wiesław Pucholski; Roman Siedlecki; Jerzy Włodarczyk; Wojciech Romanowski	Bulgaria; Krassimir Gutev; Narzis Popov; Yordan Yordanov; Yanko Bratanov

=== 4 × 800 m relay ===
Games	Gold	Silver	Bronze
1971 Sofia	Soviet Union; Valeriy Taratynov; Stanislav Meshcherskich; Alexey Taranov; Viktor Semyashkin	Poland; Krzysztof Linkowski; Zenon Szordykowski; Michał Skowronek; Kazimierz Wardak	West Germany; Paul-Heinz Wellmann; Godehard Brysch; Dieter Friedrich; Bernd Eppler
1972 Grenoble	West Germany; Thomas Wessinghage; Harald Norpoth; Paul-Heinz Wellmann; Franz-Josef Kemper	Soviet Union; Alexey Taranov; Valeriy Taratynov; Ivan Ivanov; Stanislav Meshcherskich	Poland; Zenon Szordykowski; Krzysztof Linkowski; Stanislaw Waskiewicz; Andrzej Kupczyk
1973 Rotterdam	West Germany; Reinhold Soyka; Josef Schmid; Thomas Wessinghage; Paul-Heinz Wellmann	Czechoslovakia; Ivan Kovac; Józef Samborsky; Jozef Plachý; Ján Sisovsky	Poland; Krzysztof Linkowski; Lesław Zając; Czesław Jursza; Henryk Sapko

=== 3 × 1000 m relay ===
Games	Gold	Silver	Bronze
European Indoor Games
1967 Prague	East Germany; Klaus Prenner; Wolf-Jochen Schulte-Hillen; Franz-Josef Kemper	Czechoslovakia; Pavel Hruska; Pavel Penkava; Petr Blaha	Soviet Union; Ramir Mitrofanov; Stanislav Simbirtsev; Michail Zhelobovskiy
1968 Madrid	Soviet Union; Oleg Rayko; Anatoliy Verlan; Michail Zhelobovskiy	Spain; Alberto Esteban; Enrique Bondia; Virgilio González	Czechoslovakia; Pavel Hruska; Ján Kasal; Miroslav Juza
1969 Belgrade	West Germany; Anton Adam; Walter Adams; Harald Norpoth	Czechoslovakia; Jan Sisovsky; Petr Blaha; Pavel Penkava	Yugoslavia; Radovan Piplović; Slavko Koprivica; Adam Ladik

=== Medley relay ===
Games	Gold	Silver	Bronze
European Indoor Games
1966 Dortmund	West Germany; Leonhard Händl; Werner Krönke; Rolf Krüsmann; Jürgen Schröter	Italy; Bruno Bianchi; Ito Giani; Sergio Ottolina; Sergio Bello	Belgium; Werner Oijzers; Willy Vandewyngaerden; Georges Wijnants; Albert van Hoorn
1967 Prague	East Germany; Gert Metz; Horst Haßlinger; Rolf Krüsmann; Manfred Hanika	Soviet Union; Boris Savchuk; Vasyl Anisimov; Aleksandr Bratchikov; Valeriy Frolov	Czechoslovakia; Jirí Kynos; Ladislav Kriz; Pavel Hruska; Pavel Penkava
1968 Madrid	Soviet Union; Alexander Lebedyev; Boris Savchuk; Igor Potapchenko; Sergey Kryuchek	Poland; Marian Dudziak; Waldemar Korycki; Andrzej Badeński; Edmund Borowski	Spain; José Luis Sánchez Paraíso; Ramon Magarinos; Alfonso Gabernet; José María Reina
1969 Belgrade	Poland; Edward Romanowski; Andrzej Badeński; Henryk Szordykowski; Jan Radomski	—	—
European Athletics Indoor Championships
1970 Vienna	Soviet Union; Alexander Konnikov; Sergey Kryuchek; Vladimir Kolesnikov; Ivan Ivanov	Poland; Edmund Borowski; Stanisław Waśkiewicz; Kazimierz Wardak; Eryk Żelazny	West Germany; Horst Hasslinger; Lothar Hirsch; Manfred Henne; Ingo Sensburg

=== 5000 m walk ===
Games	Gold	Silver	Bronze
1981 Grenoble	Hartwig Gauder (GDR)	Maurizio Damilano (ITA)	Gérard Lelievre (FRA)
1982 Milan	Maurizio Damilano (ITA)	Carlo Mattioli (ITA)	Martin Toporek (AUT)
1983 Budapest	Anatoliy Solomin (URS)	Yevgeniy Yevsyukov (URS)	Erling Andersen (NOR)
1984–1986	not included in the program		
1987 Liévin	Jozef Pribilinec (TCH)	Ronald Weigel (GDR)	Roman Mrázek (TCH)
1988 Budapest	Jozef Pribilinec (TCH)	Roman Mrázek (TCH)	Sándor Urbanik (HUN)
1989 The Hague	Mikhail Schennikov (URS)	Roman Mrázek (TCH)	Giovanni De Benedictis (ITA)
1990 Glasgow	Mikhail Schennikov (URS)	Giovanni De Benedictis (ITA)	Axel Noack (GDR)
1992 Genoa	Giovanni De Benedictis (ITA)	Frants Kostyukevich (EUN)	Stefan Johansson (SWE)
1994 Paris	Mikhail Shchennikov (RUS)	Ronald Weigel (GER)	Denis Langlois (FRA)

== See also ==
- List of European Athletics Championships medalists (men)
- List of European Athletics Championships medalists (women)
- List of European records in athletics
