= 1971 European Athletics Indoor Championships – Men's 4 × 800 metres relay =

The men's 4 × 800 metres relay event at the 1971 European Athletics Indoor Championships was held on 14 March in Sofia. Each athlete ran four laps of the 200 metres track.

== Results ==
Rank	Nation	Competitors	Time	Notes
1st place, gold medalist(s)	Soviet Union	Valeriy Taratynov; Stanislav Meshcherskich; Aleksey Taranov; Viktor Semyashkin	7:17.8	WB
2nd place, silver medalist(s)	Poland	Krzysztof Linkowski; Zenon Szordykowski; Michał Skowronek; Kazimierz Wardak	7:19.2	NR
3rd place, bronze medalist(s)	West Germany	Paul-Heinz Wellmann; Godehard Brysch; Dieter Friedrich; Bernd Eppler	7:25.0	
4	Bulgaria	Atanas Ananasov; Petar Kyatovski; Dimcho Deribeev; Petar Khikov	7:26.4	
