= 1970 European Athletics Indoor Championships – Men's medley relay =

The men's 400 + 600 + 800 + 1000 metres medley relay event at the 1970 European Athletics Indoor Championships was held on 15 March in Vienna. The first athlete ran two laps of the 200-metre track, the second three, the third four and the anchor five, thus 14 laps or 2800 metres in total.

== Results ==
=== Heats ===
First 2 teams in each heat (Q) qualified directly for the final.

Rank	Heat	Nation	Competitors	Time	Notes
1	1	Soviet Union	Aleksander Konnikov; Sergey Kryuchek; Vladimir Kolesnikov; Ivan Ivanov	6:20.4	Q
2	1	Poland	Edmund Borowski; Stanisław Waśkiewicz; Kazimierz Wardak; Eryk Żelazny	6:23.6	Q
1	2	West Germany	Horst Hasslinger; Lothar Hirsch; Manfred Henne; Ingo Sensburg	6:28.4	Q
2	2	France	Christian Nicolau; Gilles Bertould; Guy Taillard; Gérard Colin	6:28.4	Q
3	2	Austria	Ekkehard Kolodziejczak; Robert Kropiunik; Hermann Hosp; Walter Grabul	6:33.0	

=== Final ===
Rank	Nation	Competitors	Time	Notes
1st place, gold medalist(s)	Soviet Union	Aleksander Konnikov; Sergey Kryuchek; Vladimir Kolesnikov; Ivan Ivanov	6:18.0	
2nd place, silver medalist(s)	Poland	Edmund Borowski; Stanisław Waśkiewicz; Kazimierz Wardak; Eryk Żelazny	6:18.8	
3rd place, bronze medalist(s)	West Germany	Horst Hasslinger; Lothar Hirsch; Manfred Henne; Ingo Sensburg	6:19.6	
4	France	Christian Nicolau; Gilles Bertould; Guy Taillard; Gérard Colin	6:20.2	
