= 1973 European Athletics Indoor Championships – Men's 4 × 340 metres relay =

Sport event

The men's 4 × 340 metres relay event at the 1973 European Athletics Indoor Championships was held on 10 March in Rotterdam. Each athlete ran two laps of the 170 metres track.

== Results ==
Rank	Nation	Competitors	Time	Notes
1st place, gold medalist(s)	France	Lucien Sainte Rose; Patrick Salvador; Francis Kerbiriou; Lionel Malingre	2:46.00	
2nd place, silver medalist(s)	West Germany	Falko Geiger; Karl Honz; Ulrich Reich; Hermann Köhler	2:46.42	
