= 1966 European Indoor Games – Men's medley relay =

The men's 160 + 320 + 480 + 640 medley relay event at the 1966 European Indoor Games was held on 27 March in Dortmund. The first athlete ran one lap of the 160-metre track, the second two, the third three and the anchor four, which gave in total 10 laps or 1600 metres.

== Results ==
Rank	Nation	Competitors	Time	Notes
1st place, gold medalist(s)	West Germany	Leonhard Händl; Werner Krönke; Rolf Krüsmann; Jürgen Schröter	3:22.0	
2nd place, silver medalist(s)	Italy	Bruno Bianchi; Ito Giani; Sergio Ottolina; Sergio Bello	3:22.2	
3rd place, bronze medalist(s)	Belgium	Werner Oijzers; Willy Vandewyngaerden; Georges Wijnants; Albert van Hoorn	3:27.2	
