= Stefka Yordanova =

Personal information
- Born: 9 January 1947 Burgas, Bulgaria
- Died: 16 January 2011 (aged 64)

Sport
- Sport: Track and field
Medal record
Representing Bulgaria
European Indoor Championships
Gold medal – first place	1973 Rotterdam	800 metres
Bronze medal – third place	1971 Sofia	4 × 400 m relay

Stefka Yordanova (Bulgarian: Стефка Йорданова; 9 January 1947 – 16 January 2011) was a Bulgarian sprinter and middle-distance runner who specialized in the 400 and 800 metres.

Born in Burgas, she ran at the 1971 European Indoor Championships and won a bronze medal in the 4 × 400 metres relay. She then won the 800 metres gold medal at the 1973 European Indoor Championships. In so doing, she broke the indoor 800 metres world record, beating fellow Bulgarian Svetla Zlateva's record that had been set a mere two weeks before. She became Bulgarian 400 metres champion in 1970.

Yordanova died in Burgas in on January 16, 2011.
