= List of Polish records in athletics =

The following are the national records in athletics in Poland maintained by its national athletics federation: Polski Związek Lekkiej Atletyki (PZLA).

== Outdoor ==
Key to tables: Awaiting ratification Record not kept by PZLA Not ratified or later rescined by PZLA

=== Men ===
Event	Record	Athlete	Date	Meet	Place	Ref.	Video
100 y	9.53+ (+1.0 m/s)	Dariusz Kuć	31 May 2011	Golden Spike Ostrava	Ostrava, Czech Republic		
100 m	10.00 (+2.0 m/s)	Marian Woronin	9 June 1984		Warsaw, Poland		
200 m	19.98 (+1.7 m/s)	Marcin Urbaś	25 August 1999	World Championships	Seville, Spain		
300 m	31.93	Karol Zalewski	7 September 2014	Rieti Meeting	Rieti, Italy		
400 m	44.62	Tomasz Czubak	24 August 1999	World Championships	Seville, Spain		
500 m	1:00.56	Jakub Krzewina	21 May 2016		Wrocław, Poland		
600 m	1:14.55	Adam Kszczot	5 August 2009		Lahti, Finland		
800 m	1:43.22	Paweł Czapiewski	17 August 2001	Weltklasse Zürich	Zürich, Switzerland		
1000 m	2:14.30	Marcin Lewandowski	25 August 2016	Athletissima	Lausanne, Switzerland		
1500 m	3:30.42	Marcin Lewandowski	9 July 2021	Herculis	Fontvieille, Monaco		
Mile	3:49.11	Marcin Lewandowski	1 July 2021	Bislett Games	Oslo, Norway		
Mile (road)	3:57.34	Marcin Lewandowski	16 June 2019		Boston, United States		
2000 m	4:57.09	Marcin Lewandowski	19 August 2020	Irena Szewinska Memorial	Bydgoszcz, Poland		
3000 m	7:40.22	Kamil Herzyk	2 September 2025		Trier, Germany		
Two miles	8:17.8 h	Bronisław Malinowski	21 August 1974	ISTAF	Berlin, Germany		
5000 m	13:17.69	Bronisław Malinowski	5 July 1976		Stockholm, Sweden		
5 km (road)	13:39	Michał Bartoszak	7 March 1993		Los Angeles, United States		
10,000 m	27:53.61	Jerzy Kowol	29 August 1978	European Championships	Prague, Czechoslovakia		
10 km (road)	28:05	Leszek Bebło	1 May 1991		Essen, Germany		
10 km (road)	27:56	Henryk Szost	11 September 2010		Gdańsk, Poland		
10 km (road)	27:33	Jan Białk	7 September 1996		Muszyna, Poland		
15 km (road)	43:45	Jan Huruk	15 February 1992		Tampa, United States		
15 km (road)	43:45	Sławomir Majusiak	3 June 1990		La Courneuve, France		
20,000 m (track)	59:24.8+	Leszek Bebło	31 March 1990		La Flèche, France		
20 km (road)	58:35+	Krystian Zalewski	17 October 2020	World Half Marathon Championships	Gdynia, Poland		
One hour	20218 m	Leszek Bebło	31 March 1990		La Flèche, France		
Half marathon	1:01:32	Krystian Zalewski	17 October 2020	World Half Marathon Championships	Gdynia, Poland		
Half marathon	1:01:03 (Note: short course)	Grzegorz Gajdus	11 February 1996		Las Vegas, United States		
25,000 m (track)	1:17:54.0+	Kazimierz Podolak	19 October 1969		Warsaw, Poland		
25 km (road)	1:15:25	Artur Osman	6 May 2001	BIG 25	Berlin, Germany		
30,000 m (track)	1:35:44.4	Michał Wójcik	19 October 1969		Warsaw, Poland		
30 km (road)	1:34:38	Bogusław Psujek	10 August 1988		Brzeszcze, Poland		
30 km (road)	1:34:38	Jerzy Skarzyński	10 August 1988		Brzeszcze, Poland		
Marathon	2:07:39	Henryk Szost	4 March 2012	Lake Biwa Marathon	Ōtsu, Japan		
50 km (road)
50 km (road)	2:52:12	Paweł Kosek	12 May 2024	UltraPark Weekend 50 km	Pabianice, Poland		
50 km (road)	2:53:07	Janusz Sarnicki	13 November 1990		Rodenbach, Germany		
50 km (road)	2:41:33	Tomasz Chawawko	25 May 2003		Castelbolognese, Italy		
100 km (road)	6:23:34	Jarosław Janicki	26 June 1994		Lake Saroma, Japan		
100 km (road)	6:22:33	Jarosław Janicki	21 October 1995		Kalisz, Poland		
100 km (road)	6:17:56	Jan Szumiec	13 September 1986		Winschoten, Netherlands		
6 hours (track)	95.004 km	Dariusz Nożyński	23 April 2022	National Championships	Chorzów, Poland		
12 hours (road)	166.370 km	Andrzej Piotrowski	1 April 2023	2 SLO24 - 12h	Koper, Slovenia		
24 hours (road)	301.859 km	Andrzej Piotrowski	18 September 2022	IAU 24 Hour European Championships	Verona, Italy		
48 hours (road)	391.849 km	Bartosz Fudali	13–15 May 2022	ABM Jedraszek UltraPark Weekend	Pabianice, Poland		
72 hours (road)	466.910 km	Marek Gulbierz	2 July 2000		Deventer, Netherlands		
110 m hurdles	13.25 (+1.3 m/s)	Damian Czykier	11 June 2022		Suwałki, Poland		
110 m hurdles	13.25 (+1.1 m/s)	Jakub Szymanski	28 June 2024	Polish Championships	Bydgoszcz, Poland		
400 m hurdles	48.12	Marek Plawgo	28 August 2007	World Championships	Osaka, Japan		
2000 m steeplechase	5:20.00	Krzysztof Wesołowski	28 June 1984		Oslo, Norway		
3000 m steeplechase	8:09.11	Bronisław Malinowski	28 July 1976	Olympic Games	Montreal, Canada		
High jump	2.38 m	Artur Partyka	18 August 1996	Internationales Hochsprung-Meeting Eberstadt	Eberstadt, Germany		
Pole vault	6.02 m	Piotr Lisek	12 July 2019	Diamond League	Fontvieille, Monaco		
Long jump	8.28 m A (+0.8 m/s)	Grzegorz Marciniszyn	14 July 2001		Mals, Italy		
Triple jump	17.53 m (+1.6 m/s)	Zdzisław Hoffmann	4 June 1985		Madrid, Spain		
Shot put	22.32 m	Michał Haratyk	26 July 2019		Warsaw, Poland		
Shot put	22.32 m	Michał Haratyk	3 August 2019	Kamila Skolimowska Throwing Festival	Władysławowo, Poland		
Discus throw	71.84 m	Piotr Małachowski	8 June 2013	Fanny Blankers-Koen Games	Hengelo, Netherlands		
Hammer throw	83.93 m	Paweł Fajdek	9 August 2015	Janusz Kusociński Memorial	Szczecin, Poland		
Javelin throw	89.55 m	Marcin Krukowski	8 June 2021	Paavo Nurmi Games	Turku, Finland		
Weight throw	21.34 m	Maciej Pałyszko	9 May 2009		Sopot, Poland		
Decathlon	8566 pts	Sebastian Chmara	16–17 May 1998		Murcia, Spain		
Decathlon	100m (wind) / Long jump (wind) / Shot put / High jump / 400m / 110m H (wind) / Discus / Pole vault / Javelin / 1500m; 10.97 (+2.9 m/s) / 7.56 m (−1.2 m/s) / 16.03 m / 2.10 m / 48.27 / 14.32 (+1.8 m/s) / 44.39 m / 5.20 m / 57.25 m / 4:29.66						
Mile walk (track)	5:35.49	Maher Ben Hlima	4 June 2023	Janusz Kusociński Memorial	Chorzów, Poland		
3000 m walk (track)	10:56.98	Dawid Tomala	29 June 2018		Šamorín, Slovakia		
5000 m walk (track)	18:17.22	Robert Korzeniowski	3 July 1992		Reims, France		
5 km walk (road)	18:21	Robert Korzeniowski	15 September 1990		Bad Salzdetfurth, Germany		
10,000 m walk (track)	38:26.53	Robert Korzeniowski	31 May 2002		Riga, Latvia		
10 km walk (road)	37:57	Robert Korzeniowski	8 June 2002		Kraków, Poland		
One hour walk (track)	14794 m	Robert Korzeniowski	22 March 1992		Meaux, France		
20,000 m walk (track)	1:19:52.0	Robert Korzeniowski	4 September 2001		Brisbane, Australia		
20 km walk (road)	1:18:22	Robert Korzeniowski	9 July 2000		Hildesheim, Germany		
Half marathon walk (road)	1:26:14	Maher Ben Hlima	15 August 2026	European Championships	Birmingham, United Kingdom		
Two hours walk (track)	27020 m	Jan Kłos	29 September 1991		Warsaw, Poland		
30,000 m walk (track)	2:11:12.0	Grzegorz Sudoł	12 March 2011		Reims, France		
35 km walk (road)	2:27:51	Maher Ben Hlima	22 March 2025	Dudinská Päťdesiatka	Dudince, Slovakia		
50,000 m walk (track)	3:52:53.0	Jacek Bednarek	15 May 1992		Fana, Norway		
50 km walk (road)	3:36:03	Robert Korzeniowski	27 August 2003	World Championships	Paris, France		
4 × 100 m relay	38.15	Poland; Adrian Brzeziński; Przemysław Słowikowski; Patryk Wykrota; Dominik Kopeć	21 August 2022	European Championships	Munich, Germany		
4 × 200 m relay	1:21.22	Poland; Zbigniew Tulin; Piotr Balcerzak; Ryszard Pilarczyk; Marcin Urbaś	14 July 2001		Gdańsk, Poland		
4 × 400 m relay	2:58.00	Poland; Piotr Rysiukiewicz; Tomasz Czubak; Piotr Haczek; Robert Maćkowiak	22 July 1998	Goodwill Games	Uniondale, United States		
4 × 800 m relay	7:08.69	Poland; Karol Konieczny; Szymon Krawczyk; Marcin Lewandowski; Adam Kszczot	24 May 2014	IAAF World Relays	Nassau, Bahamas		
Distance medley relay	9:24.07	Poland; Mateusz Demczyszak (1200 m); Łukasz Krawczuk (400 m); Adam Kszczot (800 m); Marcin Lewandowski (1600 m)	3 May 2015	IAAF World Relays	Nassau, Bahamas		
4 × 1500 m relay	15:02.6	Poland; Zenon Szordykowski; Józef Ziubrak; Michał Skowronek; Henryk Wasilewski	5 May 1976		Athens, Greece		
Ekiden relay	2:06:26	Poland; Rafał Snochowski / 5 km Radosław Dudycz / 10 km Tomasz Szymkowiak / 5 km Paweł Ochal / 10 km Mariusz Giżyński / 5 km Rafał Wójcik / 7.195 km	23 November 2006	International Chiba Ekiden	Chiba, Japan		
Ekiden relay	2:05:44	Poland; Jakub Burghardt / 5 km Paweł Ochal / 10 km Marcin Fudalej / 5 km Rafał Wójcik / 10 km Tomasz Szymkowiak / 5 km Henryk Szost / 7.195 km	17 September 2005		Warsaw, Poland		

=== Women ===
Event	Record	Athlete	Date	Meet	Place	Ref.
100 m	10.93 (+1.8 m/s)	Ewa Kasprzyk	27 June 1986		Grudziądz, Poland	
150 m	17.39	Agata Forkasiewicz	5 May 2018		Wrocław, Poland	
200 m	22.13 (+1.2 m/s)	Ewa Kasprzyk	8 July 1986	Goodwill Games	Moscow, Soviet Union	
300 m	35.51	Natalia Bukowiecka	9 August 2025	Mityng Ambasadorów Białostockiego Sportu	Białystok, Poland	
400 m	48.90	Natalia Kaczmarek	20 July 2024	London Athletics Meet	London, United Kingdom	
500 m	1:08.65	Aleksandra Gaworska	6 May 2018		Kraków, Poland	
600 m	1:25.04	Joanna Jóźwik	9 August 2015	Janusz Kusociński Memorial	Szczecin, Poland	
800 m	1:56.95	Jolanta Januchta	11 September 1980		Budapest, Hungary	
1000 m	2:32.30	Sofia Ennaoui	14 August 2020	Herculis	Fontvieille, Monaco	
1500 m	3:57.31	Weronika Lizakowska	8 August 2024	Olympic Games	Paris, France	
1500 m	3:55.59	Klaudia Kazimierska	23 August 2026	Kamila Skolimowska Memorial	Chorzów, Poland	
1500 m	3:54.05	Klaudia Kazimierska	5 September 2026	Memorial Van Damme	Brussels, Belgium	
Mile	4:19.58	Angelika Cichocka	9 July 2017	London Grand Prix	London, United Kingdom	
Mile	4:17.90	Klaudia Kazimierska	4 July 2026	Prefontaine Classic	Eugene, United States	
Mile (road)	4:37.04 Wo	Weronika Lizakowska	1 October 2023	World Road Running Championships	Riga, Latvia	
Mile (road)	4:34.27 Wo	Weronika Lizakowska	19 September 2026	World Road Running Championships	Copenhagen, Denmark	
2000 m	5:38.44	Lidia Chojecka	4 September 2009	Memorial Van Damme	Brussels, Belgium	
3000 m	8:31.69	Lidia Chojecka	30 August 2002	Memorial Van Damme	Brussels, Belgium	
5000 m	15:04.88	Lidia Chojecka	6 September 2002	ISTAF	Berlin, Germany	
5 km (road)	15:28 Mx	Wanda Panfil	3 March 1991	Rogaine Race	Los Angeles, United States	
5 km (road)	15:34 Wo	Grażyna Syrek	19 September 2004	Praha Mattoni GP	Prague, Czech Republic	
10,000 m	31:43.51	Karolina Jarzyńska	27 June 2013	Golden Spike Ostrava	Ostrava, Czech Republic	
10 km (road)	32:00	Elżbieta Ginka	11 November 2025	Bieg Niepodległości	Warsaw, Poland	
10 km (road)	31:49 (Note: The results was not ratified because the race organizer did not meet the requirements specified in the regulations for ratifying records; the guidelines set out in the regulations for ratifying Polish records were not met; The competition was not entered into the Polish Athletics Association calendar, and the Polish Athletics Association have no information regarding, for example, the work of the judges or doping control)	Izabela Paszkiewicz	24 October 2021	Międzynarodowy Bieg Warciański im. Zdzisława Krzyszkowiaka	Koło, Poland	
10 km (road)	31:47	Elżbieta Glinka	11 January 2026	10K Valencia Ibercaja by Kiprun	Valencia, Spain	
15 km (road)	49:24	Lidia Camberg	13 October 1991		Nieuwegein, Netherlands	
15 km (road)	49:14+	Karolina Nadolska	26 March 2017	Poznań Half Marathon	Poznań, Poland	
15 km (road)	49:02+	Elżbieta Glinka	27 September 2026	Gdansk Half Marathon	Gdansk, Poland	
One hour	15605 m	Irena Sakowicz	8 October 2006		Białystok, Poland	
20 km (road)	1:06:30+	Katarzyna Kowalska	2 April 2016	Prague Half Marathon	Prague, Czech Republic	
20 km (road)	1:06:08+	Karolina Nadolska	26 March 2017	Poznań Half Marathon	Poznań, Poland	
20 km (road)	1:05:20+	Elżbieta Glinka	27 September 2026	Gdansk Half Marathon	Gdansk, Poland	
Half marathon	1:09:18	Karolina Nadolska	17 October 2021	Poznań Half Marathon	Poznań, Poland	
Half marathon	1:08:48	Elżbieta Glinka	27 September 2026	Gdansk Half Marathon	Gdansk, Poland	
25 km (road)	1:25:00+	Karolina Jarzyńska	26 January 2014	Osaka International Ladies Marathon	Osaka, Japan	
30 km (road)	1:42:22+	Karolina Jarzyńska	26 January 2014	Osaka International Ladies Marathon	Osaka, Japan	
Marathon	2:24:59 Mx	Aleksandra Lisowska	21 September 2025	Berlin Marathon	Berlin, Germany	
Marathon	2:28:36 Wo	Aleksandra Lisowska	15 August 2022	European Championships	Munich, Germany	
Marathon	2:24:18 dh	Wanda Panfil	15 April 1991	Boston Marathon	Boston, United States	
100 km (road)	7:04:36	Dominika Stelmach	30 August 2020	ABM Jędraszek Ultrapark Weekend	Pabianice, Poland	
12-hour run (road)	152.633 km	Dominika Stelmach	5 January 2023	Spartanion Race	Tel Aviv, Israel	
24-hour run (road)	260.678 km	Małgorzata Pazda-Pozorska	29–30 August 2020	ABM Jędraszek Ultrapark Weekend	Pabianice, Poland	
48-hour run (road)	436.371 km	Patrycja Bereznowska	30 May–1 June 2025	UltraPark Weekend 48 Hour	Pabianice, Poland	
100 m hurdles	12.36 (+1.9 m/s)	Grażyna Rabsztyn	13 June 1980		Warsaw, Poland	
200 m hurdles (bend)	25.8 h (−0.9 m/s)	Teresa Sukniewicz	9 August 1970		Warsaw, Poland	
300 m hurdles	39.2 h	Joanna Linkiewicz	8 May 2016	27th International Meeting	Pliezhausen, Germany	
400 m hurdles	53.86	Anna Jesień	28 August 2007	World Championships	Osaka, Japan	
2000 m steeplechase	6:03.38	Wioletta Janowska	15 July 2006		Gdańsk, Poland	
3000 m steeplechase	9:16.51	Alicja Konieczek	4 August 2024	Olympic Games	Paris, France	
High jump	1.99 m (Note: indoor mark ratified as absolute record)	Kamila Lićwinko	9 June 2013	Opolski Festiwal Skoków	Opole, Poland	
High jump	1.99 m	Kamila Lićwinko	29 August 2015	World Championships	Beijing, China	
High jump	1.99 m	Kamila Lićwinko	18 June 2016	62nd Janusz Kusociński Memorial	Szczecin, Poland	
High jump	1.99 m	Justyna Kasprzycka	31 May 2014	Prefontaine Classic	Eugene, United States	
High jump	1.99 m	Justyna Kasprzycka	17 August 2014	European Championships	Zürich, Switzerland	
Pole vault	4.83 m (Note: indoor mark ratified as absolute record)	Anna Rogowska	26 August 2005	Memorial Van Damme	Brussels, Belgium	
Long jump	6.97 m (+2.0 m/s)	Agata Karczmarek	6 August 1988		Lublin, Poland	
Triple jump	14.44 m (+1.8 m/s)	Małgorzata Trybańska	29 July 2010	European Championships	Barcelona, Spain	
Shot put	19.58 m	Ludwika Chewińska	26 June 1976		Bydgoszcz, Poland	
Discus throw	66.18 m	Renata Katewicz	7 August 1988		Łódź, Poland	
Hammer throw	82.98 m	Anita Włodarczyk	28 August 2016	Skolimowska Memorial	Warsaw, Poland	
Javelin throw	71.40 m	Maria Andrejczyk	9 May 2021	European Throwing Cup	Split, Croatia	
Heptathlon	6672 pts	Adriana Sułek	17–18 July 2022	World Championships	Eugene, United States	
Heptathlon	100m H (wind) / High jump / Shot put / 200m (wind) / Long jump (wind) / Javelin / 800m; 13.28 (+0.7 m/s) / 1.89 m / 14.13 m / 23.77 (+1.4 m/s) / 6.43 m (+0.8 m/s) / 41.63 m / 2:07.18					
Mile walk (track)	6:27.76	Olga Chojecka	4 June 2023	Janusz Kusociński Memorial	Chorzów, Poland	
3000 m walk (track)	12:16.00	Katarzyna Radtke	1 May 1993		Sopot, Poland	
3 km walk (road)	12:31	Katarzyna Radtke	9 May 1993		Søfteland, Norway	
5000 m walk (track)	20:51.96	Katarzyna Radtke	20 June 1993		Sopot, Poland	
5 km walk (road)	21:03	Katarzyna Radtke	4 May 1996		Sopot, Poland	
10,000 m walk (track)	42:47.4	Katarzyna Radtke	8 May 1993		Fana, Norway	
10 km walk (road)	42:17	Katarzyna Radtke	11 May 1996	Oder-Neisse Racewalking Grand Prix	Eisenhüttenstadt, Germany	
Hour walk (track)	12032 m	Kazimiera Mosio	10 October 1993		Mielec, Poland	
15 km walk (road)	1:06:31+	Agnieszka Dygacz	3 May 2014	IAAF World Race Walking Cup	Taicang, China	
20 km walk (road)	1:27:31	Katarzyna Zdziebło	15 July 2022	World Championships	Eugene, United States	
Two hours walk (road)	20934 m+	Lucyna Rokitowska	9 October 1983		Zabrze, Poland	
30 km walk (road)	2:57:28.8	Lucyna Rokitowska	9 October 1983		Zabrze, Poland	
35 km walk (road)	2:40:03	Katarzyna Zdziebło	22 July 2022	World Championships	Eugene, United States	
Marathon walk (road)	3:19:50	Katarzyna Zdziebło	15 August 2026	European Championships	Birmingham, United Kingdom	
50 km walk (road)	4:31:19	Agnieszka Ellward	19 May 2019	European Cup	Alytus, Lithuania	
4 × 100 m relay	42.61	Poland; Pia Skrzyszowska; Anna Kiełbasińska; Marika Popowicz-Drapała; Ewa Swoboda	21 August 2022	European Championships	Munich, Germany	
4 × 200 m relay	1:34.98	Poland; Paulina Guzowska; Kamila Ciba; Klaudia Adamek; Marlena Gola	2 May 2021	World Relays	Chorzów, Poland	
4 × 400 m relay	3:20.53	Poland; Natalia Kaczmarek; Iga Baumgart-Witan; Małgorzata Hołub-Kowalik; Justyna Święty-Ersetic	7 August 2021	Olympic Games	Tokyo, Japan	
4 × 800 m relay	8:11.36	Syntia Ellward; Katarzyna Broniatowska; Angelika Cichocka; Sofia Ennaoui	3 May 2014	IAAF World Relays	Nassau, Bahamas	
Distance medley relay	10:45.32	Poland; Katarzyna Broniatowska (1200 m); Monika Szczęsna (400 m); Angelika Cichocka (800 m); Sofia Ennaoui (1600 m)	2 May 2015	IAAF World Relays	Nassau, Bahamas	

=== Mixed ===
Event	Record	Athlete	Date	Meet	Place	Ref.
4 × 400 m relay	3:09.43	Poland; Maksymilian Szwed; Justyna Święty-Ersetic; Daniel Sołtysiak; Natalia Bukowiecka	29 June 2025	European Team Championships	Madrid, Spain	

== Indoor ==
=== Men ===
Event	Record	Athlete	Date	Meet	Place	Ref.	Video
50 m	5.65	Marian Woronin	21 February 1981	European Championships	Grenoble, France		
60 m	6.51	Marian Woronin	21 February 1987		Liévin, France		
100 m	10.32	Dariusz Kuć	15 February 2014		Florø, Norway		
200 m	20.55	Marcin Urbaś	1 March 2002	European Championships	Vienna, Austria		
300 m	32.60	Karol Zalewski	25 January 2018	Czech Indoor Gala	Ostrava, Czech Republic		
400 m	45.31	Maksymilian Szwed	8 March 2025	European Championships	Apeldoorn, Netherlands		
600 m	1:15.26	Adam Kszczot	5 February 2012	Russian Winter Meeting	Moscow, Russia		
800 m	1:44.57	Adam Kszczot	14 February 2012	Meeting Pas de Calais	Liévin, France		
800 m	1:44.07	Maciej Wyderka	3 February 2026	Czech Indoor Gala	Ostrava, Czech Republic		
1000 m	2:17.67	Marcin Lewandowski	28 February 2014	Moselle Athleror Meet	Metz, France		
1500 m	3:35.71	Marcin Lewandowski	17 February 2021	Copernicus Cup	Toruń, Poland		
Mile	3:56.41	Marcin Lewandowski	13 February 2019	AIT International Grand Prix	Athlone, Ireland		
2000 m	5:05.63	Łukasz Parszczyński	15 February 2014	Open Meet	Spała, Poland		
3000 m	7:49.26	Łukasz Parszczyński	23 February 2014	National Championships	Sopot, Poland		
5000 m	14:09.89	Artur Kern	10 March 2007		Boston, United States		
2000 m steeplechase	5:25.18	Hubert Pokrop	13 February 2011	Indoor Flanders Meeting	Ghent, Belgium		
50 m hurdles	6.48	Tomasz Ścigaczewski	5 February 1999		Budapest, Hungary		
50 m hurdles	6.47+	Jakub Szymański	13 February 2025	Meeting Hauts-de-France Pas-de-Calais	Liévin, France		
60 m hurdles	7.39	Jakub Szymański	8 February 2025	Orlen Cup	Łódź, Poland		
60 m hurdles	7.37	Jakub Szymański	6 March 2026	ISTAF Indoor	Berlin, Germany		
High jump	2.37 m	Artur Partyka	3 February 1991		Sulingen, Germany		
High jump	2.37 m	Artur Partyka	10 March 1991	World Championships	Seville, Spain		
High jump	2.37 m	Artur Partyka	11 February 1995		Balingen, Germany		
High jump	2.37 m	Artur Partyka	18 February 2000		Spała, Poland		
Pole vault	6.00 m	Piotr Lisek	4 February 2017	18th International Pole Vault Meeting	Potsdam, Germany		
Long jump	8.18 m	Marcin Starzak	8 March 2009	European Championships	Turin, Italy		
Long jump	8.18 m	Adrian Strzałkowski	7 March 2014	World Championships	Sopot, Poland		
Triple jump	17.03 m	Michał Joachimowski	9 March 1974	European Championships	Gothenburg, Sweden		
Shot put	22.00 m	Konrad Bukowiecki	15 February 2018	Copernicus Cup	Toruń, Poland		
Weight throw	23.22 m	Paweł Fajdek	31 January 2014	Pedro's Cup	Bydgoszcz, Poland		
Discus throw	63.73 m	Piotr Małachowski	1 March 2014	ISTAF Indoor	Berlin, Germany		
Heptathlon	6415 pts	Sebastian Chmara	28 February–1 March 1998	European Championships	Valencia, Spain		
Heptathlon	60m / Long jump / Shot put / High jump / 60m H / Pole vault / 1000m; 7.12 / 7.65 m / 15.70 m / 2.17 m / 7.98 / 5.20 m / 2:42.31						
3000 m walk	10:58.89	Dawid Tomala	25 February 2018	Glasgow Grand Prix	Glasgow, United Kingdom		
5000 m walk	18:32.09	Robert Korzeniowski	21 February 1993		Spała, Poland		
4 × 200 m relay	1:26.08	Poland; Czesław Prądzyński; Krzysztof Zwoliński; Andrzej Stępień; Piotr Piekarski	11 February 1984		Turin, Italy		
4 × 400 m relay	3:01.77	Poland; Karol Zalewski; Rafał Omelko; Łukasz Krawczuk; Jakub Krzewina	4 March 2018	World Championships	Birmingham, United Kingdom		
4 × 800 m relay	7:19.2	Poland; Krzysztof Linkowski; Zenon Szordykowski; Michał Skowronek; Kazimierz Wardak	14 March 1971	European Championships	Sofia, Bulgaria		

=== Women ===
Event	Record	Athlete	Date	Meet	Place	Ref.	Video
50 m	6.12+	Ewa Swoboda	4 February 2025	Czech Indoor Gala	Ostrava, Czech Republic		
60 m	6.98	Ewa Swoboda	2 March 2024	World Championships	Glasgow, United Kingdom		
100 m	11.61	Weronika Wedler	15 February 2014		Florø, Norway		
200 m	22.69	Ewa Kasprzyk	6 March 1988	European Championships	Budapest, Hungary		
300 m	36.20	Natalia Kaczmarek	5 February 2022		Spała, Poland		
400 m	50.83	Natalia Kaczmarek	19 February 2023	Polish Championships	Toruń, Poland		
400 m	50.83	Natalia Kaczmarek	21 March 2026	World Championships	Toruń, Poland		
500 m	1:09.56	Aleksandra Formella	28 January 2024	Ogólnopolskie halowe zawody lekkoatletyczne	Toruń, Poland		
600 m	1:26.6 h	Jolanta Januchta	21 February 1980		Warsaw, Poland		
800 m	1:59.29	Joanna Jóźwik	10 February 2017	Copernicus Cup	Toruń, Poland		
1000 m	2:35.69	Sofia Ennaoui	25 February 2023	World Indoor Tour Final	Birmingham, United Kingdom		
1500 m	4:03.58	Lidia Chojecka	21 February 2003	Aviva Indoor Grand Prix	Birmingham, United Kingdom		
Mile	4:24.44	Lidia Chojecka	6 February 2000	Sparkassen Cup	Stuttgart, Germany		
Mile	4:21.36	Klaudia Kazimierska	1 February 2026	Millrose Games	New York City, United States		
2000 m	5:43.62	Wioletta Janowska	12 February 2006	Erdgas Athletics	Leipzig, Germany		
3000 m	8:38.21	Lidia Chojecka	3 February 2007	Sparkassen Cup	Stuttgart, Germany		
Two miles	9:31.68	Lidia Chojecka	20 February 2010	Aviva Indoor Grand Prix	Birmingham, United Kingdom		
5000 m	15:34.74	Alicja Konieczek	2 December 2023	BU Sharon Colyear-Danville Season Opener	Boston, United States		
50 m hurdles	6.74	Zofia Bielczyk	21 February 1981	European Championships	Grenoble, France		
60 m hurdles	7.74	Pia Skrzyszowska	23 March 2025	World Championships	Nanjing, China		
60 m hurdles	7.73	Pia Skrzyszowska	22 March 2026	World Championships	Toruń, Poland		
400 m hurdles	57.96	Joanna Linkiewicz	6 February 2017	Meeting Elite en salle de l'Eure	Val-de-Reuil, France		
High jump	2.02 m	Kamila Lićwinko	21 February 2015	Polish Championships	Toruń, Poland		
Pole vault	4.85 m	Anna Rogowska	6 March 2011	European Championships	Paris, France		
Long jump	6.74 m	Anna Włodarczyk	2 March 1980	European Championships	Sindelfingen, Germany		
Long jump	6.77 m	Anna Matuszewicz	31 January 2026	Gorzów Jump Festival	Gorzów Wielkopolski, Poland		
Triple jump	14.16 m	Małgorzata Trybańska	27 January 2011	Internationales Erdgas Hallenmeeting	Chemnitz, Germany		
Shot put	19.26 m	Krystyna Zabawska	21 February 1999		Spała, Poland		
Weight throw	20.09 m	Anita Włodarczyk	31 January 2014	Pedro's Cup	Bydgoszcz, Poland		
Pentathlon	5014 pts	Adrianna Sułek	3 March 2023	European Championships	Istanbul, Turkey		
Pentathlon	60m H / High jump / Shot put / Long jump / 800m; 8.21 / 1.89 m / 13.89 m / 6.62 m / 2:07.17						
3000 m walk	12:17.17	Katarzyna Radtke	27 February 1994		Spała, Poland		
5000 m walk	23:55.14	Magdalena Żelazna	15 January 2022		Spała, Poland		
4 × 200 m relay	1:34.18	Poland; Małgorzata Dunecka; Elżbieta Tomczak; Elżbieta Kapusta; Elżbieta Woźniak	11 February 1984		Turin, Italy		
4 × 400 m relay	3:26.09	Poland; Justyna Święty-Ersetic; Patrycja Wyciszkiewicz; Aleksandra Gaworska; Małgorzata Hołub-Kowalik	4 March 2018	World Championships	Birmingham, United Kingdom		

=== Mixed ===
Event	Record	Athlete	Date	Meet	Place	Ref.
4 × 400 m relay	3:24.15	OŚ AZS Poznań; Adrianna Janowicz-Połtorak; Tymoteusz Zimny; Patrycja Wyciszkiewicz-Zawadzka; Jakub Olejniczak	21 February 2021		Toruń, Poland	
4 × 400 m relay	3:16.96	Poland; Kajetan Duszyński; Anna Gryc; Marcin Karolewski; Justyna Święty-Ersetic	21 March 2026	World Championships	Toruń, Poland	
