= Hartmut Koch =

East German sprinter (born 1944)

Hartmut Koch (born 14 November 1944) is a former East German track and field sprinter who competed over 400 metres. He was the inaugural champion at the 1966 European Indoor Games and was runner-up to Manfred Kinder in that event at the 1967 European Indoor Games.

He won four straight national titles in the 400 m at the East German Indoor Athletics Championships from 1966 to 1969. His time of 47.9 seconds was a championship record and the fastest time recorded in the history of that competition on a regular-size track. He represented the club SC Leipzig.

== International competitions ==
| Year | Competition | Venue | Position | Event | Notes |
|---|---|---|---|---|---|
| 1966 | European Indoor Games | Dortmund, West Germany | 1st | 400 m | 47.9 |
| 1967 | European Indoor Games | Prague, Czechoslovakia | 2nd | 400 m | 48.6 |

== See also ==
- List of European Athletics Indoor Championships medalists (men)
