= 1972 European Athletics Indoor Championships – Men's 4 × 360 metres relay =

The men's 4 × 360 metres relay event at the 1972 European Athletics Indoor Championships was held on 11 March in Grenoble. Each athlete ran two laps of the 180 metres track.

== Results ==
Rank	Nation	Competitors	Time	Notes
1st place, gold medalist(s)	Poland	Jan Werner; Waldemar Korycki; Jan Balachowski; Andrzej Badeński	3:11.1	
2nd place, silver medalist(s)	West Germany	Peter Bernreuther; Rolf Krüsmann; Georg Nückles; Ulrich Reich	3:11.9	
3rd place, bronze medalist(s)	France	Patrick Salvador; André Paoli; Michel Dach; Gilles Bertould	3:15.6	
