= 1972 European Athletics Indoor Championships – Men's 400 metres =

The men's 400 metres event at the 1972 European Athletics Indoor Championships was held on 11 and 12 March in Grenoble.

== Medalists ==
Gold	Silver	Bronze
Georg Nückles; West Germany	Ulrich Reich; West Germany	Wolfgang Müller; East Germany

== Results ==
=== Heats ===
First 2 from each heat (Q) and the next 2 fastest (q) qualified for the semifinals.

Held on 11 March

Rank	Heat	Name	Nationality	Time	Notes
1	2	Wolfgang Müller	East Germany	47.56	Q
2	2	Ulrich Reich	West Germany	47.57	Q
3	1	Alfonso Gabernet	Spain	47.81	Q, NR
4	1	Georg Nückles	West Germany	47.84	Q
5	1	Luciano Sušanj	Yugoslavia	47.84	q
6	1	Willy Vandenwyngaerden	Belgium	48.64	q
7	2	Jean-Pierre Sgard	France	49.33	
8	3	Benno Stops	East Germany	49.93	Q
9	3	František Štross	Czechoslovakia	51.67	Q

=== Semifinals ===
First 2 from each heat (Q) qualified directly for the final.

Held on 11 March

Rank	Heat	Name	Nationality	Time	Notes
1	1	Ulrich Reich	West Germany	47.58	Q
2	1	Alfonso Gabernet	Spain	47.63	Q, NR
3	1	Benno Stops	East Germany	47.75	
4	1	Luciano Sušanj	Yugoslavia	47.85	
5	2	Wolfgang Müller	East Germany	47.99	Q
6	2	Georg Nückles	West Germany	48.06	Q
7	2	Willy Vandenwyngaerden	Belgium	48.77	
8	2	František Štross	Czechoslovakia	49.55	

=== Final ===
Held on 12 March

Rank	Name	Nationality	Time	Notes
1st place, gold medalist(s)	Georg Nückles	West Germany	47.24	
2nd place, silver medalist(s)	Ulrich Reich	West Germany	47.42	
3rd place, bronze medalist(s)	Wolfgang Müller	East Germany	47.42	
4	Alfonso Gabernet	Spain	47.66	
