= Falko Geiger =

Medal record

Men's athletics

Representing West Germany

European Indoor Championships
| Silver medal – second place | 1973 Rotterdam | 4×340 m |

Falko Geiger (born 26 March 1949) is a retired West German sprinter who specialized in the 400 metres.

At the 1973 European Indoor Championships he won a silver medal in the 4 × 360 metres relay, together with Karl Honz, Ulrich Reich and Hermann Köhler.

In domestic competitions, he represented the sports club Stuttgarter Kickers. He won the silver medal at the 1974 West German indoor championships.
