= Lesław Zając =

Polish middle-distance runner

Medal record

Men's athletics

European Indoor Championships
| Bronze medal – third place | 1973 Rotterdam | 4 x 720 m relay |

Lesław Zając (born 10 October 1950) is a retired Polish runner who specialized in the 1500 metres.

He won a bronze medal in 4 x 720 metres relay at the 1973 European Indoor Championships, this time together with Krzysztof Linkowski, Czesław Jursza and Henryk Sapko. He competed in the 1500 metres at the 1975 European Indoor Championships without reaching the final. He became Polish champion in 1973.
