= Ulrich Reich =

German sprinter (born 1951)

Medal record

Men's athletics

Representing West Germany

European Indoor Championships
Silver medal – second place	1972 Grenoble	400 m
Silver medal – second place	1972 Grenoble	4×360 m
Silver medal – second place	1973 Rotterdam	4×340 m

Ulrich Reich (born 10 May 1951) is a retired West German sprinter who specialized in the 400 metres.

As a teenager he won the silver medal at the 1970 European Junior Championships.

At the 1972 European Indoor Championships he won the silver medal in the 400 metres race. He also won a silver medal in the 4 × 360 metres relay, together with Peter Bernreuther, Rolf Krüsmann and Georg Nückles. He repeated the relay silver in 1973, this time with new teammates: Falko Geiger, Karl Honz and Hermann Köhler.

In domestic competitions, he represented the sports club TSV Bayer 04 Leverkusen. He won the silver medal at the 1972 West German indoor championships.
