= Ivan Ivanov (runner) =

Soviet middle-distance runner

Personal information
- Nationality: Soviet
- Born: 26 June 1948 (age 78) Arkhipovka, Unknown, Soviet Union
- Height: 177 cm (5 ft 10 in)
- Weight: 64 kg (141 lb)

Sport
- Country: Soviet Union
- Sport: Middle-distance running

Achievements and titles
- Personal best(s): 800 – 1:46.0 (1971); 1500 – 3:37.8 (1972)
Medal record
Men's athletics
Representing Soviet Union
European Indoor Championships
Gold medal – first place	1970 Vienna	Medley relay
Silver medal – second place	1972 Grenoble	800 m
Silver medal – second place	1972 Grenoble	4×720 m

Ivan Ivanov (Russian: Иван Иванов; born 26 June 1948) is a former Soviet Olympic middle-distance runner. He represented the Soviet Union in the 1972 Summer Olympics.
