= Wolfgang Müller (sprinter) =

German sprinter (born 1943)

Personal information
- Nationality: German
- Born: 26 January 1943 (age 83) Dresden, Nazi Germany

Sport
- Sport: Sprinting
- Event: 400 metres
Medal record
Men's athletics
Representing East Germany
European Indoor Championships
Bronze medal – third place	1972 Grenoble	400 m

Wolfgang Müller (born 26 January 1943) is a German sprinter. He competed in the men's 400 metres at the 1968 Summer Olympics representing East Germany. Müller won bronze in the men's 400 metres at the 1972 European Athletics Indoor Championships, and was a three-time East German champion in the event. In 1972, he also set a world record in the 500 metres.
