= Peter Bernreuther =

German sprinter (born 1946)

Medal record

Men's athletics

Representing West Germany

European Indoor Championships
| Silver medal – second place | 1972 Grenoble | 4×360 m |

Peter Bernreuther (born 26 December 1946) is a retired West German sprinter who specialized in the 400 metres. He was born in Wurzburg, Germany.

At the 1968 European Indoor Games, he won a silver medal in the 4 × 364 metres relay, together with Horst Daverkausen, Ingo Röper and Martin Jellinghaus. At the 1972 European Indoor Championships he won a silver medal in the 4 × 360 metres relay, together with Rolf Krüsmann, Georg Nückles and Ulrich Reich.

In domestic competitions, Bernreuther represented the sports clubs SB DJK Würzburg and later TSV Bayer 04 Leverkusen. He became West German indoor champion in 1969 and 1970.
