= Georg Nückles =

German sprinter

Medal record

Men's athletics

Representing West Germany

European Indoor Championships
Gold medal – first place	1972 Grenoble	400 m
Silver medal – second place	1972 Grenoble	4×360 m

Georg Nückles (born 14 May 1948) is a retired West German sprinter who specialized in the 400 metres.

At the 1972 European Indoor Championships he won the gold medal in the 400 metres race. He also won a silver medal in the 4 × 360 metres relay, together with Peter Bernreuther, Rolf Krüsmann and Ulrich Reich.

In domestic competitions, Nückles represented the sports club Kehler FV. He became West German indoor champion in 1972 and 1973.
