= Andrzej Kupczyk =

Polish middle-distance runner

Personal information
- Born: 26 October 1948 (age 77) Świdnica, Poland
- Height: 1.77 m (5 ft 10 in)
- Weight: 64 kg (141 lb)

Sport
- Sport: Athletics
- Event: 800 m
- Club: Polonia Świdnica

Achievements and titles
- Personal best: 800 m – 1:46.3 (1972)
Medal record
Representing Poland
European Indoor Championships
Bronze medal – third place	1971 Sofia	800 metres
Bronze medal – third place	1972 Grenoble	4 × 720 m relay

Andrzej Kupczyk (born 26 October 1948) is a retired Polish runner who specialized in the 800 metres. In this event he finished sixth at the 1969 European Championships, and fifth at the 1970 European Indoor Championships, and won a bronze medal at the 1971 European Indoor Championships.

Nationally Kupczyk won the Polish titles in the 800 m in 1971 and 1973, and in the 1500 m in 1970. His best personal best time was 1:46.3 minutes, achieved in July 1972 at Bislett stadion. At the 1972 European Indoor Championships he won a bronze medal in 4×720 m relay, together with Zenon Szordykowski, Krzysztof Linkowski and Stanisław Waśkiewicz. He competed at the 1972 Olympic Games, finishing seventh in the 800 metres event.

He is the father of bobsledder Dawid Kupczyk.
