= Vladimir Kolesnikov =

Russian lawyer and politician

Vladimir Ilyich Kolesnikov (Russian: Владимир Ильич Колесников, born 14 May 1948) is a Russian lawyer and politician.

== Early life and education ==
Kolesnikov was born in Gudauta, Abkhaz ASSR, Soviet Union.

== Career ==
Between 1995 and 2000 he was a First Deputy Interior Minister of Russia. He served as the acting minister in September 1996, when Minister Anatoly Kulikov was on vacation. From 23 April 2002 until 7 July 2006, he was a Deputy Prosecutor General of Russia under Vladimir Ustinov. Since 19 July 2006, he has been a Deputy Justice Minister of Russia.
