= Rolf Krüsmann =

German sprinter (born 1941)

Personal information
- Born: 6 October 1941 (age 84) Münster, West Germany

Sport
- Sport: Track and field
Medal record
Representing West Germany
European Championships
Silver medal – second place	1966 Budapest	4×400 m relay
European Indoor Championships
Silver medal – second place	1972 Grenoble	4×360 m relay
Summer Universiade
Gold medal – first place	1967 Tokyo	4x400m relay

Rolf Krüsmann (born 6 October 1941) is a retired West German sprinter who specialized in the 400 metres.

At the 1966 European Championships he won a silver medal in 4 × 400 metres relay, together with teammates Friedrich Roderfeld, Jens Ulbricht and Manfred Kinder. Krüsmann also competed in the individual distance, and finished fifth.

At the 1972 European Indoor Championships he won a silver medal in the 4 × 360 metres relay, together with Peter Bernreuther, Georg Nückles and Ulrich Reich.

In domestic competitions, Wellmann represented the sports club VfL 1848 Bochum. He won the bronze medal at the 1966 West German championships and the silver medal at the 1967 West German indoor championships.

After retiring he became a coach. He was German 400 metres trainer from 1990 to 1996; during this period the 4 × 400 metres relay team finished third at the 1993 World Championships.
