= Michał Skowronek =

Polish middle-distance runner (born 1949)

Medal record

Men's athletics

European Indoor Championships
| Silver medal – second place | 1971 Sofia | 4 x 800 m relay |

Michał Skowronek (born 27 September 1949) is a retired Polish runner who specialized in the 800 metres and the 1500 metres.

At the 1971 European Indoor Championships he won a silver medal in 4 x 800 metres relay together with Krzysztof Linkowski, Zenon Szordykowski and Kazimierz Wardak. This team still has the Polish indoor record in the event.

Individually, he finished fifth in the 800 metres at the 1974 European Indoor Championships, and fifth in the 1500 metres at the 1975 European Indoor Championships. He became Polish indoor champion in the 800 metres in 1974, and indoor 1500 metres champion in 1975, 1977 and 1979.

His personal best time in the 1500 metres was 3.38.77 minutes, achieved in July 1975 in London.
