= Eryk Żelazny =

Polish middle-distance runner

Medal record

Men's athletics

European Indoor Championships
Silver medal – second place	1970 Vienna	Medley relay

Eryk Żelazny (born 2 December 1943 in Lubiewo) is a retired Polish runner who specialized in the 800 and 1500 metres.

At the 1970 European Indoor Championships he won a silver medal in medley relay together with Edmund Borowski, Kazimierz Wardak and Stanisław Waśkiewicz. He also competed at the 1966 European Championships and the 1969 European Championships without reaching the final.
