= 1973 European Athletics Indoor Championships =

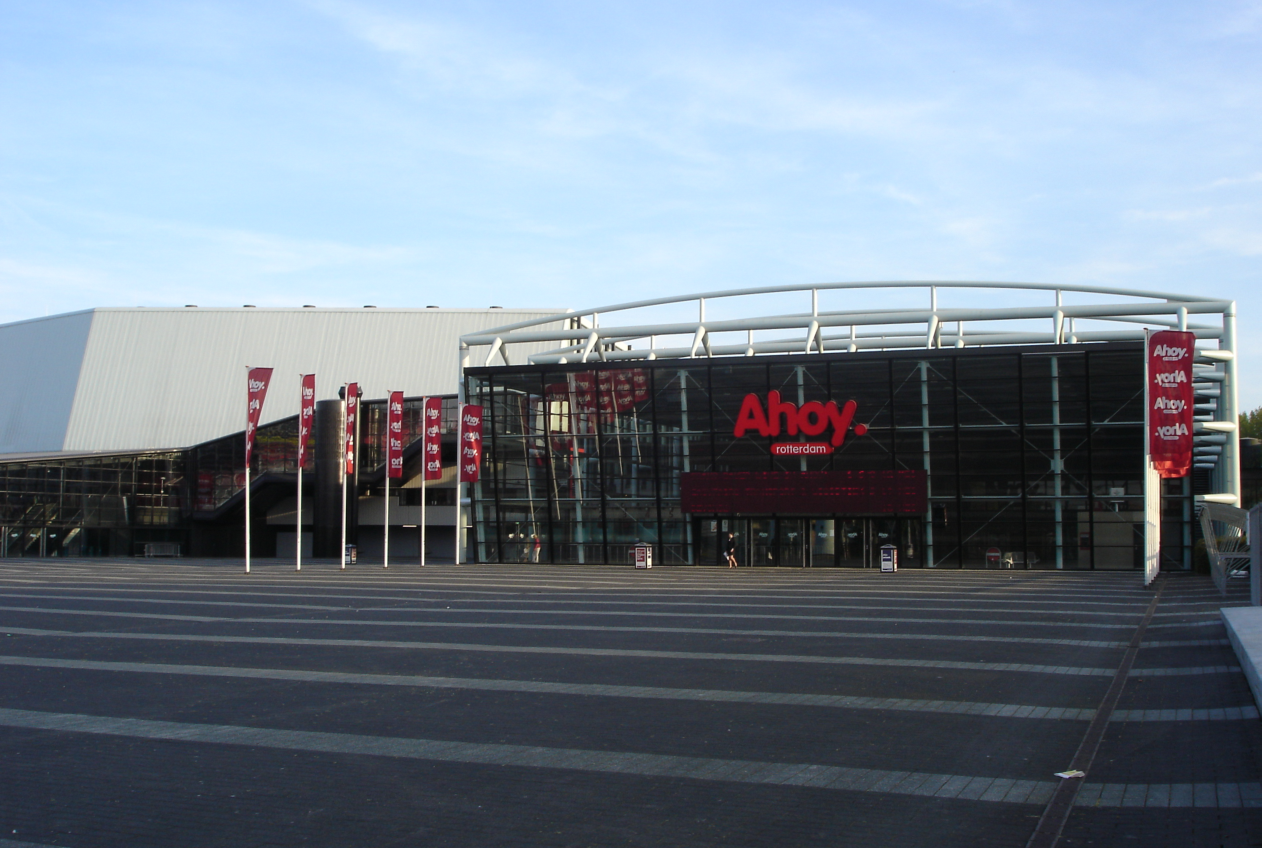
- Dates: 10–11 March 1973
- Host city: Rotterdam; Netherlands
- Venue: Ahoy
- Events: 23
- Participation: 304 athletes from 24 nations
- Records set: 7 CR

The 1973 European Athletics Indoor Championships were held on 10 and 11 March 1973 in Rotterdam, Netherlands at the Ahoy arena.

The track used for the championships was 170 metres long.

== Medal summary ==
=== Men ===
Event	Gold		Silver		Bronze	
60 metres	Zenon Nowosz (POL)	6.64	Manfred Kokot (GDR)	6.66	Raimo Vilén (FIN)	6.71
400 metres	Luciano Sušanj (YUG)	46.38 CR	Benno Stops (GDR)	47.31	Dariusz Podobas (POL)	47.40
800 metres	Francis Gonzalez (FRA)	1:49.17	Gerhard Stolle (GDR)	1:49.32	Jozef Plachý (TCH)	1:49.50
1500 metres	Henryk Szordykowski (POL)	3:43.01	Herman Mignon (BEL)	3:43.16	Klaus-Peter Justus (GDR)	3:43.36
3000 metres	Emiel Puttemans (BEL)	7:44.51 CR	Willy Polleunis (BEL)	7:51.86	Pekka Päivärinta (FIN)	7:52.97 NR
60 metres hurdles	Frank Siebeck (GDR)	7.71 CR	Adam Galant (POL)	7.76	Thomas Munkelt (GDR)	7.81
4 × 340 metres relay	France; Lucien Sainte-Rose; Patrick Salvador; Francis Kerbiriou; Lionel Malingre	2:46.00	West Germany; Falko Geiger; Karl Honz; Ulrich Reich; Hermann Köhler	2:46.42	Only two starting teams	
4 × 680 metres relay	West Germany; Reinhold Soyka; Josef Schmid; Thomas Wessinghage; Paul-Heinz Wellmann	6:21.58	Czechoslovakia; Ivan Kováč; Jozef Samborský; Jozef Plachý; Ján Šišovský	6:21.60	Poland; Krzysztof Linkowski; Lesław Zając; Czesław Jursza; Henryk Sapko	6:26.95
High jump	István Major (HUN)	2.20	Jiří Palkovský (TCH)	2.20	Vasilios Papadimitriou (GRE)	2.17
Pole vault	Renato Dionisi (ITA)	5.40 =CR	Hans-Jürgen Ziegler (FRG)	5.35	Jean-Michel Bellot (FRA)	5.30
Long jump	Hans Baumgartner (FRG)	7.85	Max Klauss (GDR)	7.83	Grzegorz Cybulski (POL)	7.81
Triple jump	Carol Corbu (ROM)	16.80	Michał Joachimowski (POL)	16.75	Mikhail Bariban (URS)	16.38
Shot put	Jaroslav Brabec (TCH)	20.29	Gerd Lochmann (GDR)	20.12	Jaromír Vlk (TCH)	19.68

=== Women ===
Event	Gold		Silver		Bronze	
60 metres	Annegret Richter (FRG)	7.27 CR	Petra Vogt (GDR)	7.29	Sylviane Telliez (FRA)	7.32
400 metres	Verona Bernard (GBR)	53.04	Waltraud Dietsch (GDR)	53.35	Renate Siebach (GDR)	53.49
800 metres	Stefka Yordanova (BUL)	2:02.65 CR	Elfi Rost (GDR)	2:02.83	Elżbieta Skowrońska (POL)	2:02.90
1500 metres	Ellen Tittel (FRG)	4:16.17	Tonka Petrova (BUL)	4:17.20	Iris Claus (GDR)	4:21.49
60 metres hurdles	Annelie Ehrhardt (GDR)	8.02	Valeria Bufanu (ROM)	8.16	Teresa Nowak (POL)	8.23
4 × 170 metres relay	West Germany; Christiane Krause; Annegret Richter; Ingeborg Helten; Rita Wilden	1:21.15	Austria; Brigitte Haest; Christa Kepplinger; Carmen Mähr; Karoline Käfer	1:23.33	Only two starting teams	
4 × 340 metres relay	West Germany; Dagmar Jost; Erika Weinstein; Annelie Wilden; Gisela Ellenberger	3:10.85	France; Colette Besson; Chantal Jouvhomme; Chantal Leclerc; Nicole Duclos	3:11.20	Poland; Danuta Manowiecka; Marta Skrzypińska; Krystyna Kacperczyk; Danuta Piecyk	3:11.65
High jump	Yordanka Blagoeva (BUL)	1.92 =CR	Rita Gildemeister (GDR)	1.86	Milada Karbanová (TCH)	1.86
Long jump	Diana Yorgova (BUL)	6.45	Jarmila Nygrýnová (TCH)	6.30	Mirosława Sarna (POL)	6.15
Shot put	Helena Fibingerová (TCH)	19.08	Ludwika Chewińska (POL)	18.29	Antonina Ivanova (URS)	18.25

== Medal table ==
Rank	Nation	Gold	Silver	Bronze	Total
1	West Germany (FRG)	6	2	0	8
2	Bulgaria (BUL)	3	1	0	4
3	East Germany (GDR)	2	9	4	15
4	Poland (POL)	2	3	7	12
5	Czechoslovakia (TCH)	2	3	3	8
6	France (FRA)	2	1	2	5
7	Belgium (BEL)	1	2	0	3
8	Romania (ROU)	1	1	0	2
9	Great Britain (GBR)	1	0	0	1
9	Hungary (HUN)	1	0	0	1
9	Italy (ITA)	1	0	0	1
9	Yugoslavia (YUG)	1	0	0	1
13	Austria (AUT)	0	1	0	1
14	Finland (FIN)	0	0	2	2
14	Soviet Union (URS)	0	0	2	2
16	Greece (GRE)	0	0	1	1
Totals (16 entries)		23	23	21	67

== Participating nations ==
- Austria (8)
- Belgium (12)
- Bulgaria (18)
- Czechoslovakia (19)
- Denmark (3)
- East Germany (27)
- Finland (10)
- France (28)
- Great Britain (12)
- Greece (3)
- Hungary (5)
- Iceland (1)
- Italy (10)
- Netherlands (20)
- Norway (2)
- Poland (30)
- Portugal (1)
- Romania (6)
- Soviet Union (20)
- Spain (10)
- Sweden (8)
- Switzerland (3)
- West Germany (44)
- Yugoslavia (4)
