= Zenon Szordykowski =

Polish middle-distance runner

Medal record

Men's athletics

European Indoor Championships
Silver medal – second place	1971 Sofia	4 x 800 m relay
Bronze medal – third place	1972 Grenoble	4 x 720 m relay

Zenon Szordykowski (born 6 July 1947) is a retired Polish runner who specialized in the 800 metres.

At the 1971 European Indoor Championships he won a silver medal in 4 x 800 metres relay together with Krzysztof Linkowski, Michał Skowronek and Kazimierz Wardak. This team still has the Polish indoor record in the event. At the 1972 European Indoor Championships he won a bronze medal in 4 x 720 metres relay together with Krzysztof Linkowski, Stanisław Waśkiewicz and Andrzej Kupczyk.

He is the brother of Henryk Szordykowski.
