= Sergey Kryuchek =

Russian politician (1963–2025)

- Сергей Крючек
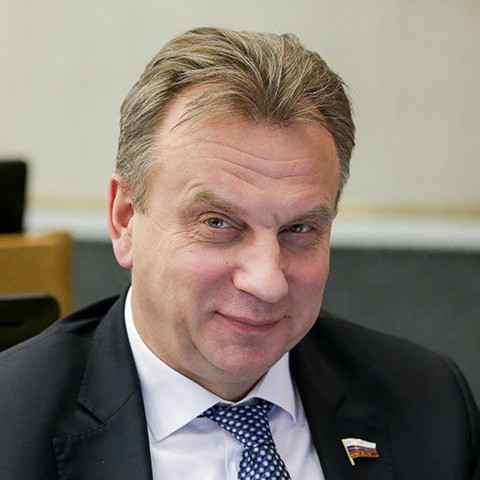
- Kryuchek in 2020

Member of the State Duma
- In office 5 October 2016 – 12 October 2021

Personal details
- Born: Sergey Ivanovich Kryuchek; 25 July 1963 Magdeburg, East Germany
- Died: 22 March 2025 (aged 61)
- Party: SR
- Education: Yaroslavl Higher Military Financial School
- Occupation: Civil servant

Sergey Ivanovich Kryuchek (Russian: Сергей Иванович Крючек; 25 July 1963 – 22 March 2025) was a Russian politician. A member of A Just Russia, he served in the State Duma from 2016 to 2021.

Kryuchek died on 22 March 2025, at the age of 61.

== Biography ==
Born on July 25, 1963, in Magdeburg, Germany.

In 1984, he graduated from the Yaroslavl Higher Military Financial School, specializing in financial support and control of the financial and economic activities of the armed forces, with the qualification of economist-financier.

In 1993, he graduated from the Military Financial and Economic University of the Ministry of Defense of the Russian Federation. He earned a Candidate of Economic Sciences degree (PhD equivalent) with a dissertation on a classified topic.

After receiving his first higher education, he served in the Armed Forces of the USSR and later the Russian Federation. Following his discharge from military service, he worked as Chief Economist at Mosbusinessbank, General Director of Intourist-Holding Company JSC, Head of the Regional Development Department at the Syndica Investment Company, Chairman of the Board of Directors of the Syndica Holding Company, and *President of the Association of Wholesale and Retail Markets in Moscow.

In the September 18, 2016 election, he was elected as a Deputy of the 7th State Duma as part of the federal list of candidates nominated by the A Just Russia political party. He was a member of the A Just Russia faction, representing Regional Group No. 28 (Kaluga, Lipetsk, and Oryol Oblasts). He served as a member of the State Duma Committee on Natural Resources, Property, and Land Relations.

He died after a serious illness on March 22, 2025
