= Krzysztof Linkowski =

Polish middle-distance runner

Medal record

Men's athletics

European Indoor Championships
Silver medal – second place	1971 Sofia	4 x 800 m relay
Bronze medal – third place	1972 Grenoble	4 x 720 m relay
Bronze medal – third place	1973 Rotterdam	4 x 720 m relay

Krzysztof Linkowski is a retired Polish runner who specialized in the 800 metres.

== Biography ==
Linkowski was born on October 26, 1949, in Gryfice, Poland.

== Legacies ==
At the 1968 European Junior Championships he won a bronze medal in the 800 metres, as well as a bronze medal in the 4 x 400 metres relay. At the 1971 European Indoor Championships he won a silver medal in 4 x 800 metres relay together with Zenon Szordykowski, Michał Skowronek and Kazimierz Wardak. This team still has the Polish indoor record in the event. At the 1972 European Indoor Championships he won a bronze medal in 4 x 720 metres relay together with Zenon Szordykowski, Stanisław Waśkiewicz and Andrzej Kupczyk. He won another medal in 4 x 720 metres relay at the 1973 European Indoor Championships, this time together with Lesław Zajac, Czesław Jursza and Henryk Sapko.

He competed in the 800 metres at the 1975 European Indoor Championships, but without reaching the final. He became Polish indoor champion in 1973.
