= Stanisław Waśkiewicz =

Polish middle-distance runner

Medal record

Men's athletics

European Indoor Championships
Silver medal – second place	1970 Vienna	Medley relay
Bronze medal – third place	1972 Grenoble	4 x 720 m relay

Stanisław Waśkiewicz (9 September 1947; Drzewica – 28 September 2012; Streamwood, Illinois) was a Polish runner who specialized in the 800 metres.

At the 1966 European Junior Championships he won a silver medal in the 4 x 400 metres relay. He competed in the 800 metres at the 1969 European Championships, but did not reach the final. He became Polish champion in 1970 and 1972.

At the 1970 European Indoor Championships he won a silver medal in medley relay together with Edmund Borowski, Kazimierz Wardak and Eryk Żelazny. At the 1972 European Indoor Championships he won a bronze medal in 4 x 720 metres relay together with Zenon Szordykowski, Krzysztof Linkowski and Andrzej Kupczyk.

Waśkiewicz spent the last 15 years of his life living in Streamwood, Illinois.
