= 1971 European Athletics Indoor Championships =

- Dates: 13–14 March 1971
- Host city: Sofia; Bulgaria
- Venue: Festivalna
- Events: 23
- Participation: 317 athletes from 23 nations
- Records set: 1 =WB, 3 WR, 7 CR

The 1971 European Athletics Indoor Championships were held on 13 and 14 March 1971 in Sofia, the capital of Bulgaria.

The track used for the championships was 200 metres long.

== Medal summary ==
=== Men ===
Event	Gold		Silver		Bronze	
60 metres	Valeriy Borzov (URS)	6.6a =WB	Jobst Hirscht (FRG)	6.7a	Manfred Kokot (GDR)	6.8a
400 metres	Andrzej Badeński (POL)	46.8 =AR	Boris Savchuk (URS)	47.4	Aleksandr Bratchikov (URS)	47.6
800 metres	Yevgeniy Arzhanov (URS)	1:48.7	Phil Lewis (GBR)	1:50.5	Andrzej Kupczyk (POL)	1:50.5
1500 metres	Henryk Szordykowski (POL)	3:41.4 CR	Volodymyr Panteley (URS)	3:41.5	Gianni Del Buono (ITA)	3:42.1
3000 metres	Peter Stewart (GBR)	7:53.6	Wilfried Scholz (GDR)	7:54.4	Yuriy Aleksashin (URS)	8:01.2
60 metres hurdles	Eckart Berkes (FRG)	7.8a	Aleksandr Demus (URS)	7.9a	Sergio Liani (ITA)	7.9a
4 × 400 metres relay	Poland; Waldemar Korycki; Jan Werner; Andrzej Badeński; Jan Balachowski	3:11.1	Soviet Union; Aleksandr Bratchikov; Semyon Kocher; Boris Savchuk; Yevgeniy Borisenko	3:11.9	Bulgaria; Krestyu Khristov; Alexander Yanev; Alexander Popov; Yordan Todorov	3:15.6
4 × 800 metres relay	Soviet Union; Valeriy Taratynov; Stanislav Meshcherskich; Aleksey Taranov; Viktor Semyashkin	7:17.8	Poland; Krzysztof Linkowski; Zenon Szordykowski; Michał Skowronek; Kazimierz Wardak	7:19.2	West Germany; Paul-Heinz Wellmann; Godehard Brysch; Dieter Friedrich; Bernd Eppler	7:25.0
High jump	István Major (HUN)	2.17	Jüri Tarmak (URS)	2.17	Endre Kelemen (HUN)	2.17
Pole vault	Wolfgang Nordwig (GDR)	5.40 WR	Kjell Isaksson (SWE)	5.35	Yuriy Isakov (URS)	5.30
Long jump	Hans Baumgartner (FRG)	8.12	Igor Ter-Ovanesyan (URS)	7.91	Vasile Sarucan (ROM)	7.88
Triple jump	Viktor Sanyeyev (URS)	16.83	Carol Corbu (ROM)	16.83	Gennadiy Savlevich (URS)	16.24
Shot put	Hartmut Briesenick (GDR)	20.19	Valeriy Voykin (URS)	19.54	Ricky Bruch (SWE)	19.50

=== Women ===
Event	Gold		Silver		Bronze	
60 metres	Renate Stecher (GDR)	7.3a	Sylviane Telliez (FRA)	7.4a	Annegret Irrgang (FRG)	7.4a
400 metres	Vera Popkova (URS)	53.7	Inge Bödding (FRG)	54.3	Maria Sykora (AUT)	54.4
800 metres	Hildegard Falck (FRG)	2:06.1	Ileana Silai (ROM)	2:06.5	Rosemary Stirling (GBR)	2:06.6
1500 metres	Margaret Beacham (GBR)	4:17.2 WR	Lyudmila Bragina (URS)	4:17.8	Tamara Pangelova (URS)	4:18.1
60 metres hurdles	Karin Balzer (GDR)	8.1a WR	Annelie Ehrhardt (GDR)	8.1a	Teresa Sukniewicz (POL)	8.3a
4 × 200 metres relay	Soviet Union; Marina Nikiforova; Tatyana Kondrasheva; Lyudmila Aksyonova; Natalya Chistyakova	1:37.1	West Germany; Annelie Wilden; Elfgard Schittenhelm; Annegret Kroniger; Christine Tackenberg	1:38.0	Bulgaria; Ivanka Venkova; Ivanka Koshnicharska; Sofka Kazandzhieva; Monka Bobcheva	1:39.7
4 × 400 metres relay	Soviet Union; Lyubov Finogenova; Galina Kamardina; Vera Popkova; Lyudmila Aksyonova	3:36.6	West Germany; Gisela Ahlemeyer; Gisela Ellenberger; Annette Rückes; Christa Czekay	3:39.6	Bulgaria; Svetla Slateva; Stefka Yordanova; Dzhena Bineva; Tonka Petrova	3:47.8
High jump	Milada Karbanová (TCH)	1.80	Vera Gavrilova (URS)	1.80	Cornelia Popescu (ROM)	1.78
Long jump	Heide Rosendahl (FRG)	6.64	Irena Szewińska (POL)	6.56	Viorica Viscopoleanu (ROM)	6.53
Shot put	Nadezhda Chizhova (URS)	19.70 CR	Margitta Gummel (GDR)	19.50	Antonina Ivanova (URS)	18.69

== Medal table ==
Rank	Nation	Gold	Silver	Bronze	Total
1	Soviet Union (URS)	8	9	6	23
2	West Germany (FRG)	4	4	2	10
3	East Germany (GDR)	4	3	1	8
4	Poland (POL)	3	2	2	7
5	Great Britain (GBR)	2	1	1	4
6	Hungary (HUN)	1	0	1	2
7	Czechoslovakia (TCH)	1	0	0	1
8	Romania (ROM)	0	2	3	5
9	Sweden (SWE)	0	1	1	2
10	France (FRA)	0	1	0	1
11	Bulgaria (BUL)	0	0	3	3
12	Italy (ITA)	0	0	2	2
13	Austria (AUT)	0	0	1	1
Totals (13 entries)		23	23	23	69

== Participating nations ==
- Austria (5)
- Belgium (6)
- Bulgaria (33)
- Czechoslovakia (15)
- Denmark (2)
- East Germany (13)
- Finland (5)
- France (17)
- Great Britain (11)
- Greece (6)
- Hungary (12)
- Ireland (2)
- Italy (9)
- Netherlands (9)
- Poland (26)
- Romania (18)
- Soviet Union (49)
- Spain (12)
- Sweden (10)
- Switzerland (5)
- Turkey (4)
- West Germany (42)
- Yugoslavia (5)
