= Kazimierz Wardak =

Polish middle-distance runner (1947–2020)

Medal record

Men's athletics

European Indoor Championships
Silver medal – second place	1970 Vienna	Medley relay
Silver medal – second place	1971 Sofia	4 x 800 m relay

Kazimierz Wardak (4 March 1947 in Połczyn-Zdrój – 25 October 2020) was a Polish runner who specialized in the 800 metres.

== Career ==
At the 1970 European Indoor Championships he won a silver medal in medley relay together with Edmund Borowski, Stanisław Waśkiewicz, and Eryk Żelazny.

At the 1971 European Indoor Championships he won a silver medal in 4 x 800 metres relay together with Krzysztof Linkowski, Zenon Szordykowski, and Michał Skowronek. This team still holds the Polish indoor record in the event.

Wardak died on 25 October 2020, aged 73.
