= 1971 European Athletics Championships – Women's pentathlon =

Women's pentathlon at the European Athletics Championships

The women's pentathlon at the 1971 European Athletics Championships was held in Helsinki, Finland, at Helsinki Olympic Stadium on 13 and 14 August 1971.

== Medalists ==
Gold	Heide Rosendahl; West Germany
Silver	Burglinde Pollak; East Germany
Bronze	Margrit Olfert; East Germany

== Results ==
=== Final ===
13/14 August

The highest mark recorded in each event is highlighted in yellow

Rank	Name	Nationality	100m H	SP	HJ	LJ	200m	Points	Notes
1st place, gold medalist(s)	Heide Rosendahl	West Germany	13.52	13.70	1.68	6.69 (w: 0.5 m/s)	23.80 (w: -1.6 m/s)	4675 (5299)	CR
2nd place, silver medalist(s)	Burglinde Pollak	East Germany	13.34	16.11	1.64	6.10 W (w: 5.1 m/s)	24.11 (w: -1.6 m/s)	4638 (5275)	
3rd place, bronze medalist(s)	Margrit Olfert	East Germany	13.56	13.96	1.64	6.50 (w: -0.1 m/s)	24.17 (w: -1.6 m/s)	4570 (5179)	
4	Karen Mack	West Germany	13.91	12.78	1.74	6.01 (w: 0.0 m/s)	24.22 (w: -1.6 m/s)	4443 (5052)	
5	Valentina Tikhomirova	Soviet Union	14.04	13.84	1.64	6.34 W (w: 5.3 m/s)	25.19 (w: -1.6 m/s)	4375 (4986)	
6	Odette Ducas	France	14.53	12.53	1.66	6.50 W (w: 5.1 m/s)	24.75 (w: -1.6 m/s)	4330 (4926)	NR
7	Tatyana Kondrasheva	Soviet Union	13.77	12.70	1.62	5.93 (w: 0.1 m/s)	24.21 (w: -0.5 m/s)	4289 (4887)	
8	Margit Papp	Hungary	14.71	13.36	1.76	6.10 (w: 1.0 m/s)	26.26 (w: -1.6 m/s)	4244 (4833)	
9	Đurđa Fočić	Yugoslavia	13.97	11.36	1.70	6.00 (w: 0.0 m/s)	25.32 (w: -0.5 m/s)	4209 (4798)	NR
10	Margot Eppinger	West Germany	14.24	12.11	1.60	6.14 (w: 0.2 m/s)	24.90 (w: -0.5 m/s)	4188 (4786)	
11	Miep van Beek	Netherlands	14.02	12.23	1.66	5.73 (w: 1.4 m/s)	25.31 (w: -0.5 m/s)	4157 (4755)	
12	Miroslava Březíková	Czechoslovakia	14.73	11.76	1.70	6.18 (w: 0.0 m/s)	25.54 (w: -0.5 m/s)	4162 (4754)	
13	Mieke Sterk	Netherlands	13.81	11.19	1.64	5.80 (w: 0.0 m/s)	24.84 (w: -0.5 m/s)	4155 (4752)	
14	Jitka Birnbaumová	Czechoslovakia	14.12	12.79	1.50	5.95 (w: 0.0 m/s)	24.82 (w: -0.9 m/s)	4101 (4702)	
15	Kathrin Lardi	Switzerland	14.67	11.73	1.72	5.79 (w: 2.0 m/s)	25.42 (w: -0.9 m/s)	4111 (4693)	
16	Roswitha Emonts-Gast	Belgium	14.46	11.40	1.72	6.75 w (w: 2.2 m/s)	26.67 (w: -0.9 m/s)	4005 (4578)	
17	Florence Picaut	France	14.76	11.63	1.66	5.88 (w: 1.7 m/s)	26.52 (w: -0.9 m/s)	3967 (4541)	
18	Dorit Würger	Austria	14.79	11.61	1.64	5.72 (w: 2.0 m/s)	26.22 (w: -0.9 m/s)	3931 (4506)	
19	Hannele Harju	Finland	15.20	9.35	1.52	6.11 W (w: 4.6 m/s)	25.88 (w: -0.9 m/s)	3721 (4279)	
20	Monique Bantegny	France	14.76	11.34	1.62	NM	25.83 (w: -0.9 m/s)	3082 (3575)	
	Monika Peikert	East Germany	14.20	13.91	1.72	5.64 (w: 1.4 m/s)		DNF	
	Nedyalka Angelova	Bulgaria	14.25	13.46	1.58			DNF	

== Participation ==
According to an unofficial count, 22 athletes from 13 countries participated in the event.

- Austria (1)
- Belgium (1)
- Bulgaria (1)
- Czechoslovakia (2)
- East Germany (3)
- Finland (1)
- France (3)
- Hungary (1)
- Netherlands (2)
- Soviet Union (2)
- Switzerland (1)
- West Germany (3)
- Yugoslavia (1)
