= Athletics at the 1972 Summer Olympics – Women's pentathlon =

Women's Pentathlon at the Games of the XX Olympiad
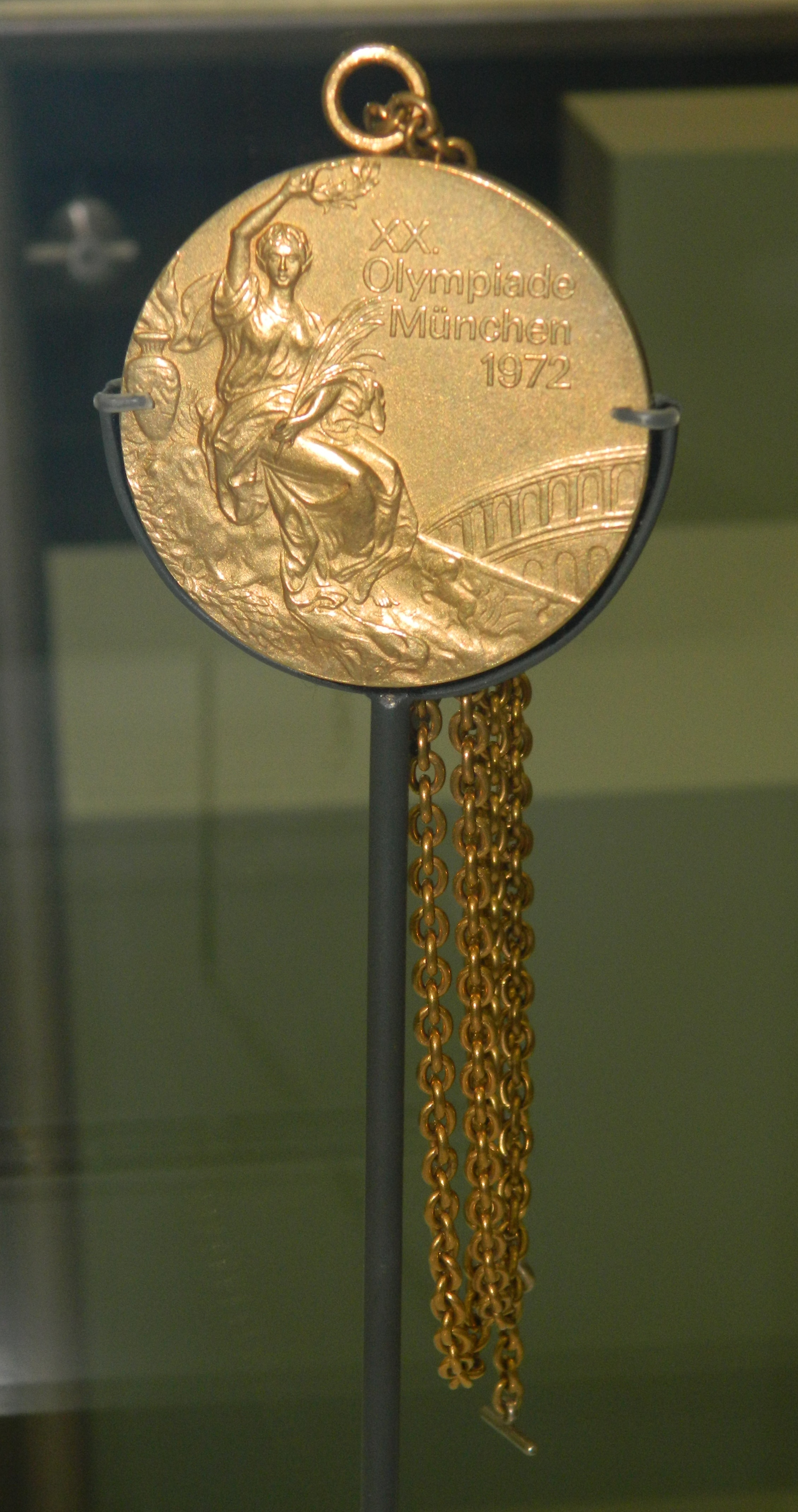
- Gold medal awarded to Mary Peters
- Venue: Olympic Stadium
- Dates: September 2 & 3, 1972
- Competitors: 30 from 20 nations
- Winning result: 4801 WR

Medalists
1st place, gold medalist(s)		Mary Peters; Great Britain
2nd place, silver medalist(s)		Heide Rosendahl; West Germany
3rd place, bronze medalist(s)		Burglinde Pollak; East Germany

The women's pentathlon combined event at the 1972 Olympic Games took place on September 2 & 3. The favorites going into the Olympics were Heide Rosendahl and Burglinde Pollak, with Rosendahl narrowly defeating Pollack, by 24 points at the 1971 European Athletics Championships. The second event saw Mary Peters release a tremendous throw in the shot put catapulting her into lead, which she never relinquished.

== Results ==
=== 100m hurdles ===
Rank	Name	Nationality	Heat	Time	Points
1	Christine Bodner	East Germany	2	13.25	966; OR
2	Mary Peters	Great Britain	2	13.29	960
3	Heide Rosendahl	West Germany	1	13.34	953
4	Burglinde Pollak	East Germany	1	13.53	927
5	Ann Wilson	Great Britain	1	13.61	916
6	Ilona Bruzsenyák	Hungary	5	13.65	911
7	Valentina Tikhomirova	Soviet Union	1	13.77	895
8	Nadiya Tkachenko	Soviet Union	2	13.81	890
9	Nedyalka Angelova	Bulgaria	1	13.84	886
10T	Modupe Oshikoya	Nigeria	3	13.96	871
10T	Đurđa Fočić	Yugoslavia	5	13.96	871
12	Marie-Christine Debourse	France	1	14.03	862
13	Elena Vintilă	Romania	5	14.06	858
14	Liese Prokop	Austria	2	14.11	852
15	Margot Eppinger	West Germany	3	14.12	851
16	Monika Peikert	East Germany	3	14.23	837
17	Edith Noeding	Peru	3	14.24	836
18	Lyn Tillett	Australia	3	14.26	834
19	Debbie Van Kiekebelt	Canada	2	14.39	818
20	Karen Mack	West Germany	2	14.45	811
21	Gale Fitzgerald	United States	3	14.47	809
22	Lucía Vaamonde	Venezuela	5	14.53	801
23	Odette Ducas	France	5	14.55	799
24	Jane Frederick	United States	2	14.60	793
25	Kathrin Lardi	Switzerland	3	14.63	790
26	Diane Jones	Canada	4	14.79	772
27	Margit Papp	Hungary	1	14.91	758
28	Lin Chun-Yu	Republic of China	4	14.98	750
29	Margaret Murphy	Ireland	5	15.18	729
30	Gladys Chai	Malaysia	4	18.46	440

=== Shot put ===
Rank	Name	Nationality	Throw 1	Throw 2	Throw 3	Mark	Points
1	Mary Peters	Great Britain	15.03	16.20	14.41	16.20	960
2	Burglinde Pollak	East Germany	15.56	16.04	15.31	16.04	952
3	Liese Prokop	Austria	15.14	x	13.93	15.14	903
4	Diane Jones	Canada	14.82	15.05	13.78	15.05	898
5	Valentina Tikhomirova	Soviet Union	x	14.56	14.64	14.64	875
6	Monika Peikert	East Germany	14.14	13.51	13.95	14.14	846
7	Karen Mack	West Germany	14.10	13.11	13.08	14.10	844
8	Nedyalka Angelova	Bulgaria	13.96	13.54	13.85	13.96	836
9	Heide Rosendahl	West Germany	13.62	13.86	13.56	13.86	830
10	Nadiya Tkachenko	Soviet Union	13.67	13.64	13.69	13.69	820
11T	Debbie Van Kiekebelt	Canada	x	13.16	12.63	13.16	789
11T	Margit Papp	Hungary	13.11	13.16	13.12	13.16	789
13	Jane Frederick	United States	12.92	12.63	12.69	12.92	775
14	Margot Eppinger	West Germany	12.70	11.78	12.65	12.70	762
15	Đurđa Fočić	Yugoslavia	12.01	12.36	12.58	12.58	755
16	Christine Bodner	East Germany	12.31	12.51	12.46	12.51	750
17	Ilona Bruzsenyák	Hungary	12.48	x	12.23	12.48	749
18	Marie-Christine Debourse	France	11.86	12.05	12.10	12.10	725
19	Lyn Tillett	Australia	11.46	10.51	11.15	11.46	685
20	Odette Ducas	France	x	10.47	11.32	11.32	676
21	Lin Chun-Yu	Republic of China	10.48	11.31	10.11	11.31	676
22	Gale Fitzgerald	United States	x	11.25	9.63	11.25	672
23	Ann Wilson	Great Britain	10.55	10.55	10.86	10.86	647
24	Elena Vintilă	Romania	8.62	10.64	x	10.64	632
25	Margaret Murphy	Ireland	9.95	10.06	10.57	10.57	627
26T	Edith Noeding	Peru	10.38	9.98	10.43	10.43	618
26T	Lucía Vaamonde	Venezuela	9.94	10.43	10.28	10.43	618
28	Kathrin Lardi	Switzerland	x	10.18	9.73	10.18	601
29	Modupe Oshikoya	Nigeria	9.66	10.00	9.72	10.00	589
30	Gladys Chai	Malaysia	x	6.95	6.89	6.95	363

=== High jump ===
All heights in metres.

Rank	Name	Nationality	Mark	Points	1.35	1.40	1.45	1.50	1.55	1.60	1.65	1.68	1.71	1.74	1.76	1.78	1.80	1.82	1.84
1	Mary Peters	Great Britain	1.82	1049	p	p	p	p	o	o	o	o	xxo	o	xxo	o	o	o	xxx
2T	Burglinde Pollak	East Germany	1.76	993	p	p	p	p	o	xo	o	xxo	o	xo	o	xxx			
2T	Christine Bodner	East Germany	1.76	993	p	p	p	p	o	o	o	xo	xo	o	o	xxx			
2T	Karen Mack	West Germany	1.76	993	p	p	p	p	p	o	o	o	o	xxo	o	xxx			
2T	Margit Papp	Hungary	1.76	993	p	p	p	p	p	o	o	o	o	o	xo	xxx			
6T	Diane Jones	Canada	1.74	974	p	p	p	p	p	o	xo	xo	xo	xxo	xxx				
6T	Jane Frederick	United States	1.74	974	p	p	p	p	o	o	o	o	xo	xo	xxx				
6T	Valentina Tikhomirova	Soviet Union	1.74	974	p	p	p	p	o	o	o	o	o	o	xxx				
9	Đurđa Fočić	Yugoslavia	1.71	945	p	p	p	o	o	o	xxo	xo	xo	xxx					
10T	Debbie Van Kiekebelt	Canada	1.68	915	p	p	p	p	o	o	o	o	xxx						
10T	Elena Vintilă	Romania	1.68	915	p	p	p	p	o	o	o	xo	xxx						
10T	Modupe Oshikoya	Nigeria	1.68	915	p	p	p	p	p	o	o	xxo	xxx						
10T	Nedyalka Angelova	Bulgaria	1.68	915	p	p	p	p	o	o	o	o	xxx						
14T	Ann Wilson	Great Britain	1.65	885	p	p	p	p	o	o	o	xxx							
14T	Gale Fitzgerald	United States	1.65	885	p	o	o	o	o	o	o	xxx							
14T	Heide Rosendahl	West Germany	1.65	885	p	p	p	o	o	o	o	xxx							
14T	Ilona Bruzsenyák	Hungary	1.65	885	p	p	p	p	p	xxo	o	xxx							
14T	Liese Prokop	Austria	1.65	885	p	p	p	p	o	o	o	xxx							
14T	Marie-Christine Debourse	France	1.65	885	p	p	p	p	p	o	xo	xxx							
14T	Nadiya Tkachenko	Soviet Union	1.65	885	p	p	p	o	o	o	o	xxx							
21T	Gladys Chai	Malaysia	1.60	834	p	p	o	o	xo	o	xxx								
21T	Kathrin Lardi	Switzerland	1.60	834	p	p	p	p	o	o	xxx								
21T	Lyn Tillett	Australia	1.60	834	p	p	o	o	o	xxo	xxx								
21T	Margot Eppinger	West Germany	1.60	834	p	p	p	o	o	o	xxx								
21T	Monika Peikert	East Germany	1.60	834	p	p	p	p	p	o	xxx								
26T	Edith Noeding	Peru	1.55	781	p	o	o	o	o	xxx									
26T	Odette Ducas	France	1.55	781	p	p	o	o	xxo	xxx									
28T	Lin Chun-Yu	Republic of China	1.50	726	p	p	o	o	xxx										
28T	Lucía Vaamonde	Venezuela	1.50	726	o	o	o	o	xxx										
28T	Margaret Murphy	Ireland	1.50	726	p	p	o	o	xxx										

=== Long jump ===
Rank	Name	Nationality	Jump 1	Jump 2	Jump 3	Mark	Points
1	Heide Rosendahl	West Germany	6.83	x	6.68	6.83	1082
2	Lyn Tillett	Australia	6.44	5.96	x	6.44	1001
3	Christine Bodner	East Germany	6.21	6.40	6.35	6.40	992
4	Nedyalka Angelova	Bulgaria	x	6.32	x	6.32	975
5	Ann Wilson	Great Britain	5.92	6.19	6.31	6.31	973
6	Ilona Bruzsenyák	Hungary	6.06	6.29	6.26	6.29	969
7T	Elena Vintilă	Romania	6.26	6.15	6.27	6.27	965
7T	Modupe Oshikoya	Nigeria	x	5.86	6.27	6.27	965
9	Burglinde Pollak	East Germany	5.96	6.21	6.19	6.21	952
10	Odette Ducas	France	6.19	x	5.97	6.19	947
11T	Nadiya Tkachenko	Soviet Union	6.08	6.18	5.97	6.18	945
11T	Margot Eppinger	West Germany	x	x	6.18	6.18	945
13	Valentina Tikhomirova	Soviet Union	x	6.10	6.15	6.15	939
14	Monika Peikert	East Germany	6.11	5.80	6.12	6.12	932
15	Karen Mack	West Germany	5.99	6.11	x	6.11	930
16	Marie-Christine Debourse	France	x	6.02	5.98	6.02	910
17T	Debbie Van Kiekebelt	Canada	5.71	5.98	5.90	5.98	902
17T	Mary Peters	Great Britain	x	5.90	5.98	5.98	902
19	Gale Fitzgerald	United States	x	5.51	5.97	5.97	900
20	Diane Jones	Canada	5.70	5.88	5.93	5.93	891
21	Đurđa Fočić	Hungary	5.92	x		5.92	888
22	Margaret Murphy	Ireland	5.65	5.41	5.62	5.65	828
23	Lucía Vaamonde	Venezuela	5.61	5.58	x	5.61	819
24T	Jane Frederick	United States	5.60	x	5.54	5.60	817
24T	Margit Papp	Hungary	5.41	5.60	4.08	5.60	817
26	Kathrin Lardi	Switzerland	4.11	5.36	3.12	5.36	762
27	Lin Chun-Yu	Republic of China	5.31	5.13	5.01	5.31	750
28	Edith Noeding	Peru	5.06	5.06	5.25	5.25	736

=== 200m ===
Rank	Name	Nationality	Heat	Time	Points
1	Heide Rosendahl	West Germany	4	22.96	1041
2	Christine Bodner	East Germany	4	23.66	970
3	Burglinde Pollak	East Germany	4	23.93	944
4	Gale Fitzgerald	United States	3	23.97	940
5	Modupe Oshikoya	Nigeria	3	23.98	939
6	Mary Peters	Great Britain	4	24.08	930
7	Margot Eppinger	West Germany	3	24.18	921
8	Valentina Tikhomirova	Soviet Union	4	24.25	914
9	Ilona Bruzsenyák	Hungary	1	24.35	905
10	Lyn Tillett	Australia	2	24.36	904
11	Edith Noeding	Peru	2	24.41	899
12	Odette Ducas	France	3	24.42	898
13	Nedyalka Angelova	Bulgaria	4	24.58	884
14	Đurđa Fočić	Yugoslavia	1	24.70	873
15	Karen Mack	West Germany	4	24.72	871
16	Margaret Murphy	Ireland	2	24.84	860
17	Ann Wilson	Great Britain	2	24.87	858
18	Marie-Christine Debourse	France	1	24.88	857
19	Debbie Van Kiekebelt	Canada	1	24.98	848
20T	Nadiya Tkachenko	Soviet Union	2	25.19	830
20T	Lucía Vaamonde	Venezuela	2	25.19	830
22	Elena Vintilă	Romania	3	25.20	829
23	Diane Jones	Canada	2	25.37	814
24	Jane Fredricks	United States	1	25.45	808
25	Kathrin Lardi	Switzerland	1	25.53	801
26	Monika Peikert	East Germany	3	25.74	783
27	Lin Chun-Yu	Republic of China	1	25.86	774
28	Margit Papp	Hungary	3	26.57	717

=== Final standings ===
Standings after Event 5
3 September 1972
Legend:M = Mark, P = Points
The best scores for each event are highlighted.

Pos	Athlete	Country	Total Points	Notes	100m Hurdles	Shot Put	High Jump	Long Jump	200m
1st place, gold medalist(s)	Mary Peters	Great Britain	4801; WR	P M	960; 13.29	960; 16.20	1049; 1.82	902; 5.98	930; 24.08
2nd place, silver medalist(s)	Heide Rosendahl	West Germany	4791	P M	953; 13.34	830; 13.86	885; 1.65	1082; 6.83	1041; 22.96
3rd place, bronze medalist(s)	Burglinde Pollak	East Germany	4768	P M	927; 13.53	952; 16.04	993; 1.76	952; 6.21	944; 23.93
4	Christine Bodner	East Germany	4671	P M	966; 13.25	750; 12.51	993; 1.76	992; 6.40	970; 23.66
5	Valentina Tikhomirova	Soviet Union	4597	P M	895; 13.77	875; 14.64	974; 1.74	939; 6.15	914; 25.25
6	Nedyalka Angelova	Bulgaria	4496	P M	886; 13.84	836; 13.96	915; 1.68	975; 6.32	884; 24.58
7	Karen Mack	West Germany	4449	P M	811; 14.45	844; 14.10	993; 1.76	930; 611	871; 24.72
8	Ilona Bruzsenyák	Hungary	4419	P M	911; 13.65	749; 12.48	885; 1.65	969; 6.29	905; 24.35
9	Nadiya Tkachenko	Soviet Union	4370	P M	890; 13.81	820; 13.69	885; 1.65	945; 6.18	830; 25.19
10	Diane Jones	Canada	4349	P M	772; 14.79	898; 15.05	974; 1.74	891; 5.93	814; 25.37
11	Đurđa Fočić	Yugoslavia	4332	P M	871; 13.96	755; 12.58	945; 1.71	888; 5.92	873; 24.70
12	Margot Eppinger	West Germany	4313	P M	851; 14.12	762; 12.70	834; 1.60	945; 6.18	921; 24.18
13	Ann Wilson	Great Britain	4279	P M	916; 13.61	647; 10.86	885; 1.65	973; 6.31	858; 24.87
14	Modupe Oshikoya	Nigeria	4279	P M	871; 13.96	589; 10.00	915; 1.68	965; 6.27	939; 23.98
15	Debbie Van Kiekebelt	Canada	4272	P M	818; 14.39	789; 13.16	915; 1.68	902; 5.98	848; 24.98
16	Lyn Tillett	Australia	4258	P M	834; 14.26	685; 11.46	834; 1.60	1001; 6.44	904; 24.36
17	Marie-Christine Debourse	France	4239	P M	862; 14.03	725; 12.10	885; 1.65	910; 6.02	857; 24.88
18	Monika Peikert	East Germany	4232	P M	837; 14.23	846; 14.14	834; 1.60	932; 6.12	783; 25.74
19	Gale Fitzgerald	United States	4206	P M	809; 14.47	672; 11.25	885; 1.65	900; 5.97	940; 23.97
20	Elena Vintilă	Romania	4199	P M	858; 14.06	632; 10.64	915; 1.68	965; 6.27	829; 25.20
21	Jane Frederick	United States	4167	P M	793; 14.60	775; 12.92	974; 1.74	817; 5.60	808; 25.45
22	Odette Ducas	France	4101	P M	799; 14.55	676; 11.32	781; 1.55	947; 6.19	898; 24.42
23	Margit Papp	Hungary	4074	P M	758; 14.91	789; 13.16	993; 1.76	817; 5.60	717; 26.57
24	Edith Noeding	Peru	3870	P M	836; 14.24	618; 10.43	781; 1.55	736; 5.25	899; 24.21
25	Lucía Vaamonde	Venezuela	3794	P M	801; 14.53	618; 10.43	726; 1.50	819; 5.61	830; 25.19
26	Kathrin Lardi	Switzerland	3788	P M	790; 14.63	601; 10.18	834; 1.60	762; 5.36	801; 25.53
27	Margaret Murphy	Ireland	3770	P M	729; 15.18	627; 10.57	726; 1.50	828; 5.65	860; 24.84
28	Lin Chun-Yu	Republic of China	3676	P M	750; 14.98	676; 11.31	726; 1.50	750; 5.31	774; 25.86
-	Liese Prokop	Austria	DNF	P M	852; 14.11	903; 15.14	885; 1.6		
-	Gladys Chai	Malaysia	DNF	P M	440; 18.46	363; 6.95	834; 1.60		
-	Ruth Martin-Jones	Great Britain	DNS	P M					
-	Eva Šuranová	Czechoslovakia	DNS	P M					
-	Marilyn King	United States	DNS	P M					

Key: WR = world record; OR = Olympic record; p = pass; x = fault; o = cleared; NM = no mark; DNF = did not finish; DNS = did not start; DQ = disqualified; T = tied
