= Athletics at the 1972 Summer Olympics – Women's long jump =

Women's long jump at the Games of the XX Olympiad
- Venue: Olympic Stadium, Munich, West Germany
- Date: 31 August 1972
- Competitors: 33 from 19 nations
- Winning distance: 6.78

Medalists
1st place, gold medalist(s)		Heide Rosendahl	West Germany
2nd place, silver medalist(s)		Diana Yorgova	Bulgaria
3rd place, bronze medalist(s)		Eva Šuranová	Czechoslovakia

These are the official results of the Women's long jump event at the 1972 Summer Olympics in Munich. The competition was held on 31 August.

== Qualifying ==
All jumpers reaching 6.30 m (20 ft 8 in) and the top 12 including ties advanced to the final round. All qualifiers are shown in blue. All heights are in metres.

=== Overall Qualifying ===
Overall	Athlete	Nationality	Group	Mark	1	2	3
1	Angelika Liebsch	East Germany	B	6.69	6.69	–	-
2	Heide Rosendahl	West Germany	B	6.62	6.62	–	–
3	Margrit Olfert	East Germany	B	6.52	6.27	6.52	–
4	Meta Antenen	Switzerland	B	6.41	6.41	–	–
5	Willye White	United States	B	6.39	6.23	6.39	–
6	Viorica Viscopoleanu	Romania	B	6.39	6.39	–	–
7	Eva Šuranová	Czechoslovakia	A	6.38	6.38	-	-
8	Ilona Bruzsenyá	Hungary	B	6.37	6.28	x	6.37
9	Sheila Sherwood	Great Britain	B	6.33	6.33	–	–
10	Heidi Schüller	West Germany	A	6.32	6.21	6.32	–
11T	Diana Yorgova	Bulgaria	A	6.32	6.32	-	-
11T	Marcia Garbey	Cuba	B	6.32	6.32	–	–
13	Jarmila Nygrýnová	Czechoslovakia	B	6.31	6.31	–	–
14	Elena Vintilă	Romania	A	6.30	6.30	–	–
15	Erica Nixon	Australia	A	6.27	6.16	6.27	5.42
16	Maureen Chitty	Great Britain	B	6.26	6.25	x	6.26
17	Sieglinde Ammann	Switzerland	A	6.26	6.26	6.13	6.04
18	Lyubov Ilyina	Soviet Union	A	6.25	x	6.25	x
19	Modupe Oshikoya	Nigeria	A	6.22	x	6.22	x
20	Odette Ducas	France	A	6.16	x	x	6.16
21	Hiroko Yamashita	Japan	A	6.14	6.13	6.06	6.14
22	Brenda Eisler	Canada	A	6.10	5.61	6.08	6.10
23	Martha Watson	United States	A	6.09	5.86	6.09	6.09
24	Debbie Van Kiekebelt	Canada	B	6.07	5.88	5.79	6.07
25	Radojka Francoti	Yugoslavia	B	6.02	6.02	5.53	x
26	Kristina Albertus	East Germany	A	6.01	x	6.01	x
27	Lyn Tillett	Australia	B	5.99	5.99	5.90	5.97
28	Ruth Martin-Jones	Great Britain	A	5.93	x	5.93	x
29	Kim Attlesey	United States	B	5.80	5.80	x	5.62
30	Lin Chun-Yu	Republic of China	A	5.50	5.50	x	x
31	Audrey Chikani	Zambia	B	5.17	4.29	5.17	4.64
–	Ingrid Mickler	West Germany	A	NM	x	x	x
–	Valeria Bufanu	Romania	A	NM	x	–	–
–	Irena Szewinska	Poland	B	DNS			

== Final ==
At the end of three jobs the top eight received another three jumps. The remaining were eliminated from medal contention.

Overall	Athlete	Nationality	Mark	1	2	3	4	5	6
1st place, gold medalist(s)	Heide Rosendahl	West Germany	6.78	6.78	6.76	6.69	6.52	6.73	6.71
2nd place, silver medalist(s)	Diana Yorgova	Bulgaria	6.77	6.43	6.12	6.62	6.77	6.53	x
3rd place, bronze medalist(s)	Eva Šuranová	Czechoslovakia	6.67	6.51	6.60	x	6.67	x	6.27
4	Marcia Garbey	Cuba	6.52	6.26	6.52	3.96	5.94	x	x
5	Heidi Schüller	West Germany	6.51	6.32	6.18	6.51	x	x	6.25
6	Meta Antenen	Switzerland	6.49	x	6.49	x	6.16	6.39	x
7	Viorica Viscopoleanu	Romania	6.48	6.43	6.48	6.48	6.44	6.35	6.44
8	Margrit Olfert	East Germany	6.46	6.42	x	6.34	6.46	6.30	x
9	Sheila Sherwood	Great Britain	6.41	6.41	x	6.40			
10	Ilona Bruzsenyák	Hungary	6.39	6.39	x	6.36			
11	Willye White	United States	6.27	6.01	6.27	x			
12	Jarmila Nygrýnová	Czechoslovakia	6.24	6.19	6.24	6.02			
13	Angelika Liebsch	East Germany	6.23	x	6.23	6.07			
14	Elena Vintilă	Romania	6.13	6.06	6.01	6.13			

Key: NM = no mark; DNS = did not start; x = fault; T = tied
