= 1966 European Athletics Championships – Women's pentathlon =

Women's pentathlon at the European Athletics Championships

The women's pentathlon at the 1966 European Athletics Championships was held in Budapest, Hungary, at Népstadion on 1 September 1966.

== Medalists ==
Gold	Valentina Tikhomirova; Soviet Union
Silver	Heide Rosendahl; West Germany
Bronze	Inge Exner; East Germany

== Results ==
=== Final ===
1 September

The highest mark recorded in each event is highlighted in yellow

Rank	Name	Nationality	80m H	SP	HJ	LJ	200m	Points	Notes
1st place, gold medalist(s)	Valentina Tikhomirova	Soviet Union	11.5	13.17	1.65	6.01	25.3	4057 (4787)	
2nd place, silver medalist(s)	Heide Rosendahl	West Germany	11.4	11.87	1.56	6.28	24.4	4048 (4765)	
3rd place, bronze medalist(s)	Inge Exner	East Germany	11.6	11.93	1.62	6.13w	25.0	3984 (4713)	
4	Mary Rand	Great Britain	11.2	10.68	1.62	6.19	24.9	4001 (4711)	
5	Annamária Tóth	Hungary	11.2	11.59	1.59	6.03	24.6	4005 (4704)	NR
6	Gerda Mittenzwei	East Germany	11.3	11.51	1.56	6.16	25.0	3950 (4675)	
7	Meta Antenen	Switzerland	11.1	9.75	1.59	6.01	25.5	3815 (4535)	NR
8	Denise Guénard	France	11.2	11.13	1.56	5.64	25.7	3722 (4483)	
9	Ann Wilson	Great Britain	11.2	9.90	1.53	6.09	25.5	3761 (4482)	
10	Oddrun Hokland	Norway	11.6	10.64	1.59	6.09w	26.3	3737 (4470)	
11	Olga Fomenkova	Czechoslovakia	11.4	11.53	1.45	5.89	25.8	3655 (4406)	
12	Nina Hansen	Denmark	11.3	10.89	1.53	5.79	26.3	3648 (4402)	
13	Sirkka Norrlund	Finland	11.3	9.65	1.50	5.72	25.1	3617 (4365)	
14	Elena Vintila	Romania	11.5	9.24	1.56	5.98	26.3	3595 (4323)	
15	Mirosława Sarna	Poland	12.3	9.31	1.53	6.03	25.0	3564 (4306)	
16	Łucja Noworyta	Poland	11.9	9.98	1.56	5.84	26.4	3524 (4280)	
16	Michele Bonnaire	France	11.6	11.54	1.53	5.25	26.2	3487 (4280)	
18	Margit Papp	Hungary	12.2	11.80	1.50	5.64	26.6	3451 (4240)	
19	Rita Vanherck	Belgium	11.9	8.66	1.62	5.52	26.4	3413 (4168)	
20	Monique Bantegny	France	12.0	11.67	1.59	4.93	25.9	3436 (4143)	
21	Marjana Lubej	Yugoslavia	11.5	9.50	1.45	5.46	25.8	3377 (4141)	
22	Magaly Vettorazzo	Italy	11.5	8.96	1.35	5.71	24.9	3390 (4120)	
23	Zhuljeta Muco	Albania	12.4	10.02	1.45	5.15	27.6	3027 (3834)	
24	Sigrún Sæmundsdóttir	Iceland	14.0	7.01	1.45	4.53	28.8	2369 (3162)	
	Charoula Sasagianni	Greece	11.9	8.78				DNF	

== Participation ==
According to an unofficial count, 25 athletes from 19 countries participated in the event.

- Albania (1)
- Belgium (1)
- Czechoslovakia (1)
- Denmark (1)
- East Germany (2)
- Finland (1)
- France (3)
- Greece (1)
- Hungary (2)
- Iceland (1)
- Italy (1)
- Norway (1)
- Poland (2)
- Romania (1)
- Soviet Union (1)
- Switzerland (1)
- Great Britain (2)
- West Germany (1)
- Yugoslavia (1)
