= Valentina Tikhomirova =

Russian former track and field athlete (born 1941)

Medal record

Women's athletics

Representing the Soviet Union

European Championships
Gold medal – first place	1966 Budapest	Pentathlon

Valentina Nikolayevna Tikhomirova (Russian: Валентина Николаевна Тихомирова; born 28 June 1941) is a Russian former track and field athlete who competed in the women's pentathlon for the Soviet Union. She was the gold medallist at the 1966 European Athletics Championships and a five-time national pentathlon champion.

She represented the Soviet Union at the Olympic Games twice (1968, 1972) and competed two further times at the European Athletics Championships (1969, 1971), placing in the top five at all four events but failing to win any medals. She had a best of 5234 points, based on the points table at the time.

== Career ==
=== Early life and European champion ===
Born Valentina Lomakina (Russian: Ломакина) in Makhachkala, Dagestan (then the Dagestan Autonomous Soviet Socialist Republic in the Soviet Union), she began to establish herself in the women's pentathlon in the early 1960s.

Fellow Soviet Irina Press was among the world's leading athletes at that time, meaning Tikhomirova had strong competition at national level. In 1963 she placed fourth at the Soviet Spartakiade, which was won by Tatyana Shchelkanova. She reached the national podium for the first time at the Soviet Athletics Championships in 1966, behind both Press and Shchelkanova. Despite failing to break into the top two at national level, her season's best performances ranked her highly at global level: she was seventh in the world in 1964 with a personal best of 4775 points, then reached the top five in the 1965 season with a score of 4763 points.

The instigation of a controversial sex verification test by the International Amateur Athletics Federation for the 1966 European Athletics Championships saw many key women miss the tournament in protest, among them Press and Shchelkanova. This left Tikhomirova as the Soviet Union's sole representative in the pentathlon and she duly won the gold medal with a score of 4787 points, extending Soviet dominance in the event since 1954 (Aleksandra Chudina and Galina Bystrova being her predecessors). She defeated West Germany's Heide Rosendahl by a margin of 22 points.

=== Olympic competition ===
The retirement of Irina Press in 1967 saw Tikhomirova enter a period of success. At the national Spartakiade in 1967 she won with a score of 4946 points –a new personal high. She ranked third internationally that season, just three points behind world leaders Ingrid Becker and Annamária Tóth. She surpassed five thousand points for the pentathlon for the first time in the 1968 season, with her score of 5008 points in Nalchik.

Nationally, she was defeated by Galina Sofina, who also managed beyond the 5000-mark. Both were selected to represent the Soviet Union in the pentathlon at the 1968 Mexico City Olympics. Sofina faltered and did not finish the final 200 metres event. Tikhomirova achieved a score of 4927 points and was knocked out of the bronze medal spot by Tóth and ended the competition in fourth place. Becker won the gold while another European, Liese Prokop, was the silver medallist.

Tikhomirova had four straight pentathlon wins at national level from 1969 to 1972, including a championship best of 5120 at the 1971 Spartakiade, which was never bettered (the heptathlon replaced the pentathlon the programme in 1981). She remained among the world's best in her event, but narrowly missed out on further medals in the rest of her career, placing fourth at the 1969 European Athletics Championships and fifth at both the 1971 European Athletics Championships and 1972 Summer Olympics.

=== Later career ===
A lifetime best of 5234 points came for Tikhomirova in Nalchik in the 1971 season. She also won the 100 metres hurdles title at the Soviet indoor championships that year – her only non-combined events title. At national level she was succeeded by Nadiya Tkachenko, who went on to become Olympic champion. In her final year of competition in 1973 she has a season's best 4754 points, which gave her a career high on the world rankings in second place behind East Germany's Burglinde Pollak.

After her retirement from active athletics she focused on coaching. She was given the Honoured Master of Sports for her efforts and trained high jumper Tatyana Denisova, among others.

== National titles ==
- Soviet Spartakiade
  - Pentathlon: 1967, 1971
- Soviet Athletics Championships
  - Pentathlon: 1969, 1970, 1972
- Soviet Indoor Athletics Championships
  - 100 m hurdles: 1971

== International competitions ==
Year	Competition	Venue	Position	Event	Notes
1966	European Championships	Budapest, Hungary	1st	Pentathlon	4787 pts
1968	Olympic Games	Mexico City, Mexico	4th	Pentathlon	4927 pts
1969	European Championships	Athens, Greece	4th	Pentathlon	4715 pts
1971	European Championships	Helsinki, Finland	5th	Pentathlon	4986 pts
1972	Olympic Games	Munich, West Germany	5th	Pentathlon	4597 pts

== See also ==
- List of European Athletics Championships medalists (women)
