= Athletics at the 1976 Summer Olympics – Women's pentathlon =

Women's pentathlon at the Games of the XXI Olympiad
- Venue: Olympic Stadium
- Dates: 25 & 26 July 1976
- Competitors: 20 from 13 nations
- Winning result: 4745

Medalists
1st place, gold medalist(s)		Siegrun Siegl; East Germany
2nd place, silver medalist(s)		Christine Laser; East Germany
3rd place, bronze medalist(s)		Burglinde Pollak; East Germany

The Women's pentathlon competition at the 1976 Summer Olympics in Montreal was held on 25–26 July. After four of the five events, with only the 200 metres remaining, the top 8 of the 19 competitors were separated by less than 100 points:

- Nadiya Tkachenko - 3788
- Lyudmila Popovskaya - 3772
- Burglinde Pollak - 3768
- Diane Jones - 3764
- Christine Laser - 3757
- Margit Papp - 3726
- Siegrun Siegl - 3718
- Jane Frederick - 3693

All of the leaders were matched against each other in the final heat. After the point scoring was calculated, Siegl and Laser had finished =1st with 4745 points, with Pollak 3rd with 4740 points. Siegl was awarded the gold medal on the basis of having scored more points than Laser in three of the five events (100 metres hurdles, long jump and 200 metres). Had Pollak run the 200 metres in 23.58 instead of 23.64, then she would have won the gold medal. While Siegl jumped from seventh to first in one event, Tkachenko had the misfortune of dropping from first to fifth in less than 25 seconds. She would go on to lead the Soviet podium sweep four years later in Moscow.

== Results ==
The best result for each event is highlighted in yellow.

Rank	Athlete	Points	100h	SP	HJ	LJ	200
1st place, gold medalist(s)	Siegrun Siegl (GDR)	4745	13.31	12.92	1.74	6.49	23.09
2nd place, silver medalist(s)	Christine Laser (GDR)	4745	13.55	14.29	1.78	6.27	23.48
3rd place, bronze medalist(s)	Burglinde Pollak (GDR)	4740	13.30	16.25	1.64	6.30	23.64
4	Lyudmila Popovskaya (URS)	4700	13.33	15.02	1.74	6.19	24.10
5	Nadiya Tkachenko (URS)	4669	13.41	14.90	1.80	6.08	24.61
6	Diane Jones (CAN)	4582	13.79	14.58	1.80	6.29	25.33
7	Jane Frederick (USA)	4566	13.54	14.55	1.76	5.99	24.70
8	Margit Papp (HUN)	4535	14.14	14.80	1.78	6.35	25.43
9	Penka Sokolova (BUL)	4394	13.32	13.70	1.64	5.93	24.95
10	Margot Eppinger (FRG)	4352	13.97	12.75	1.68	6.07	24.61
11	Djurdja Focic (YUG)	4314	14.48	12.65	1.68	6.28	24.78
12	Susan Longden (GBR)	4276	13.91	10.87	1.71	5.92	24.20
13	Gale Fitzgerald (USA)	4263	14.16	12.51	1.68	5.89	24.73
14	Tatyana Vorokhobko (URS)	4245	13.31	13.08	1.74	4.97	24.85
15	Andrea Bruce (JAM)	4198	13.94	10.23	1.82	5.50	24.66
16	Ilona Bruzsenyák (HUN)	4193	14.00	10.86	1.71	6.04	25.30
17	Marilyn King (USA)	4165	14.45	12.27	1.74	5.62	25.27
18	Miriama Tuisorisori (FIJ)	3827	14.78	9.38	1.55	5.84	24.89
19	Ana María Desevici (URU)	3628	15.49	10.60	1.60	5.28	26.45
	Edith Noeding (PER)	DNF	14.06	11.41	1.64		
