= Athletics at the 1968 Summer Olympics – Women's pentathlon =

Women's pentathlon at the Games of the XIX Olympiad
- Venue: Estadio Olímpico Universitario
- Date: October 15–16, 1968
- Competitors: 33 from 24 nations
- Winning result: 5098

Medalists
1st place, gold medalist(s)		Ingrid Becker	West Germany
2nd place, silver medalist(s)		Liese Prokop	Austria
3rd place, bronze medalist(s)		Annamária Tóth	Hungary

The Women's pentathlon competition at the 1968 Summer Olympics in Mexico City, Mexico was held at the University Olympic Stadium on October 15–16.

== Competition format ==
The pentathlon consists of five track and field events, with a points system that awards higher scores for better results in each of the five components. The five event scores are summed to give a total for the pentathlon.

== Records ==
Prior to the competition, the existing World and Olympic records were as follows.

World record	Irina Press (URS)	5246 pts	Tokyo, Japan	October 16–17, 1964
Olympic record	Irina Press (URS)	5246 pts	Tokyo, Japan	October 16–17, 1964

== Overall results ==
Key

♦ The highest mark recorded in each event is highlighted in yellow with a diamond symbol.

Rank	Athlete	Points	80 h	SP	HJ	LJ	200 m
1st place, gold medalist(s)	Ingrid Becker (FRG)	5098	10.9; 1061	11.48; 819	1.71; 1057^{♦}	6.43; 1084^{♦}	23.5; 1077^{♦}
2nd place, silver medalist(s)	Liese Prokop (AUT)	4966	11.2; 1011	14.61; 1023	1.68; 1027	5.97; 982	25.1; 923
3rd place, bronze medalist(s)	Annamária Tóth (HUN)	4959	10.9; 1061	12.69; 901	1.59; 934	6.12; 1016	23.8; 1047
4	Valentina Tikhomirova (URS)	4927	11.2; 1011	14.12; 993	1.65; 996	5.99; 986	24.9; 941
5	Manon Bornholdt (FRG)	4890	11.0; 1044	12.37; 880	1.59; 934	6.42; 1082	24.8; 950
6	Pat Winslow (USA)	4877	11.4; 979	13.33; 943	1.65; 996	5.97; 982	24.5; 977
7	Inge Bauer (GDR)	4849	11.4; 979	13.00; 921	1.59; 934	6.22; 1038	24.5; 977
8	Meta Antenen (SUI)	4848	10.7; 1096^{♦}	11.06; 790	1.62; 965	6.30; 1056	24.9; 941
9	Mary Peters (GBR)	4803	11.0; 1044	15.09; 1052^{♦}	1.53; 869	5.60; 897	24.9; 941
10	Sue Scott (GBR)	4786	11.0; 1044	11.33; 809	1.56; 902	6.20; 1034	24.3; 997
11	Jenny Meldrum (CAN)	4774	11.0; 1044	12.41; 882	1.59; 934	5.89; 964	24.8; 950
12	Marijana Lubej (YUG)	4764	10.9; 1061	10.38; 741	1.59; 934	6.01; 991	23.9; 1037
13	Nina Hansen (DEN)	4738	10.9; 1061	10.92; 780	1.59; 934	6.19; 1031	25.0; 932
14	Snezhana Yurukova (BUL)	4728	11.0; 1044	11.83; 843	1.59; 934	5.98; 984	25.1; 923
15	Monique Bantégny (FRA)	4697	11.5; 963	12.18; 867	1.65; 996	5.90; 966	25.3; 905
16	Ann Wilson (GBR)	4688	11.1; 1027	10.58; 755	1.62; 965	6.01; 991	24.8; 950
17	Marjan Ackermans-Thomas (NED)	4650	11.5; 963	12.62; 896	1.65; 996	5.65; 908	25.5; 887
18	Berit Berthelsen (NOR)	4649	11.6; 948	10.80; 771	1.56; 902	6.28; 1051	24.5; 977
19	Gerda Uhlemann (GDR)	4644	11.3; 995	12.00; 855	1.53; 869	6.02; 993	25.0; 932
20	Aída dos Santos (BRA)	4578	11.6; 948	12.41; 882	1.59; 934	5.50; 873	24.9; 941
21	Magali Vettorazzo (ITA)	4504	11.1; 1027	10.34; 738	1.45; 780	5.84; 952	24.2; 1007
22	Cornelia Popescu (ROU)	4435	12.1; 876	11.25; 803	1.62; 965	5.89; 964	26.2; 827
23	Sieglinde Ammann (SUI)	4414	11.7; 933	10.35; 739	1.53; 869	6.07; 1004	25.7; 869
24	Cathy Hamblin (USA)	4330	11.9; 904	10.66; 761	1.50; 836	5.72; 924	25.3; 905
25	Lolita Lagrosas (PHI)	4131	11.8; 918	9.93; 708	1.53; 869	5.50; 873	27.0; 763
26	Lin Chun-Yu (ROC)	4104	11.6; 948	9.82; 700	1.48; 814	5.36; 839	26.5; 803
27	Tien Ah-Mei (ROC)	3899	11.8; 918	9.04; 640	1.35; 660	5.06; 767	25.2; 914
28	Galina Sofina (URS)	3828	11.6; 948	14.43; 1012	1.59; 934	5.76; 934	DNF; 0
29	Ðurđa Fočić (YUG)	3814	11.1; 1027	11.80; 841	1.62; 965	5.90; 966	41.8; 15
30	Roswitha Emonts-Gast (BEL)	3654	11.5; 963	12.33; 877	NM; 0	5.81; 945	25.7; 869
31	Mercedes Román (MEX)	3604	11.3; 995	10.08; 719	NM; 0	5.71; 922	24.6; 968
32	Jean Robotham (CRC)	2909	13.4; 712	8.73; 615	NM; 0	4.74; 686	25.4; 896
—N/a	Gunilla Cederström (SWE)	2557	11.6; 948	10.36; 740	1.53; 869	Did not finish	
—N/a	Bärbel Löhnert (GDR)	DNS	Did not start				
—N/a	Heide Rosendahl (FRG)	DNS	Did not start				
