= 1974 European Athletics Championships – Women's pentathlon =

Women's pentathlon at the European Athletics Championships

The women's pentathlon at the 1974 European Athletics Championships was held in Rome, Italy, at Stadio Olimpico on 3 and 4 September 1974.

== Medalists ==
Gold	Nadiya Tkachenko; Soviet Union
Silver	Burglinde Pollak; East Germany
Bronze	Zoya Spasovkhodskaya; Soviet Union

== Results ==
=== Final ===
3/4 September

The highest mark recorded in each event is highlighted in yellow

Rank	Name	Nationality	100m H	SP	HJ	LJ	200m	Points	Notes
1st place, gold medalist(s)	Nadiya Tkachenko	Soviet Union	13.39 (w: 0.0 m/s)	16.07	1.74	6.36	24.20 (w: 0.8 m/s)	4826 (4776)	CR
2nd place, silver medalist(s)	Burglinde Pollak	East Germany	13.36 (w: 0.0 m/s)	15.80	1.71	6.19	24.46 (w: 0.8 m/s)	4698 (4678)	
3rd place, bronze medalist(s)	Zoya Spasovkhodskaya	Soviet Union	13.27 (w: 0.0 m/s)	14.48	1.65	6.37	24.96 (w: 0.8 m/s)	4560 (4550)	
4	Siegrun Thon	East Germany	13.58 (w: 1.0 m/s)	12.68	1.71	6.35 (w: 1.0 m/s)	23.97 (w: 0.8 m/s)	4555 (4548)	
5	Lyudmila Popovskaya	Soviet Union	13.89 (w: 1.0 m/s)	14.87	1.74	6.08 (w: -0.3 m/s)	24.60 (w: 0.8 m/s)	4547 (4548)	
6	Ilona Bruzsenyák	Hungary	13.63 (w: 0.0 m/s)	11.52	1.71	6.45 (w: 0.2 m/s)	24.98 (w: -1.4 m/s)	4407 (4399)	
7	Margrit Olfert	East Germany	13.57 (w: 0.0 m/s)	14.35	1.60	5.85	25.58 (w: -1.4 m/s)	4231 (4391)	
8	Christel Voss	West Germany	14.06 (w: 1.0 m/s)	13.76	1.80	5.85	25.58 (w: 0.0 m/s)	4364 (4384)	
9	Penka Sokolova	Bulgaria	13.42 (w: 0.0 m/s)	13.40	1.68	5.86 (w: -0.2 m/s)	25.70 (w: 0.0 m/s)	4277 (4323)	
10	Đurđa Fočić	Yugoslavia	14.13 (w: 0.0 m/s)	11.44	1.74	5.95 (w: -0.3 m/s)	24.55 (w: 0.0 m/s)	4250 (4289)	
11	Ulrike Jacob	West Germany	14.34 (w: 0.0 m/s)	10.82	1.74	6.29 (w: 1.0 m/s)	25.12 (w: -1.4 m/s)	4233 (4247)	
12	Margit Papp	Hungary	14.54 (w: 1.0 m/s)	13.64	1.74	5.91	26.42 (w: 0.0 m/s)	4159 (4207)	
13	Ann Wilson	Great Britain	14.17 (w: 0.0 m/s)	10.67	1.76	6.05 (w: -0.1 m/s)	25.62 (w: -1.4 m/s)	4151 (4182)	
14	Ciska Janssen	Netherlands	14.69 (w: 0.0 m/s)	11.95	1.68	5.94 (w: 0.8 m/s)	25.03 (w: -1.4 m/s)	4086 (4151)	
	Florence Picaut	France	13.97 (w: 0.0 m/s)	12.11	1.74	5.55		DNF	
	Snezhana Yurkova	Bulgaria	13.83 (w: 1.0 m/s)	12.63	1.68			DNF	

== Participation ==
According to an unofficial count, 16 athletes from 9 countries participated in the event.

- Bulgaria (2)
- East Germany (3)
- France (1)
- Hungary (2)
- Netherlands (1)
- Soviet Union (3)
- Great Britain (1)
- West Germany (2)
- Yugoslavia (1)
