= Athletics at the 1970 Summer Universiade – Women's long jump =

Got no idea, next

The women's long jump event at the 1970 Summer Universiade was held at the Stadio Comunale in Turin on 2 and 3 September 1970.

== Medalists ==
Gold	Silver	Bronze
Heide Rosendahl; West Germany	Elena Vintilă; Romania	Hiroko Yamashita; Japan

== Results ==
=== Qualification ===
Rank	Heat	Athlete	Nationality	Result	Notes
1	?	Elena Vintilă	Romania	6.15	q
2	?	Diane Jones	Canada	6.09	q
3	?	Heide Rosendahl	West Germany	6.07	q
4	?	Marcia Garbey	Cuba	6.03	q
5	?	Hiroko Yamashita	Japan	5.98	q
6	?	Anne-Marie Grosse	France	5.89	q
7	?	Brenda Eisler	Canada	5.87	q
8	?	Marina Samuells	Cuba	5.84	q
9	?	Heidi Schüller	West Germany	5.83	q
10	?	Alix Jamieson	Great Britain	5.82	q
11	?	Klára Woth	Hungary	5.75	q
12	?	Nadezhda Kroyter	Soviet Union	5.67	q
13	?	Onyebigua Odafin	Nigeria	5.57	
14	?	Marie-Annick Flamion	France	5.55	
15	?	Mariella Baucia	Italy	5.51	

=== Final ===
Rank	Name	Nationality	#1	#2	#3	#4	#5	#6	Result	Notes
1st place, gold medalist(s)	Heide Rosendahl	West Germany	x	6.79	x	6.70	6.69	6.84	6.84	WR
2nd place, silver medalist(s)	Elena Vintilă	Romania							6.35	
3rd place, bronze medalist(s)	Hiroko Yamashita	Japan							6.17	
4	Marcia Garbey	Cuba							6.17	
5	Marina Samuells	Cuba							6.13	
6	Brenda Eisler	Canada							6.11	
7	Alix Jamieson	Great Britain							6.07	
8	Heidi Schüller	West Germany							6.06	
9	Nadezhda Kroyter	Soviet Union							6.06	
10	Anne-Marie Grosse	France							5.90	
11	Klára Woth	Hungary							5.76	
12	Diane Jones	Canada							5.66	
