= Athletics at the 1970 Summer Universiade – Women's pentathlon =

The women's pentathlon event at the 1970 Summer Universiade was held at the Stadio Comunale in Turin on 2 and 3 September 1970.

== Results ==
Rank	Athlete	Nationality	100m H	SP	HJ	LJ	200m	Points	Notes
1st place, gold medalist(s)	Tatyana Kondrashova	Soviet Union	13.8	11.14	1.67	5.75	23.6	4884	UR
2nd place, silver medalist(s)	Nedyalka Angelova	Bulgaria						4859	
3rd place, bronze medalist(s)	Mieke Sterk	Netherlands	13.7	11.88	1.61			4828	
4	Lyudmila Skolobanova	Soviet Union	14.3	13.15	1.64	6.02	25.6	4793	
5	Ulrike Jacob	West Germany						4573	
6	Kathrin Lardi-Zingg	Switzerland		13.83	1.73			4539	
7	Shirley Clelland	Great Britain						4451	
8	Diane Jones	Canada						4428	
9	Ruth Martin-Jones	Great Britain						4418	
10	Marjeta Pronjari	Albania						4345	
11	Marita Kemming	West Germany						4331	
12	Barbara Ridi	Italy						4229	
13	Paola Guili	Italy						4209	
14	Dorit Pailer	Austria						4121	
15	Doris Langhans	Austria						3955	
16	Helga Deprez	Belgium						2802	
	Sheila Flowers	Canada						DNF	
	Elena Vintilă	Romania						DNF	
