= 1969 European Athletics Championships – Women's pentathlon =

Women's pentathlon at the European Athletics Championships

The women's pentathlon at the 1969 European Athletics Championships was held in Athens, Greece, at Georgios Karaiskakis Stadium on 18 September 1969.

== Medalists ==
Gold	Liesel Prokop; Austria
Silver	Meta Antenen; Switzerland
Bronze	Mariya Sizyakova; Soviet Union

== Results ==
=== Final ===
18 September

The highest mark recorded in each event is highlighted in yellow

Rank	Name	Nationality	100m H	SP	HJ	LJ	200m	Points	Notes
1st place, gold medalist(s)	Liesel Prokop	Austria	14.0	15.20	1.68	6.14 w	25.6 w	4419 (5030)	CR
2nd place, silver medalist(s)	Meta Antenen	Switzerland	14.3	10.05	1.71	6.42 w	25.0	4210 (4793)	
3rd place, bronze medalist(s)	Mariya Sizyakova	Soviet Union	14.2	14.05	1.65	5.98	26.7 w	4176 (4773)	
4	Valentina Tikhomirova	Soviet Union	14.8	13.21	1.68	5.95 w	26.1 w	4126 (4715)	
5	Marjan Ackermans	Netherlands	15.6	12.92	1.68	6.01 w	25.9	4116 (4701)	
6	Elisabeth Waldburger	Switzerland	14.6	13.07	1.53	6.01 w	25.4 w	4056 (4648)	
7	Sue Scott	Great Britain	14.1	11.16	1.59	6.13 w	25.8 w	4055 (4641)	
8	Burglinde Pollak	East Germany	14.6	12.80	1.65	5.55 w	26.0 w	4013 (4598)	
9	Nedyalka Angelova	Bulgaria	15.1	12.85	1.62	6.12 w	25.6	4009 (4592)	
10	Annamária Tóth	Hungary	14.6	11.70	1.53	6.07 w	26.2 w	4002 (4587)	
11	Marie-Christine Debourse	France	15.3	11.24	1.68	5.85 w	27.1 w	3852 (4419)	
12	Monika Peikert	East Germany	15.4	11.81	1.62	5.76 w	26.8	3818 (4389)	

== Participation ==
According to an unofficial count, 12 athletes from 9 countries participated in the event.

- Austria (1)
- Bulgaria (1)
- East Germany (2)
- France (1)
- Hungary (1)
- Netherlands (1)
- Soviet Union (2)
- Switzerland (2)
- Great Britain (1)
