= Athletics at the 1973 Summer Universiade – Women's long jump =

The women's long jump event at the 1973 Summer Universiade was held at the Central Lenin Stadium in Moscow on 19 and 20 August.

== Medalists ==
Gold	Silver	Bronze
Margrit Olfert; East Germany	Margarita Treinytė; Soviet Union	Brenda Eisler; Canada

== Results ==
=== Qualification ===
Rank	Group	Athlete	Nationality	Result	Notes
1	?	Margarita Treinytė	Soviet Union	6.41	
2	?	Brenda Eisler	Canada	6.30	
3	?	Margrit Olfert	East Germany	6.28	
4	?	Eva Šuranová	Czechoslovakia	6.18	
5	?	Kapitolina Lotova	Soviet Union	6.15	
6	?	Anabela Alexander	Cuba	6.14	
7	?	Johanna Kleipeter	Austria	6.13	
8	?	Alina Popescu	Romania	6.07	
9	?	Marcia Garbey	Cuba	6.02	
9	?	Myra Nimmo	Great Britain	6.02	
11	?	Hiroko Yamashita	Japan	6.01	
12	?	Sieglinde Ammann	Switzerland	6.00	
13	?	Pirkko Helenius	Finland	5.93	
14	?	Vicki Betts	United States	5.92	
15	?	Anna Włodarczyk	Poland	5.82	
16	?	Carmen Mähr	Austria	5.81	
17	?	Helen Williams	United States	5.56	
18	?	Martine Lambrecht	Belgium	5.18	

=== Final ===
Rank	Athlete	Nationality	Result	Notes
1st place, gold medalist(s)	Margrit Olfert	East Germany	6.63	
2nd place, silver medalist(s)	Margarita Treinytė	Soviet Union	6.51	
3rd place, bronze medalist(s)	Brenda Eisler	Canada	6.48	
4	Marcia Garbey	Cuba	6.44	
5	Anabela Alexander	Cuba	6.33	
6	Kapitolina Lotova	Soviet Union	6.23	
7	Sieglinde Ammann	Switzerland	6.20	
8	Hiroko Yamashita	Japan	6.15	
9	Eva Šuranová	Czechoslovakia	6.12	
10	Alina Popescu	Romania	6.05	
11	Myra Nimmo	Great Britain	5.92	
12	Johanna Kleipeter	Austria	5.87	
