= 1970 European Athletics Indoor Championships – Women's long jump =

The women's long jump event at the 1970 European Athletics Indoor Championships was held on 14 March in Vienna.

== Results ==
Rank	Name	Nationality	Result	Notes
1st place, gold medalist(s)	Viorica Viscopoleanu	Romania	6.56	
2nd place, silver medalist(s)	Heide Rosendahl	West Germany	6.55	
3rd place, bronze medalist(s)	Mirosława Sarna	Poland	6.54	
4	Burghild Wieczorek	East Germany	6.53	
5	Tatyana Bychkova	Soviet Union	6.38	
6	Meta Antenen	Switzerland	6.36	
7	Maria Devinska	Czechoslovakia	6.36	
8	Ann Wilson	Great Britain	6.33	
9	Berit Berthelsen	Norway	6.30	
10	Nina Gavrilova	Soviet Union	6.29	
11	Johanna Kleinpeter	Austria	6.23	
12	Ryszarda Warzocha	Poland	6.21	
13	Nadezhda Kroyter	Soviet Union	6.17	
14	Nedyalka Angelova	Bulgaria	6.13	
15	Agota Gulyas	Hungary	6.04	
16	Elisabeth Waldburger	Switzerland	5.90	
17	Mariella Baucia	Italy	5.42	
