= Athletics at the 1973 Summer Universiade – Women's pentathlon =

The women's pentathlon event at the 1973 Summer Universiade was held at the Central Lenin Stadium in Moscow on 16 and 17 August.

== Results ==
The highest mark recorded in each event is highlighted in yellow

Rank	Athlete	Nationality	100m H	SP	HJ	LJ	200m	Points	Notes
1st place, gold medalist(s)	Nadiya Tkachenko	Soviet Union	13.47	15.23	1.74	6.18	24.77	4629	
2nd place, silver medalist(s)	Tatyana Vorokhobko	Soviet Union	14.00	12.13	1.74	6.20	24.11	4444	
3rd place, bronze medalist(s)	Diane Jones	Canada			1.74	6.05	25.8	4370	
4	Nedyalka Angelova-Dacheva	Bulgaria						4185	
5	Jane Frederick	United States						4087	
6	Gale Fitzgerald	United States						4045	
7	Doris Langhanns	Austria						4018	
8	Erzsébet Zsom	Hungary						3635	
9	Martine Lambrecht	Belgium						3602	
10	Mercedes Román	Mexico						3487	
	Mieke Sterk	Netherlands	13.82	10.39	1.69	5.50	DNS	DNF	
	Myra Nimmo	Great Britain						DNF	
