= 1971 European Athletics Championships – Women's long jump =

Women's long jump at the European Athletics Championships

The women's long jump at the 1971 European Athletics Championships was held in Helsinki, Finland, at Helsinki Olympic Stadium on 13 and 14 August 1971.

== Medalists ==
Gold	Ingrid Mickler; West Germany
Silver	Meta Antenen; Switzerland
Bronze	Heide Rosendahl; West Germany

== Results ==
=== Final ===
14 August

Rank	Name	Nationality	Result	Notes
1st place, gold medalist(s)	Ingrid Mickler	West Germany	6.76 (w: 1.8 m/s)	CR
2nd place, silver medalist(s)	Meta Antenen	Switzerland	6.73 (w: 0.1 m/s)	NR
3rd place, bronze medalist(s)	Heide Rosendahl	West Germany	6.66	
4	Sheila Sherwood	Great Britain	6.62 (w: 1.2 m/s)	
5	Irena Szewińska	Poland	6.62 (w: 1.3 m/s)	
6	Viorica Viscopoleanu	Romania	6.39 (w: 1.3 m/s)	
7	Christa Herzog	West Germany	6.38	
8	Barbara-Anne Barrett	Great Britain	6.31	
9	Margrit Olfert	East Germany	6.29	
10	Diana Yorgova	Bulgaria	6.07 (w: 0.4 m/s)	
11	Birgitta Larsson	Sweden	6.06 (w: 1.2 m/s)	
12	Radojka Francoti	Yugoslavia	6.05	

=== Qualification ===
13 August

Rank	Name	Nationality	Result	Notes
1	Sheila Sherwood	Great Britain	6.41	Q
2	Ingrid Mickler	West Germany	6.40	Q
3	Christa Herzog	West Germany	6.40	Q
4	Heide Rosendahl	West Germany	6.40	Q
5	Irena Szewińska	Poland	6.31	Q
6	Meta Antenen	Switzerland	6.28	Q
7	Margrit Olfert	East Germany	6.25	Q
8	Barbara-Anne Barrett	Great Britain	6.23	q
9	Viorica Viscopoleanu	Romania	6.17	q
10	Radojka Francoti	Yugoslavia	6.12	q
11	Birgitta Larsson	Sweden	6.09	q
12	Diana Yorgova	Bulgaria	6.09	q
13	Sieglinde Ammann	Switzerland	6.03	
14	Tuula Rautanen	Finland	6.01	
15	Hannah Kleinpeter	Austria	5.74	
16	Margaret Murphy	Ireland	5.73	
17	Jarmila Strejčková	Czechoslovakia	5.66	

== Participation ==
According to an unofficial count, 17 athletes from 13 countries participated in the event.

- Austria (1)
- Bulgaria (1)
- Czechoslovakia (1)
- East Germany (1)
- Finland (1)
- Ireland (1)
- Poland (1)
- Romania (1)
- Sweden (1)
- Switzerland (2)
- Great Britain (2)
- West Germany (3)
- Yugoslavia (1)
