= Athletics at the 1968 Summer Olympics – Women's long jump =

Women's long jump at the Games of the XIX Olympiad
- Venue: Estadio Olímpico Universitario
- Date: October 13–14, 1968
- Competitors: 27 from 19 nations
- Winning distance: 6.82 WR

Medalists
1st place, gold medalist(s)		Viorica Viscopoleanu; Romania
2nd place, silver medalist(s)		Sheila Sherwood; Great Britain
3rd place, bronze medalist(s)		Tatyana Talysheva; Soviet Union

The Women's long jump competition at the 1968 Summer Olympics in Mexico City, Mexico took place on October 13–14.

== Competition format ==
The competition consisted of two rounds, qualification and final. In qualification, each athlete jumped three times. At least the top twelve athletes (including ties) moved on to the final; if more than twelve reached the qualifying distance, all who did so advanced. Distances were reset for the final round. Finalists jumped three times, after which the eight best jumped three more times (with the best distance of the six jumps counted).

== Records ==
Prior to the competition, the existing World and Olympic records were as follows.

World record	Mary Rand (GBR)	6.76 m	Tokyo, Japan	October 14, 1964
Olympic record	Mary Rand (GBR)	6.76 m	Tokyo, Japan	October 14, 1964

== Results ==
=== Qualifying round ===
Qual. rule: qualification standard 6.35m (Q) or at least best 12 qualified (q). Ties between jumpers were broken by comparing their second best marks.

Rank	Group	Name	Nationality	#1	#2	#3	Result	Notes
1	A	Heide Rosendahl	West Germany	X	6.54	–	6.54	Q
2	B	Berit Berthelsen	Norway	6.32	6.48	–	6.48	Q
3	B	Viorica Viscopoleanu	Romania	6.48	–	–	6.48	Q
4	A	Violet Odogwu	Nigeria	6.45	6.09	–	6.45	Q
5	B	Mirosława Sarna	Poland	6.32	6.44	–	6.44	Q
6	B	Willye White	United States	6.17	6.42	–	6.42	Q
7	A	Sheila Sherwood	Great Britain	6.42	–	–	6.42	Q
8	B	Ingrid Becker	West Germany	6.25	6.40	–	6.40	Q
9	A	Bärbel Löhnert	East Germany	6.35	–	–	6.35	Q
10	A	Tatyana Talysheva	Soviet Union	6.34	6.30	6.28	6.34	q
11	A	Maureen Barton	Great Britain	6.27	X	6.34	6.34	q
12	A	Martha Watson	United States	6.30	6.18	5.99	6.30	q
13	B	Burghild Wieczorek	East Germany	6.28	6.30	6.15	6.30	q
14	B	Ann Wilson	Great Britain	6.10	5.85	6.30	6.30	q
15	B	Manon Bornholdt	West Germany	6.27	6.09	X	6.27	
16	A	Irena Szewińska	Poland	X	6.19	X	6.19	
17	B	Marcia Garbey	Cuba	5.55	6.14	X	6.14	
18	A	Etelka Kispál	Hungary	5.98	5.93	X	5.98	
19	B	Helēna Ringa	Soviet Union	X	5.84	X	5.84	
20	A	Mercedes Román	Mexico	5.75	X	5.72	5.75	
21	A	Gunilla Cederström	Sweden	X	5.57	5.72	5.72	
22	A	Alice Anum	Ghana	5.57	5.43	5.61	5.61	
23	B	Lin Chun-yu	Taiwan	5.23	X	5.59	5.59	
24	A	Jean Robotham	Costa Rica	4.75	4.55	4.40	4.75	
—N/a	A	Sieglinde Ammann	Switzerland	X	X	X	NM	
—N/a	B	Cecilia Sosa	El Salvador	X	X	X	NM	
—N/a	B	Joan Hendry	Canada	X	X	X	NM	
—N/a	A	Nina Hansen	Denmark				DNS	
—N/a	B	Alicia Kaufmanas	Argentina				DNS	
—N/a		Maria Vittoria Trio	Italy				DNS	

=== Final ===
Rank	Name	Nationality	#1	#2	#3	#4	#5	#6	Result	Notes
1st place, gold medalist(s)	Viorica Viscopoleanu	Romania	6.82	X	6.64	6.54	6.52	6.57	6.82	WR
2nd place, silver medalist(s)	Sheila Sherwood	Great Britain	6.60	X	6.50	6.59	6.68	6.61	6.68	
3rd place, bronze medalist(s)	Tatyana Talysheva	Soviet Union	6.55	6.66	5.38	6.38	4.49	X	6.66	
4	Burghild Wieczorek	East Germany	X	6.48	6.45	6.33	6.42	6.25	6.48	
5	Mirosława Sarna	Poland	6.47	X	4.98	6.44	6.31	6.45	6.47	
6	Ingrid Becker	West Germany	X	6.32	X	6.43	X	6.27	6.43	
7	Berit Berthelsen	Norway	6.38	6.40	6.27	6.22	X	6.32	6.40	
8	Heide Rosendahl	West Germany	X	X	6.24	6.05	6.37	6.40	6.40	
9	Violet Odogwu	Nigeria	6.23	5.89	6.15	—N/a			6.23	
10	Martha Watson	United States	6.20	X	6.06	—N/a			6.20	
11	Willye White	United States	6.01	5.44	6.08	—N/a			6.08	
12	Maureen Barton	Great Britain	5.93	X	5.95	—N/a			5.95	
13	Ann Wilson	Great Britain	X	5.90	5.59	—N/a			5.90	
14	Bärbel Löhnert	East Germany	X	X	4.49	—N/a			4.49	
