= Liebsch =

Liebsch is a German language surname derived from a given name beginning with Lib "beloved, dear". Notable people with the name include:

- Angelika Liebsch (1950), German athlete
- Georg Liebsch (1911–1998), German featherweight weightlifter
