= Ilona Bruzsenyák =

Hungarian athletics competitor

Medal record

Women's athletics

Representing Hungary

European Championships
Gold medal – first place	1974 Rome	Long jump

Ilona Bruzsenyák (born 14 September 1950) is a Hungarian former track and field athlete who competed in the women's pentathlon, long jump and 100 metres hurdles. She was the gold medallist in the long jump at the 1974 European Athletics Championships. Bruzsenyák represented her nation at the Summer Olympics in 1972 and 1976, competing in both long jump and pentathlon. She was a ten-time national champion at the Hungarian Athletics Championships.

== Career ==
Born in Pócsmegyer in Hungary's Pest County, she joined the Debreceni Egyetem athletics club in Debrecen before moving to Budapest and training with Újpesti TE. Her first national title came at the Hungarian Athletics Championships in 1971, where she won the women's pentathlon in a meet record of 4897 points, succeeding Margit Papp to the crown. An international debut followed at the 1971 European Athletics Championships. Papp was chosen as the representative in the pentathlon so Bruzsenyák competed as part of the 4 × 100 metres relay team and she led off the team of Margit Nemesházi, Györgyi Balogh and Katalin Papp to take fifth place.

She was a double national champion in 1972, winning in both pentathlon and 100 metres hurdles. She was chosen to compete for Hungary at the 1972 Summer Olympics and finished tenth in the long jump and eighth in the pentathlon (outperforming Papp in latter). She repeated her national wins in 1973 and made her first outing at a major international indoors, taking fifth in the 60 metres hurdles at the 1973 European Athletics Indoor Championships. She also topped the podium at the pentathlon semi-final of the European Combined Events Cup.

The peak of her career came in the 1974 season. She started with an indoor national double in the 60 m hurdles and 60 metres sprint. She placed sixth at the 1974 European Athletics Indoor Championships in the hurdles. Outdoors she proved herself as Hungary's most versatile athlete with wins in the long jump, 100 m hurdles and pentathlon. Her winning mark of 6.63 m (21 ft 9 in) in the long jump was a personal best for the athlete and a Hungarian championship record. She was selected for both long jump at the pentathlon at the 1974 European Athletics Championships. Her first final was the long jump and she produced a lifetime best performance of 6.65 m (21 ft 9 3/4 in) to break the Hungarian national record and take the gold medal ahead of Eva Šuranová of Czechoslovakia. Despite this additional efforts, she still managed to place sixth in the pentathlon event and was the only athlete in the top seven not to come from either East Germany or the Soviet Union. For her achievements she was chosen as the Hungarian Sportswoman of the Year.

Bruzsenyák did not compete in major international competition in 1975, but took national indoor titles in the hurdles and long jump that year. The 1976 season was her last at a high level. She was the sprint hurdles champion indoors and outdoors. Alongside the national champions Ildikó Erdélyi and Margit Papp, she was chosen again for the long jump and pentathlon at the Olympics. At the 1976 Montreal Games her decline on the international scene was evident as she failed to progress beyond the long jump qualifiers and dropped to sixteenth in the pentathlon rankings. The following year she won the last national title of her career, the indoor 60 m hurdles.

Bruzsenyák married Lajos Gresa, a fellow Hungarian international athlete.

== National titles ==
- Hungarian Athletics Championships
  - 100 metres hurdles: 1972, 1973, 1974, 1976
  - Long jump: 1974
  - Women's pentathlon: 1971, 1972, 1973, 1974, 1975
- Hungarian Indoor Athletics Championships
  - 60 metres: 1974
  - 60 metres hurdles: 1974, 1975, 1976, 1977
  - Long jump: 1975

== International competitions ==
Year	Competition	Venue	Position	Event	Notes
1971	European Championships	Helsinki, Finland	5th	4 × 100 m relay	44.78
1972	Olympic Games	Munich, Germany	10th	Long jump	6.39 m
1972	Olympic Games	Munich, Germany	8th	Pentathlon	4419 pts
1973	European Indoor Championships	Rotterdam, Netherlands	5th	60 m hurdles	8.32
1973	European Combined Events Cup (semis)	Innsbruck, Austria	1st	Pentathlon	4617 pts
1974	European Indoor Championships	Gothenburg, Sweden	6th	60 m hurdles	8.39
1974	European Championships	Rome, Italy	1st	Long jump	6.65 m
1974	European Championships	Rome, Italy	6th	Pentathlon	4407 pts
1976	Olympic Games	Montreal, Canada	22nd (q)	Long jump	6.02 m
1976	Olympic Games	Montreal, Canada	16th	Pentathlon	4193 pts

== Personal bests ==
- 100 metres hurdles: 13.1 seconds (1974)
- 60 metres hurdles: 8.32 seconds (1973)
- Long jump: 6.65 m (21 ft 9 3/4 in) (1974)
- Women's pentathlon (1971 scoring): 4897 pts (1971)
- Women's pentathlon (post-1971 scoring): 4617 pts (1973)

== See also ==
- List of European Athletics Championships medalists (women)

Awards
Preceded by Ildikó Tordasi	Hungarian Sportswoman of the Year; 1974	Succeeded by Mariann Ambrus
