= Athletics at the 1970 Summer Universiade – Women's 4 × 100 metres relay =

The women's 4 × 100 metres relay event at the 1970 Summer Universiade was held at the Stadio Comunale in Turin on 5 and 6 September 1970.

== Results ==
=== Heats ===
Rank	Heat	Nation	Athletes	Time	Notes
1	1	Hungary	Éva Pusztai, Judit Szabóné, Györgyi Balogh, Klára Woth	45.3	Q
2	1	United States	Linda Reynolds, Judy Murphy, Pat Hawkins, Barbara Ferrell	46.0	Q
3	1	Poland	Danuta Straszyńska, Teresa Sukniewicz, Barbara Walisiak, Hanna Kowal	46.2	Q
4	1	Italy	Alessandra Orselli, Franca Di Meglio, Cecilia Molinari, Michaela Poggipollini	46.5	
1	2	Soviet Union	Lyudmila Zharkowa, Marina Nikiforova, Lyudmila Golomazova, Tatyana Kondrasheva	44.6	Q
2	2	West Germany	Heidi Schüller, Kirsten Roggenkamp, Hannelore Groh, Heide Rosendahl	45.4	Q
3	2	Great Britain	Shirley Clelland, Sheila Garnett, Jean O'Neill, Della Pascoe	45.4	Q
4	2	Netherlands	Henriette Vooys, Wilma van den Berg, Josje Rademaker, Mieke Sterk	45.5	q
5	2	France	Dominique Descatoire, Claudine Meire, Michèle Alayrangues, Agnès Raffin	46.2	q

=== Final ===
Rank	Nation	Athletes	Time	Notes
1st place, gold medalist(s)	Soviet Union	Lyudmila Zharkowa, Marina Nikiforova, Lyudmila Golomazova, Tatyana Kondrasheva	44.7	
2nd place, silver medalist(s)	Hungary	Éva Pusztai, Judit Szabóné, Györgyi Balogh, Klára Woth	45.1	
3rd place, bronze medalist(s)	West Germany	Heidi Schüller, Kirsten Roggenkamp, Hannelore Groh, Heide Rosendahl	45.4	
4	Netherlands	Henriette Vooys, Wilma van den Berg, Josje Rademaker, Mieke Sterk	45.6	
5	United States	Linda Reynolds, Judy Murphy, Pat Hawkins, Barbara Ferrell	45.8	
6	Great Britain	Shirley Clelland, Sheila Garnett, Jean O'Neill, Della Pascoe	45.9	
7	Poland	Danuta Straszyńska, Teresa Sukniewicz, Barbara Walisiak, Hanna Kowal	46.4	
8	France	Dominique Descatoire, Claudine Meire, Michèle Alayrangues, Agnès Raffin	46.4	
