= Athletics at the 1971 Pan American Games – Women's long jump =

Women's long jump at the Pan American Games

The women's long jump event at the 1971 Pan American Games was held in Cali on 31 July and 1 August.

== Medalists ==
Gold	Silver	Bronze
Brenda Eisler; Canada	Silvina Pereira da Silva; Brazil	Marina Samuells; Cuba

== Results ==
=== Qualification ===
Rank	Name	Nationality	Result	Notes
1	Brenda Eisler	Canada	6.31	q
2	Silvina Pereira da Silva	Brazil	6.18	q
3	Yvonne Saunders	Jamaica	6.13	q
4	Penny May	Canada	6.03	q
5	Marina Samuells	Cuba	5.97	q
6	Marcia Garbey	Cuba	5.93	q
7	Moranda Lacy	United States	5.79	q
8	Silvia Kinzel	Chile	5.76	q
9	Ana Clara Goldman	Argentina	5.66	q
10	Edith Noeding	Peru	5.62	q
11	Willye White	United States	5.59	q
12	Branwen Smith	Bermuda	5.54	q
13	Ana María Udini	Uruguay	5.41	
14	Joyce Veira	Suriname	5.05	
15	Russell Carrero	Nicaragua	4.75	

=== Final ===
Rank	Name	Nationality	Result	Notes
1st place, gold medalist(s)	Brenda Eisler	Canada	6.43	GR
2nd place, silver medalist(s)	Silvina Pereira da Silva	Brazil	6.35	
3rd place, bronze medalist(s)	Marina Samuells	Cuba	6.14	
4	Penny May	Canada	6.13	
5	Yvonne Saunders	Jamaica	6.01	
6	Moranda Lacy	United States	5.95	
7	Marcia Garbey	Cuba	5.87	
8	Ana Clara Goldman	Argentina	5.75	
9	Branwen Smith	Bermuda	5.64	
10	Silvia Kinzel	Chile	5.61	
11	Edith Noeding	Peru	5.31	
	Willye White	United States	DNS	
