= Athletics at the 1967 Summer Universiade – Women's long jump =

The women's long jump event at the 1967 Summer Universiade was held at the National Olympic Stadium in Tokyo on 3 September 1967.

== Results ==
Rank	Name	Nationality	Result	Notes
1st place, gold medalist(s)	Sheila Parkin	Great Britain	6.32	
2nd place, silver medalist(s)	Bärbel Palmié	West Germany	6.17	
3rd place, bronze medalist(s)	Anne-Marie Grosse	France	5.96	
4	Hanna Kleinpeter	Austria	5.93	
5	Maureen Barton	Great Britain	5.82	
6	Kimiko Yoshida	Japan	5.81	
7	Sachiko Kawashima	Japan	5.77	
8	Pirkko Heikkilä	Finland	5.74	
9	Liese Prokop	Austria	5.39	
