= Athletics at the 1970 British Commonwealth Games – Women's pentathlon =

Women's pentathlon at the 1970 British Commonwealth Games
- Venue: Meadowbank Stadium, Edinburgh
- Dates: 24 July 1970

Medalists
gold medal	Mary Peters	Northern Ireland
silver medal	Ann Wilson	England
bronze medal	Jenny Meldrum	Canada

The women's pentathlon event at the 1970 British Commonwealth Games was held on 24 July at the Meadowbank Stadium in Edinburgh, Scotland. It was the first time that women's combined events were contested at the Games.

== Results ==
† The highest mark recorded in each event is highlighted in yellow and marked with a dagger, †

Results by event: abbreviations listed after table
Rank	Athlete	Nationality	100m H	SP	HJ	LJ	200m	Points	Notes
1st place, gold medalist(s)	Mary Peters	Northern Ireland	13.6	16.13†	1.66	5.73	24.3†	5148	GR
2nd place, silver medalist(s)	Ann Wilson	England	13.6	11.04	1.72†	6.55†	24.6	5037	
3rd place, bronze medalist(s)	Jenny Meldrum	Canada	14.2	13.11	1.57	5.73	24.8	4736	
4	Moira Walls	Scotland	14.0	9.28	1.69	6.39	25.5	4704	
5	Susan Scott	England	13.7	11.58	1.48	5.94	24.7	4681	
6	Ruth Martin-Jones	Wales	15.0	10.96	1.54	5.95	24.9	4497	
7	Shirley Clelland	England	14.4	10.21	1.51	5.95	25.2	4458	
8	Yvonne Saunders	Jamaica	14.8	9.13	1.69	5.70	25.4	4441	
9	Modupe Oshikoya	Nigeria	14.9	7.93	1.69	5.89	25.0	4411	
10	Diane Jones	Canada	15.5	12.79	1.66	5.45	27.1	4388	
11	Lindy Carruthers	Scotland	14.2	9.19	1.48	5.59	25.5	4265	
12	Moira Niccol	Scotland	14.4	8.68	1.51	5.61	25.5	4236	
13	June Hirst	Wales	14.7	8.37	1.54	5.59	25.9	4165	
14	Anita De Gregory	Bahamas	16.0	8.49	1.40	5.21	25.6	3801	
15	Genevieve Carosin	Mauritius	18.1	7.66	1.40	5.14	27.0	3403	
	Pam Kilborn	Australia	13.3†	9.60	?.??	–	–	DNF	
	Penny McCallum	Australia	13.7	8.23	?.??	–	–	DNF	
	Maureen Caird	Australia	13.5	?.??	–	–	–	DNF	
	Barbara Poulsen	New Zealand	DNS	–	–	–	–	DNS	

=== Abbreviations in table headings ===
In the order they appear:

- H – Hurdles
- SP – Shot put
- HJ – High jump
- LJ – Long jump
