= Margaret Murphy =

Margaret Murphy may refer to:

- Margaret Murphy (writer) (born 1959), crime writer
- Digit Murphy (Margaret Pearl Murphy, born 1961), president of Metropolitan Riveters of the Premier Hockey Federation
- Margaret "Peggy" Murphy (1930–2016), American politician
- Margaret Murphy (Paralympian), Australian Paralympic athlete
- Margaret Murphy (Olympian) (born 1944), Irish Olympic hurdler
- Margaret (Maggie) Murphy, Irish suffragette was one of the Cadiz sisters
- Margaret Murphy (Sons of Anarchy), a character from the TV series Sons of Anarchy

== See also ==
- Murphy (surname)
