= Marcia Garbey =

Cuban long jumper (1949–2024)

Personal information
- Full name: Marcia Alejandra Garbey Montell
- Born: 9 February 1949 Santiago de Cuba, Cuba
- Died: 1 January 2024 (aged 74) Santiago de Cuba, Cuba
- Height: 1.62 m (5 ft 4 in)
- Weight: 56 kg (123 lb)

Sport
- Sport: Athletics
- Events: Long jump, pentathlon
Medal record
Representing Cuba
Pan American Games
Gold medal – first place	1967 Winnipeg	4x100m relay
Central American and Caribbean Games
Gold medal – first place	1970 Panama City	Long jump
Gold medal – first place	1974 Santo Domingo	Long jump
Silver medal – second place	1970 Panama City	Pentathlon
Bronze medal – third place	1966 San Juan	Long jump

Marcia Alejandra Garbey Montell (9 February 1949 – 1 January 2024) was a Cuban athlete. She competed in the women's long jump at the 1968 Summer Olympics and the 1972 Summer Olympics. She was Cuba's first Olympic long jump finalist in 1972 when she finished fourth in Munich.

Garbey died in Santiago de Cuba on 1 January 2024, at the age of 74.

Her personal best in the long jump was 6.62 metres set in 1975.

== International competitions ==
Year	Competition	Venue	Position	Event	Notes
Representing Cuba
1966	Central American and Caribbean Games	San Juan, Puerto Rico	3rd	Long jump	5.47 m
1967	Pan American Games	Winnipeg, Canada	1st	4 × 100 m relay	44.63 s
1967	Pan American Games	Winnipeg, Canada	6th	Long jump	5.99 m
1968	Olympic Games	Mexico City, Mexico	17th (q)	Long jump	6.14 m
1969	Central American and Caribbean Championships	Havana, Cuba	1st	4 × 100 m relay	45.9 s
1969	Central American and Caribbean Championships	Havana, Cuba	2nd	Long jump	6.07 m
1970	Central American and Caribbean Games	Panama City, Panama	1st	Long jump	6.60 m
1970	Central American and Caribbean Games	Panama City, Panama	2nd	Pentathlon	4428 pts
1970	Universiade	Turin, Italy	4th	Long jump	6.17 m
1971	Central American and Caribbean Championships	Kingston, Jamaica	2nd	Long jump	5.68 m
1971	Central American and Caribbean Championships	Kingston, Jamaica	3rd	Pentathlon	4122 pts
1971	Pan American Games	Cali, Colombia	7th	Long jump	5.87 m
1971	Pan American Games	Cali, Colombia	–	Pentathlon	DNF
1972	Olympic Games	Munich, West Germany	4th	Long jump	6.52 m
1973	Central American and Caribbean Championships	Maracaibo, Venezuela	1st	Long jump	6.04 m
1973	Universiade	Moscow, Soviet Union	4th	Long jump	6.44 m
1974	Central American and Caribbean Games	Santo Domingo, Dominican Republic	1st	Long jump	6.48 m
1975	Pan American Games	Mexico City, Mexico	5th	Long jump	6.38 m
