= Mariya Sizyakova =

Soviet pentathlete

Personal information
- Nationality: Soviet
- Born: 3 September 1935 (age 90) Nizhny Novgorod, Soviet Union

Sport
- Sport: Athletics
- Event: Pentathlon
Medal record
Women's athletics
Representing Soviet Union
European Championships
Bronze medal – third place	1969 Athens	Pentathlon

Mariya Sizyakova (born 3 September 1935) is a Soviet athlete. She competed in the women's pentathlon at the 1964 Summer Olympics.
