= Kristine Nitzsche =

East German athletics competitor

Medal record

Women's athletics

Representing East Germany

European Championships
Bronze medal – third place	1978 Prague	Pentathlon

Kristine Nitzsche (born 1 June 1959 in Leipzig) is a retired East German athlete who competed in the pentathlon and high jump.

== Biography ==
She won both events at the 1977 European Junior Championships. At the 1978 European Championships she won the bronze medal in the pentathlon and finished eleventh in the high jump. She represented the sports team SC Cottbus and won the silver medal at the 1979 East German championships. Her personal best jump was 1.95 metres, achieved in July 1979 in Schielleiten. She won the Hochsprung mit Musik in 1979 with a then meet record of 1.86 m.
