= Audrey Chikani =

Zambian athlete

Personal information
- Nationality: Zambian
- Born: 30 August 1954 (age 71)

Sport
- Sport: Athletics
- Event: Long jump

Audrey Chikani-Muhundika (born 30 August 1954) is a Zambian athlete. She competed in the women's long jump at the 1972 Summer Olympics.
