= 1978 European Athletics Championships – Women's pentathlon =

Women's pentathlon at the European Athletics Championships

The women's pentathlon at the 1978 European Athletics Championships was held in Prague, Czechoslovakia (now in the Czech Republic), at Stadion Evžena Rošického on 1 and 2 September 1978.

== Medalists ==
Gold	Margit Papp; Hungary
Silver	Burglinde Pollak; East Germany
Bronze	Kristine Nitzsche; East Germany

== Results ==
=== Final ===
1/2 September

The highest mark recorded in each event is highlighted in yellow

Rank	Name	Nationality	100m H	SP	HJ	LJ	800m	Points	Notes
1st place, gold medalist(s)	Margit Papp	Hungary	13.70 (w: 0.5 m/s)	15.41	1.81	6.22 (w: -0.9 m/s)	2:16.2	4694 (4655)	
2nd place, silver medalist(s)	Burglinde Pollak	East Germany	13.48 (w: 0.5 m/s)	16.64	1.65	6.17 (w: 0.4 m/s)	2:15.0	4614 (4600)	
3rd place, bronze medalist(s)	Kristine Nitzsche	East Germany	14.02 (w: -0.4 m/s)	12.77	1.93	6.13 (w: 0.8 m/s)	2:12.7	4648 (4599)	
4	Beatrix Philipp	West Germany	14.65 (w: -0.4 m/s)	17.95	1.77	6.03 (w: -1.2 m/s)	2:19.2	4582 (4554)	
5	Yekaterina Smirnova	Soviet Union	13.43 (w: 0.5 m/s)	14.10	1.79	6.13 (w: -0.7 m/s)	2:19.7	4545 (4534)	
6	Ramona Neubert	East Germany	14.14 (w: 0.5 m/s)	13.29	1.75	6.33 (w: -1.2 m/s)	2:21.3	4381 (4380)	
7	Ina Losch	West Germany	15.03 (w: 0.5 m/s)	12.14	1.79	6.23 (w: -2.0 m/s)	2:13.97	4302 (4319)	
8	Florence Picaut	France	13.98 (w: 0.5 m/s)	13.16	1.83	5.80 (w: 0.4 m/s)	2:25.0	4281 (4307)	
9	Marcela Koblasová	Czechoslovakia	14.35 (w: -0.4 m/s)	13.38	1.71	6.00 (w: -0.6 m/s)	2:24.6	4161 (4210)	
10	Cornelia Sulek	West Germany	14.66 (w: -0.3 m/s)	14.78	1.79	5.44 (w: 0.4 m/s)	2:24.7	4143 (4202)	
11	Els Stolk	Netherlands	14.72 (w: -0.3 m/s)	12.22	1.77	5.83 (w: 1.1 m/s)	2:18.73	4135 (4190)	
12	Sylvia Barlag	Netherlands	14.47 (w: 0.5 m/s)	11.56	1.79	5.91 (w: -1.5 m/s)	2:21.0	4143 (4184)	
13	Yvette Wray	Great Britain	13.96 (w: 0.5 m/s)	12.04	1.67	5.83 (w: 2.0 m/s)	2:18.9	4103 (4171)	
14	Angela Weiss	Switzerland	14.03 (w: 0.5 m/s)	11.18	1.73	5.94 (w: -1.3 m/s)	2:20.9	4114 (4165)	
15	Gabriela Ionescu	Romania	14.52 (w: -0.3 m/s)	11.29	1.71	6.06 (w: 0.4 m/s)	2:18.9	4094 (4145)	
16	Breda Lorenci	Yugoslavia	14.36 (w: -0.3 m/s)	12.86	1.71	5.60 (w: 1.4 m/s)	2:20.1	4064 (4144)	
17	Sue Mapstone	Great Britain	14.28 (w: 0.5 m/s)	10.99	1.73	5.58 (w: 0.4 m/s)	2:24.8	3906 (3993)	
18	Annette Tånnander	Sweden	14.80 (w: -0.3 m/s)	11.35	1.85	5.70 (w: 0.4 m/s)		3286 (3364)	
	Danuta Cały	Poland	14.48 (w: -0.4 m/s)	12.99	1.77	NM		DNF	
	Nadiya Tkachenko	Soviet Union	13.32 (w: 0.5 m/s)	15.11	1.79	6.31 (w: 0.4 m/s)	2:12.25	DQ	Doping^{†}
	Yekaterina Gordiyenko	Soviet Union	13.95 (w: -0.4 m/s)	14.64	1.79	6.17 (w: 0.5 m/s)	2:14.6	DQ	Doping^{‡}

^{†}: Nadiya Tkachenko ranked initially 1st (4744pts), but was disqualified for infringement of IAAF doping rules.
^{‡}: Yekaterina Gordiyenko ranked initially 5th (4572pts), but was disqualified for infringement of IAAF doping rules.

== Participation ==
According to an unofficial count, 21 athletes from 13 countries participated in the event.

- Czechoslovakia (1)
- East Germany (3)
- France (1)
- Hungary (1)
- Netherlands (2)
- Poland (1)
- Romania (1)
- Soviet Union (3)
- Sweden (1)
- Switzerland (1)
- Great Britain (2)
- West Germany (3)
- Yugoslavia (1)
