= Hartmut Schwabe =

German sprinter

Personal information
- Nationality: German
- Born: 1 December 1943 (age 82) Strelno, Germany

Sport
- Sport: Sprinting
- Event: 4 × 400 metres relay

Hartmut Schwabe (born 1 December 1943) is a German sprinter. He competed in the men's 4 × 400 metres relay at the 1968 Summer Olympics representing East Germany.
