= Birgitta Larsson-Tollan =

Swedish radio personality and athlete (born 1950)

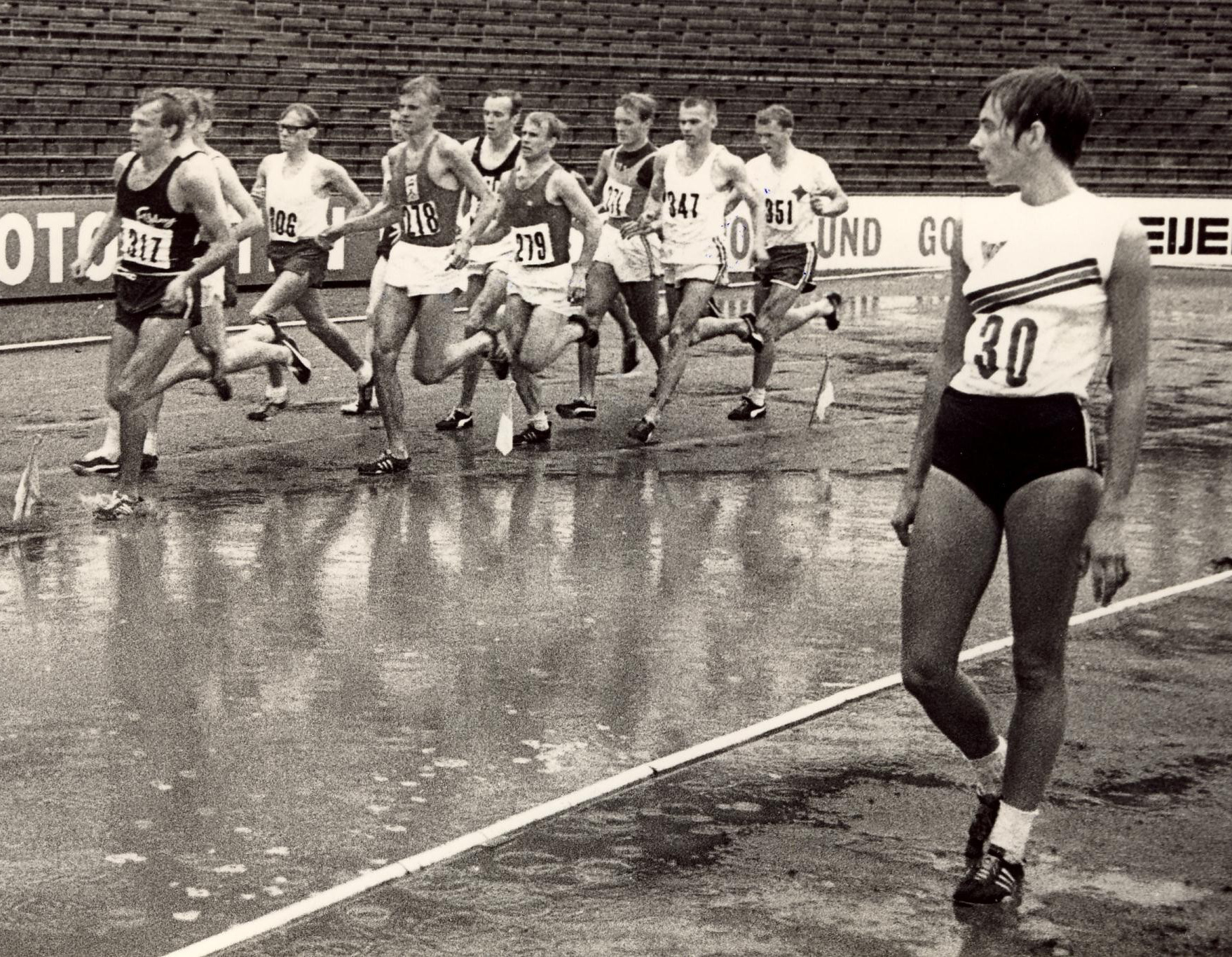
- Larsson-Tollan at the 1968 national championships

Personal information
- Born: 5 June 1950 (age 76)

Sport
- Sport: Athletics
- Event(s): Long jump, sprint

Achievements and titles
- Personal best(s): LJ – 6.28 m 400 m – 55.0; 800 m – 2:07.9

Birgitta Larsson-Tollan (née Larsson on 5 June 1950) is a Swedish radio personality and retired athlete. She had her best achievements in the long jump, winning the national title in 1969–71 and finishing 11th at the 1971 European Championships.

Since 1974 Larsson-Tollan works as a journalist and producer of topical programs on the Swedish radio, for which she received several awards from Swedish music and media associations. As of 2011 she lived in Copenhagen, Denmark.
