= Christine Laser =

East German pentathlete

Personal information
- Born: Christine Bodner; 19 March 1951 (age 75) Mattstedt, Thüringen, East Germany
- Height: 179 cm (5 ft 10 in)
- Weight: 68 kg (150 lb)
Medal record
Women's athletics
Representing East Germany
Olympic Games
Silver medal – second place	1976 Montreal	Pentathlon

Christine Laser (née Bodner, born 19 March 1951) is a former German athlete who mainly competed in the pentathlon.

== Biography ==
Christine Bodner was born in Mattstedt, near Apolda, Thüringen. She competed for East Germany at the 1976 Summer Olympics held in Montreal, Quebec, Canada where she won the silver medal in the pentathlon between team mates Siegrun Siegl and Burglinde Pollak for an East German clean sweep.

Bodner married the hurdler Jürgen Laser in 1974.
