= Helēna Ringa =

Latvian long jumper

Personal information
- Nationality: Latvian
- Born: 9 June 1947 (age 79) Riga, Latvian SSR, Soviet Union
- Height: 164 cm (5 ft 5 in)
- Weight: 57 kg (126 lb)

Sport
- Sport: Athletics
- Event: Long jump

Helēna Ringa (born 9 June 1947) is a Latvian athlete. She competed in the women's long jump at the 1968 Summer Olympics, representing the Soviet Union.
