= Lyubov Ilyina =

Soviet long jumper

Personal information
- Nationality: Soviet
- Born: 10 March 1950 (age 76)

Sport
- Sport: Athletics
- Event: Long jump

Lyubov Ilyina (born 10 March 1950) is a Soviet athlete. She competed in the women's long jump at the 1972 Summer Olympics.
