= Cathy Hamblin =

American pentathlete

Personal information
- Born: January 6, 1953; Pittsburg, California, United States
- Died: March 31, 2023 (aged 70); Albuquerque, New Mexico, United States

Sport
- Sport: Athletics
- Event: Pentathlon

Cathy Hamblin (born January 6, 1953) is an American athlete. She competed in the women's pentathlon at the 1968 Summer Olympics.
