= Mercedes Román =

Mexican sprinter (1945–2024)

Personal information
- Born: 26 September 1945 Mexico City, Mexico
- Died: 17 July 2024 (aged 78)
- Height: 1.74 m (5 ft 9 in)
- Weight: 60 kg (132 lb)

Sport
- Sport: Sprinting
- Event: Pentathlon
Medal record
Representing Mexico
Central American and Caribbean Games
| Silver medal – second place | 1974 Santo Domingo | 100m hurdles |
| Bronze medal – third place | 1970 Panama City | Pentathlon |
| Bronze medal – third place | 1970 Panama City | 4x100m relay |
| Bronze medal – third place | 1974 Santo Domingo | Pentathlon |
| Bronze medal – third place | 1974 Santo Domingo | 4x100m relay |

Mercedes Román Casillas (26 September 1945 – 17 July 2024) was a Mexican athlete who competed in the pentathlon and a number of individual events. She competed in the women's 4 × 100 metres relay, long jump, and pentathlon at the 1968 Summer Olympics. Román finished fourth in the 100 metres hurdles and sixth in the pentathlon at the 1971 Pan American Games. Román died on 17 July 2024, at the age of 78.

== International competitions ==
| Year | Competition | Venue | Position | Event | Notes |
Representing Mexico
| 1962 | Central American and Caribbean Games | Kingston, Jamaica | 11th (h) | 80 m hurdles | 13.3 |
| 1966 | Central American and Caribbean Games | San Juan, Puerto Rico | 6th | 80 m hurdles | 12.1 |
| 1966 | Central American and Caribbean Games | San Juan, Puerto Rico | – | High jump | NM |
| 1966 | Central American and Caribbean Games | San Juan, Puerto Rico | 6th | Long jump | 5.28 m |
| 1967 | Pan American Games | Winnipeg, Canada | – | 4 × 100 m relay | DQ |
| 1967 | Pan American Games | Winnipeg, Canada | 9th | Long jump | 5.47 m |
| 1967 | Central American and Caribbean Championships | Xalapa, Mexico | 3rd | 100 m | 12.4 |
| 1967 | Central American and Caribbean Championships | Xalapa, Mexico | 2nd | 4 × 100 m relay | 49.6 |
| 1967 | Central American and Caribbean Championships | Xalapa, Mexico | 3rd | Long jump | 5.39 m |
| 1967 | Central American and Caribbean Championships | Xalapa, Mexico | 2nd | Pentathlon | 4031 pts |
| 1968 | Olympic Games | Mexico City, Mexico | 12th (h) | 4 × 100 m relay | 47.0 |
| 1968 | Olympic Games | Mexico City, Mexico | 20th (q) | Long jump | 5.75 m |
| 1968 | Olympic Games | Mexico City, Mexico | 31st | Pentathlon | 3604 pts |
| 1970 | Central American and Caribbean Games | Panama City, Panama | 5th | 100 m hurdles | 15.1 |
| 1970 | Central American and Caribbean Games | Panama City, Panama | 3rd | 4 × 100 m relay | 48.1 |
| 1970 | Central American and Caribbean Games | Panama City, Panama | 4th | Long jump | 5.81 m |
| 1970 | Central American and Caribbean Games | Panama City, Panama | 3rd | Pentathlon | 4243 pts |
| 1971 | Central American and Caribbean Championships | Kingston, Jamaica | 5th | Long jump | 5.36 m |
| 1971 | Pan American Games | Cali, Colombia | 4th | 100 m hurdles | 14.43 |
| 1971 | Pan American Games | Cali, Colombia | 6th | Pentathlon | 3758 pts |
| 1973 | Central American and Caribbean Championships | Maracaibo, Venezuela | 3rd | 100 m hurdles | 14.4 |
| 1973 | Central American and Caribbean Championships | Maracaibo, Venezuela | 3rd | 4 × 400 m relay | 3:56.9 |
| 1973 | Central American and Caribbean Championships | Maracaibo, Venezuela | 2nd | Pentathlon | 3729 pts |
| 1973 | Universiade | Moscow, Soviet Union | 15th (h) | 100 m hurdles | 15.0 |
| 1973 | Universiade | Moscow, Soviet Union | 10th | Pentathlon | 3487 pts |
| 1974 | Central American and Caribbean Games | Santo Domingo, Dominican Republic | 2nd | 100 m hurdles | 14.69 |
| 1974 | Central American and Caribbean Games | Santo Domingo, Dominican Republic | 3rd | 4 × 100 m relay | 48.02 |
| 1974 | Central American and Caribbean Games | Santo Domingo, Dominican Republic | 3rd | Pentathlon | 3827 pts |
| 1975 | Central American and Caribbean Championships | Ponce, Puerto Rico | 2nd | 200 m hurdles | 30.0 |
| 1975 | Central American and Caribbean Championships | Ponce, Puerto Rico | 3rd | Pentathlon | 3619 pts |
| 1975 | Pan American Games | Mexico City, Mexico | 10th | Pentathlon | 3639 pts |

== Personal bests ==
- 100 metres – 12.0 (1968)
- Long jump – 5.94 (1968)
- Pentathlon – 4290 (1968)
