= Zoya Spasovkhodskaya =

Soviet heptathlete

Personal information
- Born: 31 March 1949 (age 77)

Sport
- Sport: Track and field
Medal record
Representing Soviet Union
European Championships
Bronze medal – third place	1974 Rome	Pentathlon

Zoya Spasovkhodskaya (born 31 March 1949) is a former heptathlete from the Soviet Union, who was born as Zoya Baykalova. A winner of the bronze medal at the 1974 European Championships, she set the first world best year performance in 1980, gaining a total number of 6049 points on 13 July 1980 at a meet in Pyatigorsk.

Sporting positions
Preceded by Incumbent	Women's Heptathlon Best Year Performance; 1980	Succeeded by (East Germany) Ramona Neubert
