= Shirley Clelland =

British pentathlete

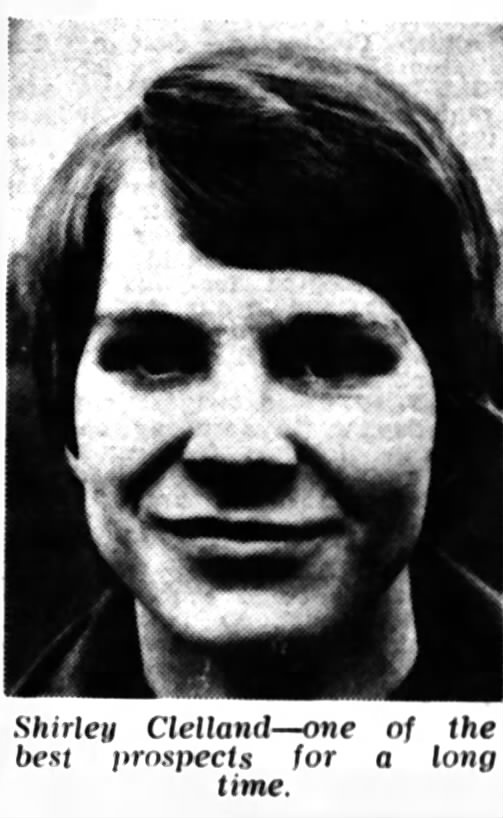

Personal information
- Nationality: British (English)
- Born: 24 February 1951 (age 74) Harrow, England

Sport
- Sport: Athletics
- Event: Pentathlon
- Club: Leicester Colleges; Stretford AC; Leicester Coritanian AC

Shirley Anne Clelland (born 24 February 1951) is a former combined events athlete who competed for England. She won the pentathlon silver medal at the 1969 Women's Amateur Athletic Association Championships and recorded three top-7 finishes at the 1970 Commonwealth Games and World University Games.

== Biography ==
Clelland was born an only child on 24 February 1951 in Kenton, London. Her father Ken Clelland was also her regional athletics coach, though she was later trained by Amateur Athletic Association of England coach Roger Beevers. She lived in Loughborough, Leicestershire, England and was described as having a quiet personality.

Clelland studied physical education at Dartford College. Her long jump role model was Mary Rand.

After her career as an athlete, Clelland became a schoolteacher. In 1974, she was appointed as the team manager for the Leicestershire and Rutland AAA athletics team, leading the team to moderate success.

== Athletics career ==
As a youth athlete, Clelland was considered one of the greatest ever all-around athletes from Leicestershire in "many a long year". She initially began as a sprinter but found success in the long jump. She competed at international meetings in Ireland, France, and White City, London, and won a gold medal at the 1969 All England School's Championships, jumping 19 ft 4 1/2 in (5.9 m). She would later post a best of 20 ft 2 1/4 in (6.15 m) in the long jump.

She later specialized in the women's pentathlon and was a member of the Leicester Coritanian Athletics Club. Clelland set a long jump record at the Leicestershire County Championships that would last over 10 years, jumping farther than 5.80 m. At the 1969 and 1970 Midlands Women's Amateur Athletic Association Championships (WAAA), Clelland won the pentathlon silver medal, only finishing behind Olympian Sue Scott in 1970.

Clelland earned her cap to represent England in the pentathlon at the 1970 British Commonwealth Games by beating out Susan Haywood for the third team berth. With a personal best of 4460 points, her selection made her the first woman from Loughborough to ever represent her country internationally in athletics.

With a final score of 4458 points, she finished 7th overall. Clelland also finished 7th in the pentathlon at the 1970 World University Games, scoring 4,451 points. She also participated on the British 4 × 100 m relay team there, finishing 6th.

At the end of 1970, Clelland sustained a serious injury at the site of the World University Games in Turin, Italy. The injury prevented her from competing in pentathlons for two years. In September 1972, she returned to win 3 individual events at the final Midland Women's Division league match, and soon after she posted a 3,441-point pentathlon score.
