= Kristina Albertus =

German long jumper

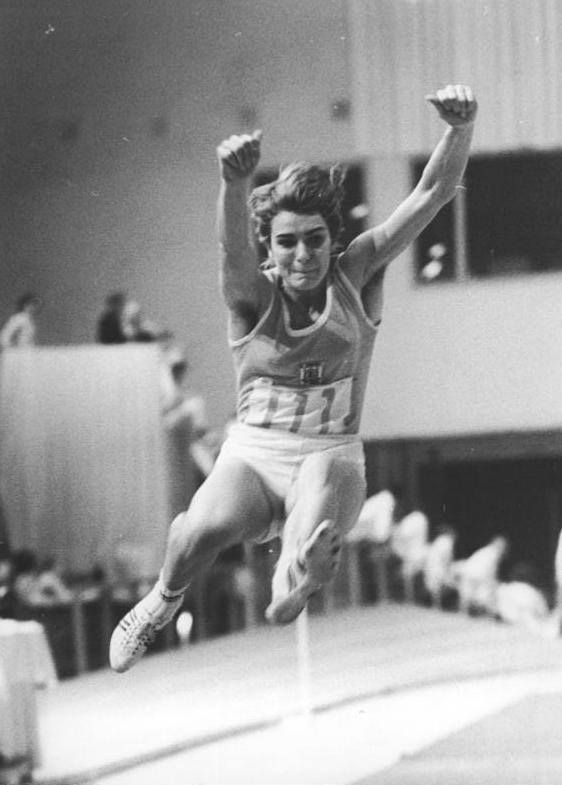
- Albertus in 1972

Personal information
- Nationality: German
- Born: 14 October 1945 (age 80) Radebeul, Soviet occupation zone of Germany

Sport
- Sport: Athletics
- Event: Long jump

Kristina Hauer-Albertus (born 14 October 1945 in Radebeul) is a German athlete. She competed in the women's long jump at the 1972 Summer Olympics.
