= Athletics at the 1971 Pan American Games – Women's 100 metres hurdles =

Women's 100 metres hurdles at the Pan American Games

The women's 100 metres hurdles event at the 1971 Pan American Games was held in Cali on 31 July and 1 August. It was the first time this distance was held at the Games replacing the 80 metres hurdles.

== Medalists ==
Gold	Silver	Bronze
Patty Johnson; United States	Marlene Elejarde; Cuba	Penny May; Canada

== Results ==
=== Heats ===
Wind:
Heat 1: 0.0 m/s, Heat 2: +2.4 m/s

Rank	Heat	Name	Nationality	Time	Notes
1	1	Patty Johnson	United States	13.46	Q
2	1	Lourdes Jones	Cuba	13.61	Q
3	1	Penny May	Canada	13.62	Q
4	2	Marlene Elejarde	Cuba	13.70	Q
5	1	Mercedes Román	Mexico	14.29	Q
6	1	Emilia Dyrzka	Argentina	14.52	
7	2	Jenny Meldrum	Canada	14.53	Q
8	2	Edith Noeding	Peru	14.77	Q
9	2	Amaya Barturen	Chile	15.13	Q
10	2	Mayra Figueroa	Guatemala	18.05	
	2	Pat Donnelly	United States	DQ	
	1	Lucía Vaamonde	Venezuela	DNS	
	2	Aída dos Santos	Brazil	DNS	

=== Final ===
Wind: +4.4 m/s

Rank	Name	Nationality	Time	Notes
1st place, gold medalist(s)	Patty Johnson	United States	13.19	
2nd place, silver medalist(s)	Marlene Elejarde	Cuba	13.54	
3rd place, bronze medalist(s)	Penny May	Canada	13.70	
4	Mercedes Román	Mexico	14.43	
5	Edith Noeding	Peru	14.70	
6	Jenny Meldrum	Canada	14.73	
7	Amaya Barturen	Chile	15.38	
	Lourdes Jones	Cuba	DNF	
