= Leicester Coritanian Athletics Club =

British athletics club

Leicester Coritanian AC
- Founded: 1969
- Ground: Saffron Lane sports centre
- Location: Saffron Lane, Leicester LE2 7NQ, England
- Coordinates: 52°36′49″N 1°08′02″W
- Website: official website

Leicester Coritanian Athletics Club is an athletics club based in Leicester, England. It is based at the Saffron Lane sports centre. The club competes at all levels in senior and junior road racing, cross country, and track and field.

The name is derived from the Celtic tribe the Corieltauvi who inhabited Leicester and the surrounding area in the Iron Age.

== History ==
The club was founded in 1969 at the same time that the Saffron Lane sports centre opened.

== Notable athletes ==
=== Olympians ===
- Diana Elliott-Davies (1984, 1988)
- Maxine Newman (1992)
- Lisa York (1992)

=== Commonwealth Games ===
- Shirley Clelland (1970)
- Chris Monk (1974)
- Laura Samuel (2014)

=== National senior champions ===
- Brenda Gibbs-Flowers (1977)
- Eden Francis (7 times)
