= Kim Attlesey =

American long jumper (born 1953)

Personal information
- Born: June 26, 1953 (age 73) Los Angeles, California, U.S.

Sport
- Sport: Athletics
- Event: Long jump

Kim Attlesey (born June 26, 1953) is an American athlete. She competed in the women's long jump at the 1972 Summer Olympics.
