= Burghild Wieczorek =

German long jumper

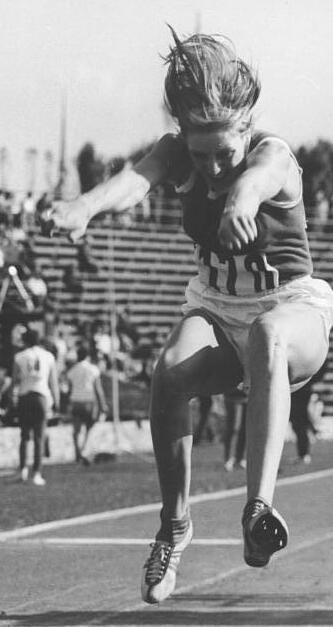
- Wieczorek in 1967

Personal information
- Nationality: German
- Born: 4 May 1943 Dessau, Dessau-Roßlau, Germany
- Died: 28 November 2016 (aged 73) Jena, Thüringen, Germany
- Height: 174 cm (5 ft 9 in)
- Weight: 65 kg (143 lb)

Sport
- Sport: Athletics
- Event: Long jump
- Club: SC DHfK, Leipzig

Burghild Wieczorek (4 May 1943 – 28 November 2016) was a German athlete who competed in the at the 1968 Summer Olympics.

== Biography ==
Wieczorek finished second behind Berit Berthelsen in the long jump event at the 1967 WAAA Championships.

At the 1968 Olympic Games in Mexico City, she represented East Germany in the women's long jump event
