= Angelika Liebsch =

German long jumper

Personal information
- Nationality: German
- Born: 19 April 1950 (age 76)

Sport
- Sport: Athletics
- Event: Long jump

Angelika Liebsch (born 19 April 1950) is a German athlete. She competed in the women's long jump at the 1972 Summer Olympics.
