= Gerda Uhlemann =

German pentathlete

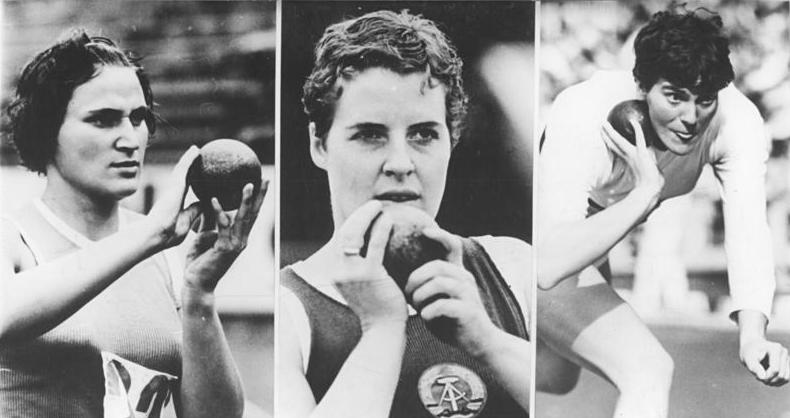
- Gerda Uhmann, Margitta Gummel, Marita Lange (left to right)

Personal information
- Nationality: German
- Born: 22 February 1945 (age 80); Königstein im Taunus, West Germany

Sport
- Sport: Athletics
- Event: Pentathlon

Gerda Uhlemann (née Mittenzwei; born 22 February 1945) is a German former athlete. She competed in the women's pentathlon at the 1968 Summer Olympics.
