= Odette Ducas =

French athletics competitor

Odette Delcellier (married name Ducas, born 4 November 1940 in Chevrainvilliers), is a former French athlete in track and field. At 1.73m in height and weighing 63 kg, she was a specialist in the long jump and also competed at the Summer Olympic Games in the pentathlon.

== Career ==
She competed for ASPTT Lille until 1973; in addition to the long jump, in modern pentathlon and sprinting.

She represented France in the 1972 Olympics, in the long jump (20th place) and the pentathlon (23rd place).

== Achievements ==
- 27 International French Team caps for France Athletics, from 1957 to 1973
- Record holder in France in 1968, 1970, and 1971 with a jump of 6.49 m.
- France record holder in the pentathlon in 1968 and 1971
- (gold) European Indoor Relay Champion 4 × 1 relay in 1969
- (gold) France champion in long jump 1962 and from 1968 to 1973
- (silver) silver medal in the 4 × 100 m relay at the Mediterranean Games in 1971
- 4th place in the 80 m hurdles at the Mediterranean Games in 1971

== Sources ==
- Fédération Française d'Athlétisme (2003), Docathlé 2003, Fédération française d'athlétisme, pp. 42, 44–45, 117, 175, 399, ISBN 2-9512343-3-3
- EAA (1996), European Athletics Yearbook 1995–1996, p. 146, ISBN 3-87390-115-3
