= Karen Mack (athlete) =

German pentathlete

Personal information
- Nationality: German
- Born: 9 October 1947 (age 79) Oberstdorf, West Germany

Sport
- Sport: Athletics
- Event: Pentathlon

Karen Mack (born 9 October 1947) is a German athlete. She competed in the women's pentathlon at the 1972 Summer Olympics.
