= Galina Sofina =

Personal information
- Nationality: Soviet
- Born: 7 March 1942 (age 83); Kazan, Soviet Union

Sport
- Sport: Athletics
- Event: Pentathlon

Galina Sofina (born 7 March 1942) is a Soviet athlete. She competed in the women's pentathlon at the 1968 Summer Olympics.
