= Barbara-Anne Barrett =

British long jumper

Personal information
- Nationality: British (English)
- Born: 4 October 1951 (age 74) Surrey

Sport
- Sport: Athletics
- Event: Long jump
- Club: Mitcham AC

Barbara-Anne Barrett married name Barbara-Anne Clark (born 4 October 1951), is a female former athlete who competed for England.

== Biography ==
Barrett finished third behind Sheila Sherwood in the long jump event at the 1969 WAAA Championships. Barrett represented England in the long jump, at the 1970 British Commonwealth Games in Edinburgh, Scotland.

In 1971, Barrett competed at the 1971 European Athletics Championships in Helsinki and finished second behind Sheila Sherwood at the 1971 WAAA Championships.

In 1973 she became the English indoor champion.
