= Inge Bauer =

East German pentathlete

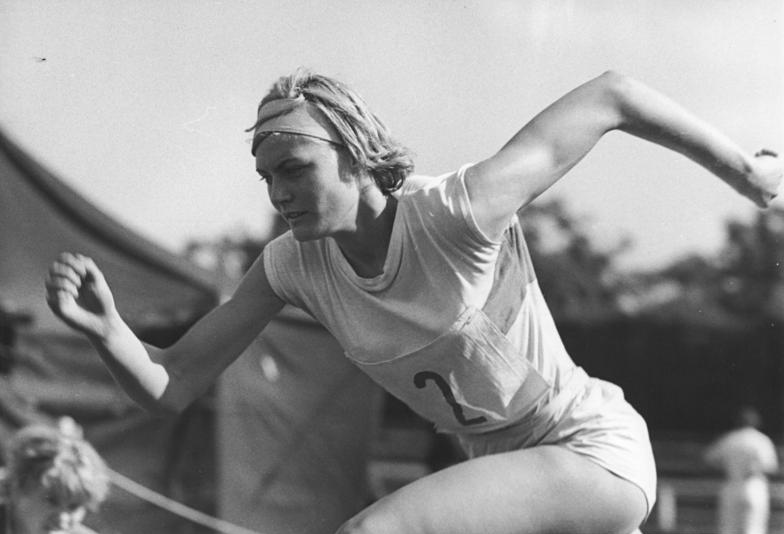

Medal record

Women's athletics

Representing East Germany

European Championships
Bronze medal – third place	1966 Budapest	Pentathlon

Ingeborg "Inge" Bauer (née Exner; born 24 June 1940 in Dittmannsdorf) is a retired East German pentathlete.

She won the bronze medal at the 1966 European Championships with 4713 points and finished seventh at the 1968 Summer Olympics with 4849 points.

She competed for the athletics team SC Motor Jena during her active career.
