= Kathrin Lardi =

Swiss pentathlete

Personal information
- Nationality: Swiss
- Born: 28 December 1942 (age 82)

Sport
- Sport: Athletics
- Event: Pentathlon

Kathrin Lardi (born 28 December 1942) is a Swiss athlete. She competed in the women's pentathlon at the 1972 Summer Olympics.
