= Lyudmila Popovskaya =

Soviet athlete

Personal information
- Nationality: Soviet
- Born: 17 December 1950 (age 75) Ivanovo, Soviet Union

Sport
- Sport: Athletics
- Event: Pentathlon

Lyudmila Nikolayevna Popovskaya (née Skolobanova; born 17 December 1950) is a Soviet athlete. She competed in the women's pentathlon at the 1976 Summer Olympics.
