= Monique Bantégny =

French pentathlete

Personal information
- Nationality: French
- Born: 11 February 1940 (age 85); Arras, France

Sport
- Sport: Athletics
- Event: Pentathlon

Monique Bantégny (born 11 February 1940) is a French athlete. She competed in the women's pentathlon at the 1968 Summer Olympics.
