= Margaret Murphy (Olympian) =

Irish hurdler

Personal information
- Nationality: Irish
- Born: 21 September 1944 (age 81) cork

Sport
- Sport: Track and field
- Event(s): Pentathlon- long jump, high jump, 100m hurdles, 200m & shot
- Club: Ovens AC

Margaret Murphy (born 21 September 1944) is an Irish hurdler. She competed in the 1972 Summer Olympics – 100m Hurdles & Pentathlon at the 1972 Summer Olympics.
