= Debbie Van Kiekebelt =

Canadian athlete and sports broadcaster (born 1954)

Personal information
- Born: March 1, 1954 (age 72) Kitchener, Ontario
Medal record
Women's athletics
Representing Canada
Pan American Games
| Gold medal – first place | 1971 Cali | Pentathlon |
Pacific Conference Games
| Silver medal – second place | 1973 Toronto | High jump |

Deborah "Debbie" Van Kiekebelt (born March 1, 1954, in Kitchener, Ontario) is a Canadian athlete and sports broadcaster. She was a gold medallist in the pentathlon at the 1971 Pan American Games, and was named that year's Canadian Woman Athlete of the year. Later, she became Canada's first female sports broadcaster.

Van Kiekebelt attended Clarkson Secondary School in Mississauga, Ontario. During her high school days at Clarkson, she not only captured many Peel regional titles, but set records in several events.

Van Kiekebelt finished second behind fellow Canadian Debbie Brill in the high jump event at the British 1971 WAAA Championships.

After her Pan-Am gold medal win in Cali, Colombia, in the pentathlon, She competed in the Long Jump and Pentathlon at the 1972 Olympic games in Munich. Where she failed to advance to final in the long jump, and place 15th in the Pentathlon. She won a silver medal in the high jump at the 1973 Pacific Conference Games; she was appointed to the Mississauga Sports Hall of Fame in 1977. She became the first female Canadian sports broadcaster, appearing on Citytv and NBC, and was host of six television series.

Van Kiekebelt was a director for the See You In Athens Fund which supported Canadian athletes attending the 2004 Summer Olympics.
