= Monika Peikert =

German pentathlete

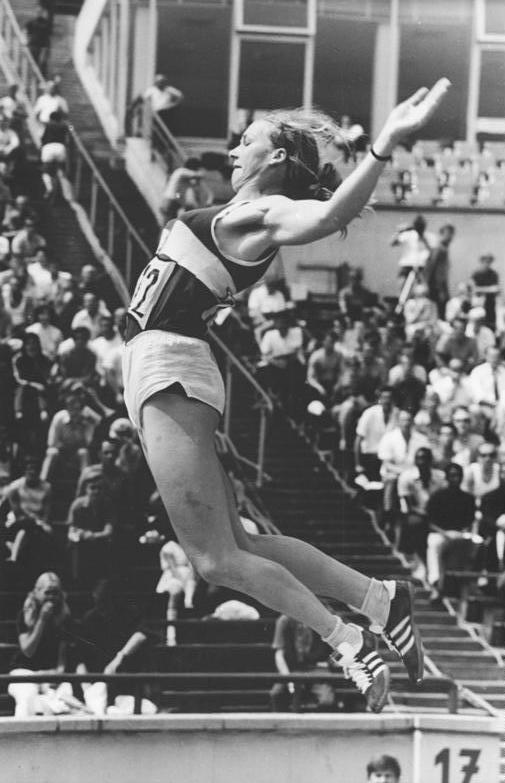
- Monika Peikert in 1971

Personal information
- Nationality: German
- Born: 26 March 1952 (age 73); Forst, East Germany

Sport
- Sport: Athletics
- Event: Pentathlon

Monika Peikert (born 26 March 1952) is a German athlete. She competed in the women's pentathlon at the 1972 Summer Olympics.
