= Maureen Chitty =

British long jumper

Maureen Chitty née Barton
Personal information
- Nationality: British (English)
- Born: 14 December 1947 (age 78) Kingston upon Thames, England
- Height: 170 cm (5 ft 7 in)
- Weight: 61 kg (134 lb)

Sport
- Sport: Athletics
- Event: long jump
- Club: Surrey AC

Maureen Anne Chitty (née Barton; born 14 December 1947) is a female British former long jumper who competed at the two Olympic Games.

== Biography ==
Born in Kingston upon Thames, Barton finished second behind Sheila Sherwood in the long jump event at the 1968 WAAA Championships.

Later that year at the 1968 Olympic Games in Mexico City, she represented Great Britain and reached the long jump final.

Barton married in the second half of 1970 and competed under her married name of Chitty thereafter.

Chitty finished second behind Sheila Sherwood again at the 1972 WAAA Championships. and then at the 1972 Olympics Games in Munich, she represented Great Britain again where she was placed 16th.

Her best jump was recorded at 6.29 m (20 ft 7 1/2 in) in 1972.

She represented England in the long jump event, at the 1974 British Commonwealth Games in Christchurch, New Zealand.
