= Hiroko Yamashita (athlete) =

Japanese long jumper (born 1951)

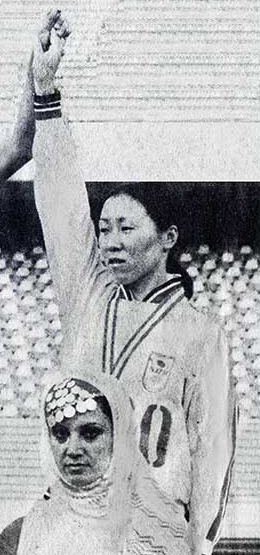
- Yamashita at the 1974 Asian Games

Personal information
- Born: July 29, 1951 (age 74)
- Height: 161 cm (5 ft 3 in)
- Weight: 53 kg (117 lb)

Sport
- Sport: Athletics
- Event: Long jump

Achievements and titles
- Personal best: 6.41 m (1972)
Medal record
Representing Japan
Asian Games
Gold medal – first place	1970 Bangkok	Long jump
Bronze medal – third place	1974 Tehran	Long jump
Summer Universiade
Bronze medal – third place	1970 Turin	Long jump

Hiroko Yamashita (山下 博子, Yamashita Hiroko; born July 29, 1951) is a retired Japanese long jumper. She won a gold and a bronze medal at the Asian Games in 1970 and 1974, respectively, and placed 15th at the 1972 Summer Olympics.
