= Margot Eppinger =

German pentathlete (1952–2026)

Personal information
- Full name: Margot Cäcilie Eppinger
- Nationality: German
- Born: 8 January 1952 Denkendorf, Württemberg-Baden, West Germany
- Died: 2 August 2026 (aged 74)

Sport
- Sport: Athletics
- Event: Pentathlon

Margot Cäcilie Eppinger (8 January 1952 – 2 August 2026) was a German athlete. She competed in the women's pentathlon at the 1972 Summer Olympics and the 1976 Summer Olympics. Eppinger died on 2 August 2026, at the age of 74.
