= Gale Fitzgerald =

American pentathlete, sprinter, and hurdler

Personal information
- Born: June 9, 1951 (age 75) Newark, New Jersey, country

Sport
- Sport: Track and field
Medal record
Representing United States
Pan American Games
| Silver medal – second place | 1975 Mexico City | Pentathlon |

Gale Lillian Fitzgerald (born June 9, 1951) is a former American athlete who competed in two Olympic pentathlons, winning silver medal in 1975 at the Pan American Games. In 1970, she was AIAW champion in the 440 yards. She ran on four world-record setting 4×440 yard relay teams in 1970–71. Fitzgerald attended Montclair State University where she earned a master's degree. During this time, she trained for the 1976 Summer Olympics.

Fitzgerald was a resident of East Orange, New Jersey.

After retiring from athletics, she sold life insurance before becoming an investment banker before investing in her own companies. Working for Film Star Releasing, she formed Global Media, attracting over $500 million in pre-paid advertising credits. Fitzgerald was also movie producer and served as President of Sunset Hill Productions.

== Personal bests ==
- 100y – 11.1 (1968)
- 200 – 24.0 (1972)
- 400 – 54.4 (1968)
- 800 – 2:12.1 (1971)
- 100H – 13.9 (1976)
- 400H – 1:01.01 (1973)
- HJ – 5-8¼i [1.73] (1975)
- LJ – 20-2¾ [6.16] (1976)
- SP – 44-10¼ [13.67] (1975)
- Pen – 4566 (1975)
