= Nadiya Tkachenko =

Ukrainian Soviet athlete

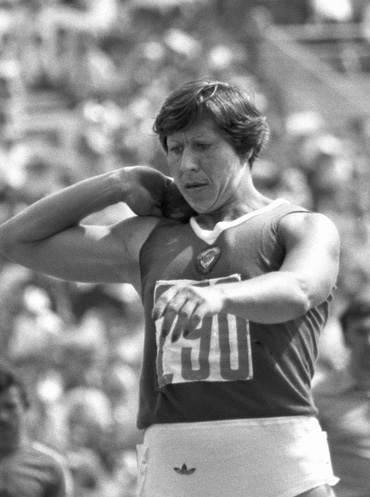
- Tkachenko at the Moscow Olympics, 1980

Medal record

Women's athletics

Representing the Soviet Union

Olympic Games
Gold medal – first place	1980 Moscow	Pentathlon

European Championships
Gold medal – first place	1974 Rome	Pentathlon

Universiade
Gold medal – first place	1973 Moscow	Pentathlon

Nadiya Volodymyrivna Tkachenko (Ukrainian: Надія Володимирівна Ткаченко) or Nadezhda Vladimirovna Tkachenko (Russian: Надежда Владимировна Ткаченко) (born 19 September 1948) is a Ukrainian former pentathlete who won gold at the 1980 Olympics. She was born in Kremenchuk, then in the Ukrainian SSR in the Soviet Union, and took up pentathlon aged 18 training at the Vanguard Voluntary Sports Societies of the Soviet Union in Donetsk Oblast. She came second in pentathlon in the Soviet championships of 1971 and 1972, and competed three times for the Soviet Union at the Olympics.

She set her first world record (4839 points) winning the 1977 European Cup. She won the 1974 European title, but was stripped of the 1978 title after testing positive for anabolic steroids and given an 18-month ban. In May 1980, just after the ban, she scored 4880 points, which was not ratified as a record because the races were hand timed. In July she won the 1980 Olympic title with 5083 points, becoming the only woman ever to break 5000 points outdoors, (Note: Strictly, the only woman to break 5000 points using the 1971 scoring tables, under which Burglinde Pollak's 1970 record score of 5406 was reduced to 4775. The indoor record of 5013 points was set in 2012 with the 1985 tables.) with the final world record before the event was replaced in 1981 by the heptathlon. The Soviet government awarded her the Order of the Red Banner of Labour and the title Honored Master of Sports of the USSR.

Since retiring from competition she has worked as a youth sports coach in Donetsk, of which she was named an honorary citizen in 2005. A youth athletics competition in the city is named after her.
