= Lin Chun-yu =

Taiwanese long jumper (born 1950)

Personal information
- Full name: 林 純玉, Pinyin: Lín Chún-yù
- Nationality: Taiwanese
- Born: 20 February 1950 (age 76)

Sport
- Sport: Athletics
- Event: Long jump
Medal record
Women's athletics
Representing Taiwan
Asian Championships
Gold medal – first place	1973 Marikina	Pentathlon
Bronze medal – third place	1973 Marikina	4×400 m

Lin Chun-yu (born 20 February 1950) is a Taiwanese athlete. She competed in the women's long jump at the 1968 Summer Olympics and the 1972 Summer Olympics.
