= Margit Papp =

Hungarian athlete

Medal record

Women's athletics

Representing Hungary

European Championships
Gold medal – first place	1978 Prague	Pentathlon

Margit Papp (born 30 April 1948) is a Hungarian former athlete. She competed in the Summer Olympic Games in 1972, 1976 and 1980 and won the gold medal in women's pentathlon at the 1978 European Championships.

== Career ==
Papp first competed in the European Championships in Budapest 1966 as an 18-year-old, placing 18th in the pentathlon. She made her Olympic debut in Munich in 1972, finishing 23rd with 4074 points. Four years later in Montréal she scored 4535 points and placed 8th.

At the 1978 European Championships in Prague Papp scored 4655 points and won the gold medal. She originally placed second behind the defending champion, Nadiya Tkachenko of the Soviet Union, but moved up when Tkachenko was disqualified for doping. Papp made a final Olympic appearance in 1980, placing fifth with 4562 points. In the 1978 European Championships and the 1980 Olympics she also competed in the long jump, failing to qualify for the final on either occasion.
