= Margrit Olfert =

East German athlete

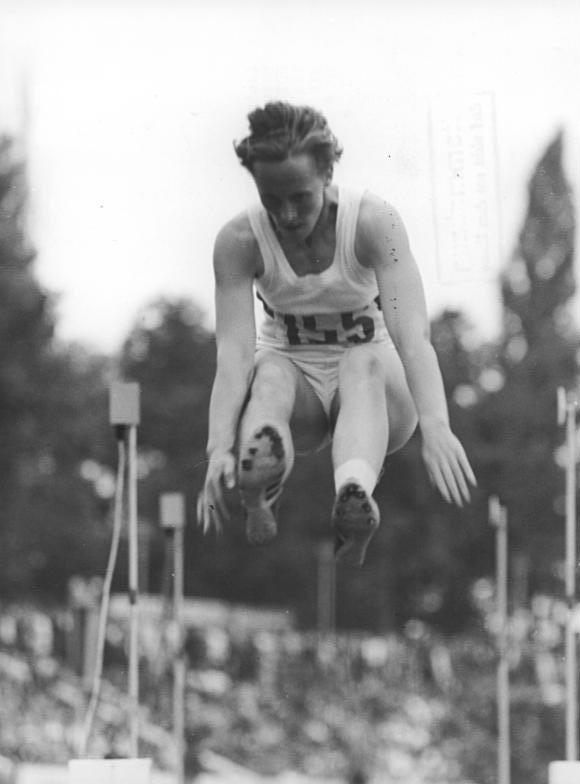

Personal information
- Born: 10 February 1947 (age 79) Magdeburg, East Germany

Sport
- Sport: Track and field
Medal record
Representing East Germany
European Championships
Bronze medal – third place	1971 Helsinki	Pentathlon
Summer Universiade
Gold medal – first place	1973 Moscow	Long jump

Margrit Olfert, née Herbst (born 10 February 1947) is a retired East German athlete who specialized in the long jump and pentathlete.

She competed for the sports club SC Magdeburg during her active career.

== Achievements ==
Year	Tournament	Venue	Result	Extra
1971	European Championships	Helsinki, Finland	3rd	Pentathlon
1971	European Championships	Helsinki, Finland	9th	Long jump
1972	Olympic Games	Munich, West Germany	8th	Long jump
1974	European Championships	Rome, Italy	7th	Pentathlon
