= Heide Rosendahl =

German pentathlete

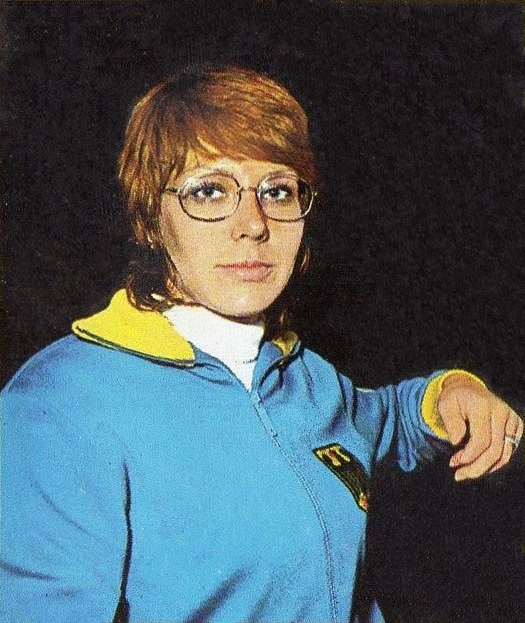
- Rosendahl c. 1972

Personal information
- Born: 14 February 1947 (age 79) Hückeswagen, North Rhine-Westphalia, Allied-occupied Germany
- Height: 1.74 m (5 ft 9 in)
- Weight: 69 kg (152 lb)

Sport
- Sport: Athletics
- Event: Pentathlon
- Club: Bayer Leverkusen

Achievements and titles
- Personal bests: 100 m – 11.3 (1971); 200 m – 22.96 (1972); 100 mH – 13.1 (1970); LJ – 6.84 m (1970); Pentathlon – 4791 (1972)
Medal record
Women's athletics
Representing West Germany
Olympic Games
Gold medal – first place	1972 Munich	Long jump
Gold medal – first place	1972 Munich	4 × 100 metre relay
Silver medal – second place	1972 Munich	Pentathlon
European Championships
Gold medal – first place	1971 Helsinki	Pentathlon
Silver medal – second place	1966 Budapest	Pentathlon
Bronze medal – third place	1971 Helsinki	Long jump
European Indoor Championships
Gold medal – first place	1971 Sofia	Long jump
Silver medal – second place	1970 Vienna	Long jump
Summer Universiade
Gold medal – first place	1970 Turin	Long jump
Bronze medal – third place	1970 Turin	4x100 metre relay

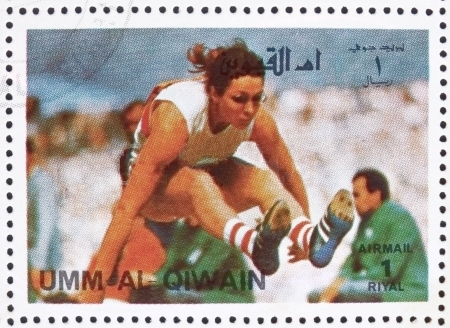
Rosendahl on a 1972 stamp of Umm al-Quwain

Heidemarie Ecker-Rosendahl (German pronunciation: [ˈhaɪdə ˈʔɛkɐ ˈʁoːzn̩ˌdaːl]; née Rosendahl; born 14 February 1947) is a retired German athlete who competed mainly in the pentathlon and long jump. On 3 September 1970, at the 1970 Summer Universiade in Turin, she set a world record in the long jump at 6.84 m that stood for almost six years.

== Biography ==
She won the long jump gold medal in the 1972 Summer Olympics with a leap of 6.78 m, one centimetre ahead of Diana Yorgova of Bulgaria. Two days later in a thrilling pentathlon, she finished second to Mary Peters of Great Britain.

After the three events on the first day Rosendahl was in the fifth place, 301 points behind Peters. On the second day, she jumped 6.83 m in the long jump (one cm short of the record) and ran the 200 m in 22.96 seconds. She finished with 4791 points, 16 points better than Burglinde Pollak's world record. She would have set a new world mark had not Peters finished the 200 m in 24.08 to better Rosendahl by a slender 10 points. To further prove her versatility, Rosendahl helped the West German 4 × 100 m team with Christiane Krause, Ingrid Mickler-Becker and Annegret Richter to the gold medal and a world record.

In 1970 and 1972 Rosendahl was chosen as the German Sportswoman of the Year. She had a degree in physical education and worked as athletics coach at TSV Bayer 04 Leverkusen (1976–1990) and Deutsche Leichtathletik-Verband (1993–2001). She is married to John Ecker, an American basketball player who won the 1969, 1970 and 1971 NCAA Championships as a member of the UCLA Bruins. Their son, Danny Ecker, was a world-class pole vaulter. Rosendahl's father, Heinz Rosendahl, was the German champion in the discus throw in 1948, 1951 and 1953.

Awards
Preceded by (Germany) Liesel Westermann	German Sportswoman of the Year; 1970	Succeeded by (Germany) Ingrid Mickler-Becker
Preceded by (Germany) Ingrid Mickler-Becker	German Sportswoman of the Year; 1972	Succeeded by (Germany) Uta Schorn
