= Brenda Eisler =

Canadian long jumper (born 1951)

Personal information
- Born: October 16, 1951 (age 74) Calgary, Alberta, Canada
- Height: 170 cm (5 ft 7 in)
- Weight: 57 kg (126 lb)

Sport
- Sport: Athletics
- Event: long jump
- Club: North Vancouver
Medal record
Women's athletics
Representing Canada
Pacific Conference Games
Bronze medal – third place	1969 Tokyo	Long jump
Pan American Games
Gold medal – first place	1971 Cali	Long jump
Commonwealth Games
Silver medal – second place	1974 Christchurch	Long jump
Universiade
Bronze medal – third place	1973 Moscow	Long jump

Brenda Lee Eisler (born October 16, 1951) is a retired long jumper from Canada, who competed at the 1972 Summer Olympics.

== Biography ==
Eisler took home a bronze medal from the Pacific Conference Games in 1969. She won the gold medal at the 1971 Pan American Games.

Eisler finished third behind Sheila Sherwood in the long jump event at the British 1971 WAAA Championships.

Eisler competed for her native country at the 1972 Olympic Games in Munich, West Germany. In 1974 she won the silver medal in the long jump at the Commonwealth Games in Christchurch, New Zealand.
