= Elena Vintilă =

Romanian athlete

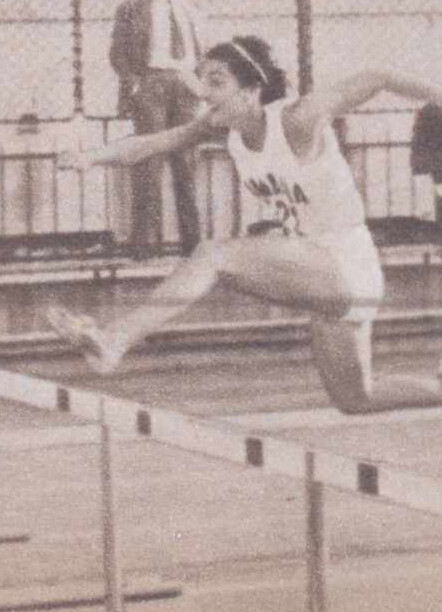

Personal information
- Nationality: Romanian
- Born: 27 January 1946 (age 80) Timișoara, Romania

Sport
- Sport: Athletics
- Event: Long jump
Medal record
Representing Romania
Summer Universiade
Silver medal – second place	1970 Turin	Long jump

Elena Vintilă (born 27 January 1946) is a Romanian athlete. She competed in the women's long jump at the 1972 Summer Olympics and the 1976 Summer Olympics.
