= Ann Wilson (athlete) =

English pentathlete (born 1949)

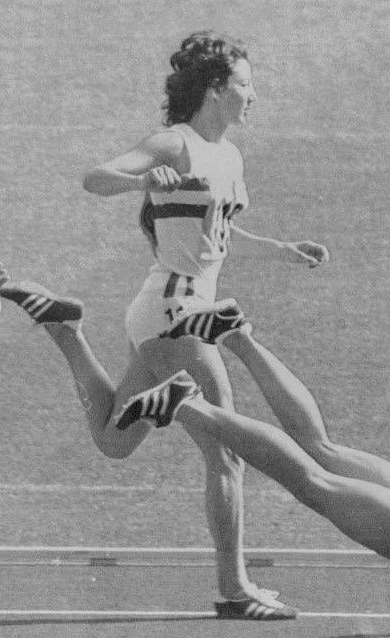
- Wilson at the 1972 Olympics

Personal information
- Nationality: British (English)
- Born: 29 September 1949 (age 76) Rochford, England
- Height: 168 cm (5 ft 6 in)
- Weight: 58 kg (128 lb)

Sport
- Sport: Athletics
- Events: Hurdles, long jump, pentathlon
- Club: Southend-on-Sea AC

Achievements and titles
- Personal bests: 80 mH – 10.8 (1967); 100 mH – 13.53 (1972); LJ – 6.56 m (1970)
Medal record
Representing England
British Commonwealth Games
Silver medal – second place	1970 Edinburgh	Pentathlon
Silver medal – second place	1970 Edinburgh	Long jump
Silver medal – second place	1970 Edinburgh	High jump
Bronze medal – third place	1974 Christchurch	Pentathlon
Representing Great Britain
European Cup
Silver medal – second place	1970 Budapest	Long jump

Ann Shirley Wilson (born 29 September 1949), married name Ann Simmonds is a retired English pentathlete who competed at two Olympic Games.

== Biography ==
Wilson represented the England team in the 80 metres hurdles, long jump and high jump, at the 1966 British Empire and Commonwealth Games in Kingston, Jamaica.

Wilson finished second behind Berit Berthelsen in the long jump event at the 1967 WAAA Championships.

After finishing third behind Sheila Sherwood at the 1968 WAAA Championships, she represented Great Britain at the 1968 Olympic Games in Mexico City, in the pentathlon, 80 metres hurdles and long jump events with the best result of 13th place in the long jump.

Wilson became the national long jump champion by virtue of being the highest placed British athlete in the long jump behind Ingrid Becker at the 1970 WAAA Championships. The following month she represented England at the 1970 British Commonwealth Games in Edinburgh, Scotland, winning three silver medals in the long jump, high jump and pentathlon.

At the 1972 Olympics Games in Munich, she represented Great Britain in the Women's pentathlon event and later won a bronze medal in the pentathlon at the 1974 British Commonwealth Games at Christchurch, New Zealand.

Wilson also won the WAAA pentathlon title at the 1972 WAAA Championships and 1974 WAAA Championships.

Wilson married in 1975 to become Simmonds.
