= Burglinde Pollak =

East German pentathlete

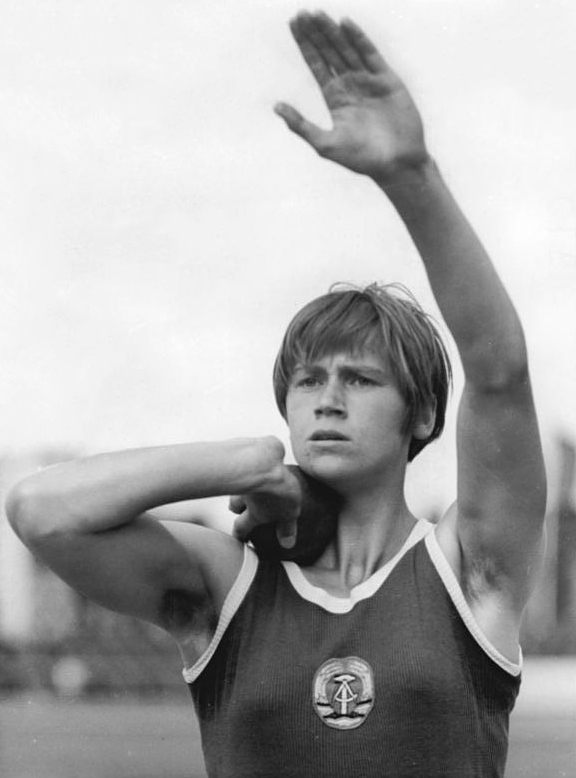
- Burglinde Pollak in 1970

Personal information
- Born: 10 June 1951 (age 75) Alt-Plötzin, East Germany
- Height: 1.79 m (5 ft 10 in)
- Weight: 78 kg (172 lb)

Sport
- Sport: Athletics
- Event: Pentathlon
- Club: ASK Vorwärts Potsdam

Achievements and titles
- Personal best(s): 4932 (1973); 4707 (1980)
Medal record
Women's athletics
Representing East Germany
Olympic Games
| Bronze medal – third place | 1972 Munich | Pentathlon |
| Bronze medal – third place | 1976 Montreal | Pentathlon |
European Championships
| Silver medal – second place | 1971 Helsinki | Pentathlon |
| Silver medal – second place | 1974 Rome | Pentathlon |
| Silver medal – second place | 1978 Prague | Pentathlon |

Burglinde Pollak (later Grimm, born 10 June 1951) is a retired German pentathlete. She won bronze medals at the 1972 and 1976 Olympics and finished sixth in 1980. At the European championships she won three silver medals, in 1971, 1974 and 1978. Pollak set three world records, in 1970, 1972 and 1973. After retiring from competitions she worked as a physiotherapist at her own clinic.
