= Nedyalka Angelova =

Bulgarian pentathlete

Personal information
- Nationality: Bulgarian
- Born: 26 June 1949 (age 77) Kyustendil, Bulgaria

Sport
- Sport: Athletics
- Event: Pentathlon
Medal record
Representing Bulgaria
Summer Universiade
Silver medal – second place	1970 Turin	Pentathlon

Nedyalka Boyanova Angelova (born 26 June 1949) is a Bulgarian athlete. She competed in the women's pentathlon at the 1972 Summer Olympics.
