= 1971 European Athletics Indoor Championships – Women's 60 metres hurdles =

The women's 60 metres hurdles event at the 1971 European Athletics Indoor Championships was held on 14 March in Sofia.

== Medalists ==
Gold	Silver	Bronze
Karin Balzer; East Germany	Anneliese Ehrhardt; East Germany	Teresa Sukniewicz; Poland

== Results ==
=== Heats ===
First 3 from each heat (Q) qualified directly for the semifinals.

Rank	Heat	Name	Nationality	Time	Notes
1	1	Karin Balzer	East Germany	8.2	Q, =WB
2	1	Meta Antenen	Switzerland	8.3	Q, NR
3	1	Danuta Straszyńska	Poland	8.4	Q
4	1	Miep van Beek	Netherlands	8.6	
5	1	Snezhana Yurukova	Bulgaria	8.8	
1	2	Valeria Bufanu	Romania	8.4	Q
2	2	Liudmila Ievleva	Soviet Union	8.6	Q
3	2	Manon Bornholdt	West Germany	8.7	Q
4	2	Gunhild Olsson	Sweden	8.7	
5	2	Katalin Balogh	Hungary	8.8	
1	3	Anneliese Ehrhardt	East Germany	8.2	Q, =WB
2	3	Margit Bach	West Germany	8.5	Q
3	3	Grażyna Rabsztyn	Poland	8.6	Q
4	3	Valentina Tikhomirova	Soviet Union	8.7	
5	3	Penka Sokolova	Bulgaria	8.9	
6	3	Valeria Biduleac	Romania	8.9	
1	4	Teresa Sukniewicz	Poland	8.3	Q
2	4	Mieke Sterk	Netherlands	8.5	Q
3	4	Heidi Schüller	West Germany	8.5	Q
4	4	Tatyana Kondrasheva	Soviet Union	8.6	
5	4	Carmen Mähr	Austria	8.8	
6	4	Elena Mirza	Romania	9.1	

=== Semifinals ===
First 3 from each heat (Q) qualified directly for the final.

Rank	Heat	Name	Nationality	Time	Notes
1	1	Karin Balzer	East Germany	8.3	Q
2	1	Teresa Sukniewicz	Poland	8.3	Q
3	1	Valeria Bufanu	Romania	8.4	Q
4	1	Margit Bach	West Germany	8.5	
5	1	Liudmila Ievleva	Soviet Union	8.6	
6	1	Manon Bornholdt	West Germany	8.7	
1	2	Anneliese Ehrhardt	East Germany	8.2	Q, =WB
2	2	Meta Antenen	Switzerland	8.3	Q, NR
3	2	Danuta Straszyńska	Poland	8.5	Q
4	2	Grażyna Rabsztyn	Poland	8.5	
5	2	Mieke Sterk	Netherlands	8.6	
	2	Heidi Schüller	West Germany	DNF	

=== Final ===
Rank	Lane	Name	Nationality	Time	Notes
1st place, gold medalist(s)	5	Karin Balzer	East Germany	8.1	WB
2nd place, silver medalist(s)	4	Anneliese Ehrhardt	East Germany	8.1	WB
3rd place, bronze medalist(s)	3	Teresa Sukniewicz	Poland	8.3	
4	2	Meta Antenen	Switzerland	8.3	=NR
5	1	Danuta Straszyńska	Poland	8.5	
6	6	Valeria Bufanu	Romania	8.9	
