= 1971 European Athletics Championships – Women's 100 metres hurdles =

Women's 100 metres hurdles at the European Athletics Championships

The women's 100 metres hurdles at the 1971 European Athletics Championships was held in Helsinki, Finland, at Helsinki Olympic Stadium on 12 and 13 August 1971.

== Medalists ==
Gold	Karin Balzer; East Germany
Silver	Anneliese Ehrhardt; East Germany
Bronze	Teresa Sukniewicz; Poland

== Results ==
=== Final ===
13 August Wind: 0.0 m/s

Rank	Name	Nationality	Time	Notes
1st place, gold medalist(s)	Karin Balzer	East Germany	12.94	CR
2nd place, silver medalist(s)	Anneliese Ehrhardt	East Germany	12.96	
3rd place, bronze medalist(s)	Teresa Sukniewicz	Poland	13.21	
4	Danuta Straszyńska	Poland	13.34	
5	Meta Antenen	Switzerland	13.35	
6	Teresa Nowak	Poland	13.46	
7	Valeria Bufanu	Romania	13.47	
8	Tatyana Poluboyarova	Soviet Union	13.69	

=== Semi-finals ===
12 August

==== Semi-final 1 ====
Wind: -0.8 m/s

Rank	Name	Nationality	Time	Notes
1	Karin Balzer	East Germany	13.20	CR Q
2	Valeria Bufanu	Romania	13.31	Q
3	Teresa Nowak	Poland	13.46	Q
4	Meta Antenen	Switzerland	13.47	Q
5	Margit Bach	West Germany	13.78	
6	Jacqueline André	France	14.05	
7	Sirkka Norrlund	Finland	15.55	
	Ingunn Einarsdóttir	Iceland	DNS	

==== Semi-final 2 ====
Wind: 0.2 m/s

Rank	Name	Nationality	Time	Notes
1	Anneliese Ehrhardt	East Germany	13.11	CR Q
2	Danuta Straszyńska	Poland	13.39	Q
3	Teresa Sukniewicz	Poland	13.40	Q
4	Tatyana Poluboyarova	Soviet Union	13.56	Q
5	Gun Olsson	Sweden	13.80	
6	Jeanne Schoebel	France	14.11	
7	Ileana Ongar	Italy	14.45	
8	Margaret Murphy	Ireland	15.20	

=== Heats ===
12 August

==== Heat 1 ====
Wind: 0 m/s

Rank	Name	Nationality	Time	Notes
1	Valeria Bufanu	Romania	13.46	Q
2	Teresa Nowak	Poland	13.56	Q
3	Gun Olsson	Sweden	14.04	Q
4	Sirkka Norrlund	Finland	14.05	Q
5	Jeanne Schoebel	France	14.30	Q
6	Sheila Garnett	Great Britain	15.15	

==== Heat 2 ====
Wind: 0 m/s

Rank	Name	Nationality	Time	Notes
1	Karin Balzer	East Germany	13.30	CR Q
2	Danuta Straszyńska	Poland	13.50	Q
3	Margit Bach	West Germany	13.62	Q
4	Ileana Ongar	Italy	14.51	Q
5	Ingunn Einarsdóttir	Iceland	15.92	Q

==== Heat 3 ====
Wind: 0 m/s

Rank	Name	Nationality	Time	Notes
1	Anneliese Ehrhardt	East Germany	13.29	CR Q
2	Teresa Sukniewicz	Poland	13.38	Q
3	Tatyana Poluboyarova	Soviet Union	13.53	Q
4	Meta Antenen	Switzerland	13.54	Q
5	Jacqueline André	France	14.44	Q
6	Margaret Murphy	Ireland	15.09	q

== Participation ==
According to an unofficial count, 17 athletes from 13 countries participated in the event.

- East Germany (2)
- Finland (1)
- France (2)
- Iceland (1)
- Ireland (1)
- Italy (1)
- Poland (3)
- Romania (1)
- Soviet Union (1)
- Sweden (1)
- Switzerland (1)
- Great Britain (1)
- West Germany (1)
