= 1972 European Athletics Indoor Championships – Women's 50 metres hurdles =

The women's 50 metres hurdles event at the 1972 European Athletics Indoor Championships was held on 11 March in Grenoble.

== Medalists ==
| Gold | Silver | Bronze |
|---|---|---|
| Anneliese Ehrhardt; East Germany | Teresa Sukniewicz; Poland | Grażyna Rabsztyn; Poland |

== Results ==
=== Heats ===
First 2 from each heat (Q) and the next 4 fastest (q) qualified for the semifinals.

| Rank | Heat | Name | Nationality | Time | Notes |
|---|---|---|---|---|---|
| 1 | 4 | Anneliese Ehrhardt | East Germany | 6.87 | Q, WB |
| 2 | 3 | Grażyna Rabsztyn | Poland | 7.05 | Q, NR |
| 3 | 1 | Teresa Sukniewicz | Poland | 7.09 | Q |
| 3 | 2 | Tatyana Poluboyarova | Soviet Union | 7.09 | Q |
| 5 | 2 | Teresa Nowak | Poland | 7.11 | Q |
| 6 | 2 | Margit Bach | West Germany | 7.14 | q, NR |
| 7 | 3 | Meta Antenen | Switzerland | 7.15 | Q, NR |
| 8 | 2 | Mary Peters | Great Britain | 7.17 | q, NR |
| 8 | 4 | Carmen Mähr | Austria | 7.17 | Q, NR |
| 10 | 3 | Ann Wilson | Great Britain | 7.22 | q |
| 11 | 3 | Valeria Bufanu | Romania | 7.23 | q |
| 12 | 4 | Ivanka Koshnicharska | Bulgaria | 7.26 | |
| 13 | 1 | Lyubov Kononova | Soviet Union | 7.28 | Q |
| 14 | 2 | Gunhild Olsson | Sweden | 7.29 | NR |
| 15 | 3 | Jacqueline André | France | 7.31 | |
| 15 | 4 | Elfriede Meierholz | West Germany | 7.31 | |
| 17 | 1 | Nadine Fricault | France | 7.35 | |
| 18 | 4 | Viera Sláviková | Czechoslovakia | 7.40 | |
| 19 | 1 | Monika Schönauerová | Czechoslovakia | 7.41 | |
| 20 | 1 | Ileana Ongar | Italy | 7.45 | |
| 21 | 2 | Doris Langhans | Austria | 7.53 | |

=== Semifinals ===
First 3 from each heat (Q) qualified directly for the final.

| Rank | Heat | Name | Nationality | Time | Notes |
|---|---|---|---|---|---|
| 1 | 1 | Anneliese Ehrhardt | East Germany | 6.85 | Q, WB |
| 2 | 1 | Teresa Sukniewicz | Poland | 6.98 | Q, NR |
| 3 | 1 | Meta Antenen | Switzerland | 7.01 | Q, NR |
| 4 | 2 | Grażyna Rabsztyn | Poland | 7.04 | Q |
| 5 | 2 | Margit Bach | West Germany | 7.09 | Q, NR |
| 6 | 1 | Teresa Nowak | Poland | 7.11 | |
| 7 | 2 | Carmen Mähr | Austria | 7.15 | Q, NR |
| 8 | 1 | Mary Peters | Great Britain | 7.16 | NR |
| 9 | 2 | Tatyana Poluboyarova | Soviet Union | 7.17 | |
| 10 | 2 | Ann Wilson | Great Britain | 7.21 | |
| 11 | 1 | Lyubov Kononova | Soviet Union | 7.45 | |
| | 2 | Valeria Bufanu | Romania | DNS | |

=== Final ===
| Rank | Name | Nationality | Time | Notes |
|---|---|---|---|---|
| 1st place, gold medalist(s) | Anneliese Ehrhardt | East Germany | 6.85 | =WB |
| 2nd place, silver medalist(s) | Teresa Sukniewicz | Poland | 6.94 | NR |
| 3rd place, bronze medalist(s) | Grażyna Rabsztyn | Poland | 7.05 | |
| 4 | Meta Antenen | Switzerland | 7.05 | |
| 5 | Margit Bach | West Germany | 7.10 | |
| 6 | Carmen Mähr | Austria | 7.40 | |
