= 1974 European Athletics Indoor Championships – Women's 60 metres hurdles =

The women's 60 metres hurdles event at the 1974 European Athletics Indoor Championships was held on 9 March in Gothenburg.

== Medalists ==
Gold	Gold	Bronze
Annerose Fiedler; East Germany	Grażyna Rabsztyn; Poland	Meta Antenen; Switzerland

== Results ==
=== Heats ===
First 4 from each heat (Q) qualified directly for the semifinals.

Rank	Heat	Name	Nationality	Time	Notes
1	1	Annelie Ehrhardt	East Germany	8.04	Q
2	2	Annerose Fiedler	East Germany	8.17	Q
3	1	Tatyana Vorokhobko	Soviet Union	8.27	Q
4	1	Meta Antenen	Switzerland	8.30	Q
5	2	Judy Vernon	Great Britain	8.31	Q
6	1	Grażyna Rabsztyn	Poland	8.32	Q
7	2	Ilona Bruzsenyák	Hungary	8.35	Q
8	3	Valeria Ștefănescu	Romania	8.37	Q
9	1	Silvia Käwel	West Germany	8.38	
9	3	Teresa Nowak	Poland	8.38	Q
11	2	Mieke van Wissen-Sterk	Netherlands	8.41	Q
11	3	Gudrun Berend	East Germany	8.41	Q
13	2	Chantal Réga	France	8.48	
14	3	Carmen Mähr	Austria	8.52	Q
15	1	Ivanka Koshnicharska	Bulgaria	8.63	
16	1	Rita Bottiglieri	Italy	8.75	
16	2	Natalya Lebedeva	Soviet Union	8.75	
18	3	Antonella Battaglia	Italy	8.82	
	3	Florence Picaut	France	DNF	

=== Semifinals ===
First 4 from each heat (Q) qualified directly for the final.

Rank	Heat	Name	Nationality	Time	Notes
1	1	Annelie Ehrhardt	East Germany	7.90	Q, WB
2	2	Annerose Fiedler	East Germany	8.10	Q
3	1	Meta Antenen	Switzerland	8.19	Q, NR
4	2	Tatyana Vorokhobko	Soviet Union	8.20	Q
5	2	Grażyna Rabsztyn	Poland	8.22	Q
6	1	Judy Vernon	Great Britain	8.23	Q
7	1	Teresa Nowak	Poland	8.27	Q
8	1	Valeria Ștefănescu	Romania	8.28	
9	2	Ilona Bruzsenyák	Hungary	8.31	Q
10	2	Gudrun Berend	East Germany	8.34	
11	2	Mieke van Wissen-Sterk	Netherlands	8.46	
12	1	Carmen Mähr	Austria	8.56	

=== Final ===
Rank	Name	Nationality	Time	Notes
1st place, gold medalist(s)	Annerose Fiedler	East Germany	8.08	ex aequo
1st place, gold medalist(s)	Grażyna Rabsztyn	Poland	8.08	ex aequo
3rd place, bronze medalist(s)	Meta Antenen	Switzerland	8.19	=NR
4	Judy Vernon	Great Britain	8.25	
5	Tatyana Vorokhobko	Soviet Union	8.26	
6	Ilona Bruzsenyák	Hungary	8.39	
	Teresa Nowak	Poland	DNF	
	Annelie Ehrhardt	East Germany	DNS	
