= 1974 European Athletics Championships – Women's 100 metres hurdles =

Women's 100 metres hurdles at the European Athletics Championships

The women's 100 metres hurdles at the 1974 European Athletics Championships was held in Rome, Italy, at Stadio Olimpico on 6 and 7 September 1974.

== Medalists ==
Gold	Anneliese Ehrhardt; East Germany
Silver	Annerose Fiedler; East Germany
Bronze	Teresa Nowak; Poland

== Results ==
=== Final ===
7 September Wind: 0.2 m/s

Rank	Name	Nationality	Time	Notes
1st place, gold medalist(s)	Anneliese Ehrhardt	East Germany	12.66	CR
2nd place, silver medalist(s)	Annerose Fiedler	East Germany	12.89	
3rd place, bronze medalist(s)	Teresa Nowak	Poland	12.91	
4	Valeria Bufanu	Romania	13.04	
5	Gudrun Berend	East Germany	13.14	
6	Tatyana Anisimova	Soviet Union	13.16	
7	Natalya Lebedeva	Soviet Union	13.19	
8	Grażyna Rabsztyn	Poland	13.53	

=== Semi-finals ===
6 September

==== Semi-final 1 ====
Wind: -1.3 m/s

Rank	Name	Nationality	Time	Notes
1	Anneliese Ehrhardt	East Germany	13.03	Q
2	Valeria Bufanu	Romania	13.26	Q
3	Natalya Lebedeva	Soviet Union	13.34	Q
4	Grażyna Rabsztyn	Poland	13.48	Q
5	Penka Sokolova	Bulgaria	13.60	
6	Lorna Drysdale	Great Britain	13.68	
7	Chantal Réga	France	13.78	
8	Bożena Nowakowska	Poland	13.95	

==== Semi-final 2 ====
Wind: -1.6 m/s

Rank	Name	Nationality	Time	Notes
1	Teresa Nowak	Poland	13.18	Q
2	Annerose Fiedler	East Germany	13.28	Q
3	Tatyana Anisimova	Soviet Union	13.35	Q
4	Gudrun Berend	East Germany	13.51	Q
5	Judy Vernon	Great Britain	13.65	
6	Blondelle Thompson	Great Britain	13.72	
7	Marlies Koschinski	West Germany	13.90	
8	Margit Hansen	Denmark	14.11	

=== Heats ===
6 September

==== Heat 1 ====
Wind: 1.3 m/s

Rank	Name	Nationality	Time	Notes
1	Anneliese Ehrhardt	East Germany	13.32	Q
2	Judy Vernon	Great Britain	13.74	Q
3	Marlies Koschinski	West Germany	13.84	Q
4	Margit Hansen	Denmark	14.12	Q
5	Bożena Nowakowska	Poland	14.23	q
6	Antonella Battaglia	Italy	14.36	
	Meta Antenen	Switzerland	DNS	

==== Heat 2 ====
Wind: -0.5 m/s

Rank	Name	Nationality	Time	Notes
1	Annerose Fiedler	East Germany	13.48	Q
2	Tatyana Anisimova	Soviet Union	13.54	Q
3	Grażyna Rabsztyn	Poland	13.71	Q
4	Valeria Bufanu	Romania	13.83	Q
5	Lorna Drysdale	Great Britain	13.97	q
	Ilona Bruzsenyák	Hungary	DNS	

==== Heat 3 ====
Wind: -1.6 m/s

Rank	Name	Nationality	Time	Notes
1	Teresa Nowak	Poland	13.20	Q
2	Natalya Lebedeva	Soviet Union	13.52	Q
3	Penka Sokolova	Bulgaria	13.65	Q
4	Gudrun Berend	East Germany	13.66	Q
5	Chantal Réga	France	13.72	q
6	Blondelle Thompson	Great Britain	13.76	q

== Participation ==
According to an unofficial count, 17 athletes from 10 countries participated in the event.

- Bulgaria (1)
- Denmark (1)
- East Germany (3)
- France (1)
- Italy (1)
- Poland (3)
- Romania (1)
- Soviet Union (2)
- Great Britain (3)
- West Germany (1)
