= Athletics at the 1972 Summer Olympics – Women's 100 metres hurdles =

Women's 100 metres hurdles at the Games of the XX Olympiad
- Venue: Olympic Stadium, Munich, West Germany
- Date: 4 September 1972 & 8 September 1972
- Competitors: 25 from 15 nations
- Winning time: 12.59 WR

Medalists
| 1st place, gold medalist(s) | | Annelie Ehrhardt; East Germany |
| 2nd place, silver medalist(s) | | Valeria Bufanu; Romania |
| 3rd place, bronze medalist(s) | | Karin Balzer; East Germany |

These are the official results of the Women's 100 metres hurdles event at the 1972 Summer Olympics in Munich. The competition was held on the 4 & 8 of September. This was the first time this distance for women was held at the Olympics; the previous distance of 80 metres were discontinued after the 1968 Games. Pam Kilborn and Karin Balzer were back for their third Olympic games.

== Heats ==
The top four runners in each heat advanced to the semifinal round.

=== Heat one ===
| Rank | Athlete | Nation | Lane | Time | Notes |
|---|---|---|---|---|---|
| 1 | Annelie Ehrhardt | East Germany | 3 | 12.70 | OR |
| 2 | Pam Kilborn | Australia | 1 | 12.93 | |
| 3 | Teresa Nowak | Poland | 5 | 13.16 | |
| 4 | Esther Shakhamorov | Israel | 2 | 13.17 | |
| 5 | Judy Vernon | Great Britain | 6 | 13.37 | |
| 6 | Lucila Salao | Philippines | 7 | 15.15 | |
| - | Edith Noeding | Peru | 4 | DNS | |

=== Heat two ===
| Rank | Athlete | Nation | Lane | Time |
|---|---|---|---|---|
| 1 | Valeria Bufanu | Romania | 2 | 12.94 |
| 2 | Danuta Straszyńska | Poland | 1 | 13.03 |
| 3 | Margit Bach | West Germany | 5 | 13.46 |
| 4 | Lacey O’Neal | United States | 3 | 13.78 |
| 5 | Brenda Matthews | New Zealand | 4 | 13.81 |
| 6 | Penny Gillies | Australia | 6 | 13.82 |

=== Heat three ===
| Rank | Athlete | Nation | Lane | Time |
|---|---|---|---|---|
| 1 | Grażyna Rabsztyn | Poland | 1 | 13.29 |
| 2 | Annerose Krumpholz | East Germany | 3 | 13.31 |
| 3 | Mamie Rallins | United States | 4 | 13.51 |
| 4 | Meta Antenen | Switzerland | 2 | 13.61 |
| 5 | Maureen Caird | Australia | 6 | 13.63 |
| 6 | Margaret Murphy | Ireland | 5 | 15.89 |
| - | Mary Peters | Great Britain | 7 | DNS |

=== Heat four ===
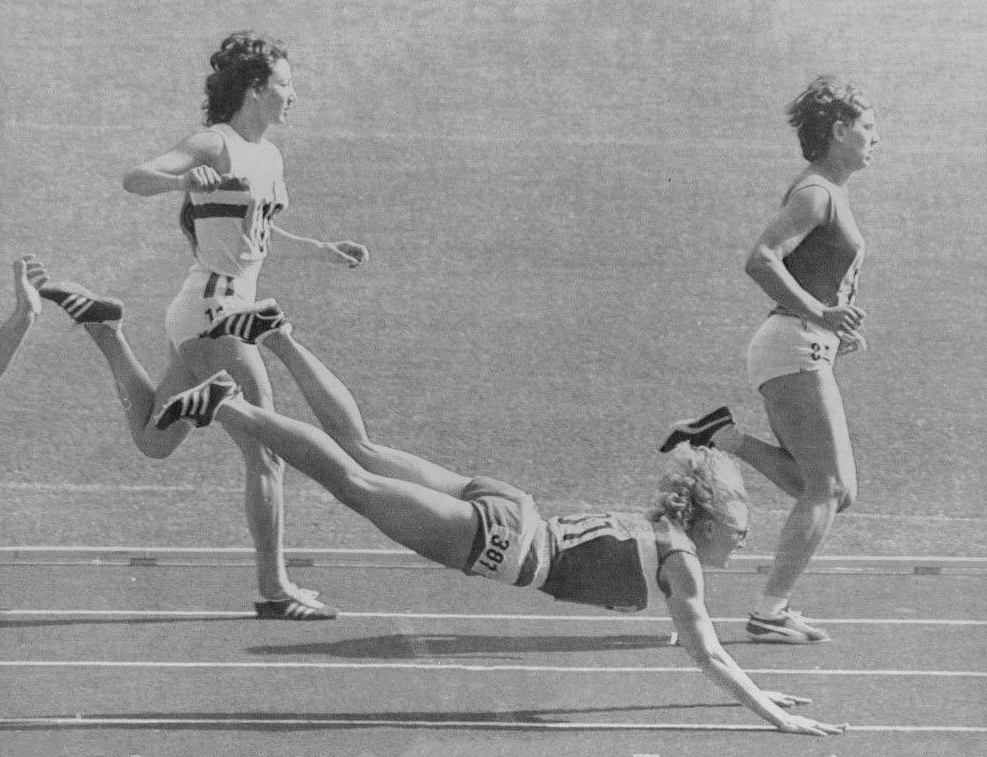
Left-right: Ann Wilson, Patty Johnson, Jacqueline André in heat four

| Rank | Athlete | Nation | Lane | Time |
|---|---|---|---|---|
| 1 | Karin Balzer | East Germany | 7 | 13.10 |
| 2 | Patty Johnson | United States | 3 | 13.28 |
| 3 | Jacqueline André | France | 2 | 13.33 |
| 4 | Heidi Schüller | West Germany | 6 | 13.50 |
| 5 | Ann Wilson | Great Britain | 1 | 13.53 |
| 6 | Gunhild Olsson | Sweden | 5 | 14.37 |
| 7 | Emilie Edet | Nigeria | 4 | 14.67 |

== Semifinals ==
Top four in each heat advanced to the final round.

=== Heat one ===
| Rank | Athlete | Nation | Lane | Time |
|---|---|---|---|---|
| 1 | Valeria Bufanu | Romania | 1 | 12.84 |
| 2 | Pam Kilborn | Australia | 8 | 12.95 |
| 3 | Karin Balzer | East Germany | 6 | 12.97 |
| 4 | Teresa Nowak | Poland | 4 | 13.10 |
| 5 | Patty Johnson | United States | 5 | 13.26 |
| 6 | Margit Bach | West Germany | 3 | 13.31 |
| 7 | Mamie Rallins | United States | 2 | 13.76 |
| - | Meta Antenen | Switzerland | 7 | DNF |

=== Heat two ===
| Rank | Athlete | Nation | Lane | Time |
|---|---|---|---|---|
| 1 | Annelie Ehrhardt | East Germany | 2 | 12.73 |
| 2 | Danuta Straszyńska | Poland | 3 | 12.91 |
| 3 | Annerose Krumpholz | East Germany | 7 | 13.24 |
| 4 | Grażyna Rabsztyn | Poland | 8 | 13.24 |
| 5 | Jacqueline André | France | 5 | 13.30 |
| 6 | Heidi Schüller | West Germany | 6 | 13.33 |
| 7 | Lacey O’Neal | United States | 1 | 13.89 |
| - | Esther Shakhamorov | Israel | 4 | DNS |

== Final ==
| Rank | Athlete | Nation | Lane | Time | Notes |
|---|---|---|---|---|---|
| 1st place, gold medalist(s) | Annelie Ehrhardt | East Germany | 6 | 12.59 | WR |
| 2nd place, silver medalist(s) | Valeria Bufanu | Romania | 7 | 12.84 | |
| 3rd place, bronze medalist(s) | Karin Balzer | East Germany | 5 | 12.90 | |
| 4 | Pam Kilborn | Australia | 3 | 12.98 | |
| 5 | Teresa Nowak | Poland | 1 | 13.17 | |
| 6 | Danuta Straszyńska | Poland | 8 | 13.18 | |
| 7 | Annerose Krumpholz | East Germany | 2 | 13.27 | |
| 8 | Grażyna Rabsztyn | Poland | 4 | 13.44 | |

Key: WR = world record; OR = Olympic record; DNS = did not start; DNF = did not finish
