= Athletics at the 1973 Summer Universiade – Women's 100 metres hurdles =

The women's 100 metres hurdles event at the 1973 Summer Universiade was held at the Central Lenin Stadium in Moscow on 18, 19 and 20 August.

== Medalists ==
Gold	Silver	Bronze
Grażyna Rabsztyn; Poland	Annerose Krumpholz; East Germany	Natalya Lebedeva; Soviet Union

== Results ==
=== Heats ===
Wind:
Heat 1: -0.2 m/s, Heat 5: +1.0 m/s

Rank	Heat	Athlete	Nationality	Time	Notes
1	1	Jacqueline André	France	13.99	Q
2	1	Carmen Mähr	Austria	14.4	Q
3	1	Marlene Elejarde	Cuba	14.5	q
4	1	Viviane Nouailhetas-Simon	Brazil	15.5	
1	2	Grażyna Rabsztyn	Poland	13.6	Q
2	2	Natalya Lebedeva	Soviet Union	13.7	Q
3	2	Jindřiška Krchová	Czechoslovakia	14.5	q
4	2	Deanne Carlsen	United States	14.54	q
1	3	Annerose Krumpholz	East Germany	13.5	Q
2	3	Wendy Taylor	Canada	14.0	Q
3	3	Tomomi Hayashida	Japan	14.6	q
4	3	Mercedes Román	Mexico	15.0	
1	4	Teresa Sukniewicz	Poland	14.0	Q
2	4	Ileana Ongar	Italy	14.3	Q
3	4	Uta Nolte	West Germany	14.3	q
4	4	Patrice Donnelly	United States	15.0	q
1	5	Lyubov Kononova	Soviet Union	13.9	Q
2	5	Chantal Marin	France	14.23	Q

=== Semifinals ===
Wind:
Heat 1: +0.1 m/s, Heat 2: -0.9 m/s

Rank	Heat	Athlete	Nationality	Time	Notes
1	1	Grażyna Rabsztyn	Poland	13.46	Q
2	1	Natalya Lebedeva	Soviet Union	13.61	Q
3	1	Jacqueline André	France	13.81	Q
4	1	Wendy Taylor	Canada	13.9	q
5	1	Uta Nolte	West Germany	13.91	q
6	1	Carmen Mähr	Austria	14.0	
7	1	Tomomi Hayashida	Japan	14.3	
	1	Deanne Carlsen	United States	?	
1	2	Annerose Krumpholz	East Germany	13.55	Q
2	2	Teresa Sukniewicz	Poland	13.71	Q
3	2	Lyubov Kononova	Soviet Union	13.98	Q
4	2	Marlene Elejarde	Cuba	14.0	
5	2	Ileana Ongar	Italy	14.1	
6	2	Jindřiška Krchová	Czechoslovakia	14.3	
7	2	Chantal Marin	France	14.50	
8	2	Patrice Donnelly	United States	14.6	

=== Final ===
Wind: +0.6 m/s

Rank	Athlete	Nationality	Time	Notes
1st place, gold medalist(s)	Grażyna Rabsztyn	Poland	13.23	
2nd place, silver medalist(s)	Annerose Krumpholz	East Germany	13.38	
3rd place, bronze medalist(s)	Natalya Lebedeva	Soviet Union	13.50	
4	Teresa Sukniewicz	Poland	13.67	
5	Lyubov Kononova	Soviet Union	13.84	
6	Uta Nolte	West Germany	14.06	
7	Wendy Taylor	Canada	14.06	
8	Jacqueline André	France	14.13	
