= 1975 European Athletics Indoor Championships – Women's 60 metres hurdles =

The women's 60 metres hurdles event at the 1975 European Athletics Indoor Championships was held on 8 March in Katowice.

== Medalists ==
Gold	Silver	Bronze
Grażyna Rabsztyn; Poland	Annelie Ehrhardt; East Germany	Tatyana Anisimova; Soviet Union

== Results ==
=== Heats ===
First 2 from each heat (Q) and the next 4 fastest (q) qualified for the final.

Rank	Heat	Name	Nationality	Time	Notes
1	1	Grażyna Rabsztyn	Poland	8.06	Q
2	2	Annelie Ehrhardt	East Germany	8.16	Q
3	1	Tatyana Anisimova	Soviet Union	8.20	Q
4	1	Meta Antenen	Switzerland	8.22	q
5	1	Annerose Fiedler	East Germany	8.24	q
6	2	Tatyana Vorokhobko	Soviet Union	8.25	Q
7	1	Sylvia Kempin	East Germany	8.30	
8	2	Teresa Nowak	Poland	8.32	
9	2	Teresa Sukniewicz-Kleiber	Poland	8.41	
10	1	Chantal Réga	France	8.50	
11	2	Mieke van Wissen-Sterk	Netherlands	8.54	
12	2	Penka Boneva	Bulgaria	8.55	

=== Final ===
Rank	Lane	Name	Nationality	Time	Notes
1st place, gold medalist(s)	3	Grażyna Rabsztyn	Poland	8.04	
2nd place, silver medalist(s)	4	Annelie Ehrhardt	East Germany	8.12	
3rd place, bronze medalist(s)	2	Tatyana Anisimova	Soviet Union	8.21	
4	1	Annerose Fiedler	East Germany	8.25	
5	6	Tatyana Vorokhobko	Soviet Union	8.40	
6	5	Meta Antenen	Switzerland	8.60	
