= Athletics at the 1977 Summer Universiade – Women's 100 metres hurdles =

The women's 100 metres hurdles event at the 1977 Summer Universiade was held at the Vasil Levski National Stadium in Sofia on 20 August.

== Medalists ==
Gold	Silver	Bronze
Grażyna Rabsztyn; Poland	Tatyana Anisimova; Soviet Union	Natalya Lebedeva; Soviet Union

== Results ==
=== Heats ===
Wind:
Heat 1: -0.2 m/s, Heat 2: ? m/s, Heat 3: ? m/s

Rank	Heat	Athlete	Nationality	Time	Notes
1	3	Grażyna Rabsztyn	Poland	12.76	Q
2	1	Bożena Nowakowska	Poland	13.08	Q
3	1	Annerose Fiedler	East Germany	13.10	Q
4	3	Tatyana Anisimova	Soviet Union	13.19	Q
5	2	Natalya Lebedeva	Soviet Union	13.20	Q
6	3	Ursula Schalück	West Germany	13.49	q
7	1	Patty van Wolvelaere	United States	13.58	q
8	2	Nadine Prévost	France	13.69	Q
9	2	Lidiya Gusheva	Bulgaria	13.71	
10	3	Ginka Zagorcheva	Bulgaria	14.01	
11	3	Dai Jianhua	China	14.02	
12	2	Doris Mandl	Austria	14.12	
13	2	Carla Lunghi	Italy	14.18	
14	2	Elissavet Pantazi	Greece	14.19	
15	1	Grisel Machado	Cuba	14.21	
16	1	Liza Damman	Canada	14.26	
17	3	Jean Sparling	Canada	14.32	
18	1	Michèle Chardonnet	France	14.34	
19	2	Vilma Paris	Puerto Rico	14.88	
20	3	Eman Fahti	Iraq	15.56	

=== Final ===
Wind: -0.6 m/s

Rank	Athlete	Nationality	Time	Notes
1st place, gold medalist(s)	Grażyna Rabsztyn	Poland	12.86	
2nd place, silver medalist(s)	Tatyana Anisimova	Soviet Union	13.03	
3rd place, bronze medalist(s)	Natalya Lebedeva	Soviet Union	13.05	
4	Bożena Nowakowska	Poland	13.07	
5	Patty van Wolvelaere	United States	13.36	
6	Annerose Fiedler	East Germany	13.38	
7	Ursula Schalück	West Germany	13.50	
8	Nadine Prévost	France	13.74	
