= Athletics at the 1975 Summer Universiade – Women's 100 metres hurdles =

The women's 100 metres hurdles event at the 1975 Summer Universiade was held at the Stadio Olimpico in Rome on 19 and 20 September.

== Medalists ==
Gold	Silver	Bronze
Grażyna Rabsztyn; Poland	Bożena Nowakowska; Poland	Tatyana Anisimova; Soviet Union

== Results ==
=== Heats ===
Rank	Heat	Athlete	Nationality	Time	Notes
1	2	Grażyna Rabsztyn	Poland	13.27	Q
2	3	Bożena Nowakowska	Poland	13.35	Q
3	2	Patty Johnson	United States	13.55	Q
4	1	Tatyana Anisimova	Soviet Union	13.58	Q
5	2	Ileana Ongar	Italy	13.76	q
6	1	Modupe Oshikoya	Nigeria	13.84	Q
7	1	Antonella Battaglia	Italy	13.94	q
8	3	Nadine Prévost	France	13.97	Q
9	1	Liz Damman	Canada	14.02	
10	3	Zoya Spasovkhodskaya	Soviet Union	14.25	
11	2	Anne-Marie Pira	Belgium	14.51	
12	3	Doris Langhans	Austria	14.75	
13	1	Viviane Nouailhetas-Simon	Brazil	14.89	
14	3	Marilene Eberhardt	Brazil	15.06	
15	2	Christine Hermeline	France	15.15	

=== Final ===
Wind: 0.0 m/s

Rank	Athlete	Nationality	Time	Notes
1st place, gold medalist(s)	Grażyna Rabsztyn	Poland	13.14	
2nd place, silver medalist(s)	Bożena Nowakowska	Poland	13.34	
3rd place, bronze medalist(s)	Tatyana Anisimova	Soviet Union	13.64	
4	Nadine Prévost	France	13.67	
5	Ileana Ongar	Italy	13.90	
6	Modupe Oshikoya	Nigeria	13.91	
7	Patty Johnson	United States	14.00	
8	Antonella Battaglia	Italy	14.10	
