= 1978 European Athletics Championships – Women's 100 metres hurdles =

Women's 100 metres hurdles at the European Athletics Championships

The women's 100 metres hurdles at the 1978 European Athletics Championships was held in Prague, then Czechoslovakia, at Stadion Evžena Rošického on 31 August and 2 September 1978.

== Medalists ==
Gold	Johanna Klier; East Germany
Silver	Tatyana Anisimova; Soviet Union
Bronze	Gudrun Berend; East Germany

== Results ==
=== Final ===
2 September Wind: 0.6 m/s

Rank	Lane	Name	Nationality	Time	Notes
1st place, gold medalist(s)	4	Johanna Klier	East Germany	12.62	
2nd place, silver medalist(s)	5	Tatyana Anisimova	Soviet Union	12.67	
3rd place, bronze medalist(s)	1	Gudrun Berend	East Germany	12.73	
4	3	Nina Margulina	Soviet Union	12.86	
5	8	Lucyna Langer	Poland	12.98	
6	6	Annerose Fiedler	East Germany	13.09	
7	7	Elżbieta Rabsztyn	Poland	13.17	
	2	Grażyna Rabsztyn	Poland	DQ	

Note: The final originally took place on 1 September but during its course Grażyna Rabsztyn veered off onto the neighbouring lane and caused Nina Margulina to fall down. Because of this the race was re-run a day later without Grażyna Rabsztyn, with the same athletes taking the medals in exactly the same order.

=== Semi-finals ===
31 August

==== Semi-final 1 ====
Wind: -0.2 m/s

Rank	Name	Nationality	Time	Notes
1	Grażyna Rabsztyn	Poland	12.60	CR Q
2	Johanna Klier	East Germany	12.90	Q
3	Nina Margulina	Soviet Union	13.00	Q
4	Annerose Fiedler	East Germany	13.07	Q
5	Sharon Colyear	Great Britain	13.25	
6	Xénia Siska	Hungary	13.36	
7	Monika Schönauerová	Czechoslovakia	13.72	
8	Ileana Ongar	Italy	13.90	

==== Semi-final 2 ====
Wind: 0.2 m/s

Rank	Name	Nationality	Time	Notes
1	Gudrun Berend	East Germany	12.90	Q
2	Tatyana Anisimova	Soviet Union	12.92	Q
3	Lucyna Langer	Poland	13.00	Q
4	Elżbieta Rabsztyn	Poland	13.14	Q
5	Lorna Boothe	Great Britain	13.44	
6	Elisavet Pantazi	Greece	13.82	
	Sylvia Kempin	East Germany	DNF	
	Lidiya Gusheva	Bulgaria	DNS	

=== Heats ===
31 August

==== Heat 1 ====
Wind: -0.3 m/s

Rank	Name	Nationality	Time	Notes
1	Grazyna Rabsztyn	Poland	12.94	Q
2	Nina Margulina	Soviet Union	13.04	Q
3	Gudrun Berend	East Germany	13.26	Q
4	Xénia Siska	Hungary	13.48	Q
5	Shirley Strong	Great Britain	13.56	
6	Laurence Elloy	France	14.07	

==== Heat 2 ====
Wind: 1.8 m/s

Rank	Name	Nationality	Time	Notes
1	Johanna Klier	East Germany	12.85	Q
2	Lucyna Langer	Poland	13.13	Q
3	Sharon Colyear	Great Britain	13.23	Q
4	Sylvia Kempin	East Germany	13.40	Q
5	Laurence Lebeau	France	13.60	
6	Hilde Fredriksen	Norway	13.63	

==== Heat 3 ====
Wind: -1.9 m/s

Rank	Name	Nationality	Time	Notes
1	Elżbieta Rabsztyn	Poland	13.20	Q
2	Lorna Boothe	Great Britain	13.46	Q
3	Lidiya Gusheva	Bulgaria	13.52	Q
4	Monika Schönauerová	Czechoslovakia	13.61	Q
5	Lena Spoof	Finland	13.63	

==== Heat 4 ====
Wind: 0.4 m/s

Rank	Name	Nationality	Time	Notes
1	Tatyana Anisimova	Soviet Union	12.85	Q
2	Annerose Fiedler	East Germany	13.43	Q
3	Ileana Ongar	Italy	13.74	Q
4	Elisavet Pantazi	Greece	13.84	Q
5	Dorthe Rasmussen	Denmark	13.95	
6	Hana Chocová	Czechoslovakia	14.04	

== Participation ==
According to an unofficial count, 23 athletes from 13 countries participated in the event.

- Bulgaria (1)
- Czechoslovakia (2)
- Denmark (1)
- East Germany (4)
- Finland (1)
- France (2)
- Greece (1)
- Hungary (1)
- Italy (1)
- Norway (1)
- Poland (3)
- Soviet Union (2)
- Great Britain (3)
