= Athletics at the 1976 Summer Olympics – Women's 100 metres hurdles =

Women's 100 metres hurdles at the Games of the XXI Olympiad
- Venue: Olympic Stadium
- Date: July 28–29, 1976
- Competitors: 21 from 15 nations
- Winning time: 12.77

Medalists
1st place, gold medalist(s)		Johanna Schaller; East Germany
2nd place, silver medalist(s)		Tatyana Anisimova; Soviet Union
3rd place, bronze medalist(s)		Natalya Lebedeva; Soviet Union

The women's 100 metres hurdles competition at the 1976 Summer Olympics in Montreal, Quebec, Canada was held at the Olympic Stadium on July 28–29.

== Competition format ==
The Women's 100m hurdles competition consisted of heats (Round 1), Semifinals and a Final. The four fastest competitors from each race in the heats qualified for the semifinals. The top four athletes from each semifinals race advanced to the final.

== Records ==
Prior to this competition, the existing world and Olympic records were as follows:

World record	Annelie Ehrhardt (GDR)	12.59	Munich, West Germany	8 September 1972
Olympic record	Annelie Ehrhardt (GDR)	12.59	Munich, West Germany	8 September 1972

== Results ==
=== Round 1 ===
Qual. rule: first 4 of each heat (Q) qualified.

==== Heat 1 ====
Rank	Athlete	Nation	Time	Notes
1	Tatyana Anisimova	Soviet Union	12.98	Q
2	Grażyna Rabsztyn	Poland	13.09	Q
3	Sharon Colyear	Great Britain	13.18	Q
4	Nadine Prévost	France	13.70	Q
5	Patrice Donnelly	United States	13.71	
6	Julie Gomis	Senegal	14.57	
—N/a	Miriama Tuisorisori	Fiji	DNS	

==== Heat 2 ====
Rank	Athlete	Nation	Time	Notes
1	Bożena Nowakowska	Poland	13.05	Q
2	Ileana Ongar	Italy	13.37	Q
3	Annelie Ehrhardt	East Germany	13.49	Q
4	Deby LaPlante	United States	13.51	Q
5	Gaye Dell	Australia	13.68	
6	Sue Bradley-Kameli	Canada	14.07	

==== Heat 3 ====
Rank	Athlete	Nation	Time	Notes
1	Natalya Lebedeva	Soviet Union	12.94	Q
2	Johanna Schaller	East Germany	13.02	Q
3	Penka Sokolova	Bulgaria	13.52	Q
4	Lorna Boothe	Great Britain	13.69	Q
5	Rhonda Brady	United States	13.84	
—N/a	Anne-Marie Pira	Belgium	DNS	

==== Heat 4 ====
Rank	Athlete	Nation	Time	Notes
1	Gudrun Berend	East Germany	13.03	Q
2	Esther Roth-Shahamorov	Israel	13.06	Q
3	Lyubov Kononova	Soviet Union	13.36	Q
4	Valeria Bufanu	Romania	13.60	Q
5	Edith Noeding	Peru	14.14	
6	Lucía Vaamonde	Venezuela	19.17	

=== Semifinals ===
Qual. rule: first 4 of each heat (Q) qualified.

==== Heat 1 ====
Rank	Athlete	Nation	Time	Notes
1	Johanna Schaller	East Germany	12.93	Q
2	Gudrun Berend	East Germany	12.96	Q
3	Natalya Lebedeva	Soviet Union	13.03	Q
4	Esther Roth-Shahamorov	Israel	13.04	Q
5	Bożena Nowakowska	Poland	13.04	
6	Deby LaPlante	United States	13.36	
7	Penka Sokolova	Bulgaria	13.67	
8	Lorna Boothe	Great Britain	13.73	

==== Heat 2 ====
Rank	Athlete	Nation	Time	Notes
1	Tatyana Anisimova	Soviet Union	13.08	Q
2	Grażyna Rabsztyn	Poland	13.35	Q
3	Ileana Ongar	Italy	13.41	Q
4	Valeria Bufanu	Romania	13.59	Q
5	Annelie Ehrhardt	East Germany	13.71	
6	Nadine Prévost	France	13.95	
7	Sharon Colyear	Great Britain	17.32	
—N/a	Lyubov Kononova	Soviet Union	DNS	

=== Final ===
Rank	Athlete	Nation	Time	Notes
1st place, gold medalist(s)	Johanna Schaller	East Germany	12.77	
2nd place, silver medalist(s)	Tatyana Anisimova	Soviet Union	12.78	
3rd place, bronze medalist(s)	Natalya Lebedeva	Soviet Union	12.80	
4	Gudrun Berend	East Germany	12.82	
5	Grażyna Rabsztyn	Poland	12.96	
6	Esther Roth-Shahamorov	Israel	13.04	
7	Valeria Bufanu	Romania	13.35	
8	Ileana Ongar	Italy	13.51	
