= 1970 European Athletics Indoor Championships – Women's 60 metres hurdles =

The women's 60 metres hurdles event at the 1970 European Athletics Indoor Championships was held on 14 and 15 March in Vienna.

== Medalists ==
Gold	Silver	Bronze
Karin Balzer; East Germany	Lia Khitrina; Soviet Union	Teresa Sukniewicz; Poland

== Results ==
=== Heats ===
Held on 14 March

First 4 from each heat (Q) qualified directly for the semifinals.

Rank	Heat	Name	Nationality	Time	Notes
1	1	Karin Balzer	East Germany	8.3	Q
2	1	Mary Peters	Great Britain	8.5	Q
3	1	Meta Antenen	Switzerland	8.5	Q
4	1	Ivanka Koshnicharska	Bulgaria	8.7	Q
5	1	Emina Pilav	Yugoslavia	8.7	
1	2	Lia Khitrina	Soviet Union	8.2	Q
2	2	Mieke Sterk	Netherlands	8.5	Q
3	2	Teresa Nowak	Poland	8.5	Q
4	2	Milena Piačková	Czechoslovakia	8.6	Q
5	2	Katalin Balogh	Hungary	8.7	
1	3	Teresa Sukniewicz	Poland	8.6	Q
2	3	Heide Rosendahl	West Germany	8.6	Q
3	3	Valeria Bufanu	Romania	9.2	Q
4	3	Christa Knöppel	Austria	9.3	Q

=== Semifinals ===
Held on 14 March

First 3 from each heat (Q) qualified directly for the final.

Rank	Heat	Name	Nationality	Time	Notes
1	1	Lia Khitrina	Soviet Union	8.3	Q
2	1	Teresa Nowak	Poland	8.5	Q
3	1	Mieke Sterk	Netherlands	8.5	Q
4	1	Mary Peters	Great Britain	8.7	
5	1	Valeria Bufanu	Romania	8.9	
	1	Heide Rosendahl	West Germany	DNS	
1	2	Karin Balzer	East Germany	8.3 (?)	Q
2	2	Teresa Sukniewicz	Poland	8.5	Q
3	2	Ivanka Koshnicharska	Bulgaria	8.7	Q
4	2	Milena Piačková	Czechoslovakia	8.7	
5	2	Meta Antenen	Switzerland	8.7	
6	2	Christa Knöppel	Austria	9.2	

=== Final ===
Held on 15 March

Rank	Lane	Name	Nationality	Time	Notes
1st place, gold medalist(s)	4	Karin Balzer	East Germany	8.2	WB
2nd place, silver medalist(s)	6	Lia Khitrina	Soviet Union	8.2	WB
3rd place, bronze medalist(s)	5	Teresa Sukniewicz	Poland	8.5	
4	2	Teresa Nowak	Poland	8.5	
5	3	Mieke Sterk	Netherlands	8.6	
6	1	Ivanka Koshnicharska	Bulgaria	8.6	
