= 1979 European Athletics Indoor Championships – Women's 60 metres hurdles =

The women's 60 metres hurdles event at the 1979 European Athletics Indoor Championships was held on 24 February in Vienna.

== Medalists ==
Gold	Silver	Bronze
Danuta Perka; Poland	Grażyna Rabsztyn; Poland	Nina Morgulina; Soviet Union

== Results ==
=== Heats ===
First 3 from each heat (Q) and the next 6 fastest (q) qualified for the semifinals.

Rank	Heat	Name	Nationality	Time	Notes
1	1	Grażyna Rabsztyn	Poland	8.08	Q
2	3	Nina Morgulina	Soviet Union	8.14	Q
3	2	Danuta Perka	Poland	8.17	Q
4	3	Sylvia Kempin	East Germany	8.20	Q, SB
5	3	Margit Bartkowiak	East Germany	8.21	q, PB
6	2	Tatyana Anisimova	Soviet Union	8.24	Q
7	1	Vera Komisova	Soviet Union	8.25	Q
8	2	Doris Baum	West Germany	8.30	q
9	1	Xénia Siska	Hungary	8.38	q
10	1	Roswitha Riechardt	West Germany	8.42	q, PB
11	2	Lena Spoof	Finland	8.46	q
12	1	Hilde Fredriksen	Norway	8.53	q, PB
13	3	Petra Prenner	Austria	8.91	SB

=== Semifinals ===
First 3 from each heat (Q) qualified directly for the final.

Rank	Heat	Name	Nationality	Time	Notes
1	1	Grażyna Rabsztyn	Poland	7.96	Q
2	2	Danuta Perka	Poland	8.02	Q
3	2	Nina Morgulina	Soviet Union	8.12	Q
4	2	Tatyana Anisimova	Soviet Union	8.15	Q
5	1	Vera Komisova	Soviet Union	8.19	Q
6	1	Margit Bartkowiak	East Germany	8.23	Q
7	2	Doris Baum	West Germany	8.26	PB
8	1	Sylvia Kempin	East Germany	8.28	
9	2	Xénia Siska	Hungary	8.37	SB
10	1	Lena Spoof	Finland	8.45	PB
11	1	Roswitha Riechardt	West Germany	8.46	
12	2	Hilde Fredriksen	Norway	8.57	

=== Final ===
Rank	Name	Nationality	Time	Notes
1st place, gold medalist(s)	Danuta Perka	Poland	7.95	PB
2nd place, silver medalist(s)	Grażyna Rabsztyn	Poland	8.00	
3rd place, bronze medalist(s)	Nina Morgulina	Soviet Union	8.09	SB
4	Vera Komisova	Soviet Union	8.13	SB
5	Tatyana Anisimova	Soviet Union	8.14	PB
6	Margit Bartkowiak	East Germany	8.22	
