= 1973 European Athletics Indoor Championships – Women's 60 metres hurdles =

Athletic competition

The women's 60 metres hurdles event at the 1973 European Athletics Indoor Championships was held on 10 March in Rotterdam.

== Medalists ==
Gold	Silver	Bronze
Anneliese Ehrhardt; East Germany	Valeria Bufanu; Romania	Teresa Nowak; Poland

== Results ==
=== Heats ===
First 4 from each heat (Q) qualified directly for the semifinals.

Rank	Heat	Name	Nationality	Time	Notes
1	2	Anneliese Ehrhardt	East Germany	8.06	Q, WB
2	3	Teresa Nowak	Poland	8.24	Q
3	2	Meta Antenen	Switzerland	8.30	Q, NR
4	2	Ilona Bruzsenyák	Hungary	8.34	Q
5	1	Valeria Bufanu	Romania	8.42	Q
6	3	Mieke van Wissen	Netherlands	8.46	Q
7	1	Carmen Mähr	Austria	8.48	Q
8	1	Jacqueline André	France	8.48	Q
9	3	Judy Vernon	Great Britain	8.49	Q
10	3	Elfriede Meierholz	West Germany	8.51	Q
11	1	Uta Nolte	West Germany	8.53	Q
11	2	Ivanka Koshnicharska	Bulgaria	8.53	Q
13	1	Grażyna Rabsztyn	Poland	8.54	
14	2	Marlies Koschinski	West Germany	8.66	
15	1	Nedyalka Angelova	Bulgaria	8.69	
16	3	Gunhild Olsson	Sweden	8.94	

=== Semifinals ===
First 3 from each heat (Q) qualified directly for the final.

Rank	Heat	Name	Nationality	Time	Notes
1	1	Anneliese Ehrhardt	East Germany	8.07	Q
2	2	Teresa Nowak	Poland	8.23	Q
3	2	Meta Antenen	Switzerland	8.30	Q, NR
4	1	Valeria Bufanu	Romania	8.32	Q
5	1	Ilona Bruzsenyák	Hungary	8.34	Q
6	1	Uta Nolte	West Germany	8.39	
7	1	Mieke van Wissen	Netherlands	8.40	
8	2	Jacqueline André	France	8.43	Q
9	2	Judy Vernon	Great Britain	8.46	
10	1	Ivanka Koshnicharska	Bulgaria	8.48	
11	2	Elfriede Meierholz	West Germany	8.52	
12	2	Carmen Mähr	Austria	8.58	

=== Final ===
Rank	Name	Nationality	Time	Notes
1st place, gold medalist(s)	Anneliese Ehrhardt	East Germany	8.02	WB
2nd place, silver medalist(s)	Valeria Bufanu	Romania	8.16	NR
3rd place, bronze medalist(s)	Teresa Nowak	Poland	8.23	
4	Meta Antenen	Switzerland	8.27	NR
5	Ilona Bruzsenyák	Hungary	8.32	
6	Jacqueline André	France	8.48	
