= 1969 European Athletics Championships – Women's 100 metres hurdles =

Women's 100 metres hurdles at the European Athletics Championships

The women's 100 metres hurdles at the 1969 European Athletics Championships was held in Athens, Greece, at Georgios Karaiskakis Stadium on 18, 19, and 20 September 1969.

== Medalists ==
Gold	Karin Balzer; East Germany
Silver	Bärbel Podeswa; East Germany
Bronze	Teresa Nowak; Poland

== Results ==
=== Final ===
20 September Wind: -1.0 m/s

Rank	Lane	Name	Nationality	Time	Notes
1st place, gold medalist(s)	1	Karin Balzer	East Germany	13.29	CR
2nd place, silver medalist(s)	4	Bärbel Podeswa	East Germany	13.68	
3rd place, bronze medalist(s)	5	Teresa Nowak	Poland	13.77	
4	7	Lia Khitrina	Soviet Union	13.86	
5	3	Teresa Sukniewicz	Poland	13.89	
6	6	Regina Höfer	East Germany	13.96	
7	2	Christine Perera	Great Britain	14.03	
8	8	Sirkka Norrlund	Finland	14.16	

=== Semi-finals ===
19 September

==== Semi-final 1 ====
Wind: -1.9 m/s

Rank	Name	Nationality	Time	Notes
1	Teresa Nowak	Poland	13.7	CR Q
2	Bärbel Podeswa	East Germany	13.7	CR Q
3	Lia Khitrina	Soviet Union	13.7	CR Q
4	Christine Perera	Great Britain	14.1	Q
5	Marlène Canguio	France	14.1	
6	Milena Piackova	Czechoslovakia	14.5	
7	Emina Pilav	Yugoslavia	14.8	
	Gun Olsson	Sweden	DNS	

==== Semi-final 2 ====
Wind: -1.7 m/s

Rank	Name	Nationality	Time	Notes
1	Karin Balzer	East Germany	13.5	CR Q
2	Regina Höfer	East Germany	13.8	Q
3	Teresa Sukniewicz	Poland	14.0	Q
4	Sirkka Norrlund	Finland	14.0	Q
5	Jeanne Schoebel	France	14.1	
6	Susan Hayward	Great Britain	14.1	
7	Magaly Vettorazzo	Italy	14.8	
	Eva Kucmanová	Czechoslovakia	DNS	

=== Heats ===
18 September

==== Heat 1 ====
Wind: -1.7 m/s

Rank	Name	Nationality	Time	Notes
1	Lia Khitrina	Soviet Union	13.7	CR Q
2	Teresa Sukniewicz	Poland	13.9	Q
3	Jeanne Schoebel	France	14.1	Q
4	Magaly Vettorazzo	Italy	14.7	Q

==== Heat 2 ====
Wind: -2.6 m/s

Rank	Name	Nationality	Time	Notes
1	Teresa Nowak	Poland	14.1	Q
2	Milena Piackova	Czechoslovakia	14.3	Q
3	Sirkka Norrlund	Finland	14.3	Q
4	Regina Höfer	East Germany	14.4	Q
5	Anne Van Rensbergen	Belgium	14.6	

==== Heat 3 ====
Wind: -4.1 m/s

Rank	Name	Nationality	Time	Notes
1	Bärbel Podeswa	East Germany	14.0	Q
2	Susan Hayward	Great Britain	14.3	Q
3	Eva Kucmanová	Czechoslovakia	14.7	Q
4	Emina Pilav	Yugoslavia	14.9	Q
5	Charoula Sasagianni	Greece	15.9	

==== Heat 4 ====
Wind: -3.1 m/s

Rank	Name	Nationality	Time	Notes
1	Karin Balzer	East Germany	14.0	Q
2	Marlène Canguio	France	14.4	Q
3	Christine Perera	Great Britain	14.4	Q
4	Gun Olsson	Sweden	14.7	Q

== Participation ==
According to an unofficial count, 18 athletes from 12 countries participated in the event.

- Belgium (1)
- Czechoslovakia (2)
- East Germany (3)
- Finland (1)
- France (2)
- Greece (1)
- Italy (1)
- Poland (2)
- Soviet Union (1)
- Sweden (1)
- Great Britain (2)
- Yugoslavia (1)
