= Athletics at the 1975 Summer Universiade – Women's 4 × 100 metres relay =

The women's 4 × 100 metres relay event at the 1975 Summer Universiade was held at the Stadio Olimpico in Rome on 21 September.

== Results ==
| Rank | Nation | Athletes | Time | Notes |
|---|---|---|---|---|
| 1st place, gold medalist(s) | Soviet Union | Inta Kļimoviča, Tatyana Anisimova, Marina Sidorova, Lyudmila Zharkova | 44.77 | |
| 2nd place, silver medalist(s) | POL | Ewa Długołęcka, Aniela Szubert, Barbara Bakulin, Grażyna Rabsztyn | 44.87 | |
| 3rd place, bronze medalist(s) | France | Cécile Cachera, Danielle Camus, Jacqueline Curtet, Rose-Aimée Bacoul | 45.88 | |
| 4 | Italy | Rita Bottiglieri, Cecilia Molinari, Laura Nappi, Ileana Ongar | 46.09 | |
| 5 | Brazil | Maria da Silva, Viviane Nouailhetas-Simon, Valdéa Chagas, Marilene Eberhardt | 49.36 | |
| 6 | Great Britain | Jackie Stokoe, Valerie Harrison, Christine Benning, Paula Lloyd | 50.29 | |
