= 1976 European Athletics Indoor Championships – Women's 60 metres hurdles =

The women's 60 metres hurdles event at the 1976 European Athletics Indoor Championships was held on 21 February in Munich.

== Medalists ==
Gold	Silver	Bronze
Grażyna Rabsztyn; Poland	Natalya Lebedeva; Soviet Union	Bożena Nowakowska; Poland

== Results ==
=== Heats ===
First 3 from each heat (Q) qualified directly for the final.

Rank	Heat	Name	Nationality	Time	Notes
1	2	Bożena Nowakowska	Poland	8.09	Q
2	1	Lyubov Kononova	Soviet Union	8.14	Q
3	1	Grażyna Rabsztyn	Poland	8.15	Q
4	2	Natalya Lebedeva	Soviet Union	8.16	Q
5	1	Ursula Schalück	West Germany	8.25	Q
6	1	Chantal Réga	France	8.40	
7	2	Teresa Nowak	Poland	8.46	Q
8	1	Lidiya Gusheva	Bulgaria	8.53	
9	2	Meta Antenen	Switzerland	8.59	
10	1	Monika Schönauerová	Czechoslovakia	8.68	

=== Final ===
Rank	Name	Nationality	Time	Notes
1st place, gold medalist(s)	Grażyna Rabsztyn	Poland	7.96	CR, NR
2nd place, silver medalist(s)	Natalya Lebedeva	Soviet Union	8.08	
3rd place, bronze medalist(s)	Bożena Nowakowska	Poland	8.14	
4	Ursula Schalück	West Germany	8.23	
5	Teresa Nowak	Poland	8.44	
6	Lyubov Kononova	Soviet Union	8.49	
