= Karin Balzer =

East German hurdler (1938–2019)

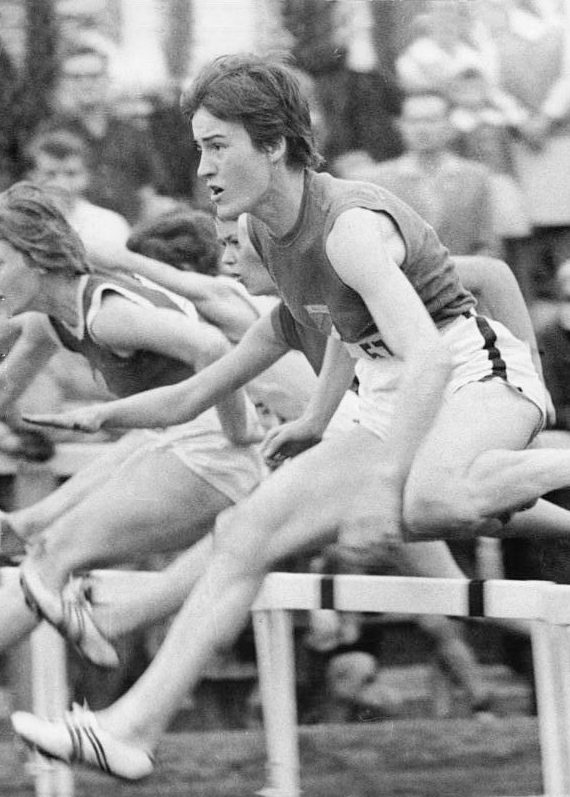
- Karin Balzer at the East German track and field athletics Olympic preselections in Halle an der Saale in October 1963

Personal information
- Born: 5 June 1938 Magdeburg, Germany
- Died: 17 December 2019 (aged 81)
- Height: 1.71 m (5 ft 7 in)
- Weight: 64 kg (141 lb)

Sport
- Sport: Athletics
- Event: 80, 100 m hurdles
- Club: SC DHfK; SC Leipzig

Achievements and titles
- Personal bests: 80 mH – 10.61 (1968); 100 mH – 12.6 (1971)
Medal record
Women's athletics
Representing Germany
Olympic Games
Gold medal – first place	1964 Tokyo	80 m hurdles
Representing East Germany
Olympic Games
Bronze medal – third place	1972 Munich	100 m hurdles
European Championships
Gold medal – first place	1966 Budapest	80 m hurdles
Gold medal – first place	1969 Athens	100 m hurdles
Gold medal – first place	1971 Helsinki	100 m hurdles
Silver medal – second place	1962 Belgrade	80 m hurdles
Silver medal – second place	1971 Helsinki	4×100 m
European Indoor Championships
Gold medal – first place	1970 Vienna	60 m hurdles
Gold medal – first place	1971 Sofia	60 m hurdles

Karin Balzer (née Richert; 5 June 1938 – 17 December 2019) was an East German hurdler who competed in the 80 m hurdles event at the 1960, 1964 and 1968 Olympics, and in the 100 m hurdles in 1972. She won a gold medal in 1964 and a bronze in 1972, while finishing fifth in 1968. During her career she set 37 world's best performances.

== Biography ==
She was born Karin Richert in Magdeburg, and competed in several track and field events in her teens. She showed her best results in the 80 m hurdles and qualified for the 1960 Summer Olympics. The United Team of Germany then included athletes of both East and West Germany. She finished fourth in her Olympic semifinal and narrowly missed the final.

The following year, she married her coach, retired pole vaulter, Karl-Heinz Balzer. Some years earlier, they had briefly fled the DDR, but had returned weeks later. Now competing as Karin Balzer, she won her first international medal, silver, at the 1962 European Athletics Championships. In 1964, she tied the world record in the hurdles during a pentathlon competition. Despite showing good results she never competed in pentathlon at major meets.

At the Tokyo Olympics that same year, she placed first in the final of the 80 m hurdles. In a close finish, the first three runners all timed 10.5 seconds, equal to the world record (although the record was not ratified due to a wind). Electronic timing showed Balzer had beaten the two other medalists by one and two hundredths of a second, respectively.

Two years later, Balzer won a second title at the 1966 European Athletics Championships, and then placed fifth in the 1968 Olympic final; she was the Olympic flag bearer for East Germany at those Games. That was the last major event in which the high hurdles were run over 80 m; from 1969 on, the event became the 100 m. Balzer set the inaugural world record in that event, in June 1969, then subsequently lowered it twice during that same year. She also successfully defended her European title in Athens, which she repeated in Helsinki in 1971. That year she was voted German Sportspersonality of the Year.

While in training for the 1972 Summer Olympics in Munich, Balzer's son, Andreas was involved in an accident, and was comatised. He died the day before the final of the 100 m hurdles, but her husband did not tell her until after the race, in which she won her second Olympic medal, bronze. Balzer's second son, Falk Balzer (born 1973) also became a hurdler. His best achievement was a second place in the 110 m hurdles at the 1998 European Championships.

Balzer was trained as a chemist, and worked as a lab technician from 1955 to 1961. From 1961 until 1976 she was a sports school teacher in Frankfurt and then in Leipzig. In parallel, from 1970 to 1976 she studied at Deutsche Hochschule für Körperkultur (DHfK) and earned a degree in physical education, and from 1973 to 1976 coached athletics at SC Leipzig together with her husband. They were suspended in 1976 after refusing to administer anabolic steroids to their trainees, and moved to Dresden, where Balzer worked as a school teacher through the 1970s and 80s. From 1991 to 1993 she lectured at the BAW Saxony, and from 1994 to 1997 at the Cologne business school. In 1997 Karin and Karl Balzer were reinstated as athletics coaches. Karl died in 2007.

Records
Preceded by (Poland) Teresa Sukniewicz	Women's 100 m Hurdles World Record Holder; 20 June 1969 – 20 June 1970	Succeeded by (Poland) Teresa Sukniewicz
Preceded by (Poland) Teresa Sukniewicz	Women's 100 m Hurdles World Record Holder; 26 July 1970 – 28 June 1972	Succeeded by (Australia) Pam Ryan
Awards and achievements
Preceded by (East Germany) Erika Zuchold	East German Sportswoman of the Year; 1971	Succeeded by (East Germany) Karin Janz
Sporting positions
Preceded by (Taiwan) Chi Cheng	Women's 100 m Hurdles Best Year Performance; 1971	Succeeded by (East Germany) Anneliese Ehrhardt
