= Grażyna Rabsztyn =

Polish hurdler (born 1952)

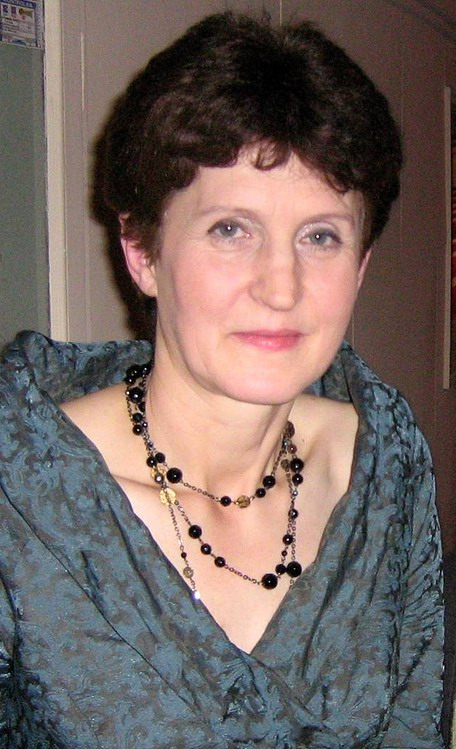
- Grażyna Rabsztyn in 2007

Personal information
- Nationality: Polish
- Born: 20 September 1952 (age 73) Wrocław, Poland

Sport
- Sport: Track and field
- Events: 60 m hurdles, 100 m hurdles
Medal record
Women's athletics
Representing Poland
European Indoor Championships
Gold medal – first place	1975 Katowice	60 m hurdles
Gold medal – first place	1976 Munich	60 m hurdles
Silver medal – second place	1978 Milan	60 m hurdles
Silver medal – second place	1974 Gothenburg	60 m hurdles
Silver medal – second place	1979 Vienna	60 m hurdles
Silver medal – second place	1980 Sindelfingen	60 m hurdles
Bronze medal – third place	1972 Grenoble	60 m hurdles
Summer Universiade
Gold medal – first place	1973 Moscow	100m hurdles
Gold medal – first place	1975 Rome	100m hurdles
Gold medal – first place	1977 Sofia	100m hurdles
Silver medal – second place	1975 Rome	4x100m relay
Representing Europe
IAAF World Cup
Gold medal – first place	1977 Düsseldorf	100 m hurdles
Gold medal – first place	1979 Montreal	100 m hurdles

Grażyna Józefa Rabsztyn (Polish pronunciation: [ɡraˈʐɨna ˈrapʂtɨn]; born September 20, 1952, in Wrocław) is a retired Polish hurdler. She represented her country at the Summer Olympics on three occasions (1972–1980) and was a finalist each time (twice placing fifth).

Rabsztyn set three world records in 100 m hurdles. On June 10, 1978, she became the first runner under 12.5 seconds with a new record of 12.48 seconds. She had the same time a year later, on June 18, 1979, and finally, on June 13, 1980, she had her best time ever, 12.36 seconds. Her world record was matched and later beaten by Yordanka Donkova. Rabsztyn's then world record time gives her the eleventh place in the all-time list of 100 m hurdlers. Her personal best remains the Polish record for the event

Rabsztyn never won an outdoor Olympic, World or European medal. She did, however, win several medals at indoor competitions. She was a two-time 60 metres hurdles champion at the European Athletics Indoor Championships and was silver medallist in the event on four more occasions. Rabsztyn won three consecutive titles in the 100 m hurdles at the Summer Universiade from 1973 to 1977 and two straight titles at the IAAF World Cup (1977 and 1979).

== Competition record ==
Year	Competition	Venue	Position	Event	Notes
Representing Poland
1970	European Junior Championships	Paris, France	1st	100 m hurdles	14.06
1971	European Indoor Championships	Sofia, Bulgaria	7th (sf)	60 m hurdles	8.5
1972	European Indoor Championships	Grenoble, France	3rd	50 m hurdles	7.05
1972	Olympic Games	Munich, West Germany	8th	100 m hurdles	13.44
1973	European Indoor Championships	Rotterdam, Netherlands	13th (h)	60 m hurdles	8.54
1973	Universiade	Moscow, Soviet Union	1st	100 m hurdles	13.23
1974	European Indoor Championships	Gothenburg, Sweden	2nd	60 m hurdles	8.08
1974	European Championships	Rome, Italy	8th	100 m hurdles	13.53
1975	European Indoor Championships	Katowice, Poland	1st	60 m hurdles	8.04
1975	Universiade	Rome, Italy	1st	100 m hurdles	13.14
1975	Universiade	Rome, Italy	2nd	4 × 100 m relay	44.87
1976	European Indoor Championships	Munich, West Germany	1st	60 m hurdles	7.96
1976	Olympic Games	Montreal, Canada	5th	100 m hurdles	12.96
1977	Universiade	Sofia, Bulgaria	1st	100 m hurdles	12.86
1977	World Cup	Düsseldorf, West Germany	1st	100 m hurdles	12.70^{1}
1978	European Indoor Championships	Milan, Italy	2nd	60 m hurdles	8.07
1978	European Championships	Prague, Czechoslovakia	1st (sf)	100 m hurdles	12.60^{2}
1978	European Championships	Prague, Czechoslovakia	5th	4 × 100 m relay	43.83
1979	European Indoor Championships	Vienna, Austria	12th (sf)	60 m	7.44
1979	European Indoor Championships	Vienna, Austria	2nd	60 m hurdles	8.00
1979	World Cup	Montreal, Canada	1st	100 m hurdles	12.67^{1}
1980	European Indoor Championships	Sindelfingen, West Germany	9th (sf)	60 m	7.40
1980	European Indoor Championships	Sindelfingen, West Germany	2nd	60 m hurdles	7.89
1980	Olympic Games	Moscow, Soviet Union	5th	100 m hurdles	12.74
1980	Olympic Games	Moscow, Soviet Union	7th	4 × 100 m relay	44.49
1982	European Indoor Championships	Milan, Italy	5th	60 m hurdles	8.21

^{1}Representing Europe
^{2}Did not finish in the final

Sporting positions
Preceded by Bożena Świerczyńska; Lyubov Kononova	Women's 100m Hurdles Best Year Performance; 1976; 1978–1980	Succeeded by Lyubov Kononova; Tatyana Anisimova
