= Danuta Perka =

Polish hurdler

Personal information
- Born: 22 June 1956 (age 70) Korsze, Poland

Sport
- Sport: Track and field
Medal record
Representing Poland
European Indoor Championships
Gold medal – first place	1979 Vienna	100 m hurdles
Summer Universiade
Silver medal – second place	1979 Mexico City	100 m hurdles

Danuta Perka (née Wołosz; born 22 June 1956) is a Polish female former track and field hurdler who specialised in the 100 metres hurdles. She was a two-time national champion in the 60 metres hurdles, winning the Polish title in 1977 and 1983.

From Korsze, she was a highly ranked athlete during her career, placing within the season's top ten hurdlers based on time between 1977 and 1981. Her personal best of 12.65 seconds came in Mexico City in 1979. She was a member of Gwardia Warsaw during her career. Perka changed her competitive name after marrying fellow athlete Wlodzimierz Perka.

Perka competed when Polish athletes were prominent in hurdling; she took the 60 metres hurdles gold medal at the 1979 European Athletics Indoor Championships ahead of compatriot and former champion Grażyna Rabsztyn, while at the 1979 Summer Universiade she was runner-up to fellow Pole Lucyna Langer in the 100 m hurdles. As of 2017, her time of 12.66 remained the fastest ever non-winning time at the competition and the fourth fastest of any finalist, after Langer, Monique Éwanjé-Épée and Vashti Thomas. She was the B Final winner of the hurdles at the 1981 European Cup.

== International competitions ==
Year	Competition	Venue	Position	Event	Notes
1977	European Indoor Championships	San Sebastián, Spain	5th	60 m hurdles	8.42
1979	European Indoor Championships	Vienna, Austria	1st	60 m hurdles	7.95
1979	Universiade	Mexico City, Mexico	2nd	100 m hurdles	12.66
1981	European Cup B Final	Pescara, Italy	1st	100 m hurdles	13.12

== National titles ==
- Polish Indoor Athletics Championships
  - 60 m hurdles: 1977, 1983

== See also ==
- List of European Athletics Indoor Championships medalists (women)
