= Karin Margareta Olsson =

Swedish bobsledder

Karin Margareta Olsson (born 6 August 1975 in Klippan) is a Swedish bobsledder who has competed since 2000. Her best Bobsleigh World Cup finish was 10th in the two-woman event at Cortina in January 2008.

Olsson also finished 16th in the two-woman event at the 2008 FIBT World Championships in Altenberg. She also competed at the 2002 Winter Olympics.

Olympic sprinter Gunhild Olsson is her mother.
