= Julie Gomis =

Senegalese hurdler

Personal information
- Nationality: Senegalese
- Born: 7 May 1952 (age 74)

Sport
- Sport: Track and field
- Event: 100 metres hurdles
Medal record
Women's athletics
Representing Senegal
African Championships
| Bronze medal – third place | 1979 Dakar | Pentathlon |

Julie Marie Gomis N’Diaye (born 7 May 1952) is a Senegalese hurdler. She competed in the women's 100 metres hurdles at the 1976 Summer Olympics. She was the first female Senegalese athlete to participate at the Olympics.
