= Gudrun Berend =

East German hurdler

Medal record

Women's athletics

Representing East Germany

European Championships
Bronze medal – third place	1978 Prague	100 m hurdles

Gudrun Berend, married Wakan, (27 April 1955 in Eisleben – 22 August 2011 in Eisleben) was an East German hurdler. She represented the sports team SC Chemie Halle.

She finished fifth at the 1974 European Championships, fourth at the 1976 Summer Olympics and won the bronze medal at the 1978 European Championships, the latter in a lifetime best of 12.73 seconds.

Her personal best time of 12.73 seconds ranks her tenth among German 100 m hurdlers, behind Bettine Jahn, Gloria Uibel, Cornelia Oschkenat, Kerstin Knabe, Sabine Paetz, Johanna Klier, Annelie Ehrhardt, Kirsten Bolm and Heike Theele.
