= Johanna Klier =

East German hurdler

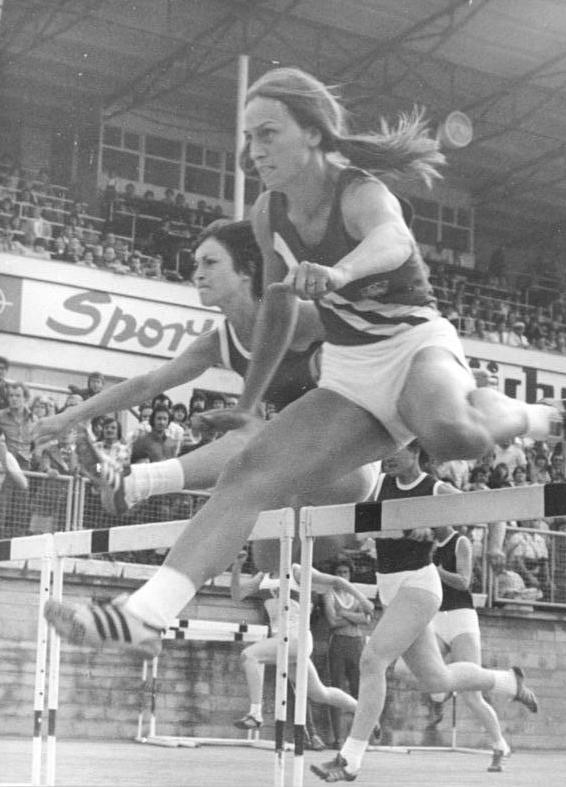
- Schaller-Klier in 1977

Medal record

Women's athletics

Representing East Germany

European Championships
Gold medal – first place	1978 Prague	100 m hurdles
Bronze medal – third place	1978 Prague	4×100 m

European Indoor Championships
Gold medal – first place	1978 Milan	60 m hurdles

Johanna Klier (née Schaller, also known as Schaller-Klier, born 13 September 1952) is a former East German hurdler and Olympic gold medallist.

Under her maiden name, she won the gold medal at the 1976 Summer Olympics in the 100 m hurdles. Under her married name, she won the silver medal 1980 Summer Olympics in Moscow, again in the 100 m hurdles.

In 1976–78, and 1980 she was East German champion, also winning indoors in 1978 in the 60 hurdles. At the 1977 World Cup Schaller was runner-up, but she won gold at the 1978 European Championships in the high hurdles, adding a bronze with the sprint relay. She also won the 1977 European Cup and the 1978 European Indoors over 60 hurdles.

She married the hurdler Martin Klier on 11 September 1976. Schaller-Klier was educated as a sports teacher and worked at the Pedagogical University of Erfurt / Mulhousen. After German reunification she moved to Landessportbund, Thuringia and worked in the youth department.

== International competitions ==
Year	Competition	Venue	Position	Event	Notes
1976	Olympic Games	Montreal, Canada	1st	100 m hurdles	12.77
1977	World Cup	Düsseldorf, West Germany	2nd	100 m hurdles	12.86
1978	European Indoor Championships	Milan, Italy	1st	60 m hurdles	7.94 CR
1978	European Championships	Prague, Czechoslovakia	1st	100 m hurdles	12.62 CR
1978	European Championships	Prague, Czechoslovakia	3rd	4 × 100 m relay	43.07
1980	Olympic Games	Moscow, Soviet Union	2nd	100 m hurdles	12.63

== See also ==
- List of Olympic medalists in athletics (women)
- List of 1976 Summer Olympics medal winners
- List of European Athletics Championships medalists (women)
- List of European Athletics Indoor Championships medalists (women)
- Sprint hurdles at the Olympics
- Women's 4 × 100 metres relay world record progression
