= Chi Cheng (athlete) =

Taiwanese track and field athlete and Republic of China politician

- 紀政
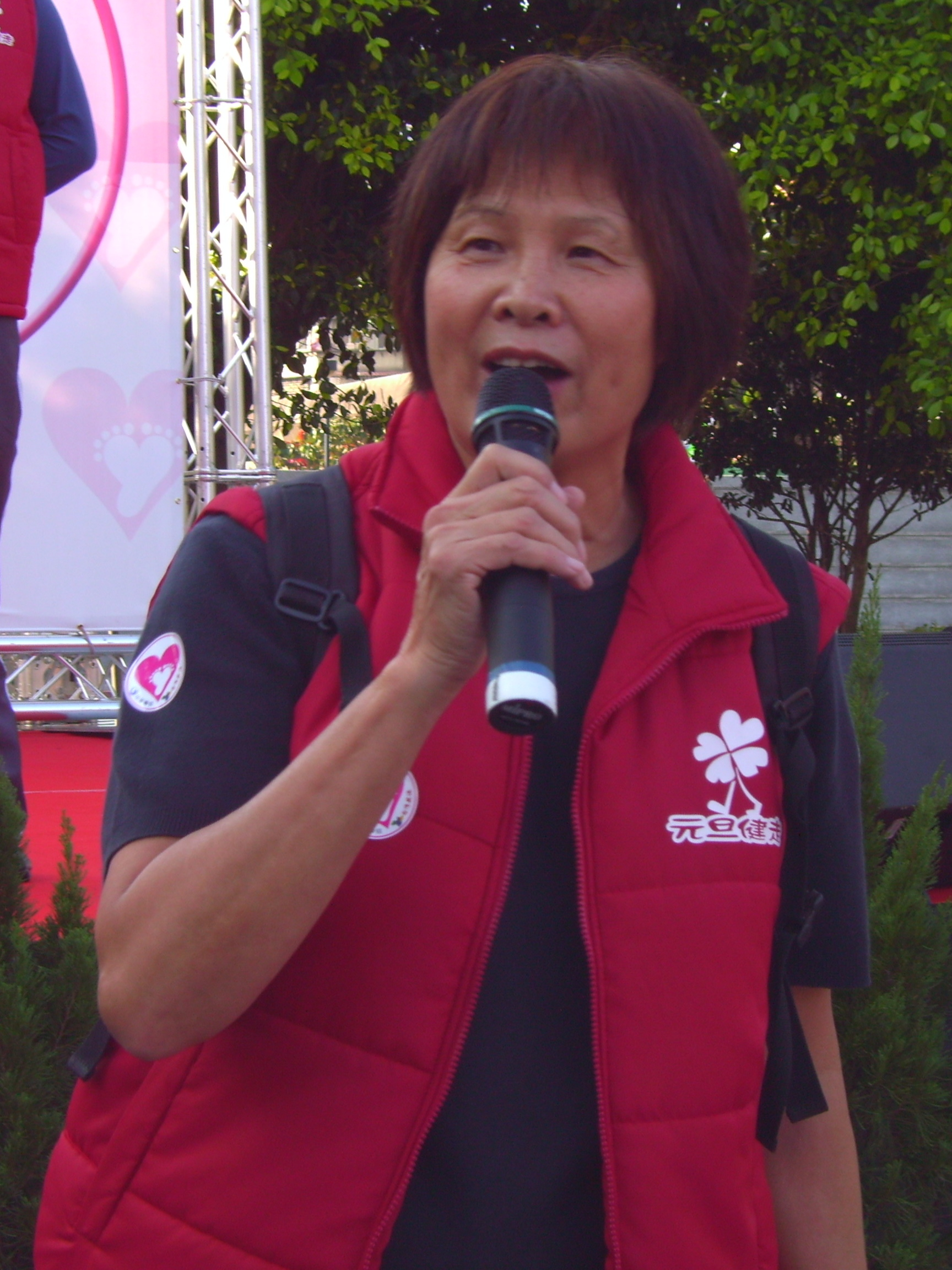

Member of the Legislative Yuan
- In office 1 February 1981 – 1989

Personal details
- Born: March 15, 1944 (age 82) Hsinchu, Japanese Taiwan
- Party: Kuomintang
- Education: California State Polytechnic University, Pomona (BS)
- Sports career
- Nationality: Republic of China
- Sport: Track and field
Medal record
Women's athletics
Representing Taiwan
Olympic Games
Bronze medal – third place	1968 Mexico City	80 m hurdles
Asian Games
Gold medal – first place	1966 Bangkok	Long jump
Gold medal – first place	1970 Bangkok	100 m

Chi Cheng
- Traditional Chinese: 紀政
- Simplified Chinese: 纪政
Transcriptions
Standard Mandarin
- Hanyu Pinyin: Jì Zhèng
- Wade–Giles: Chi Cheng

Chi Cheng (Chinese: 紀政; born March 15, 1944) is a Taiwanese politician and athlete in track and field. She was an Olympic medalist in 1968 and was named the Associated Press Athlete of the Year for 1970. She was a former pentathlete turned sprinter.

== Biography ==
Chi won a Kuomintang scholarship and began her college education at the University of Hawaiʻi, later transferring to California State Polytechnic University, Pomona (Cal Poly Pomona) in Pomona, California, where she received most of her athletic training. As a student there, she won four U.S. national championships and over a two-year period was the winner of 153 of the 154 events she entered. Representing the Republic of China, she ran in the 1960 and 1964 Olympics, then won the bronze medal in the women's 80-meter hurdles in the 1968 Summer Olympics and finished 7th in the 100 metre final.

In 1969, she broke three world records and won the British WAAA Championships titles in two events; the 100 metres and the 100 metres hurdles at the 1969 WAAA Championships.

In 1970, she broke or tied five world records, accomplishing 3 in the space of just one week. She was first woman to run 10.0 second for 100 yards. She also ran world bests of 11.0 for 100 metres, 22.4 for 200 metres, 22.6 for 220 yards, and 12.8 for 100 metre hurdles. She won the gold medal in the 100 metres at the 1970 Asian Games in Bangkok in a games record time. While leading in the 400 metres at the same Asian Games, she suffered a severe leg cramp at 330 metres, which eventually led to a career ending injury. She was ranked number one in the world for 100 metres and 200 metres, second in the 400 metres and third in 100 metres hurdles in 1970 and was undefeated in 69 races that season.

Despite not competing in any high level international championships after 1970, Cheng continued to compete for several years domestically under the name Chi Cheng Reel for the Cal Poly Pomona Broncos track and field team, winning several DGWS national titles. She officially retired in 1973.

For her achievement, Chi Cheng was named the Associated Press Athlete of the Year. Also, she became the Director of Women's Athletics at the University of Redlands, California, from 1974 to 1976.

Chi naturalised as a U.S. citizen, but later returned to Taiwan. She was appointed the Secretary-General of the Republic of China Track and Field Association in 1977. Subsequently, she was chairman until 1993 and board member from 1998 to 1999. Chi won three terms as a member of the Legislative Yuan, serving from 1981 to 1989.

She was appointed a National Policy Advisor by President Ma Ying-jeou in 2009, which required her to renounce her U.S. citizenship in order to take the position. Ma's successor, Tsai Ing-wen, retained Chi as an advisor.

Chi stated in 2018 that Taiwanese people should be allowed to vote for the name under which Taiwanese athletes compete in the 2020 Summer Olympics and future sports events, as Taiwanese as sent delegations to the Olympics since 1984 as Chinese Taipei.

Sporting positions
Preceded by Unknown	Women's 100m Hurdles Best Year Performance; 1970	Succeeded by Karin Balzer
