= Manon Bornholdt =

German long jumper

Personal information
- Nationality: German
- Born: 20 August 1950 (age 75)

Sport
- Sport: Athletics
- Event: Long jump

Manon Bornholdt (born 20 August 1950) is a German athlete. She competed in the women's long jump at the 1968 Summer Olympics.
