= Lena Spoof =

Finnish archaeologist and athletics competitor

- Born: 20 August 1961; Vaasa Finland
- Occupations: archeologist, hurdler
- Years active: 1978-present

Lena Spoof (born August 20, 1961 in Vaasa) is a Finnish athlete, who won the national championship in the 100-meter hurdles four times, the national indoor master's event in the 60-meter hurdles four times and is now an archaeologist doing the first urban dig in Finland.

At the age of 17, she won the 1979 European Athletics Junior Championships in Bydgoszcz with a record of 13.24 s. The result was her personal best Spoof won the 100 meters hurdles in the Finnish championship four times, in 1978, 1979, 1980 and 1982. She also won the 60 meters hurdles in the Indoor Finnish Masters four times, in 1978, 1979, 1980 and 1983.

By training, Spoof is an archaeologist and was the first to evaluate an urban area in Finland at the archaeological site at Old Vaasa.
