= Natalya Lebedeva =

Soviet-Russian hurdler (born 1949)

Personal information
- Native name: Наталья Лебедева
- Born: 24 August 1949 (age 77) Moscow, Russian SFSR, Soviet Union
- Height: 171 cm (5 ft 7 in)
- Weight: 62 kg (137 lb)

Sport
- Country: Soviet Union
- Sport: Athletics
- Event: 100 metres hurdles
- Club: VS Moscow
- Coached by: Zoya Petrova

Achievements and titles
- Personal best: 100 m hurdles: 12.80 (1976)
Medal record
Women's athletics
Representing Soviet Union
Olympic Games
Bronze medal – third place	1976 Montreal	100 m hurdles
World University Games
Bronze medal – third place	1973 Moscow	100 m hurdles
Bronze medal – third place	1977 Sofia	100 m hurdles
European Indoor Championships
Silver medal – second place	1976 Munich	60 m hurdles
Bronze medal – third place	1980 Sindelfingen	60 m hurdles

Natalya Lebedeva (Russian: Наталья Васильевна Лебедева, born 24 August 1949) is a Soviet-Russian retired athlete who competed mainly in the 100 metres hurdles.

She competed for the Soviet Union in the 1976 Summer Olympics held in Montreal, Canada in the 100 metres hurdles where she won the bronze medal.
