= Heidi Schüller =

German long jumper

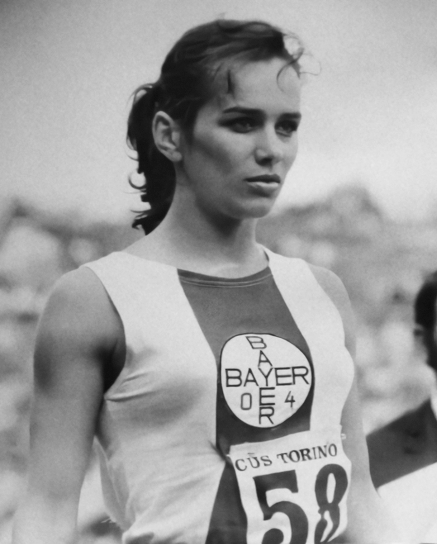
- Heidi Schüller in 1972

Personal information
- Born: 15 June 1950 (age 76) Passau, West Germany

Sport
- Sport: Track and field
Medal record
Representing West Germany
Summer Universiade
Bronze medal – third place	1970 Turin	4x100m relay

Heidi Schüller (born 15 June 1950) is a West German-German long jumper who competed in the early 1970s. She took the Athlete's Oath at the 1972 Summer Olympics in Munich, the first for a woman in the Summer Olympics. Schüller finished fifth in the women's long jump at those same games.

As of 2008, she lives in Aachen.
