= Judy Vernon =

British hurdler and sprinter

Personal information
- Nationality: British (English)
- Born: 25 September 1945 (age 80) St. Louis, Missouri, USA
- Height: 170 cm (5 ft 7 in)
- Weight: 60 kg (132 lb)

Sport
- Sport: Athletics
- Event: hurdles/sprints
- Club: Mitcham AC
Medal record
Women's athletics
Representing England
Commonwealth Games
Gold medal – first place	1974 Christchurch	100 m hurdles
Silver medal – second place	1974 Christchurch	4 × 100 m

Judith Ann 'Judy' Vernon (born 22 September 1945) is a female English former 100 metres hurdler, who competed at the 1972 Summer Olympics.

== Biography ==
Vernon, a member of Mitcham Athletic Club, finished second behind Sharon Colyear in the 200 metres hurdles event at the 1971 WAAA Championships.

At the 1972 Olympics Games in Munich, she represented Great Britain in the women's 100 metres hurdles and in the 4 × 100 metres relay team which finished in 7th place in the final.

Vernon became the British 100 metres hurdles champion after winning the British WAAA Championships title at the 1973 WAAA Championships.

She represented England and won a gold medal in the 100 metres hurdles at the 1974 Commonwealth Games in Christchurch, New Zealand.
