= Danuta Straszyńska =

Polish hurdler and sprinter

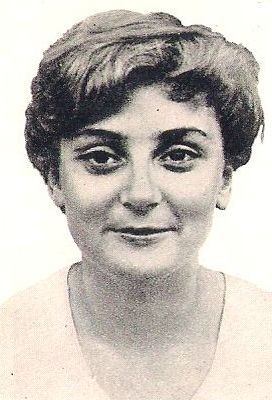

Personal information
- Nationality: Polish
- Born: 4 February 1942 (age 84) Ostrowiec Świętokrzyski, Poland
- Height: 164 cm (5 ft 5 in)
- Weight: 56 kg (123 lb)

Sport
- Sport: Athletics
- Events: hurdling, sprinting
- Club: AZS Kraków
Medal record
Women's athletics
Representing Poland
European Championships
Gold medal – first place	1966 Budapest	4×100 m
Summer Universiade
Gold medal – first place	1965 Budapest	80m hurdles
Silver medal – second place	1965 Budapest	4x100m relay

Danuta Julia Straszyńska (born 4 February 1942) is a Polish former hurdler and sprinter who competed at two Olympic Games.

== Biography ==
Straszyńska won the 80 metres hurdles title at the 1965 Universiade in 10.6 seconds

Straszyńska won the British WAAA Championships title in the 80 metres hurdles event at the 1966 WAAA Championships. She also won a gold medal in the 4 × 100 metres relay at the 1966 European Championships.

She went on to finish sixth in the 80 metres hurdles final at the 1968 Mexico City Olympics in 10.6 seconds and competed in the 100 metres hurdles at the 1972 Olympics Games in Munich.
