= Tatyana Vorokhobko =

Soviet pentathlete

Personal information
- Nationality: Soviet
- Born: 5 December 1950 (age 75) Saint Petersburg, Soviet Union

Sport
- Sport: Athletics
- Event: Pentathlon
Medal record
Women's athletics
Representing Soviet Union
European Indoor Championships
| Gold medal – first place | 1971 Sofia | 4×200 m relay |
Summer Universiade
| Gold medal – first place | 1970 Turin | 4x100m relay |
| Gold medal – first place | 1970 Turin | Pentathlon |
| Silver medal – second place | 1973 Moscow | Pentathlon |

Tatyana Vorokhobko (born 5 December 1950) is a Soviet athlete. She competed in the women's pentathlon at the 1976 Summer Olympics.
