= Margit Bach =

German hurdler

Personal information
- Nationality: German
- Born: 25 March 1951 (age 75) Höchst (Frankfurt am Main), Germany

Sport
- Sport: Track and field
- Event: 100 metres hurdles

Margit Bach (born 25 March 1951) is a German hurdler. She competed in the women's 100 metres hurdles at the 1972 Summer Olympics, representing West Germany.
