= Nadine Prévost =

French hurdler

Personal information
- Nationality: French
- Born: 7 May 1951 (age 75) Sézanne, France

Sport
- Sport: Track and field
- Event: 100 metres hurdles
Medal record
Representing France
Mediterranean Games
Gold medal – first place	1975 Algiers	100m hurdles

Nadine Prévost (née Fricault; born 7 May 1951) is a French hurdler. She competed in the women's 100 metres hurdles at the 1976 Summer Olympics.
