= Patty Van Wolvelaere =

American hurdler (born 1950)

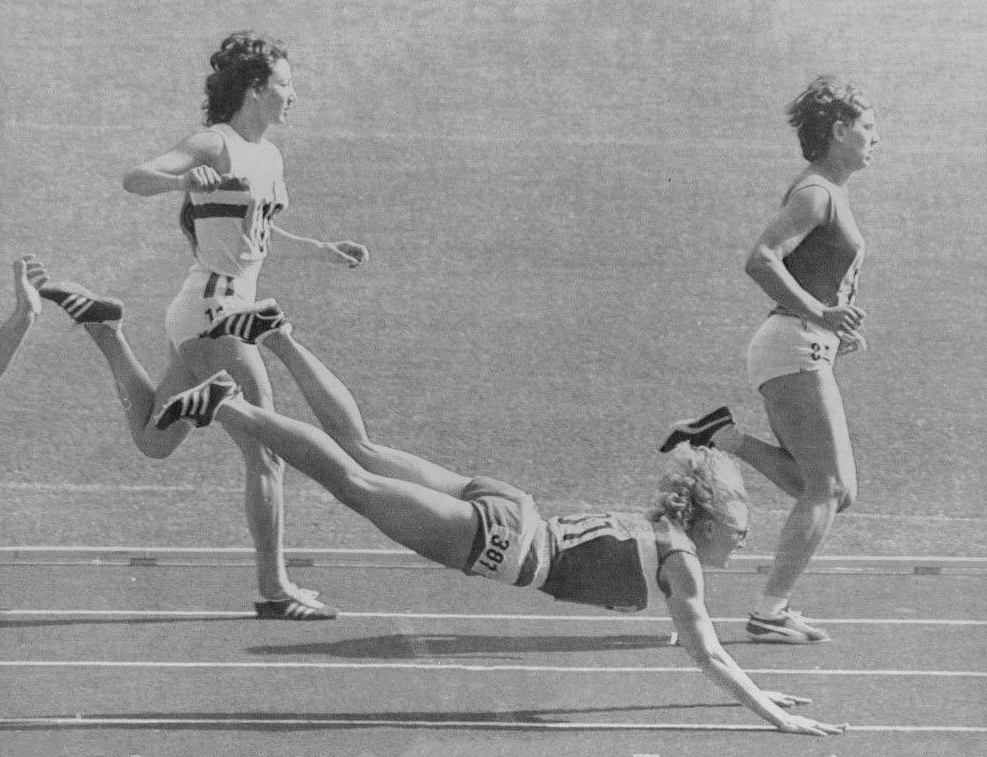
- Van Wolvelaere (center) at the 1972 Olympics

Personal information
- Born: April 15, 1950 (age 76) San Diego, California, U.S.
- Height: 170 cm (5 ft 7 in)
- Weight: 60 kg (132 lb)

Sport
- Sport: Athletics
- Event(s): Sprint, hurdles
- Club: Angels Track Club

Achievements and titles
- Personal best(s): 100 m – 11.5 (1973); 200 m – 24.1 (1970); 100 mH – 13.0 (1972); 200 mH – 27.4 (1966)
Medal record
Representing the United States
Pan American Games
Gold medal – first place	1971 Cali	100 m hurdles

Patricia Jean "Patty" Van Wolvelaere (divorced Johnson; born April 15, 1950) is a retired hurdler from the United States who competed at the 1968 and 1972 Summer Olympics Olympics. Her best finish was the fourth place in the 80 m event in 1968. She won the 100 m hurdles at the 1971 Pan American Games and held four national outdoor titles in this event, in 1971, 1973–74 and 1977. Van Wolvelaere also won the National Indoor Championships in the 60 yard hurdles six times between 1967 and 1974, including four in a row in 1971–74.

Van Wolvelaere graduated from Renton High School and competed for the University of Southern California and Angels Track Club. She later worked as a firefighter. More recently, with the married last name of Weirich, she coaches at Ramona High School.

In 2017, she was inducted into the National Track and Field Hall of Fame.
