= Penka Sokolova =

Bulgarian hurdler

Personal information
- Nationality: Bulgarian
- Born: 16 April 1946 Varna, Bulgaria
- Died: 1977 (aged 30–31)

Sport
- Sport: Track and field
- Event: 100 metres hurdles

Penka Boneva-Sokolova (Bulgarian: Пенка Бонева-Соколова, 16 April 1946 – 1977) was a Bulgarian hurdler. She competed in the women's 100 metres hurdles at the 1976 Summer Olympics.
