= Mieke Sterk =

Dutch politician (1946–2026)

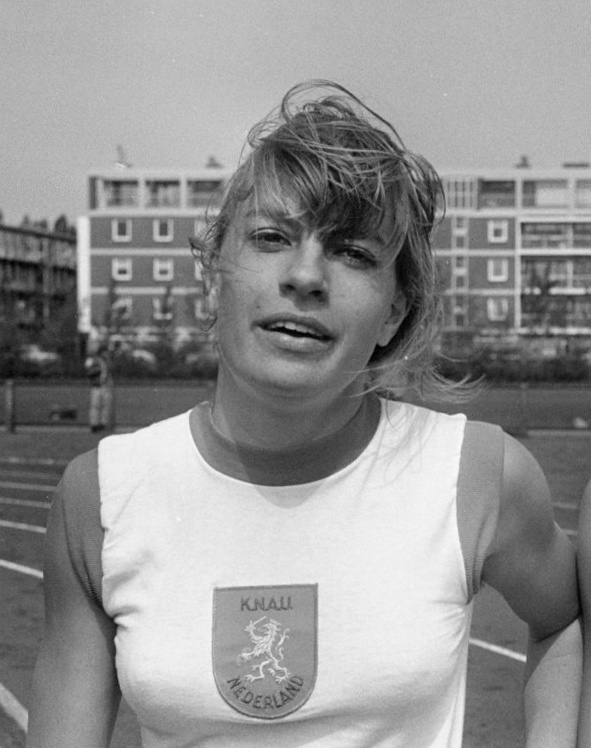
- Mieke Sterk in 1970

Personal information
- Born: 5 January 1946 Haarlem, Netherlands
- Died: 27 October 2026 (aged 80) Amsterdam, Netherlands
- Height: 1.68 m (5 ft 6 in)
- Weight: 59 kg (130 lb)

Sport
- Sport: Sprint, pentathlon, long jump
- Club: Atmodes, Haarlem
Medal record
Representing Netherlands
Summer Universiade
Bronze medal – third place	1970 Turin	Pentathlon

Mieke Sterk (Dutch: [ˈmikə ˈstɛr(ə)k]; 5 January 1946 – 27 October 2026) was a Dutch track and field athlete and politician. She was part of the Dutch 4×100 m relay team that finished in fourth place at the 1968 Summer Olympics. Individually, she failed to reach the final in the 200 m event. Two years later she won a bronze medal in the pentathlon at the 1970 Universiade and finished fifth in the 60 m hurdles at the European Indoor Championships. Her personal bests were 11.6 seconds in the 100 m (1968) and 23.5 seconds in the 200 m (1973). After retiring from athletics she became involved in politics and between 1994 and 1998 was a member of the Tweede Kamer of the Dutch House of Representatives.

Sterk died in Amsterdam on 27 October 2026, at the age of 80.

Awards
Preceded by Ilja Keizer-Laman	KNAU Cup; 1973	Succeeded by Ciska Janssen-Jansen
