= Teresa Sukniewicz =

Polish hurdler

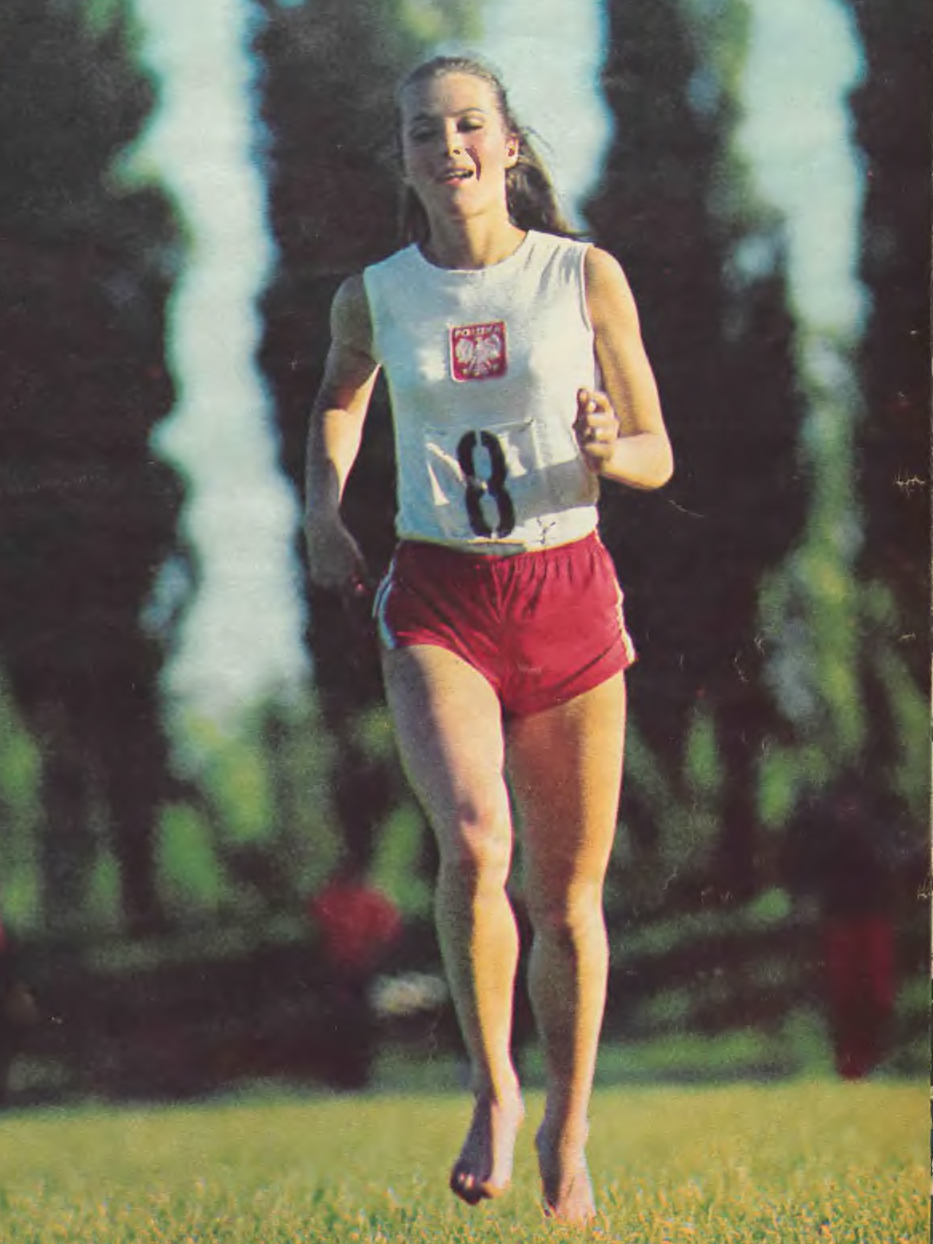
- Teresa Sukniewicz (1970)

Personal information
- Nationality: Polish
- Born: 10 November 1948 (age 77) Warsaw, Poland
- Height: 170 cm (5 ft 7 in)
- Weight: 58 kg (128 lb)

Sport
- Sport: Athletics
- Event: 80 metres hurdles
- Club: Lotnika Warszawa
Medal record
Women's athletics
Representing Poland
European Championships
Bronze medal – third place	1971 Helsinki	100 m hurdles
European Indoor Championships
Silver medal – second place	1972 Grenoble	50 m hurdles
Bronze medal – third place	1970 Vienna	60 m hurdles
Bronze medal – third place	1971 Sofia	60 m hurdles
Summer Universiade
Gold medal – first place	1970 Turin	100m hurdles

Teresa Sukniewicz Kleiber (born 10 November 1948) is a retired Polish hurdler who competed at the 1968 Summer Olympics.

== Biography ==
Sukniewicz finished second behind Pat Pryce in the 80 metres hurdles event at the British 1968 WAAA Championships.

Later that year at the 1968 Olympic Games in Mexico City, she represented Poland in the women's 80 metres hurdles.

She set three 100 m hurdles world records in 1969 and 1970.
