= Lyubov Nikitenko =

Medal record

Women's athletics

Representing the Soviet Union

IAAF World Cup
Bronze medal – third place	1977 Dusseldorf	100 m hurdles

European Indoor Championships
Gold medal – first place	1977 San Sebastián	60 m hurdles

Lyubov Nikitenko (Russian: Любовь Ивановна Кононова-Никитенко, married Kononova; born 6 December 1948) is a Kazakhstani former track and field hurdler for the Soviet Union. Born in Kostanay, she competed in the 100 metres hurdles at the 1976 Summer Olympics, where she was disqualified in the semi-finals.

Indoors in the 60 metres hurdles she won the gold medal at the 1977 European Athletics Indoor Championships and set a world record (unratified) time of 7.9 seconds in 1975 and 1976.

She also won a bronze medal at the 1977 IAAF World Cup, and was a five-time Soviet national champion.

== International competitions ==
Year	Competition	Venue	Position	Event	Notes
1976	European Indoor Championships	Munich, West Germany	6th	60 m hurdles	8.49
1976	Olympic Games	Montreal, Canada	—	100 m hurdles	DQ
1977	European Indoor Championships	San Sebastián, Spain	1st	60 m hurdles	8.29
1977	IAAF World Cup	Düsseldorf, West Germany	3rd	100 m hurdles	12.87

== National titles ==
- Soviet Athletics Championships
  - 100 m hurdles: 1971, 1973, 1977
- Soviet Indoor Athletics Championships
  - 60 m hurdles: 1972, 1975
