= Annerose Fiedler =

East German hurdler

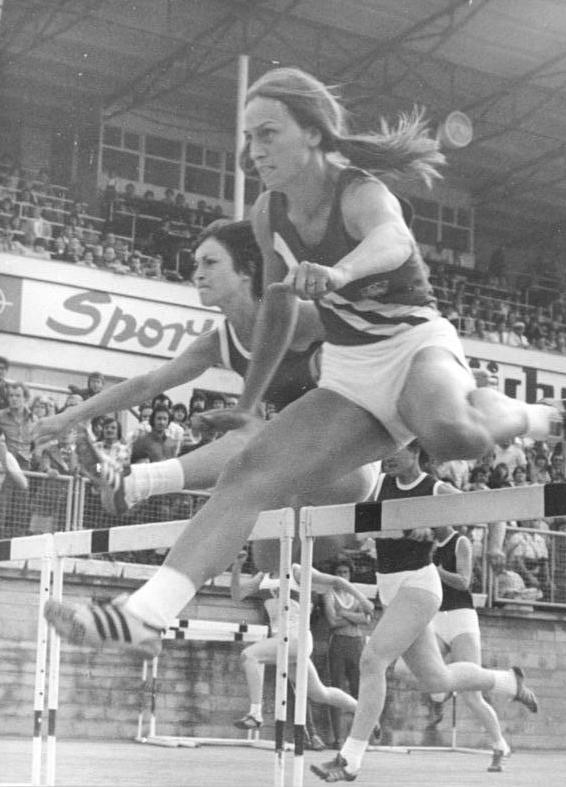
- Annerose Fiedler (left) 1977

Personal information
- Born: 5 September 1951 (age 74) Lützensömmern, East Germany

Sport
- Sport: Track and field
Medal record
Representing East Germany
European Championships
Silver medal – second place	1974 Rome	100 m hurdles
European Indoor Championships
Gold medal – first place	1974 Gothenburg	60 m hurdles
Summer Universiade
Silver medal – second place	1973 Moscow	100m hurdles
Bronze medal – third place	1973 Moscow	4x100m relay

Annerose Fiedler, née Krumpholz (born 5 September 1951) is a retired East German hurdler.

She competed for the sports club SC Turbine Erfurt during her active career.

== Achievements ==
Year	Tournament	Venue	Result	Extra
1972	Olympic Games	Munich, West Germany	7th	100 m hurdles
1974	European Indoor Championships	Gothenburg, Sweden	1st	60 m hurdles
1974	European Championships	Rome, Italy	2nd	100 m hurdles
1975	European Indoor Championships	Katowice, Poland	4th	60 m hurdles
1978	European Championships	Prague, Czechoslovakia	6th	100 m hurdles
