= Jacqueline André =

French hurdler

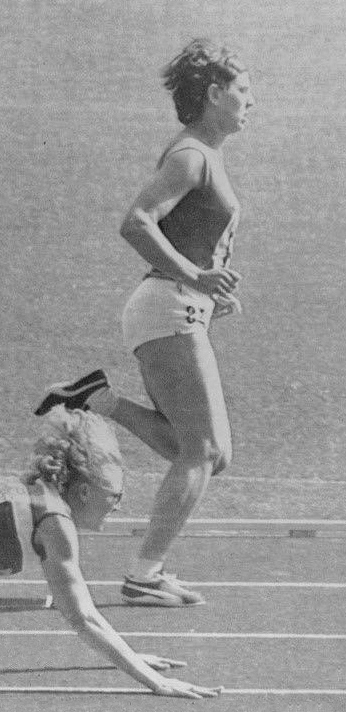
- André at the 1972 Olympics

Personal information
- Nationality: French
- Born: 29 August 1946 (age 79) Nantes, France
- Years active: 1964–1973
- Height: 1.68 m (5 ft 6 in)
- Weight: 62 kg (137 lb)

Sport
- Sport: Athletics
- Event: Hurdles
- Club: Nantes EC

Achievements and titles
- Personal best: 100 mH – 13.1 (1972)

Jacqueline André (née Bonnet on 29 August 1946) is a retired French hurdler. She competed in the 100 m event at the 1972 Summer Olympics, but failed to reach the final.

== Biography ==
André won three French Championships: one outdoors, in the 100 m hurdles in 1972, and two indoors, in the 50 m hurdles (1972) and 60 m hurdles (1973). She bettered five times the French record of the 100 meters hurdles, bringing it to 13.30 in 1972.

=== Prize list ===
- French Outdoors Athletic Championships:
  - winner of the 100m hurdles in 1972
- French Indoors Athletics Championships:
  - winner of 50 m hurdles 1972
  - winner of the 60m hurdles in 1973
