= Ileana Ongar =

Italian hurdler

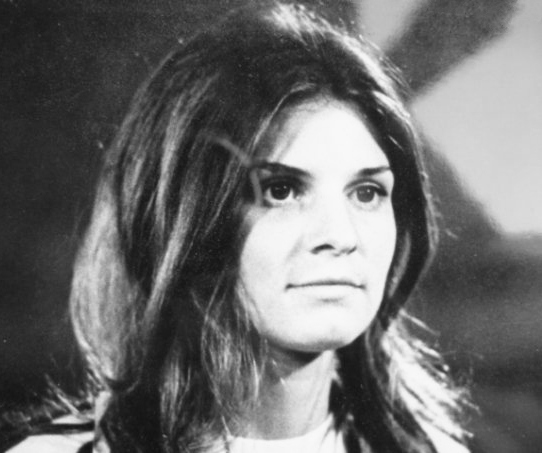
- Ongar in 1971

Personal information
- Nationality: Italian
- Born: 24 March 1950 (age 76) Alexandria, Egypt
- Height: 1.68 m (5 ft 6 in)
- Weight: 57 kg (126 lb)

Sport
- Country: Italy
- Sport: Athletics
- Event: 100 metres hurdles
- Club: Bruno Zauli Lazio

Achievements and titles
- Personal bests: 60 m hs: 8.36 (1976); 100 m hs: 13.24 (1976)
Medal record
Mediterranean Games
Gold medal – first place	1971 İzmir	4 × 100 metres relay
Silver medal – second place	1971 İzmir	100 metres hurdles
Silver medal – second place	1975 Algers	100 metres hurdles
Bronze medal – third place	1975 Algers	4 × 100 metres relay

Ileana Ongar (born 24 March 1950 in Alexandria) is a former Italian hurdler, that was 8th at 1976 Summer Olympics (110 m hs) and earned four medals at the Mediterranean Games.

== Biography ==
Ileana Ongar participated at one edition of the Summer Olympics (1976), she has 36 caps in national team from 1971 to 1978.

== National records ==
- 60 metres hurdles: 8.36 ( (Italy) Milan, 10 February 1976) – holder until February 1986
- 100 metres hurdles: 13.24 ( (West Germany) Fürth, 13 June 1976) – holder until July 1986

== Progression ==
100 metres hurdles

Year	Performance	Venue	Date	World Ranking
1976	13.24	(West Germany) Fürth	13 June	14ª
1975	13.56	(West Germany) Luedenscheid	12 July	25ª

== Achievements ==
Year	Competition	Venue	Position	Event	Performance	Note
1976	Olympic Games	(Canada) Montreal	8th	100 metres hurdles	13.51	
1977	European Indoor Championships	(Spain) San Sebastián	6th	60 metres hurdles	8.47	

== National titles ==
Ileana Ongar has won 12 times the individual national championship.

- 7 wins in 100 metres hurdles (1972, 1973, 1974, 1975, 1976, 1978)
- 5 wins in 60 metres hurdles indoor (1971, 1972, 1976, 1977, 1978)

== See also ==
- Italian all-time lists – 100 metres hurdles
- Italy national relay team
