= Teresa Nowak =

Polish hurdler (1942–2024)

Personal information
- Nationality: Polish
- Born: 29 April 1942 Piotrków Trybunalski, General Government (now Poland)
- Died: October 2024 (aged 82) Sweden
- Height: 172 cm (5 ft 8 in)
- Weight: 60 kg (132 lb)

Sport
- Sport: Track and field Athletics
- Event: hurdles
- Club: Gwardia Warszawa
Medal record
Women's athletics
Representing Poland
European Championships
Bronze medal – third place	1969 Athens	100 m hurdles
Bronze medal – third place	1974 Rome	100 m hurdles
European Indoor Championships
Bronze medal – third place	1973 Rotterdam	60 m hurdles

Teresa Nowak (née Gierczak, 29 April 1942 – October 2024) was a Polish hurdler, who competed at the 1972 Summer Olympics.

== Biography ==
Nowak finished second behind Chi Cheng in the 100 metres hurdles event at the British 1969 WAAA Championships.

At the 1972 Olympics Games in Munich, she represented Poland in the women's 100 metres hurdles competition.

Nowak died in October 2024, at the age of 82.
