= Bożena Nowakowska =

Polish hurdler

Personal information
- Nationality: Polish
- Born: 21 March 1955 (age 71) Warsaw, Poland
- Height: 1.68 m (5 ft 6 in)
- Weight: 59 kg (130 lb)

Sport
- Sport: Track and field
- Event: 100 metres hurdles
- Club: KS Warszawianka
Medal record
Women's athletics
Representing Poland
European Indoor Championships
Bronze medal – third place	1976 Munich	60m hurdles
Summer Universiade
Silver medal – second place	1975 Rome	100m hurdles

Bożena Nowakowska, married Świerczyńska (born 21 March 1955) is a Polish hurdler. She competed in the women's 100 metres hurdles at the 1976 Summer Olympics. She is married to Polish Olympic athlete Andrzej Świerczyński.

Her personal best in the 100 metres hurdles is 12.91 set in 1975.
