= Annelie Ehrhardt =

East German hurdler (1950–2024)

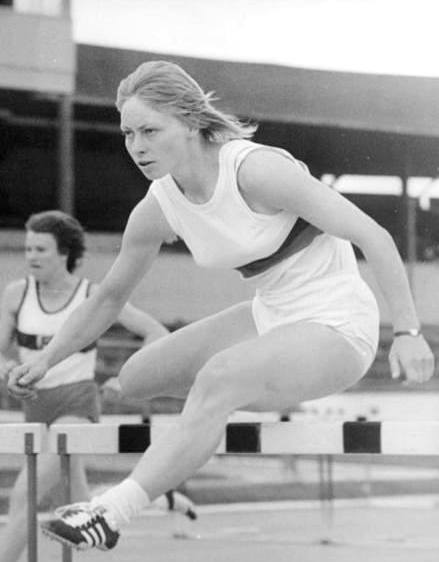
- Ehrhardt in 1973

Personal information
- Born: Annelie Jahns; 18 June 1950 Ohrsleben, Saxony-Anhalt, East Germany
- Died: 18 October 2024 (aged 74) Magdeburg, Germany
- Height: 1.66 m (5 ft 5 in)
- Weight: 58 kg (128 lb)

Sport
- Sport: Athletics
- Event: 100 m hurdles
- Club: SC Magdeburg

Achievements and titles
- Personal best: 12.3 (1973)
Medal record
Women's athletics
Representing East Germany
Olympic Games
Gold medal – first place	1972 Munich	100 m hurdles
European Championships
Gold medal – first place	1974 Rome	100 m hurdles
Silver medal – second place	1971 Helsinki	100 m hurdles
European Indoor Championships
Gold medal – first place	1972 Grenoble	50 m hurdles
Gold medal – first place	1973 Rotterdam	60 m hurdles
Silver medal – second place	1971 Sofia	60 m hurdles
Silver medal – second place	1975 Katowice	60 m hurdles

Annelie Ehrhardt (née Jahns; 18 June 1950 – 18 October 2024) was an East German hurdler. She won the gold medal in the inaugural 100 metre hurdles event at the 1972 Summer Olympics held in Munich, West Germany, setting a new world record, and becoming the first East German Olympic Champion in this event. She also won a silver medal at the 1971 European Championships and a gold medal at the 1974 European Championships in a new championship record of 12.66 seconds.

Born Annelie Jahns, she married Olympic sprint canoer Manfred Ehrhardt in 1970 and became known under her married name. During her career Ehrhardt won 11 national titles and set 20 world records over various hurdle distances, indoors and outdoors. She was a photo laboratory assistant by profession.

Ehrhardt died in Magdeburg on 18 October 2024, at the age of 74.
