= Tatyana Anisimova =

Soviet hurdler

Personal information
- Born: 19 October 1949 (age 76) Grozny, Soviet Union

Sport
- Sport: Track and field
Medal record
Representing Soviet Union
Olympic Games
Silver medal – second place	1976 Montreal	100m hurdles
European Championships
Silver medal – second place	1978 Prague	100m hurdles
European Indoor Championships
Bronze medal – third place	1975 Katowice	60m hurdles
Bronze medal – third place	1981 Grenoble	50m hurdles
Summer Universiade
Gold medal – first place	1975 Rome	4x100m relay
Gold medal – first place	1977 Sofia	4x100m relay
Gold medal – first place	1979 Mexico City	4x100m relay
Silver medal – second place	1977 Sofia	100m hurdles
Bronze medal – third place	1975 Rome	100m hurdles

Tatyana Anisimova (Татья́на Ани́симова) (born as Tatyana Poluboyarova, 19 October 1949) is a retired hurdler who represented the USSR. Anisimova was born in Grozny and trained at Burevestnik in Leningrad. She won a silver medal at the 1978 European Athletics Championships and at the 1976 Montreal Olympics.

She was a five-time medallist at the Summer Universiade in 1975, 1977 and 1979. She twice won a 60 metres hurdles bronze medal at the European Athletics Indoor Championships, doing so in 1975 and 1981.

== International competitions ==
Year	Competition	Venue	Position	Event	Notes
1975	European Indoor Championships	Katowice, Poland	3rd	60 m hurdles	
1976	Olympic Games	Montreal, Canada	2nd	100 m hurdles	
1975	Universiade	Rome, Italy	3rd	100 m hurdles	
1977	Universiade	Sofia, Bulgaria	2nd	100 m hurdles	
1978	European Championships	Prague, Czech Republic	2nd	100 m hurdles	
1980	Olympic Games	Moscow, Soviet Union	DNF	100 m hurdles	
1981	European Indoor Championships	Grenoble, France	3rd	60 m hurdles	

Sporting positions
Preceded by Grażyna Rabsztyn	Women's 100m Hurdles Best Year Performance; 1981	Succeeded by Yordanka Donkova
