= Valeria Bufanu =

Romanian athletics competitor

Valeria Bufanu née Ștefănescu
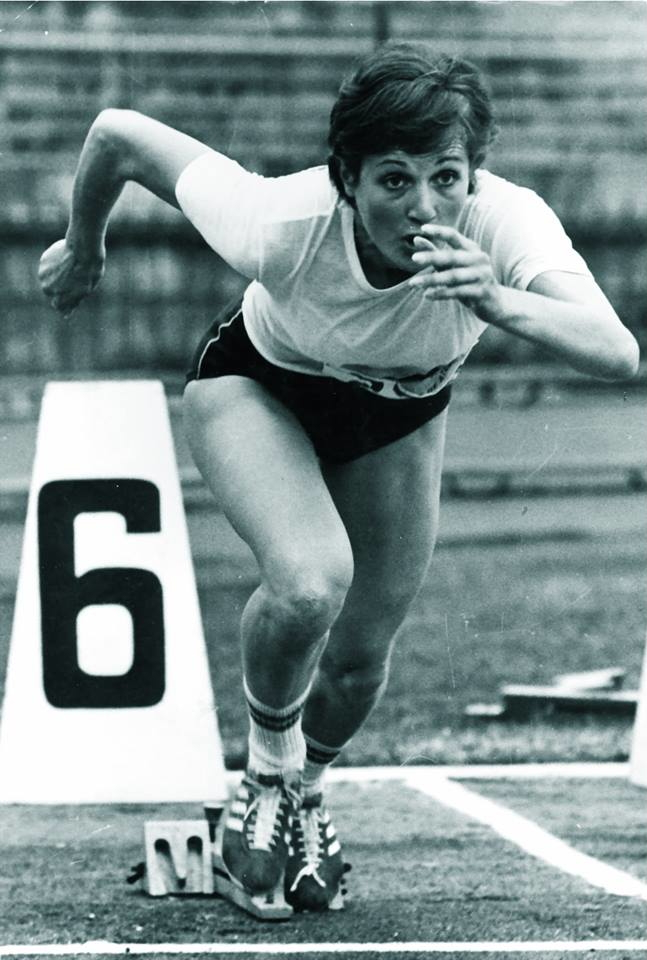

Personal information
- Nationality: Romanian
- Born: 7 October 1946 (age 80) Bacău, Romania
- Height: 170 cm (5 ft 7 in)
- Weight: 60 kg (132 lb)

Sport
- Sport: Athletics
- Event: hurdles
- Club: Rapid București
Medal record
Women's athletics
Representing Romania
Olympic Games
Silver medal – second place	1972 Munich	100 m hurdles
European Indoor Championships
Silver medal – second place	1973 Rotterdam	60 m hurdles
Bronze medal – third place	1974 Gothenburg	Long jump
Summer Universiade
Bronze medal – third place	1970 Turin	100m hurdles

Valeria Bufanu, née Ștefănescu (born 7 October 1946) is a Romanian retired athlete who mainly competed in hurdling and sprints and competed at three Olympic Games.

== Biography ==
She won the national championships in 100 metres hurdles five consecutive seasons: 1967 - 1971. In addition she won gold medals in 400 metres hurdles (1969), pentathlon (1970) and 100 metres (1970 and 1971).

Bufanu won the British WAAA Championships title in the 100 metres hurdles event at the 1971 WAAA Championships.

At the 1972 Summer Olympics in Munich, where the 100 metres hurdles event was held for the first time (the previous distance being 80 metres), Bufanu won a silver medal, sharing the podium with East Germans Annelie Ehrhardt (gold) and Karin Balzer (bronze). The next year Bufanu won a silver medal in 60 metres hurdles at the European Indoor Championships.

At the 1976 Olympics Games in Montreal, she represented Romania in the 100 metres hurdles competition.
