= Gunhild Olsson =

Swedish sprinter

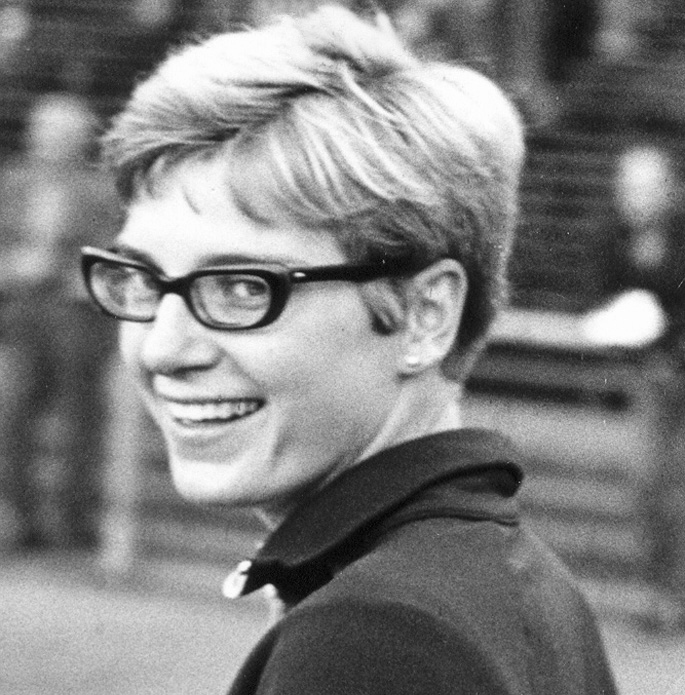

Personal information
- Nationality: Swedish
- Born: 30 January 1946 (age 79) Ljusne, Sweden

Sport
- Sport: Sprinting
- Event: 4 × 100 metres relay
- Club: IFK Helsingborg

Gunhild Margareta Olsson (born 30 January 1946) is a Swedish sprinter. She competed in the 100 m hurdles and 4 × 100 metres relay at the 1972 Summer Olympics, but failed to reach the finals. Olympic bobsledder Karin Olsson is her daughter.
