= 100 metres hurdles =

Track and field event

Athletics 100 metres hurdles
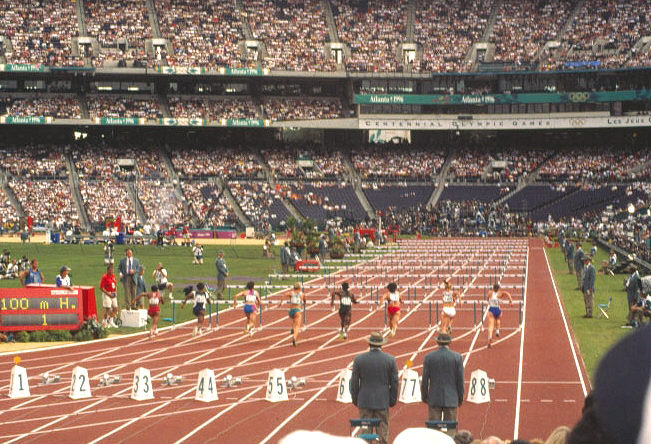
- A 100 m hurdles race at Atlanta 1996

World records
- Women: Masai Russell (USA) 12.09 (2026)

Olympic records
- Women: Jasmine Camacho-Quinn (PRI) 12.26 (2021)

World Championship records
- Women: Tobi Amusan (NGR) 12.12 (2022)

Athletics Women's 100m hurdles Final – 27th Summer Universiade 2013 – Kazan (RUS)

The 100 metres hurdles, or 100-meter hurdles, is a track and field event run mainly by women (the male counterpart is the 110 metres hurdles). For the race, ten hurdles of a height of 83.8 centimetres (33 in) are placed along a straight course of 100 metres (109.36 yd). The first hurdle is placed after a run-up of 13 metres from the starting line. The next 9 hurdles are set at a distance of 8.5 metres from each other, and the home stretch from the last hurdle to the finish line is 10.5 metres long. The hurdles are set up so that they will fall over if bumped into by the runner, but weighted so this is disadvantageous. Fallen hurdles do not count against runners provided that they do not run into them on purpose. Like the 100 metres sprint, the 100 m hurdles begins with athletes in starting blocks.

The fastest 100 m hurdlers run the distance in well under 13 seconds. The world record set by Masai Russell stands at 12.09 seconds.

== History ==
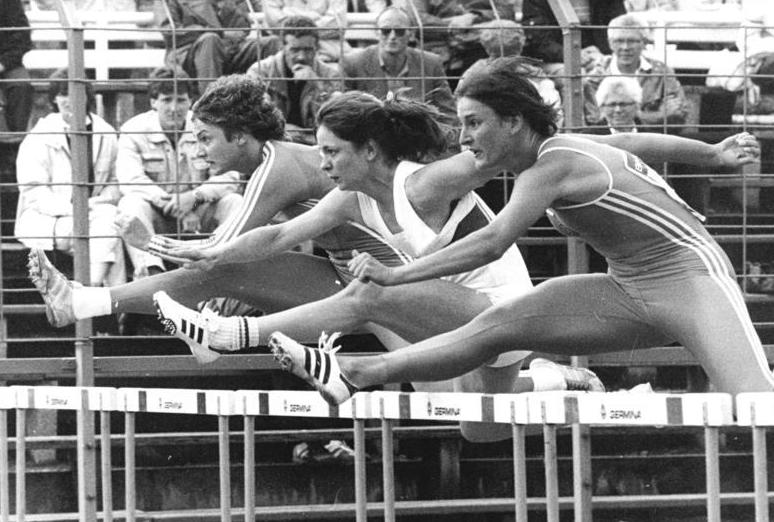
Cornelia Oschkenat (nearest camera), Heike Theele, and Kerstin Knabe (1986)

The race started back in the 1830s in England where wooden barriers were placed along a 100-yard stretch. The hurdles event was included as part of the inaugural Women's World Games in 1922, and made its first appearance in the Olympic Games in 1932 as 80m hurdles.

Starting with the 1972 Summer Olympics, the women's race was lengthened to 100m hurdles.

The hurdles sprint race has been run by women since the beginning of women's athletics, just after the end of World War I. The distances and hurdle heights varied widely in the beginning. While the men had zeroed in on the 110 m hurdles, the International Women's Sport Federation had registered records for eight different disciplines by 1926 (60 yards/75 cm height, 60 yards/61 cm, 65 yards/75 cm, 83 yards/75 cm, 100 yards/75 cm, 100 yards/61 cm, 120 yards/75 cm, 110 metres/75 cm). At the first Women's World Games in 1922, a 100 m hurdles race was run.

From 1926 until 1968, the distance was 80 metres: women had to clear eight hurdles placed at a distance of 8 metres from each other and a height of 76.2 centimetres (30 in).

Just like with the men's races, until 1935 no more than three hurdles could be knocked over, or the runner was disqualified, and records were only officially registered if the runner had cleared all her hurdles clean.

In 1935, this rule was abandoned, and L-shaped hurdles were introduced that fell over forward easily and greatly reduced the risk of injury to the runner. Hurdles are weighted, so when properly set for the height (for women, closer to the fulcrum of the "L"), they serve as a consistent disadvantage to making contact with the barrier.

Comparison of 80 m and 100 m hurdles
Distance	Number of hurdles	Height	Distance made up of		
Distance	Number of hurdles	Height	Runup	Intervals	Home stretch
80 m	8	76.2 cm	12 m	8.0 m	12.0 m
100 m	10	83.8 cm	13 m	8.5 m	10.5 m

The 80 m hurdles was on the list of women's sports demanded by the International Women's Sport Federation for the Olympic Summer Games in 1928, but was not included as an Olympic discipline until 1932. Starting with 1949, the 80 m hurdles was one of the disciplines included in the women's pentathlon.

During the 1960s, some experimental races were run over a distance of 100 metres using hurdles with a height of 76.2 centimetres (30 in). During the 1968 Summer Olympics, a decision was made to introduce the 100 m hurdles from 1969, using hurdles with a height of 83.8 centimetres (33 in).

The first international event in the 100 m hurdles occurred at the European Athletics Championships, which were won by Karin Balzer of the GDR.

The modern 100 m race has an extra two hurdles compared to the 80 m race, which are higher and spaced slightly further apart. The home stretch is shorter by 1.5 m.

Currently, women run 110 m hurdles at the World Athletics Relays, a mixed team event, which was instituted in 2019.

== Masters athletics ==
A version of the 100 metres hurdles is also used for 50- to 59-year-old men in Masters athletics. They run the same spacing as women, which coordinates with existing markings on most tracks, but run over 91.4 cm (36 in) hurdles. In the 60-69 age range, the spacings are changed. Women over age 40 and men over age 70 run 80 metre versions with different heights and spacings.

== Milestones ==
100 m hurdles:

- First official time registered with hurdles of reduced height of 76.2 centimetres (30 in): Pamela Kilborn, AUS, 26 November 1961
- First official time with hurdles of standard height of 83.8 centimetres (33 in): 15.1 seconds, Connie Pettersson, USA, 28 May 1966
- First official world record: 13.3 seconds, Karin Balzer, GDR, 20 June 1969
- First runner under 13 seconds: 12.9 seconds, Karin Balzer, GDR, 5 September 1969
- First runner under 12.5 seconds:
  - 12.3 seconds, Annelie Ehrhardt GDR, 20 July 1973 (last hand timed world record; electronically timed at 12.68 seconds)
  - 12.48 seconds, Grażyna Rabsztyn, POL, 10 June 1978
- First runner under 12.3 seconds: 12.29 seconds, Yordanka Donkova BUL, 17 August 1986
- First runner under 12.2 seconds: 12.12 seconds, Tobi Amusan NGR, 24 July 2022. 12.06 seconds (wind aided) Tobi Amusan NGR, 24 July 2022.
- First country to win gold, silver, and bronze in the women's 100 m hurdles in one Olympics: USA (Brianna Rollins, Nia Ali and Kristi Castlin), 2016; this was also the first time American women achieved such a sweep in any Olympic event

== Area records ==
- Updated 27 August 2026.

Area	Time (s)	Wind (m/s)	Season	Athlete
World	12.09	±0.0	2026	Masai Russell (USA)
Area records
Africa (records)	12.12	+0.9	2022	Tobi Amusan (NGR)
Asia (records)	12.44	−0.8	1995	Olga Shishigina (KAZ)
Europe (records)	12.21	+0.7	1988	Yordanka Donkova (BUL)
North, Central America and Caribbean (records)	12.09	±0.0	2026	Masai Russell (USA)
Oceania (records)	12.28	+1.1	2011	Sally Pearson (AUS)
South America (records)	12.49	+1.3	2024	Maribel Caicedo (ECU)

== All-time top 25 ==
Table shows data for two definitions of "Top 25" - the top 25 100m hurdles times and the top 25 athletes:
- denotes top performance for athletes in the top 25 100m hurdles times
- denotes lesser performances, still in the top 25 100m hurdles times, by repeat athletes
- denotes top performance (only) for other top 25 athletes who fall outside the top 25 100m hurdles times

- Correct as of September 2026.

Ath.#	Perf.#	Time (s)	Wind (m/s)	Reaction (s)	Athlete	Nation	Date	Place	Ref.
1	1	12.09	±0.0	0.140	Masai Russell	United States	27 August 2026	Zurich	
2	2	12.12	+0.9	0.144	Tobi Amusan	Nigeria	24 July 2022	Eugene	
	3	12.14	+0.5	0.118	Russell #2		23 May 2026	Xiamen	
	4	12.17	+2.0		Russell #3		2 May 2025	Miramar	
3	5	12.19	+2.0		Tia Jones	United States	2 May 2025	Miramar	
	5	12.19	+1.4	0.150	Russell #4		16 August 2025	Chorzów	
4	7	12.20	+0.3	0.149	Kendra Harrison	United States	22 July 2016	London	
	7	12.20	−0.4	0.118	Russell #5		10 July 2026	Monaco	
	7	12.20	+1.0	0.124	Russell #6		5 September 2026	Brussels	
5	10	12.21	+0.7		Yordanka Donkova	Bulgaria	20 August 1988	Stara Zagora	
5	10	12.21	+0.7	0.146	Grace Stark	United States	20 June 2025	Paris	
	12	12.22	+0.7		Russell #7		2 August 2025	Eugene	
	12	12.22	+0.1	0.137	Russell #8		11 September 2026	Budapest	
	14	12.23	±0.0	0.148	Amusan #2		27 August 2026	Zurich	
	15	12.24	+0.9		Donkova #2		28 August 1988	Stara Zagora	
	15	12.24	+0.7		Harrison #2		28 May 2016	Eugene	
	15	12.24	+0.1	0.155	Harrison #3		22 August 2023	Budapest	
7	15	12.24	−0.4	0.153	Ackera Nugent	Jamaica	30 August 2024	Rome	
	15	12.24	+0.7	0.131	Amusan #3		20 June 2025	Paris	
7	15	12.24	+1.4	0.129	Tonea Marshall	United States	16 August 2025	Chorzów	
7	15	12.24	−0.1	0.146	Ditaji Kambundji	Switzerland	15 September 2025	Tokyo	
	15	12.24	+0.8		Russell #9		4 July 2026	Eugene	
10	23	12.25	+1.4		Ginka Zagorcheva	Bulgaria	8 August 1987	Drama	
	23	12.25	+0.7		Russell #10		30 June 2024	Eugene	
	23	12.25	+1.5		Russell #11		2 August 2025	Eugene	
	23	12.25	+1.4	0.156	Amusan #4		16 August 2025	Chorzów	
	23	12.25	+0.4	0.131	Russell #12		16 May 2026	Shaoxing	
11		12.26	+1.7		Ludmila Narozhilenko	Russia	6 June 1992	Seville	
11		12.26	+1.2		Brianna Rollins	United States	22 June 2013	Des Moines	
11		12.26	−0.2	0.172	Jasmine Camacho-Quinn	Puerto Rico	1 August 2021	Tokyo	
14		12.28	+1.1	0.145	Sally Pearson	Australia	3 September 2011	Daegu	
14		12.28	+1.1	0.148	Nadine Visser	Netherlands	16 August 2025	Chorzów	
16		12.30	+0.6	0.153	Nia Ali	United States	21 July 2023	Monaco	
17		12.31	+0.3	0.143	Britany Anderson	Jamaica	24 July 2022	Eugene	
17		12.31	+0.8	0.150	Cyréna Samba-Mayela	France	8 June 2024	Rome	
17		12.31	+0.7		Alaysha Johnson	United States	30 June 2024	Eugene	
17		12.31	+1.4	0.122	Danielle Williams	Jamaica	16 August 2025	Chorzów	
21		12.32	+1.4	0.149	Alia Armstrong	United States	16 August 2025	Chorzów	
22		12.33	−0.3		Gail Devers	United States	23 July 2000	Sacramento	
22		12.33	+1.0	0.125	Devynne Charlton	Bahamas	5 September 2026	Brussels	
24		12.34	+1.9		Sharika Nelvis	United States	26 June 2015	Eugene	
24		12.34	+0.1		Megan Tapper	Jamaica	29 June 2025	Kingston	

=== Assisted marks ===
Any performance with a following wind of more than 2.0 metres per second does not count for record purposes. Below is a list of all wind-assisted times equal or superior to 12.30:

- Tobi Amusan (NGR) ran 12.06 (+2.5) in Eugene, Oregon on 24 July 2022 and 12.19 (+3.8) in Glasgow on 30 July 2026.
- Jasmine Camacho-Quinn (PUR) ran 12.17 (+3.5) in Devonshire, Bermuda on 21 May 2023, 12.23 (+2.5) in Eugene, Oregon on 24 July 2022, and 12.27 (+2.4) on 8 August 2022 in Székesfehérvár.
- Britany Anderson (JAM) ran 12.23 (+2.5) in Eugene, Oregon on 24 July 2022.
- Cornelia Oschkenat (GDR) ran 12.28 (+2.7) in Berlin on 25 August 1987.
- Yordanka Donkova (BUL) ran 12.29 (+3.5) in Lausanne on 24 June 1988.
- Gail Devers (USA) ran 12.29 (+2.7) in Eugene, Oregon on 26 May 2002.
- Lolo Jones (USA) ran 12.29 (+3.8) in Eugene, Oregon on 6 July 2008.
- Kendra Harrison (USA) ran 12.29 (+2.8) in New York City on 24 June 2023
- Brianna Rollins (USA) ran 12.30 (+2.8) in Des Moines, Iowa on 22 June 2013.
- Alaysha Johnson (USA) ran 12.30 (+2.8) in New York City on 24 June 2023.

== Most successful athletes ==
- Shirley Strickland (AUS): two Olympic victories, 1952 and 1956 in the 80 m hurdles.
- Ludmila Narozhilenko-Engquist (URS)/(RUS)/(SWE): Olympic victory, 1996, two World Championship victories, 1991 and 1997.
- Gail Devers (USA): three World Championships, 1993, 1995, 1999, as well as runner-up at the 1991 and 2001 World Championships.
- Sally Pearson (AUS): Olympic victory in 2012, as well as runner-up in 2008. World Championship victories in 2011 and 2017, as well as runner-up in 2013.
- Brianna Rollins (USA): Olympic victory in 2016, World Championships 2013.
- Danielle Williams (JAM): Two World Championships victories, 2015 and 2023.

== Olympic medalists ==
Games	Gold	Silver	Bronze
1972 Munich	Annelie Ehrhardt; East Germany	Valeria Bufanu; Romania	Karin Balzer; East Germany
1976 Montreal	Johanna Schaller; East Germany	Tatyana Anisimova; Soviet Union	Natalya Lebedeva; Soviet Union
1980 Moscow	Vera Komisova; Soviet Union	Johanna Klier; East Germany	Lucyna Langer; Poland
1984 Los Angeles	Benita Fitzgerald; United States	Shirley Strong; Great Britain	Michèle Chardonnet; France
1984 Los Angeles	Benita Fitzgerald; United States	Shirley Strong; Great Britain	Kim Turner; United States
1988 Seoul	Yordanka Donkova; Bulgaria	Gloria Siebert; East Germany	Claudia Zaczkiewicz; West Germany
1992 Barcelona	Voula Patoulidou; Greece	LaVonna Martin; United States	Yordanka Donkova; Bulgaria
1996 Atlanta	Ludmila Engquist; Sweden	Brigita Bukovec; Slovenia	Patricia Girard; France
2000 Sydney	Olga Shishigina; Kazakhstan	Glory Alozie; Nigeria	Melissa Morrison; United States
2004 Athens	Joanna Hayes; United States	Olena Krasovska; Ukraine	Melissa Morrison; United States
2008 Beijing	Dawn Harper; United States	Sally Pearson; Australia	Priscilla Lopes-Schliep; Canada
2012 London	Sally Pearson; Australia	Dawn Harper; United States	Kellie Wells; United States
2016 Rio de Janeiro	Brianna Rollins; United States	Nia Ali; United States	Kristi Castlin; United States
2020 Tokyo	Jasmine Camacho-Quinn; Puerto Rico	Kendra Harrison; United States	Megan Tapper; Jamaica
2024 Paris	Masai Russell; United States	Cyréna Samba-Mayela; France	Jasmine Camacho-Quinn; Puerto Rico

== World Championships medalists ==
Championships	Gold	Silver	Bronze
1983 Helsinki	Bettine Jahn (GDR)	Kerstin Knabe (GDR)	Ginka Zagorcheva (BUL)
1987 Rome	Ginka Zagorcheva (BUL)	Gloria Uibel (GDR)	Cornelia Oschkenat (GDR)
1991 Tokyo	Ludmila Narozhilenko (URS)	Gail Devers (USA)	Nataliya Grygoryeva (URS)
1993 Stuttgart	Gail Devers (USA)	Marina Azyabina (RUS)	Lynda Tolbert-Goode (USA)
1995 Gothenburg	Gail Devers (USA)	Olga Shishigina (KAZ)	Yuliya Graudyn (RUS)
1997 Athens	Ludmila Engquist (SWE)	Svetla Dimitrova (BUL)	Michelle Freeman (JAM)
1999 Seville	Gail Devers (USA)	Glory Alozie (NGR)	Ludmila Engquist (SWE)
2001 Edmonton	Anjanette Kirkland (USA)	Gail Devers (USA)	Olga Shishigina (KAZ)
2003 Saint-Denis	Perdita Felicien (CAN)	Brigitte Foster-Hylton (JAM)	Miesha McKelvy (USA)
2005 Helsinki	Michelle Perry (USA)	Delloreen Ennis-London (JAM)	Brigitte Foster-Hylton (JAM)
2007 Osaka	Michelle Perry (USA)	Perdita Felicien (CAN)	Delloreen Ennis-London (JAM)
2009 Berlin	Brigitte Foster-Hylton (JAM)	Priscilla Lopes-Schliep (CAN)	Delloreen Ennis-London (JAM)
2011 Daegu	Sally Pearson (AUS)	Danielle Carruthers (USA)	Dawn Harper (USA)
2013 Moscow	Brianna Rollins (USA)	Sally Pearson (AUS)	Tiffany Porter (GBR)
2015 Beijing	Danielle Williams (JAM)	Cindy Roleder (GER)	Alina Talay (BLR)
2017 London	Sally Pearson (AUS)	Dawn Harper-Nelson (USA)	Pamela Dutkiewicz (GER)
2019 Doha	Nia Ali (USA)	Kendra Harrison (USA)	Danielle Williams (JAM)
2022 Eugene	Tobi Amusan (NGR)	Britany Anderson (JAM)	Jasmine Camacho-Quinn (PUR)
2023 Budapest	Danielle Williams (JAM)	Jasmine Camacho-Quinn (PUR)	Kendra Harrison (USA)
2025 Tokyo	Ditaji Kambundji (CHE)	Tobi Amusan (NGR)	Grace Stark (USA)

== World leading times ==
Year	Time	Athlete	Place
1970	12.93	Chi Cheng (ROC)	Munich
1971	12.6 h	Karin Balzer (GDR)	East Berlin
1972	12.59	Anneliese Ehrhardt (GDR)	Munich
1973	12.68	Anneliese Ehrhardt (GDR)	Dresden
1974	12.66	Anneliese Ehrhardt (GDR)	Rome
1975	12.91	Bożena Świerczyńska (POL)	Zielona Góra
1976	12.69	Grażyna Rabsztyn (POL)	Bydgoszcz
1977	12.87	Lyubov Kononova (URS)	Düsseldorf
1978	12.48	Grażyna Rabsztyn (POL)	Fürth
1979	12.48	Grażyna Rabsztyn (POL)	Warsaw
1980	12.36	Grażyna Rabsztyn (POL)	Warsaw
1981	12.68	Tatyana Anisimova (URS)	Tbilisi
1982	12.44	Yordanka Donkova (BUL)	Sofia
1983	12.42	Bettine Jahn (GDR)	Berlin
1984	12.43	Lucyna Kalek (POL)	Hanover
1985	12.42	Ginka Zagorcheva (BUL)	Sofia
1986	12.26	Yordanka Donkova (BUL)	Ljubljana
1987	12.25	Ginka Zagorcheva (BUL)	Dráma
1988	12.21	Yordanka Donkova (BUL)	Stara Zagora
1989	12.60	Cornelia Oschkenat (GDR)	Barcelona
1990	12.53	Nataliya Grygoryeva (URS)	Kyiv
1991	12.28	Ludmila Narozhilenko (URS)	Kyiv
1992	12.26	Ludmila Narozhilenko (RUS)	Seville
1993	12.46	Gail Devers (USA)	Stuttgart
1994	12.53	Tatyana Reshetnikova (RUS)	Linz
1994	12.53	Svetla Dimitrova (BUL)	Stara Zagora
1995	12.44	Olga Shishigina (KAZ)	Lucerne
1996	12.47	Ludmila Engquist (SWE)	Atlanta
1997	12.50	Ludmila Engquist (SWE)	Athens
1998	12.44	Glory Alozie (NGR)	Monaco
1999	12.37	Gail Devers (USA)	Seville
2000	12.33	Gail Devers (USA)	Sacramento
2001	12.42	Anjanette Kirkland (USA)	Edmonton
2002	12.40	Gail Devers (USA)	Lausanne
2003	12.45	Brigitte Foster-Hylton (JAM)	Eugene
2003	12.45	Gail Devers (USA)	Monaco
2004	12.37	Joanna Hayes (USA)	Athens
2005	12.43	Michelle Perry (USA)	Carson
2006	12.43	Michelle Perry (USA)	Lausanne
2007	12.44	Michelle Perry (USA)	Rome
2008	12.43	Lolo Jones (USA)	Beijing
2009	12.46	Brigitte Foster-Hylton (JAM)	Zurich
2010	12.52	Priscilla Lopes-Schliep (CAN)	London
2011	12.28	Sally Pearson (AUS)	Daegu
2012	12.35	Sally Pearson (AUS)	London
2013	12.26	Brianna Rollins (USA)	Des Moines
2014	12.44	Dawn Harper-Nelson (USA)	Paris
2015	12.34	Sharika Nelvis (USA)	Eugene
2016	12.20	Kendra Harrison (USA)	London
2017	12.28	Kendra Harrison (USA)	Székesfehérvár
2018	12.36	Kendra Harrison (USA)	London
2019	12.32	Danielle Williams (JAM)	London
2020	12.68	Nadine Visser (NED)	Turku
2021	12.26	Jasmine Camacho-Quinn (PUR)	Tokyo
2022	12.12	Tobi Amusan (NGR)	Eugene
2023	12.24	Kendra Harrison (USA)	Budapest
2024	12.24	Ackera Nugent (JAM)	Rome
2025	12.17	Masai Russell (USA)	Miramar
2026	12.09	Masai Russell (USA)	Zurich
