= List of European Athletics Indoor Championships medalists (women) =

This is a complete list of women's medalists of the European Athletics Indoor Championships.

== 60 metres ==
Games	Gold	Silver	Bronze
1966 Dortmund	Margit Nemesházi (HUN)	Galina Mitrokhina (URS)	Mary Rand (GBR)
1967 Prague	Margit Nemesházi (HUN)	Karin Wallgren (SWE)	Galina Bukharina (URS)
1968 Madrid	Sylviane Telliez (FRA)	Erika Rost (FRG)	Hannelore Trabert (FRG)
1969 Belgrade	Irena Szewińska (POL)	Sylviane Telliez (FRA)	Madeleine Cobb (GBR)
1970 Vienna	Renate Meissner (GDR)	Sylviane Telliez (FRA)	Wilma van den Berg (NED)
1971 Sofia	Renate Stecher (GDR)	Sylviane Telliez (FRA)	Annegret Irrgang (FRG)
1972 Grenoble	Renate Stecher (GDR)	Annegret Richter (FRG)	Sylviane Telliez (FRA)
1973 Rotterdam	Annegret Richter (FRG)	Petra Vogt (GDR)	Sylviane Telliez (FRA)
1974 Gothenburg	Renate Stecher (GDR)	Andrea Lynch (GBR)	Irena Szewińska (POL)
1975 Katowice	Andrea Lynch (GBR)	Monika Meyer (GDR)	Irena Szewińska (POL)
1976 Munich	Linda Haglund (SWE)	Sonia Lannaman (GBR)	Elvira Possekel (FRG)
1977 San Sebastián	Marlies Oelsner (GDR)	Lyudmila Storozhkova (URS)	Rita Bottiglieri (ITA)
1978 Milan	Marlies Oelsner (GDR)	Linda Haglund (SWE)	Lyudmila Storozhkova (URS)
1979 Vienna	Marlies Göhr (GDR)	Marita Koch (GDR)	Lyudmila Storozhkova (URS)
1980 Sindelfingen	Sofka Popova (BUL)	Linda Haglund (SWE)	Lyudmila Kondratyeva (URS)
1981 Grenoble	Sofka Popova (BUL)	Linda Haglund (SWE)	Marita Koch (GDR)
1982 Milan	Marlies Göhr (GDR)	Sofka Popova (BUL)	Wendy Hoyte (GBR)
1983 Budapest	Marlies Göhr (GDR)	Silke Gladisch (GDR)	Marisa Masullo (ITA)
1984 Gothenburg	Beverly Kinch (GBR)	Anelia Nuneva (BUL)	Nelli Cooman (NED)
1985 Piraeus	Nelli Cooman (NED)	Marlies Göhr (GDR)	Heather Oakes (GBR)
1986 Madrid	Nelli Fiere-Cooman (NED)	Marlies Göhr (GDR)	Silke Gladisch (GDR)
1987 Liévin	Nelli Fiere-Cooman (NED)	Anelia Nuneva (BUL)	Marlies Göhr (GDR)
1988 Budapest	Nelli Fiere-Cooman (NED)	Silke Gladisch (GDR)	Marlies Göhr (GDR)
1989 The Hague	Nelli Fiere-Cooman (NED)	Laurence Bily (FRA)	Sisko Hanhijoki (FIN)
1990 Glasgow	Ulrike Sarvari (FRG)	Laurence Bily (FRA)	Nelli Fiere-Cooman (NED)
1992 Genoa	Zhanna Tarnopolskaya (EUN)	Anelia Nuneva (BUL)	Nadezhda Roshchupkina (EUN)
1994 Paris	Nelli Cooman (NED)	Melanie Paschke (GER)	Patricia Girard (FRA)
1996 Stockholm	Ekaterini Thanou (GRE)	Odiah Sidibé (FRA)	Jerneja Perc (SLO)
1998 Valencia	Melanie Paschke (GER)	Frederique Bangue (FRA)	Odiah Sidibé (FRA)
2000 Ghent	Ekaterini Thanou (GRE)	Petya Pendareva (BUL)	Irina Pukha (UKR)
2002 Vienna	Kim Gevaert (BEL)	Marina Kislova (RUS)	Georgia Kokloni (GRE)
2005 Madrid	Kim Gevaert (BEL)	Yeoryia Kokloni (GRE)	Maria Karastamati (GRE)
2007 Birmingham	Kim Gevaert (BEL)	Yevgeniya Polyakova (RUS)	Daria Onyśko (POL)
2009 Turin	Yevgeniya Polyakova (RUS)	Ezinne Okparaebo (NOR)	Verena Sailer (GER)
2011 Paris	Olesya Povh (UKR)	Mariya Ryemyen (UKR)	Ezinne Okparaebo (NOR)
2013 Gothenburg	Mariya Ryemyen (UKR)	Ivet Lalova (BUL)	Myriam Soumaré (FRA)
2015 Prague	Dafne Schippers (NED)	Dina Asher-Smith (GBR)	Verena Sailer (GER)
2017 Belgrade	Asha Philip (GBR)	Olesya Povh (UKR)	Ewa Swoboda (POL)
2019 Glasgow	Ewa Swoboda (POL)	Dafne Schippers (NED)	Asha Philip (GBR)
2021 Toruń	Ajla Del Ponte (SUI)	Lotta Kemppinen (FIN)	Jamile Samuel (NED)
2023 Istanbul	Mujinga Kambundji (SUI)	Ewa Swoboda (POL)	Daryll Neita (GBR)
2025 Apeldoorn	Zaynab Dosso (ITA)	Mujinga Kambundji (SUI)	Patrizia van der Weken (LUX)

== 400 metres ==
Games	Gold	Silver	Bronze
1966 Dortmund	Helga Henning (FRG)	Libuše Macounová (TCH)	Maeve Kyle (IRL)
1967 Prague	Karin Wallgren (SWE)	Lia Louer (NED)	Ljiljana Petnjarić (YUG)
1968 Madrid	Natalya Pechonkina (URS)	Gisela Köpke (FRG)	Tatyana Arnautova (URS)
1969 Belgrade	Colette Besson (FRA)	Christel Frese (FRG)	Rosemary Stirling (GBR)
1970 Vienna	Marilyn Neufville (GBR)	Christel Frese (FRG)	Colette Besson (FRA)
1971 Sofia	Vera Popkova (URS)	Inge Bödding (FRG)	Maria Sykora (AUT)
1972 Grenoble	Christel Frese (FRG)	Inge Bödding (FRG)	Erika Weinstein (FRG)
1973 Rotterdam	Verona Bernard (GBR)	Waltraud Dietsch (GDR)	Renate Siebach (GDR)
1974 Gothenburg	Jelica Pavličić (YUG)	Nadezhda Ilyina (URS)	Waltraud Dietsch (GDR)
1975 Katowice	Verona Elder (GBR)	Nadezhda Ilyina (URS)	Inta Kļimoviča (URS)
1976 Munich	Rita Wilden (FRG)	Jelica Pavličić (YUG)	Inta Kļimoviča (URS)
1977 San Sebastián	Marita Koch (GDR)	Verona Elder (GBR)	Jelica Pavličić (YUG)
1978 Milan	Marina Sidorova (URS)	Rita Bottiglieri (ITA)	Karoline Käfer (AUT)
1979 Vienna	Verona Elder (GBR)	Jarmila Kratochvílová (TCH)	Karoline Käfer (AUT)
1980 Sindelfingen	Elke Decker (FRG)	Karoline Käfer (AUT)	Tatyana Goyshchik (URS)
1981 Grenoble	Jarmila Kratochvílová (TCH)	Natalya Bochina (URS)	Verona Elder (GBR)
1982 Milan	Jarmila Kratochvílová (TCH)	Dagmar Rübsam (GDR)	Gaby Bußmann (FRG)
1983 Budapest	Jarmila Kratochvílová (TCH)	Kirsten Siemon (GDR)	Rositsa Stamenova (BUL)
1984 Gothenburg	Taťána Kocembová (TCH)	Erika Rossi (ITA)	Rositsa Stamenova (BUL)
1985 Piraeus	Sabine Busch (GDR)	Dagmar Neubauer (GDR)	Alena Bulířová (TCH)
1986 Madrid	Sabine Busch (GDR)	Petra Müller (GDR)	Ann-Louise Skoglund (SWE)
1987 Liévin	Mariya Pinigina (URS)	Gisela Kinzel (FRG)	Cristina Pérez (ESP)
1988 Budapest	Petra Müller (GDR)	Helga Arendt (FRG)	Dagmar Neubauer (GDR)
1989 The Hague	Sally Gunnell (GBR)	Marina Shmonina (URS)	Anita Protti (SUI)
1990 Glasgow	Marina Shmonina (URS)	Iolanda Oanță (ROU)	Judit Forgács (HUN)
1992 Genoa	Sandra Myers (ESP)	Olga Bryzgina (EUN)	Yelena Golesheva (EUN)
1994 Paris	Svetlana Goncharenko (RUS)	Tatyana Alekseyeva (RUS)	Viviane Dorsile (FRA)
1996 Stockholm	Grit Breuer (GER)	Olga Kotlyarova (RUS)	Tatyana Chebykina (RUS)
1998 Valencia	Grit Breuer (GER)	Ionela Târlea (ROU)	Helena Fuchsová (CZE)
2000 Ghent	Svetlana Pospelova (RUS)	Natalya Nazarova (RUS)	Helena Fuchsová (CZE)
2002 Vienna	Natalya Antyukh (RUS)	Claudia Marx (GER)	Karen Shinkins (IRL)
2005 Madrid	Svetlana Pospelova (RUS)	Svetlana Usovich (BLR)	Irina Rosikhina (RUS)
2007 Birmingham	Nicola Sanders (GBR)	Ilona Usovich (BLR)	Olesya Zykina (RUS)
2009 Turin	Antonina Krivoshapka (RUS)	Nataliya Pyhyda (UKR)	Darya Safonova (RUS)
2011 Paris	Denisa Rosolová (CZE)	Olesya Krasnomovets (RUS)	Kseniya Zadorina (RUS)
2013 Gothenburg	Perri Shakes-Drayton (GBR)	Eilidh Child (GBR)	Moa Hjelmer (SWE)
2015 Prague	Nataliya Pyhyda (UKR)	Indira Terrero (ESP)	Seren Bundy-Davies (GBR)
2017 Belgrade	Floria Gueï (FRA)	Zuzana Hejnová (CZE)	Justyna Święty (POL)
2019 Glasgow	Léa Sprunger (SUI)	Cynthia Bolingo Mbongo (BEL)	Lisanne de Witte (NED)
2021 Toruń	Femke Bol (NED)	Justyna Święty-Ersetic (POL)	Jodie Williams (GBR)
2023 Istanbul	Femke Bol (NED)	Lieke Klaver (NED)	Anna Kiełbasińska (POL)
2025 Apeldoorn	Lieke Klaver (NED)	Henriette Jæger (NOR)	Paula Sevilla (ESP)

== 800 metres ==
Games	Gold	Silver	Bronze
1966 Dortmund	Zsuzsa Szabó-Nagy (HUN)	Karin Keßler (FRG)	Marie Ingrová (TCH)
1967 Prague	Karin Keßler (FRG)	Maryvonne Dupureur (FRA)	Valentina Lukyanova (URS)
1968 Madrid	Karin Burneleit (GDR)	Alla Kolesnikova (URS)	Valentina Lukyanova (URS)
1969 Belgrade	Barbara Wieck (GDR)	Magdolna Kulcsár (HUN)	Anna Zimina (URS)
1970 Vienna	Maria Sykora (AUT)	Lyudmila Bragina (URS)	Zofia Kołakowska (POL)
1971 Sofia	Hildegard Falck (FRG)	Ileana Silai (ROU)	Rosemary Stirling (GBR)
1972 Grenoble	Gunhild Hoffmeister (GDR)	Ileana Silai (ROU)	Svetla Zlateva (BUL)
1973 Rotterdam	Stefka Yordanova (BUL)	Elfi Rost (GDR)	Elżbieta Skowrońska (POL)
1974 Gothenburg	Elżbieta Katolik (POL)	Gisela Ellenberger (FRG)	Gunhild Hoffmeister (GDR)
1975 Katowice	Anita Barkusky (GDR)	Sarmīte Štūla (URS)	Rositsa Pekhlivanova (BUL)
1976 Munich	Nikolina Shtereva (BUL)	Lilyana Tomova (BUL)	Gisela Klein (FRG)
1977 San Sebastián	Jane Colebrook (GBR)	Totka Petrova (BUL)	Elżbieta Katolik (POL)
1978 Milan	Ulrike Bruns (GDR)	Totka Petrova (BUL)	Mariana Suman (ROU)
1979 Vienna	Nikolina Shtereva (BUL)	Anita Weiß (GDR)	Fiţa Lovin (ROU)
1980 Sindelfingen	Jolanta Januchta (POL)	Anne-Marie Van Nuffel (BEL)	Liz Barnes (GBR)
1981 Grenoble	Hildegard Ullrich (GDR)	Svetla Zlateva (BUL)	Nikolina Shtereva (BUL)
1982 Milan	Doina Melinte (ROU)	Martina Steuk (GDR)	Jolanta Januchta (POL)
1983 Budapest	Svetlana Kitova (URS)	Zuzana Moravčíková (TCH)	Olga Simanova (URS)
1984 Gothenburg	Milena Matějkovičová (TCH)	Doina Melinte (ROU)	Cristieana Cojocaru (ROU)
1985 Piraeus	Ella Kovacs (ROU)	Nadiya Olizarenko (URS)	Cristieana Cojocaru (ROU)
1986 Madrid	Sigrun Ludwigs (GDR)	Cristieana Cojocaru (ROU)	Slobodanka Čolović (YUG)
1987 Liévin	Christine Wachtel (GDR)	Sigrun Wodars (GDR)	Lyubov Kiryukhina (FRG)
1988 Budapest	Sabine Zwiener (FRG)	Olga Nelyubova (URS)	Gabi Lesch (FRG)
1989 The Hague	Doina Melinte (ROU)	Ellen Kiessling (GDR)	Tatyana Grebenchuk (URS)
1990 Glasgow	Lyubov Gurina (URS)	Sabine Zwiener (FRG)	Lorraine Baker (GBR)
1992 Genoa	Ella Kovacs (ROU)	Inna Yevseyeva (EUN)	Yelena Afanasyeva (EUN)
1994 Paris	Natalya Dukhnova (BLR)	Ella Kovacs (ROU)	Carla Sacramento (POR)
1996 Stockholm	Patricia Djaté-Taillard (FRA)	Stella Jongmans (NED)	Svetlana Masterkova (RUS)
1998 Valencia	Ludmila Formanová (CZE)	Malin Ewerlöf (SWE)	Judit Varga (HUN)
2000 Ghent	Stephanie Graf (AUT)	Natalya Tsyganova (RUS)	Sandra Stals (BEL)
2002 Vienna	Jolanda Čeplak (SLO)	Stephanie Graf (AUT)	Élisabeth Grousselle (FRA)
2005 Madrid	Larisa Chzhao (RUS)	Mayte Martínez (ESP)	Natalya Tsyganova (RUS)
2007 Birmingham	Oksana Zbrozhek (RUS)	Tetyana Petlyuk (UKR)	Jolanda Čeplak (SLO)
2009 Turin	Mariya Savinova (RUS)	Oksana Zbrozhek (RUS)	Elisa Cusma Piccione (ITA)
2011 Paris	Jenny Meadows (GBR)	Linda Marguet (FRA)	Marilyn Okoro (GBR)
2013 Gothenburg	Nataliya Lupu (UKR)	Yelena Kotulskaya (RUS)	Maryna Arzamasova (BLR)
2015 Prague	Selina Büchel (SUI)	Yekaterina Poistogova (RUS)	Nataliya Lupu (UKR)
2017 Belgrade	Selina Büchel (SUI)	Shelayna Oskan-Clarke (GBR)	Anita Hinkrisdottir (ISL)
2019 Glasgow	Shelayna Oskan-Clarke (GBR)	Rénelle Lamote (FRA)	Olha Lyakhova (UKR)
2021 Toruń	Keely Hodgkinson (GBR)	Joanna Jóźwik (POL)	Angelika Cichocka (POL)
2023 Istranbul	Keely Hodgkinson (GBR)	Anita Horvat (SLO)	Agnès Raharolahy (FRA)
2025 Apeldoorn	Anna Wielgosz (POL)	Clara Liberman (FRA)	Anita Horvat (SLO)

== 1500 metres ==
Games	Gold	Silver	Bronze
1971 Sofia	Margaret Beacham (GBR)	Lyudmila Bragina (URS)	Tamara Pangelova (URS)
1972 Grenoble	Tamara Pangelova (URS)	Lyudmila Bragina (URS)	Vasilena Amzina (BUL)
1973 Rotterdam	Ellen Tittel (FRG)	Tonka Petrova (BUL)	Iris Claus (GDR)
1974 Gothenburg	Tonka Petrova (BUL)	Karin Krebs (GDR)	Tamara Kazachkova (URS)
1975 Katowice	Natalia Andrei (ROU)	Tatyana Kazankina (URS)	Ellen Wellmann (FRG)
1976 Munich	Brigitte Kraus (FRG)	Natalia Mărășescu (ROU)	Rositsa Pekhlivanova (BUL)
1977 San Sebastián	Mary Stewart (GBR)	Vesela Yatsinska (BUL)	Rumyana Chavdarova (BUL)
1978 Milan	Ileana Silai (ROU)	Natalia Mărășescu (ROU)	Brigitte Kraus (FRG)
1979 Vienna	Natalia Mărășescu (ROU)	Zamira Zaytseva (URS)	Svetlana Guskova (URS)
1980 Sindelfingen	Tamara Koba (URS)	Anna Bukis (POL)	Mary Purcell (IRL)
1981 Grenoble	Agnese Possamai (ITA)	Valentina Ilyinykh (URS)	Lyubov Smolka (URS)
1982 Milan	Gabriella Dorio (ITA)	Brigitte Kraus (FRG)	Beate Liebich (GDR)
1983 Budapest	Brigitte Kraus (FRG)	Maria Radu (ROU)	Ivana Kleinová (TCH)
1984 Gothenburg	Fiţa Lovin (ROU)	Elly van Hulst (NED)	Sandra Gasser (SUI)
1985 Piraeus	Doina Melinte (ROU)	Fiţa Lovin (ROU)	Brigitte Kraus (FRG)
1986 Madrid	Svetlana Kitova (URS)	Tatyana Lebonda (URS)	Mitica Junghiatu (ROU)
1987 Liévin	Sandra Gasser (SUI)	Svetlana Kitova (URS)	Ivana Kubešová (TCH)
1988 Budapest	Doina Melinte (ROU)	Mitiță Constantin (ROU)	Brigitte Kraus (FRG)
1989 The Hague	Paula Ivan (ROU)	Marina Yachmenyova (URS)	Svetlana Kitova (URS)
1990 Glasgow	Doina Melinte (ROU)	Sandra Gasser (SUI)	Violeta Beclea (ROU)
1992 Genoa	Yekaterina Podkopayeva (EUN)	Lyubov Kremlyova (EUN)	Doina Melinte (ROU)
1994 Paris	Yekaterina Podkopayeva (RUS)	Lyudmila Rogachova (RUS)	Małgorzata Rydz (POL)
1996 Stockholm	Carla Sacramento (POR)	Yekaterina Podkopayeva (RUS)	Małgorzata Rydz (POL)
1998 Valencia	Theresia Kiesl (AUT)	Lidia Chojecka (POL)	Violeta Szekely (ROU)
2000 Ghent	Violeta Szekely (ROU)	Olga Kuznetsova (RUS)	Yuliya Kosenkova (RUS)
2002 Vienna	Yekaterina Puzanova (RUS)	Elena Iagăr (ROU)	Alesia Turava (BLR)
2005 Madrid	Elena Iagăr (ROU)	Corina Dumbravean (ROU)	Hind Dehiba (FRA)
2007 Birmingham	Lidia Chojecka (POL)	Natalya Pantelyeva (RUS)	Olesya Chumakova (RUS)
2009 Turin	Natalia Rodríguez (ESP)	Sonja Roman (SLO)	Roísín McGettigan (IRL)
2011 Paris	Elena Arzhakova (RUS)	Nuria Fernández (ESP)	Yekaterina Martynova (RUS)
2013 Gothenburg	Abeba Aregawi (SWE)	Isabel Macías (ESP)	Katarzyna Broniatowska (POL)
2015 Prague	Sifan Hassan (NED)	Angelika Cichocka (POL)	Federica Del Buono (ITA)
2017 Belgrade	Laura Muir (GBR)	Konstanze Klosterhalfen (GER)	Sofia Ennaoui (POL)
2019 Glasgow	Laura Muir (GBR)	Sofia Ennaoui (POL)	Ciara Mageean (IRL)
2021 Toruń	Elise Vanderelst (BEL)	Holly Archer (GBR)	Hanna Klein (GER)
2023 Istanbul	Laura Muir (GBR)	Claudia Bobocea (ROU)	Sofia Ennaoui (POL)
2025 Apeldoorn	Agathe Guillemot (FRA)	Salomé Afonso (POR)	Revée Walcott-Nolan (GBR)

== 3000 metres ==
Games	Gold	Silver	Bronze
1982 Milan	Agnese Possamai (ITA)	Maricica Puică (ROU)	Paula Fudge (GBR)
1983 Budapest	Yelena Sipatova (URS)	Agnese Possamai (ITA)	Yelena Malykhina (URS)
1984 Gothenburg	Brigitte Kraus (FRG)	Tatyana Pozdnyakova (URS)	Ivana Kleinová (TCH)
1985 Piraeus	Agnese Possamai (ITA)	Olga Bondarenko (URS)	Yvonne Murray (GBR)
1986 Madrid	Ines Bibernell (GDR)	Yvonne Murray (GBR)	Regina Chistyakova (URS)
1987 Liévin	Yvonne Murray (GBR)	Elly van Hulst (NED)	Brigitte Kraus (FRG)
1988 Budapest	Elly van Hulst (NED)	Vera Michallek (FRG)	Wendy Sly (GBR)
1989 The Hague	Elly van Hulst (NED)	Nicky Morris (GBR)	Maricica Puică (ROU)
1990 Glasgow	Elly van Hulst (NED)	Margareta Keszeg (ROU)	Andrea Hahmann (GDR)
1992 Genoa	Margareta Keszeg (ROU)	Alina Ivanova (EUN)	Rita Marquard (GER)
1994 Paris	Fernanda Ribeiro (POR)	Margareta Keszeg (ROU)	Anna Brzezińska (POL)
1996 Stockholm	Fernanda Ribeiro (POR)	Sara Wedlund (SWE)	Marta Domínguez (ESP)
1998 Valencia	Gabriela Szabo (ROU)	Fernanda Ribeiro (POR)	Marta Domínguez (ESP)
2000 Ghent	Gabriela Szabo (ROU)	Lidia Chojecka (POL)	Marta Domínguez (ESP)
2002 Vienna	Marta Domínguez (ESP)	Carla Sacramento (POR)	Yelena Zadorozhnaya (RUS)
2005 Madrid	Lidia Chojecka (POL)	Susanne Pumper (AUT)	Sabrina Mockenhaupt (GER)
2007 Birmingham	Lidia Chojecka (POL)	Marta Domínguez (ESP)	Silvia Weissteiner (ITA)
2009 Turin	Alemitu Bekele (TUR)	Sara Moreira (POR)	Mary Cullen (IRL)
2011 Paris	Helen Clitheroe (GBR)	Lidia Chojecka (POL)	Layes Abdullayeva (AZE)
2013 Gothenburg	Sara Moreira (POR)	Corinna Harrer (GER)	Fionnuala Britton (IRL)
2015 Prague	Yelena Korobkina (RUS)	Sviatlana Kudzelich (BLR)	Maureen Koster (NED)
2017 Belgrade	Laura Muir (GBR)	Yasemin Can (TUR)	Eilish McColgan (GBR)
2019 Glasgow	Laura Muir (GBR)	Konstanze Klosterhalfen (GER)	Melissa Courtney (GBR)
2021 Toruń	Amy-Eloise Markovc (GBR)	Alice Finot (FRA)	Verity Ockenden (GBR)
2023 Istanbul	Hanna Klein (GER)	Konstanze Klosterhalfen (GER)	Melissa Courtney-Bryant (GBR)
2025 Apeldoorn	Sarah Healy (IRL)	Melissa Courtney-Bryant (GBR)	Salomé Afonso (POR)

== 60 metres hurdles ==
Games	Gold	Silver	Bronze
1966 Dortmund	Irina Press (URS)	Gundula Diel (GDR)	Inge Schell (FRG)
1967 Prague	Karin Balzer (GDR)	Vlasta Seifertová (TCH)	Inge Schell (FRG)
1968 Madrid	Karin Balzer (GDR)	Bärbel Weidlich (GDR)	Liudmila Ievleva (URS)
1969 Belgrade	Karin Balzer (GDR)	Meta Antenen (SUI)	Christine Perera (GBR)
1970 Vienna	Karin Balzer (GDR)	Liya Khitrina (URS)	Teresa Sukniewicz (POL)
1971 Sofia	Karin Balzer (GDR)	Annelie Ehrhardt (GDR)	Teresa Sukniewicz (POL)
1972 Grenoble	Annelie Ehrhardt (GDR)	Teresa Sukniewicz (POL)	Grażyna Rabsztyn (POL); Meta Antenen (SUI)
1973 Rotterdam	Annelie Ehrhardt (GDR)	Valeria Bufanu (ROU)	Teresa Nowak (POL)
1974 Gothenburg	Annerose Fiedler (GDR)	Grażyna Rabsztyn (POL)	Meta Antenen (SUI)
1975 Katowice	Grażyna Rabsztyn (POL)	Annerose Fiedler (GDR)	Tatyana Anisimova (URS)
1976 Munich	Grażyna Rabsztyn (POL)	Natalya Lebedeva (URS)	Bożena Nowakowska (POL)
1977 San Sebastián	Lyubov Nikitenko (URS)	Zofia Filip (POL)	Rita Bottiglieri (ITA)
1978 Milan	Johanna Klier (GDR)	Grażyna Rabsztyn (POL)	Silvia Kempin (GDR)
1979 Vienna	Danuta Perka (POL)	Grażyna Rabsztyn (POL)	Nina Morgulina (URS)
1980 Sindelfingen	Zofia Bielczyk (POL)	Grażyna Rabsztyn (POL)	Natalya Lebedeva (URS)
1981 Grenoble	Zofia Bielczyk (POL)	Maria Kemenchezhi (URS)	Tatyana Anisimova (URS)
1982 Milan	Kerstin Knabe (GDR)	Bettine Gärtz (GDR)	Yordanka Donkova (BUL)
1983 Budapest	Bettine Jahn (GDR)	Kerstin Knabe (GDR)	Tatyana Malyuvanyets (URS)
1984 Gothenburg	Lucyna Kałek (POL)	Vera Akimova (URS)	Yordanka Donkova (BUL)
1985 Piraeus	Cornelia Oschkenat (GDR)	Ginka Zagorcheva (BUL)	Anne Piquereau (FRA)
1986 Madrid	Cornelia Oschkenat (GDR)	Anne Piquereau (FRA)	Kerstin Knabe (GDR)
1987 Liévin	Yordanka Donkova (BUL)	Gloria Uibel (GDR)	Ginka Zagorcheva (BUL)
1988 Budapest	Cornelia Oschkenat (GDR)	Marjan Olyslager (NED)	Mihaela Pogacian (ROU)
1989 The Hague	Yordanka Donkova (BUL)	Ludmila Narozhilenko (URS)	Gabriele Lippe (FRG)
1990 Glasgow	Ludmila Narozhilenko (URS)	Monique Tourret (FRA)	Mihaela Pogacian (ROU)
1992 Genoa	Ludmila Narozhilenko (EUN)	Monique Ewanje-Epée (FRA)	Yordanka Donkova (BUL)
1994 Paris	Yordanka Donkova (BUL)	Eva Sokolova (RUS)	Anne Piquereau (FRA)
1996 Stockholm	Patricia Girard-Leno (FRA)	Brigita Bukovec (SLO)	Monique Tourret (FRA)
1998 Valencia	Patricia Girard (FRA)	Svetlana Laukhova (RUS)	Diane Allahgreen (GBR)
2000 Ghent	Linda Ferga (FRA)	Patricia Girard (FRA)	Olena Krasovska (UKR)
2002 Vienna	Linda Ferga (FRA)	Kirsten Bolm (GER)	Patricia Girard (FRA)
2005 Madrid	Susanna Kallur (SWE)	Jenny Kallur (SWE)	Kirsten Bolm (GER)
2007 Birmingham	Susanna Kallur (SWE)	Aleksandra Antonova (RUS)	Kirsten Bolm (GER)
2009 Turin	Eline Berings (BEL)	Lucie Škrobáková (CZE)	Derval O'Rourke (IRL)
2011 Paris	Carolin Nytra (GER)	Tiffany Ofili (GBR)	Christina Vukicevic (NOR)
2013 Birmingham	Alina Talay (BLR)	Veronica Borsi (ITA)	Derval O'Rourke (IRL)
2015 Prague	Alina Talay (BLR)	Lucy Hatton (GBR)	Serita Solomon (GBR)
2017 Belgrade	Cindy Roleder (GER)	Alina Talay (BLR)	Pamela Dutkiewicz (GER)
2019 Glasgow	Nadine Visser (NED)	Cindy Roleder (GER)	Elvira Herman (BLR)
2021 Toruń	Nadine Visser (NED)	Cindy Sember (GBR)	Tiffany Porter (GBR)
2023 Istanbul	Reetta Hurske (FIN)	Nadine Visser (NED)	Ditaji Kambundji (SUI)
2025 Apeldoorn	Ditaji Kambundji (SUI)	Nadine Visser (NED)	Pia Skrzyszowska (POL)

== 4 × 400 metres relay ==
Games	Gold	Silver	Bronze
2000 Ghent	Russia; Olesya Zykina; Irina Rosikhina; Yuliya Sotnikova; Svetlana Pospelova	Italy; Francesca Carbone; Carla Barbarino; Patrizia Spuri; Virna De Angeli	Romania; Georgeta Lazar; Anca Safta; Otilia Ruicu; Alina Rîpanu
2002 Vienna	Belarus; Yekaterina Stankevich; Iryna Khliustava; Anna Kozak; Sviatlana Usovich	Poland; Anna Pacholak; Aneta Lemiesz; Anna Zagórska; Grażyna Prokopek	Italy; Daniela Reina; Patrizia Spuri; Carla Barbarino; Danielle Perpoli
2005 Madrid	Russia; Tatyana Levina; Yuliya Pechonkina; Irina Rosikhina; Svetlana Pospelova	Poland; Anna Pacholak; Monika Bejnar; Marta Chrust-Rożej; Małgorzata Pskit	Great Britain; Melanie Purkiss; Donna Fraser; Catherine Murphy; Lee McConnell
2007 Birmingham	Belarus; Yulianna Yuschanka; Iryna Khliustava; Sviatlana Usovich; Ilona Usovich	Russia; Olesya Zykina; Natalia Ivanova; Zhanna Kashcheyeva; Natalya Antyukh	Great Britain; Emma Duck; Nicola Sanders; Kim Wall; Lee McConnell
2009 Turin	Russia; Darya Safonova; Yelena Voynova; Antonina Krivoshapka; Natalya Antyukh	Great Britain; Donna Fraser; Kim Wall; Vicki Barr; Marilyn Okoro	Belarus; Alena Kievich; Katsiaryna Bobryk; Hanna Tashpulatava; Katsiaryna Mishyna
2011 Paris	Russia; Kseniya Zadorina; Kseniya Vdovina; Yelena Migunova; Olesya Forsheva	Great Britain; Kelly Sotherton; Lee McConnell; Jenny Meadows; Marilyn Okoro	France; Muriel Hurtis-Houairi; Laetitia Denis; Marie Gayot; Floria Gueï
2013 Gothenburg	Great Britain; Eilidh Child; Shana Cox; Christine Ohuruogu; Perri Shakes-Drayton	Russia; Olga Tovarnova; Tatyana Veshkurova; Nadezhda Kotlyarova; Kseniya Zadorina	Czech Republic; Denisa Rosolová; Jitka Bartoničková; Lenka Masná; Zuzana Hejnová
2015 Prague	France; Floria Gueï; Elea-Mariama Diarra; Agnès Raharolahy; Marie Gayot	Great Britain; Kelly Massey; Seren Bundy-Davies; Laura Maddox; Kirsten McAslan	Poland; Joanna Linkiewicz; Małgorzata Hołub; Monika Szczęsna; Justyna Święty
2017 Belgrade	Poland; Patrycja Wyciszkiewicz; Iga Baumgart; Małgorzata Hołub; Justyna Święty	Great Britain; Eilidh Doyle; Mary Iheke; Philippa Lowe; Laviai Nielsen	Ukraine; Olha Bibik; Tetyana Melnyk; Anastasiya Bryzhina; Olha Lyakhova
2019 Glasgow	Poland; Anna Kiełbasińska; Iga Baumgart-Witan; Małgorzata Hołub-Kowalik; Justyna Święty-Ersetic	Great Britain; Laviai Nielsen; Zoey Clark; Amber Anning; Eilidh Doyle	Italy; Raphaela Boaheng Lukudo; Ayomide Folorunso; Chiara Bazzoni; Marta Milani
2021 Toruń	Netherlands; Lieke Klaver; Marit Dopheide; Lisanne de Witte; Femke Bol	Great Britain; Zoey Clark; Jodie Williams; Ama Pipi; Jessie Knight	Poland; Natalia Kaczmarek; Kornelia Lesiewicz; Małgorzata Hołub-Kowalik; Aleksandra Gaworska
2023 Istanbul	Netherlands; Lieke Klaver; Eveline Saalberg; Cathelijn Peeters; Femke Bol	Italy; Alice Mangione; Ayomide Folorunso; Anna Polinari; Eleonora Marchiando	Poland; Anna Kiełbasińska; Marika Popowicz-Drapała; Alicja Wrona-Kutrzepa; Anna Pałys
2025 Apeldoorn	Netherlands; Lieke Klaver; Nina Franke; Cathelijn Peeters; Femke Bol	Great Britain; Lina Nielsen; Hannah Kelly; Emily Newnham; Amber Anning	Czech Republic; Lada Vondrová; Nikoleta Jíchová; Tereza Petržilková; Lurdes Gloria Manuel

== High jump ==
Games	Gold	Silver	Bronze
1966 Dortmund	Iolanda Balaș (ROU)	Olga Gere-Pulić (YUG)	Ilia Hans (FRG)
1967 Prague	Taisiya Chenchik (URS)	Linda Knowles (GBR)	Jaroslava Králová (TCH)
1968 Madrid	Rita Schmidt (GDR)	Virginia Bonci (ROU)	Antonina Okorokova (URS)
1969 Belgrade	Rita Schmidt (GDR)	Yordanka Blagoeva (BUL)	Antonina Lazareva (URS)
1970 Vienna	Ilona Gusenbauer (AUT)	Cornelia Popescu (ROU)	Rita Schmidt (GDR)
1971 Sofia	Milada Karbanová (TCH)	Vera Gavrilova (URS)	Cornelia Popescu (ROU)
1972 Grenoble	Rita Schmidt (GDR)	Rita Gildemeister (GDR)	Yordanka Blagoeva (BUL)
1973 Rotterdam	Yordanka Blagoeva (BUL)	Rita Gildemeister (GDR)	Milada Karbanová (TCH)
1974 Gothenburg	Rosemarie Witschas (GDR)	Milada Karbanová (TCH)	Rita Kirst (GDR)
1975 Katowice	Rosemarie Ackermann (GDR)	Marie-Christine Debourse (FRA)	Annemieke Bouma (NED)
1976 Munich	Rosemarie Ackermann (GDR)	Ulrike Meyfarth (FRG)	Milada Karbanová (TCH)
1977 San Sebastián	Sara Simeoni (ITA)	Brigitte Holzapfel (FRG)	Edit Sámuel (HUN)
1978 Milan	Sara Simeoni (ITA)	Brigitte Holzapfel (FRG)	Urszula Kielan (POL)
1979 Vienna	Andrea Mátay (HUN)	Urszula Kielan (POL)	Ulrike Meyfarth (FRG)
1980 Sindelfingen	Sara Simeoni (ITA)	Andrea Mátay (HUN)	Urszula Kielan (POL)
1981 Grenoble	Sara Simeoni (ITA)	Elżbieta Krawczuk (POL)	Urszula Kielan (POL)
1982 Milan	Ulrike Meyfarth (FRG)	Andrea Bienias (GDR)	Katalin Sterk (HUN)
1983 Budapest	Tamara Bykova (URS)	Larisa Kositsyna (URS)	Maryse Ewanjé-Epée (FRA)
1984 Gothenburg	Ulrike Meyfarth (FRG)	Maryse Ewanjé-Epée (FRA)	Danuta Bułkowska (POL)
1985 Piraeus	Stefka Kostadinova (BUL)	Susanne Helm (GDR)	Danuta Bułkowska (POL)
1986 Madrid	Andrea Bienias (GDR)	Gabriele Günz (GDR)	Larisa Kositsyna (URS)
1987 Liévin	Stefka Kostadinova (BUL)	Tamara Bykova (URS)	Susanne Beyer (GDR); Elżbieta Trylińska (POL)
1988 Budapest	Stefka Kostadinova (BUL)	Heike Redetzky (FRG)	Larisa Kositsyna (URS)
1989 The Hague	Alina Astafei (ROU)	Hanne Haugland (NOR)	Maryse Ewanjé-Epée (FRA)
1990 Glasgow	Heike Redetzky (FRG)	Britta Vörös (GDR)	Alina Astafei (ROU)
1992 Genoa	Heike Henkel (FRG)	Stefka Kostadinova (BUL)	Yelena Yelesina (EUN)
1994 Paris	Stefka Kostadinova (BUL)	Desislava Aleksandrova (BUL)	Sigrid Kirchmann (AUT)
1996 Stockholm	Alina Astafei (GER)	Níki Bakogiánni (GRE)	Olga Bolşova (MDA)
1998 Valencia	Monica Iagar (ROM)	Alina Astafei (GER)	Yelena Yelesina (RUS)
2000 Ghent	Kajsa Bergqvist (SWE)	Zuzana Hlavoňová (CZE)	Olga Kaliturina (RUS)
2002 Vienna	Marina Kuptsova (RUS)	Dóra Győrffy (HUN); Kajsa Bergqvist (SWE)	—
2005 Madrid	Anna Chicherova (RUS)	Ruth Beitia (ESP)	Venelina Veneva (BUL)
2007 Birmingham	Tia Hellebaut (BEL)	Antonietta Di Martino (ITA)	Ruth Beitia (ESP)
2009 Turin	Ariane Friedrich (GER)	Ruth Beitia (ESP)	Viktoriya Klyugina (RUS)
2011 Paris	Antonietta Di Martino (ITA)	Ruth Beitia (ESP)	Ebba Jungmark (SWE)
2013 Gothenburg	Ruth Beitia (ESP)	Ebba Jungmark (SWE)	Emma Green Tregaro (SWE)
2015 Prague	Mariya Kuchina (RUS)	Alessia Trost (ITA)	Kamila Lićwinko (POL)
2017 Belgrade	Airine Palsyte (LTU)	Ruth Beitia (ESP)	Yuliya Levchenko (UKR)
2019 Glasgow	Mariya Lasitskene (ANA)	Yuliya Levchenko (UKR)	Airine Palsyte (LTU)
2021 Toruń	Yaroslava Mahuchikh (UKR)	Iryna Herashchenko (UKR)	Ella Junnila (FIN)
2023 Istanbul	Yaroslava Mahuchikh (UKR)	Britt Weerman (NED)	Kateryna Tabashnyk (UKR)
2025 Apeldoorn	Yaroslava Mahuchikh (UKR)	Angelina Topić (SER)	Engla Nilsson (SWE)

== Long jump ==
Games	Gold	Silver	Bronze
1966 Dortmund	Tatyana Shchelkanova (URS)	Mary Rand (GBR)	Heide Rosendahl (FRG)
1967 Prague	Berit Berthelsen (NOR)	Heide Rosendahl (FRG)	Viorica Viscopoleanu (ROU)
1968 Madrid	Berit Berthelsen (NOR)	Bärbel Löhnert (GDR)	Viorica Viscopoleanu (ROU)
1969 Belgrade	Irena Szewińska (POL)	Sue Scott (GBR)	Meta Antenen (SUI)
1970 Vienna	Viorica Viscopoleanu (ROM)	Heide Rosendahl (FRG)	Mirosława Sarna (POL)
1971 Sofia	Heide Rosendahl (FRG)	Irena Szewińska (POL)	Viorica Viscopoleanu (ROM)
1972 Grenoble	Brigitte Roesen (FRG)	Meta Antenen (SUI)	Jarmila Nygrýnová (TCH)
1973 Rotterdam	Diana Yorgova (BUL)	Jarmila Nygrýnová (TCH)	Mirosława Sarna (POL)
1974 Gothenburg	Meta Antenen (SUI)	Angela Schmalfeld (GDR)	Valeria Stefanescu (ROM)
1975 Katowice	Dorina Catineanu (ROM)	Lidiya Alfeyeva (URS)	Meta Antenen (SUI)
1976 Munich	Lidiya Alfeyeva (URS)	Jarmila Nygrýnová (TCH)	Galina Gopchenko (URS)
1977 San Sebastián	Jarmila Nygrýnová (TCH)	Ildikó Erdélyi (HUN)	Heidemarie Wycisk (GDR)
1978 Milan	Jarmila Nygrýnová (TCH)	Ildikó Erdélyi (HUN)	Sue Reeve (GBR)
1979 Vienna	Siegrun Siegl (GDR)	Jarmila Nygrýnová (TCH)	Lena Johansson (SWE)
1980 Sindelfingen	Anna Włodarczyk (POL)	Anke Weigt (FRG)	Sabine Everts (FRG)
1981 Grenoble	Karin Hänel (FRG)	Sigrid Heimann (GDR)	Jasmin Fischer (FRG)
1982 Milan	Sabine Everts (FRG)	Karin Hänel (FRG)	Valy Ionescu (ROU)
1983 Budapest	Eva Murková (TCH)	Helga Radtke (GDR)	Heike Daute (GDR)
1984 Gothenburg	Susan Hearnshaw (GBR)	Eva Murková (TCH)	Stefania Lazzaroni (ITA)
1985 Piraeus	Galina Chistyakova (URS)	Eva Murková (TCH)	Heike Drechsler (GDR)
1986 Madrid	Heike Drechsler (GDR)	Helga Radtke (GDR)	Yelena Kokonova (URS)
1987 Liévin	Heike Drechsler (GDR)	Galina Chistyakova (URS)	Yelena Belevskaya (URS)
1988 Budapest	Heike Drechsler (GDR)	Galina Chistyakova (URS)	Jolanta Bartczak (POL)
1989 The Hague	Galina Chistyakova (URS)	Yolanda Chen (URS)	Ringa Ropo-Junnila (FIN)
1990 Glasgow	Galina Chistyakova (URS)	Yelena Khlopotnova (URS)	Helga Radtke (GDR)
1992 Genoa	Larysa Berezhna	Marieta Ilcu (ROU)	Ljudmila Ninova (AUT)
1994 Paris	Heike Drechsler (GER)	Ljudmila Ninova (AUT)	Inessa Kravets (UKR)
1996 Stockholm	Renata Nielsen (DEN)	Yelena Sinchukova (RUS)	Claudia Gerhardt (GER)
1998 Valencia	Fiona May (ITA)	Tatyana Ter-Mesrobyan (RUS)	Linda Ferga (FRA)
2000 Ghent	Erica Johansson (SWE)	Heike Drechsler (GER)	Iva Prandzheva (BUL)
2002 Vienna	Niki Xanthou (GRE)	Olga Rublyova (RUS)	Lyudmila Galkina (RUS)
2005 Madrid	Naide Gomes (POR)	Stiliani Pilatou (GRE)	Adina Anton (ROU); Bianca Kappler (GER)
2007 Birmingham	Naide Gomes (POR)	Concepción Montaner (ESP)	Denisa Šcerbová (CZE)
2009 Turin	Ksenija Balta (EST)	Yelena Sokolova (RUS)	Olga Kucherenko (RUS)
2011 Paris	Darya Klishina (RUS)	Naide Gomes (POR)	Yuliya Pidluzhnaya (RUS)
2013 Gothenburg	Darya Klishina (RUS)	Éloyse Lesueur (FRA)	Erica Jarder (SWE)
2015 Prague	Ivana Španović (SRB)	Sosthene Taroum Moguenara (GER)	Florentina Marincu (ROU)
2017 Belgrade	Ivana Španović (SRB)	Lorraine Ugen (GBR)	Claudia Salman-Rath (GER)
2019 Glasgow	Ivana Španović (SRB)	Nastassia Mironchyk-Ivanova (BLR)	Maryna Bekh-Romanchuk (UKR)
2021 Toruń	Maryna Bekh-Romanchuk (UKR)	Malaika Mihambo (GER)	Khaddi Sagnia (SWE)
2023 Istanbul	Jazmin Sawyers (GBR)	Larissa Iapichino (ITA)	Ivana Vuleta (SRB)
2025 Apeldoorn	Larissa Iapichino (ITA)	Annik Kälin (SUI)	Malaika Mihambo (GER)

== Triple jump ==
Games	Gold	Silver	Bronze
1990 Glasgow	Galina Chistyakova (URS)	Helga Radtke (GDR)	Ana Isabel Oliveira (POR)
1992 Genoa	Inessa Kravets (EUN)	Sofiya Bozhanova (BUL)	Helga Radtke (GER)
1994 Paris	Inna Lasovskaya (RUS)	Anna Biryukova (RUS)	Sofiya Bozhanova (BUL)
1996 Stockholm	Iva Prandzheva (BUL)	Šárka Kašpárková (CZE)	Olga Vasdeki (GRE)
1998 Valencia	Ashia Hansen (GBR)	Šárka Kašpárková (CZE)	Yelena Lebedenko (RUS)
2000 Ghent	Tatyana Lebedeva (RUS)	Cristina Nicolau (ROU)	Iva Prandzheva (BUL)
2002 Vienna	Tereza Marinova (BUL)	Ashia Hansen (GBR)	Yelena Oleynikova (RUS)
2005 Madrid	Viktoriya Gurova (RUS)	Magdelín Martínez (ITA)	Carlota Castrejana (ESP)
2007 Birmingham	Olesya Bufalova (RUS)	Olesya Bufalova (RUS)	Teresa Nzola Meso Ba (FRA)
2009 Turin	Anastasiya Taranova (RUS)	Marija Šestak (SLO)	Dana Veldáková (SVK)
2011 Paris	Simona La Mantia (ITA)	Olesya Zabara (RUS)	Dana Veldáková (SVK)
2013 Gothenburg	Olha Saladuha (UKR)	Irina Gumenyuk (RUS)	Simona La Mantia (ITA)
2015 Prague	Yekaterina Koneva (RUS)	Gabriela Petrova (BUL)	Hanna Knyazyeva-Minenko (ISR)
2017 Belgrade	Kristin Gierisch (GER)	Patrícia Mamona (POR)	Paraskevi Papahristou (GRE)
2019 Glasgow	Ana Peleteiro (ESP)	Paraskevi Papahristou (GRE)	Olha Saladuha (UKR)
2021 Toruń	Patrícia Mamona (POR)	Ana Peleteiro (ESP)	Neele Eckhardt (GER)
2023 Istanbul	Tuğba Danışmaz (TUR)	Dariya Derkach (ITA)	Patrícia Mamona (POR)
2025 Apeldoorn	Ana Peleteiro-Compaoré (ESP)	Diana Ana Maria Ion (ROM)	Senni Salminen (FIN)

== Pole vault ==
Games	Gold	Silver	Bronze
1996 Stockholm	Vala Flosadóttir (ISL)	Christine Adams (GER)	Gabriela Mihalcea (ROU)
1998 Valencia	Anzhela Balakhonova (UKR)	Daniela Bártová (CZE)	Vala Flosadóttir (ISL)
2000 Ghent	Pavla Hamáčková (CZE)	Christine Adams (GER); Yelena Belyakova (RUS)	—
2002 Vienna	Svetlana Feofanova (RUS)	Yvonne Buschbaum (GER)	Monika Pyrek (POL)
2005 Madrid	Yelena Isinbayeva (RUS)	Anna Rogowska (POL)	Monika Pyrek (POL)
2007 Birmingham	Svetlana Feofanova (RUS)	Yuliya Golubchikova (RUS)	Anna Rogowska (POL)
2009 Turin	Yuliya Golubchikova (RUS)	Silke Spiegelburg (GER)	Anna Battke (GER)
2011 Paris	Anna Rogowska (POL)	Silke Spiegelburg (GER)	Kristina Gadschiew (GER)
2013 Gothenburg	Holly Bleasdale (GBR)	Anna Rogowska (POL)	Anzhelika Sidorova (RUS)
2015 Prague	Anzhelika Sidorova (RUS)	Ekaterini Stefanidi (GRE)	Angelica Bengtsson (SWE)
2017 Belgrade	Ekaterini Stefanidi (GRE)	Lisa Ryzih (GER)	Angelica Bengtsson (SWE); Maryna Kylypko (UKR)
2019 Glasgow	Anzhelika Sidorova (ANA)	Holly Bradshaw (GBR)	Ekaterini Stefanidi (GRE)
2021 Torun	Angelica Moser (SUI)	Tina Šutej (SLO)	Iryna Zhuk (BLR); Holly Bradshaw (GBR)
2023 Istanbul	Wilma Murto (FIN)	Tina Šutej (SLO)	Amálie Švábíková (CZE)
2025 Apeldoorn	Angelica Moser (SUI)	Tina Šutej (SLO)	Marie-Julie Bonnin (FRA)

== Shot put ==
Games	Gold	Silver	Bronze
1966 Dortmund	Margitta Gummel (GDR)	Tamara Press (URS)	Nadezhda Chizhova (URS)
1967 Prague	Nadezhda Chizhova (URS)	Ivanka Khristova (BUL)	Maria Chorbova (BUL)
1968 Madrid	Nadezhda Chizhova (URS)	Margitta Gummel (GDR)	Marita Lange (GDR)
1969 Belgrade	Marita Lange (GDR)	Ivanka Khristova (BUL)	Ingeburg Friedrich (GDR)
1970 Vienna	Nadezhda Chizhova (URS)	Hannelore Friedel (GDR)	Marita Lange (GDR)
1971 Sofia	Nadezhda Chizhova (URS)	Margitta Gummel (GDR)	Antonina Ivanova (URS)
1972 Grenoble	Nadezhda Chizhova (URS)	Antonina Ivanova (URS)	Marianne Adam (GDR)
1973 Rotterdam	Helena Fibingerová (TCH)	Ludwika Chewińska (POL)	Antonina Ivanova (URS)
1974 Gothenburg	Helena Fibingerová (TCH)	Nadezhda Chizhova (URS)	Marianne Adam (GDR)
1975 Katowice	Marianne Adam (GDR)	Helena Fibingerová (TCH)	Ivanka Khristova (BUL)
1976 Munich	Ivanka Khristova (BUL)	Svetlana Krachevskaya (URS)	Ilona Schoknecht (GDR)
1977 San Sebastián	Helena Fibingerová (TCH)	Ilona Slupianek (GDR)	Eva Wilms (FRG)
1978 Milan	Helena Fibingerová (TCH)	Margitta Droese (GDR)	Eva Wilms (FRG)
1979 Vienna	Ilona Slupianek (GDR)	Marianne Adam (GDR)	Judy Oakes (GBR)
1980 Sindelfingen	Helena Fibingerová (TCH)	Eva Wilms (FRG)	Beatrix Philipp (FRG)
1981 Grenoble	Ilona Slupianek (GDR)	Helena Fibingerová (TCH)	Helma Knorscheidt (GDR)
1982 Milan	Verzhinia Vesselinova (BUL)	Helena Fibingerová (TCH)	Natalya Lisovskaya (URS)
1983 Budapest	Helena Fibingerová (TCH)	Helma Knorscheidt (GDR)	Zdenka Šilhavá (TCH)
1984 Gothenburg	Helena Fibingerová (TCH)	Claudia Losch (FRG)	Heidi Krieger (GDR)
1985 Piraeus	Helena Fibingerová (TCH)	Claudia Losch (FRG)	Heike Hartwig (GDR)
1986 Madrid	Claudia Losch (FRG)	Heidi Krieger (GDR)	Mihaela Loghin (ROU)
1987 Liévin	Natalya Akhrimenko (URS)	Heidi Krieger (GDR)	Heike Hartwig (GDR)
1988 Budapest	Claudia Losch (FRG)	Larisa Peleshenko (URS)	Kathrin Neimke (GDR)
1989 The Hague	Stephanie Storp (FRG)	Heike Hartwig (GDR)	Iris Plotzitzka (FRG)
1990 Glasgow	Claudia Losch (FRG)	Natalya Lisovskaya (URS)	Grit Hammer (GDR)
1992 Genoa	Natalya Lisovskaya (EUN)	Svetla Mitkova (BUL)	Astrid Kumbernuss (GER)
1994 Paris	Astrid Kumbernuss (GER)	Larisa Peleshenko (RUS)	Svetla Mitkova (BUL)
1996 Stockholm	Astrid Kumbernuss (GER)	Irina Khudoroshkina (RUS)	Valentina Fedyushina (UKR)
1998 Valencia	Irina Korzhanenko (RUS)	Vita Pavlysh (UKR)	Corrie de Bruin (NED)
2000 Ghent	Larisa Peleshenko (RUS)	Nadine Kleinert-Schmitt (GER)	Astrid Kumbernuss (GER)
2002 Vienna	Vita Pavlysh (UKR)	Assunta Legnante (ITA)	Lieja Koeman (NED)
2005 Madrid	Nadzeya Astapchuk (BLR)	Krystyna Zabawska (POL)	Olga Ryabinkina (RUS)
2007 Birmingham	Assunta Legnante (ITA)	Irina Khudoroshkina (RUS)	Olga Ryabinkina (RUS)
2009 Turin	Petra Lammert (GER)	Denise Hinrichs (GER)	Anca Heltne (ROU)
2011 Paris	Anna Avdeyeva (RUS)	Christina Schwanitz (GER)	Josephine Terlecki (GER)
2013 Gothenburg	Christina Schwanitz (GER)	Yevgeniya Kolodko (RUS)	Alena Kopets (BLR)
2015 Prague	Anita Márton (HUN)	Yuliya Leantsiuk (BLR)	Radoslava Mavrodieva (BUL)
2017 Belgrade	Anita Márton (HUN)	Radoslava Mavrodieva (BUL)	Yuliya Leantsiuk (BLR)
2019 Glasgow	Radoslava Mavrodieva (BUL)	Christina Schwanitz (GER)	Anita Márton (HUN)
2021 Toruń	Auriol Dongmo (PRT)	Fanny Roos (SWE)	Christina Schwanitz (GER)
2023 Istanbul	Auriol Dongmo (PRT)	Sara Gambetta (GER)	Fanny Roos (SWE)
2025 Apeldoorn	Jessica Schilder (NED)	Yemisi Ogunleye (GER)	Auriol Dongmo (PRT)

== Pentathlon ==
Games	Gold	Silver	Bronze
1992 Genoa	Liliana Năstase (ROU)	Petra Văideanu (ROU)	Urszula Włodarczyk (POL)
1994 Paris	Larisa Turchinskaya (RUS)	Rita Ináncsi (HUN)	Urszula Włodarczyk (POL)
1996 Stockholm	Yelena Lebedenko (RUS)	Urszula Włodarczyk (POL)	Irina Vostrikova (RUS)
1998 Valencia	Urszula Włodarczyk (POL)	Irina Belova (RUS)	Karin Specht (GER)
2000 Ghent	Karin Ertl (GER)	Irina Vostrikova (RUS)	Urszula Włodarczyk (POL)
2002 Vienna	Yelena Prokhorova (RUS)	Naide Gomes (POR)	Carolina Klüft (SWE)
2005 Madrid	Carolina Klüft (SWE)	Kelly Sotherton (GBR)	Nataliya Dobrynska (UKR)
2007 Birmingham	Carolina Klüft (SWE)	Kelly Sotherton (GBR)	Karin Ruckstuhl (NED)
2009 Turin	Anna Bogdanova (RUS)	Jolanda Keizer (NED)	Antoinette Nana Djimou (FRA)
2011 Paris	Antoinette Nana Djimou (FRA)	Austra Skujytė (LTU)	Remona Fransen (NED)
2013 Gothenburg	Antoinette Nana Djimou (FRA)	Yana Maksimava (BLR)	Hanna Melnychenko (UKR)
2015 Prague	Katarina Johnson-Thompson (GBR)	Nafissatou Thiam (BEL)	Eliška Klučinová (CZE)
2017 Belgrade	Nafissatou Thiam (BEL)	Ivona Dadic (AUT)	Györgyi Zsivoczky-Farkas (HUN)
2019 Glasgow	Katarina Johnson-Thompson (GBR)	Niamh Emerson (GBR)	Solene Ndama (FRA)
2021 Toruń	Nafissatou Thiam (BEL)	Noor Vidts (BEL)	Xénia Krizsán (HUN)
2023 Istanbul	Nafissatou Thiam (BEL)	Adrianna Sułek (POL)	Noor Vidts (BEL)
2025 Apeldoorn	Saga Vanninen (FIN)	Sofie Dokter (NED)	Kate O'Connor (IRL)

== Defunct events ==
=== 200 metres ===
Games	Gold	Silver	Bronze
1982 Milan	Gesine Walther (GDR)	Yelena Kelchevskaya (URS)	Heidi-Elke Gaugel (FRG)
1983 Budapest	Marita Koch (GDR)	Joan Baptiste (GBR)	Christina Sussiek (FRG)
1984 Gothenburg	Jarmila Kratochvílová (TCH)	Marie-Christine Cazier (FRA)	Olga Antonova (URS)
1985 Piraeus	Marita Koch (GDR)	Kirsten Emmelmann (GDR)	Els Vader (NED)
1986 Madrid	Marita Koch (GDR)	Ewa Kasprzyk (POL)	Kirsten Emmelmann (GDR)
1987 Liévin	Kirsten Emmelmann (GDR)	Blanca Lacambra (ESP)	Marie-Christine Cazier (FRA)
1988 Budapest	Ewa Kasprzyk (POL)	Tatyana Papilina (URS)	Silke Knoll (FRG)
1989 The Hague	Marie-José Pérec (FRA)	Regula Aebi (SUI)	Sabine Tröger (AUT)
1990 Glasgow	Ulrike Sarvari (FRG)	Natalya Kovtun (URS)	Galina Malchugina (URS)
1992 Genoa	Oksana Stepicheva (EUN)	Iolanda Oanta (ROU)	Sabine Tröger (AUT)
1994 Paris	Galina Malchugina (RUS)	Silke Knoll (GER)	Jacqueline Poelman (NED)
1996 Stockholm	Sandra Myers (ESP)	Erika Suchovská (CZE)	Zlatka Georgieva (BUL)
1998 Valencia	Svetlana Goncharenko (RUS)	Melanie Paschke (GER)	Ekaterini Koffa (GRE)
2000 Ghent	Muriel Hurtis (FRA)	Alenka Bikar (SLO)	Yekaterina Leshchova (RUS)
2002 Vienna	Muriel Hurtis (FRA)	Karin Mayr (AUT)	Gabi Rockmeier (GER)
2005 Madrid	Ivet Lalova (BUL)	Karin Mayr-Krifka (AUT)	Jacqueline Poelman (NED)

=== 4 × 1 lap relay ===
Games	Gold	Silver	Bronze
1966 Dortmund	West Germany; Renate Meyer; Erika Rost; Hannelore Trabert; Kirsten Roggenkamp	Yugoslavia; Ljiljana Petnjarić; Marijana Lubej; Jelisaveta Đanić; Olga Šikovec	Czechoslovakia; Libuše Macounová; Alena Hiltscherová; Eva Kucmanová; Eva Lehocká
1967 Prague	Soviet Union; Valentyna Bolshova; Galina Bukharina; Tatyana Talysheva; Vera Popkova	Czechoslovakia; Eva Putnová; Vlasta Seifertová; Eva Kucmanová; Eva Lehocká	East Germany; Regina Höfer; Petra Zöllner; Renate Meißner; Brigitte Geyer
1968 Madrid	West Germany; Renate Meyer; Hannelore Trabert; Christa Elsler; Erika Rost	—	—
1969 Belgrade	France; Odette Ducas; Sylviane Telliez; Colette Besson; Christiane Martinetto	Soviet Union; Galina Bukharina; Vera Popkova; Lyudmila Golomazova; Lyudmila Samotyosova	Yugoslavia; Darja Marolt; Verica Ambrozi; Ljiljana Petnjarić; Marijana Lubej
1970 Vienna	Soviet Union; Nadezhda Besfamilnaya; Vera Popkova; Galina Bukharina; Lyudmila Samotyosova	West Germany; Elfgard Schittenhelm; Annelie Wilden; Marianne Bolling; Annegret Kroniger	Austria; Maria Sykora; Brigitte Ortner; Christa Kepplinger; Hanni Burger

=== 4 × 2 laps relay ===
Games	Gold	Silver	Bronze
1971 Sofia	Soviet Union; Lyubov Finogenova; Galina Kamardina; Vera Popkova; Lyudmila Aksyonova	West Germany; Gisela Ahlemeyer; Gisela Ellenberger; Annette Ruckes; Christa Czekay	Bulgaria; Svetla Slateva; Stefka Yordanova; Dshena Bineva; Tonka Petrova
1972 Grenoble	West Germany; Rita Wilden; Erika Weinstein; Christel Frese; Inge Bödding	Soviet Union; Natalya Chistyakova; Lyudmila Aksyonova; Lyubov Savyalova; Nadezhda Kolesnikova	France; Madeleine Thomas; Bernadette Martin; Nicole Duclos; Colette Besson
1973 Rotterdam	West Germany; Dagmar Jost; Erika Weinstein; Annelie Wilden; Gisela Ellenberger	France; Chantal Jouvhomme; Chantal Leclerc; Nicole Duclos; Colette Besson	Poland; Danuta Manowiecka; Marta Skrzypińska; Krystyna Kacperczyk; Danuta Piecyk
1974 Gothenburg	Sweden; Lena Fritzson; Ann-Margret Utterberg; Ann-Charlotte Hesse; Ann Larsson	Bulgaria; Lilyana Tomova; Sonya Zachariyeva; Yordanka Filipova; Tonka Petrova	—
1975 Katowice	Soviet Union; Inta Kļimoviča; Ingrida Barkane; Lyudmila Aksyonova; Nadezhda Ilyina	West Germany; Elke Barth; Brigitte Koczelnik; Silvia Hollmann; Rita Wilden	Poland; Zofia Zwolińska; Genowefa Nowaczyk; Krystyna Kacperczyk; Danuta Piecyk

=== Medley relay ===
Games	Gold	Silver	Bronze
1967 Prague	Soviet Union; Valentyna Bolshova; Vera Popkova; Tatyana Arnautova; Nadeshda Syeropegina	Yugoslavia; Marijana Lubej; Ika Maričić; Ljiljana Petnjarić; Gizela Farkaš	—
1968 Madrid	Soviet Union; Liliya Tkachenko; Vera Popkova; Nadeshda Syeropegina; Anna Zimina	Czechoslovakia; Eva Putnová; Vlasta Seifertová; Libuše Macounová; Emilie Ovadková	—
1969 Belgrade	Soviet Union; Vera Popkova; Lyudmila Samotyosova; Raisa Nikanorova; Anna Zimina	Poland; Irena Szewińska; Zdzisława Robaszewska; Elżbieta Skowrońska; Zofia Kołakowska	Yugoslavia; Verica Ambrozi; Ika Maričić; Mirjana Kovačev; Ninoslava Tikvicki
1970 Vienna	France; Sylviane Telliez; Mireille Testanière; Colette Besson; Nicole Duclos	West Germany; Elfgard Schittenhelm; Heidi Gerhard; Christa Merten; Jutta Haase	Soviet Union; Lyudmila Golomazova; Olga Klein; Nadezhda Kolesnikova; Svetlana Moshchenok

=== 3000 metres race walk ===
Games	Gold	Silver	Bronze
1987 Liévin	Natalya Dmitroshenko (URS)	Giuliana Salce (ITA)	Monica Gunnarsson (SWE)
1988 Budapest	María Reyes Sobrino (ESP)	Dana Vavracová (TCH)	Mari Cruz Díaz (ESP)
1989 The Hague	Beate Anders (GDR)	Ileana Salvador (ITA)	María Reyes Sobrino (ESP)
1990 Glasgow	Beate Anders (GDR)	Ileana Salvador (ITA)	Annarita Sidoti (ITA)
1992 Genoa	Alina Ivanova (EUN)	Annarita Sidoti (ITA)	Beate Anders (GER)
1994 Paris	Annarita Sidoti (ITA)	Beate Gummelt (GER)	Yelena Arshintseva (RUS)

== See also ==
- List of European Athletics Championships medalists (men)
- List of European Athletics Championships medalists (women)
- List of European records in athletics
