= 1966 European Indoor Games – Women's 4 × 160 metres relay =

The women's 4 × 160 metres relay event at the 1966 European Indoor Games was held on 27 March in Dortmund. Each athlete ran one lap of the 160 metres track.

== Results ==
Rank	Nation	Competitors	Time	Notes
1st place, gold medalist(s)	West Germany	Renate Meyer; Erika Rost; Hannelore Trabert; Kirsten Roggenkamp	1:18.4	
2nd place, silver medalist(s)	Yugoslavia	Ljiljana Petnjarić; Marijana Lubej; Jelisaveta Đanić; Olga Šikovec	1:21.7	
3rd place, bronze medalist(s)	Czechoslovakia	Libuše Macounová; Alena Hiltscherová; Eva Kucmanová; Eva Lehocká	1:22.3	
