= 1966 European Indoor Games – Women's 60 metres hurdles =

The men's 60 metres hurdles event at the 1966 European Indoor Games was held on 27 March in Dortmund.

== Medalists ==
Gold	Silver	Bronze
Irina Press; Soviet Union	Gundula Diel; East Germany	Inge Schell; West Germany

== Results ==
=== Heats ===
First 2 from each heat (Q) and the next 6 fastest (q) qualified for the semifinals.

Rank	Heat	Name	Nationality	Time	Notes
1	1	Inge Schell	West Germany	8.5	Q
2	1	Marlène Canguio	France	8.5	Q
3	1	Ulla-Britt Wieslander	Sweden	8.6	q
4	1	Marijana Lubej	Yugoslavia	8.8	q
1	2	Irina Press	Soviet Union	8.3	Q
2	2	Renate Balck	West Germany	8.6	Q
3	2	Nina Hansen	Denmark	8.7	q
1	3	Gundula Diel	East Germany	8.4	Q
2	3	Françoise Masse	France	8.5	Q
3	3	Alena Hiltscherová	Czechoslovakia	8.7	q
4	3	Meta Antenen	Switzerland	8.6	q

=== Semifinals ===
First 3 from each heat (Q) qualified directly for the final.

Rank	Heat	Name	Nationality	Time	Notes
1	1	Gundula Diel	East Germany	8.4	Q
2	1	Alena Hiltscherová	Czechoslovakia	8.4	Q
3	1	Françoise Masse	France	8.4	Q
4	1	Renate Balck	West Germany	8.5	
5	1	Ulla-Britt Wieslander	Sweden	8.6	
6	1	Nina Hansen	Denmark	8.7	
1	2	Irina Press	Soviet Union	8.3	Q
2	2	Inge Schell	West Germany	8.4	Q
3	2	Marlène Canguio	France	8.4	Q
4	2	Meta Antenen	Switzerland	8.7	
5	2	Marijana Lubej	Yugoslavia	8.8	

=== Final ===
Rank	Name	Nationality	Time	Notes
1st place, gold medalist(s)	Irina Press	Soviet Union	8.1	
2nd place, silver medalist(s)	Gundula Diel	East Germany	8.4	
3rd place, bronze medalist(s)	Inge Schell	West Germany	8.4	
4	Marlène Canguio	France	8.5	
5	Françoise Masse	France	8.5	
6	Alena Hiltscherová	Czechoslovakia	8.6	
