= 1968 European Indoor Games – Women's 50 metres hurdles =

The women's 50 metres hurdles event at the 1968 European Indoor Games was held on 9 March in Madrid.

== Medalists ==
Gold	Silver	Bronze
Karin Balzer; East Germany	Bärbel Podeswa; East Germany	Liudmila Ievleva; Soviet Union

== Results ==
=== Heats ===
First 4 from each heat (Q) qualified directly for the semifinals.

Rank	Heat	Name	Nationality	Time	Notes
1	3	Galina Zarubina	Soviet Union	7.07	Q
2	3	Karin Balzer	East Germany	7.10	Q
3	1	Liudmila Ievleva	Soviet Union	7.12	Q
4	2	Inge Schell	West Germany	7.16	Q
5	1	Ulla-Britt Wieslander	Sweden	7.18	Q
5	3	Meta Antenen	Switzerland	7.18	Q
7	2	Valeria Ștefănescu	Romania	7.19	Q
8	2	Bärbel Podeswa	East Germany	7.20	Q
9	1	Vlasta Seifertová	Czechoslovakia	7.23	Q
10	2	Danièle Guéneau	France	7.32	Q
11	2	Marijana Lubej	Yugoslavia	7.36	
12	1	Françoise Masse	France	7.37	Q
13	1	Ulla Farthmann	West Germany	7.37	
14	3	Đurđa Fočić	Yugoslavia	7.60	Q

=== Semifinals ===
First 3 from each heat (Q) qualified directly for the final.

Rank	Heat	Name	Nationality	Time	Notes
1	2	Karin Balzer	East Germany	6.90	Q
2	2	Liudmila Ievleva	Soviet Union	7.12	Q
3	1	Bärbel Podeswa	East Germany	7.14	Q
4	1	Inge Schell	West Germany	7.14	Q
5	1	Galina Zarubina	Soviet Union	7.16	Q
6	1	Meta Antenen	Switzerland	7.16	
7	1	Vlasta Seifertová	Czechoslovakia	7.24	
8	2	Valeria Ștefănescu	Romania	7.28	Q
9	2	Ulla-Britt Wieslander	Sweden	7.31	
10	1	Danièle Guéneau	France	7.57	
	2	Françoise Masse	France	DNS	
	2	Đurđa Fočić	Yugoslavia	DNS	

=== Final ===
Rank	Lane	Name	Nationality	Time	Notes
1st place, gold medalist(s)	6	Karin Balzer	East Germany	7.03	
2nd place, silver medalist(s)	2	Bärbel Podeswa	East Germany	7.07	
3rd place, bronze medalist(s)	1	Liudmila Ievleva	Soviet Union	7.09	
4	3	Inge Schell	West Germany	7.13	
5	4	Valeria Ștefănescu	Romania	7.19	
6	5	Galina Zarubina	Soviet Union	7.22	
