= 1967 European Indoor Games – Women's 4 × 150 metres relay =

The women's 4 × 150 metres relay event at the 1967 European Indoor Games was held on 11 and 12 March in Prague. Each athlete ran one lap of the 150 metres track.

== Results ==
=== Heats ===
First 2 teams in each heat (Q) qualified directly for the final.

Rank	Heat	Nation	Competitors	Time	Notes
1	1	West Germany	Hannelore Trabert; Jutta Stöck; Erika Rost; Heide Rosendahl	1:14.0	Q
2	1	Soviet Union	Galina Bukharina; Valentyna Bolshova; Tatyana Talysheva; Vera Popkova	1:14.5	Q
3	1	Hungary	Margit Nemesházi; Györgyi Balogh; Erzsébet Bartos; Annamária Tóth	1:15.7	
1	2	East Germany	Regina Höfer; Petra Zörner; Renate Meißner; Brigitte Geyer	1:13.4	Q
2	2	Czechoslovakia	Eva Putnová; Vlasta Seifertová; Eva Kucmanová; Eva Lehocká	1:14.7	Q
3	2	Yugoslavia	Ika Maričić; Jelisaveta Đanić; Marijana Lubej; Ljiljana Petnjarić	1:15.1	

=== Final ===
Rank	Nation	Competitors	Time	Notes
1st place, gold medalist(s)	Soviet Union	Valentyna Bolshova; Galina Bukharina; Tatyana Talysheva; Vera Popkova	1:12.4	
2nd place, silver medalist(s)	Czechoslovakia	Eva Putnová; Vlasta Seifertová; Eva Kucmanová; Eva Lehocká	1:14.0	
3rd place, bronze medalist(s)	East Germany	Regina Höfer; Petra Zöllner; Renate Meißner; Brigitte Geyer	1:14.1	
	West Germany	Hannelore Trabert; Erika Rost; Jutta Stöck; Heide Rosendahl	DQ	
