= 1966 European Athletics Championships – Women's 80 metres hurdles =

Women's 80 metres hurdles at the European Athletics Championships

The women's 80 metres hurdles at the 1966 European Athletics Championships was held in Budapest, Hungary, at Népstadion on 2, 3, and 4 September 1966.

== Medalists ==
Gold	Karin Balzer; East Germany
Silver	Karin Frisch; West Germany
Bronze	Elżbieta Bednarek; Poland

== Results ==
=== Final ===
4 September Wind: 0.2 m/s

Rank	Name	Nationality	Time	Notes
1st place, gold medalist(s)	Karin Balzer	East Germany	10.7	
2nd place, silver medalist(s)	Karin Frisch	West Germany	10.7	
3rd place, bronze medalist(s)	Elżbieta Bednarek	Poland	10.7	
4	Renate Balck	West Germany	10.7	
5	Inge Schell	West Germany	10.8	
6	Niliya Kulkova	Soviet Union	10.9	
7	Danuta Straszyńska	Poland	10.9	
8	Gundula Diel	East Germany	11.0	

=== Semi-finals ===
3 September

==== Semi-final 1 ====
Wind: 0 m/s

Rank	Name	Nationality	Time	Notes
1	Renate Balck	West Germany	10.8	Q
2	Elżbieta Bednarek	Poland	10.9	Q
3	Inge Schell	West Germany	10.9	Q
4	Gundula Diel	East Germany	11.1	Q
5	Vlasta Přikrylová	Czechoslovakia	11.1	
6	Rimma Larionova	Soviet Union	11.2	
7	Snezhana Zhalova	Bulgaria	11.2	
	Meta Antenen	Switzerland	DNS	

==== Semi-final 2 ====
Wind: 0 m/s

Rank	Name	Nationality	Time	Notes
1	Danuta Straszyńska	Poland	10.8	Q
2	Karin Frisch	West Germany	10.8	Q
3	Karin Balzer	East Germany	10.9	Q
4	Niliya Kulkova	Soviet Union	10.9	Q
5	Danièle Guéneau	France	11.1	
6	Rita van Slooten	Netherlands	11.1	
7	Vera Korsakova	Soviet Union	11.1	
8	Regina Höfer	East Germany	11.2	

=== Heats ===
2 September

==== Heat 1 ====
Wind: 0 m/s

Rank	Name	Nationality	Time	Notes
1	Karin Balzer	East Germany	10.9	Q
2	Karin Frisch	West Germany	10.9	Q
3	Vlasta Přikrylová	Czechoslovakia	11.1	Q
4	Vera Korsakova	Soviet Union	11.2	Q
5	Magaly Vettorazzo	Italy	11.2	
6	Pat Pryce	Great Britain	11.2	
7	Françoise Masse	France	11.5	
8	Melek Aydınoğlu	Turkey	12.4	

==== Heat 2 ====
Wind: 0 m/s

Rank	Name	Nationality	Time	Notes
1	Danuta Straszyńska	Poland	10.9	Q
2	Danièle Guéneau	France	11.1	Q
3	Rimma Larionova	Soviet Union	11.1	Q
4	Regina Höfer	East Germany	11.2	Q
5	Maxine Botley	Great Britain	11.4	
6	Mária Pethö	Hungary	11.6	
7	Charoula Sasagianni	Greece	12.1	

==== Heat 3 ====
Wind: 0 m/s

Rank	Name	Nationality	Time	Notes
1	Elżbieta Bednarek	Poland	10.7	Q
2	Inge Schell	West Germany	10.8	Q
3	Gundula Diel	East Germany	11.0	Q
4	Rita van Slooten	Netherlands	11.1	Q
5	Sirkka Norrlund	Finland	11.1	
6	Alena Hiltscherova	Czechoslovakia	11.2	
7	Marjana Lubej	Yugoslavia	11.6	

==== Heat 4 ====
Wind: 0.1 m/s

Rank	Name	Nationality	Time	Notes
1	Renate Balck	West Germany	10.9	Q
2	Niliya Kulkova	Soviet Union	10.9	Q
3	Meta Antenen	Switzerland	11.2	Q
4	Snezhana Zhalova	Bulgaria	11.3	Q

== Participation ==
According to an unofficial count, 26 athletes from 16 countries participated in the event.

- Bulgaria (1)
- Czechoslovakia (2)
- East Germany (3)
- Finland (1)
- France (2)
- Greece (1)
- Hungary (1)
- Italy (1)
- Netherlands (1)
- Poland (2)
- Soviet Union (3)
- Switzerland (1)
- Turkey (1)
- Great Britain (2)
- West Germany (3)
- Yugoslavia (1)
