= 1967 European Indoor Games – Women's 50 metres hurdles =

The men's 50 metres hurdles event at the 1967 European Indoor Games was held on 11 and 12 March in Prague.

== Medalists ==
Gold	Silver	Bronze
Karin Balzer; East Germany	Vlasta Seifertová; Czechoslovakia	Inge Schell; West Germany

== Results ==
=== Heats ===
First 3 from each heat (Q) qualified directly for the final.

Rank	Heat	Name	Nationality	Time	Notes
1	1	Karin Balzer	East Germany	7.0	Q, WB
2	1	Vlasta Seifertová	Czechoslovakia	7.1	Q
3	1	Meta Antenen	Switzerland	7.2	Q
4	1	Valentyna Bolshova	Soviet Union	7.2	
1	2	Inge Schell	West Germany	7.1	Q
2	2	Liudmila Ievleva	Soviet Union	7.1	Q
3	2	Regina Höfer	East Germany	7.2	Q
4	2	Anna Zábršová	Czechoslovakia	7.3	
5	2	Marijana Lubej	Yugoslavia	7.3	

=== Final ===
Rank	Name	Nationality	Time	Notes
1st place, gold medalist(s)	Karin Balzer	East Germany	6.9	WB
2nd place, silver medalist(s)	Vlasta Seifertová	Czechoslovakia	7.0	
3rd place, bronze medalist(s)	Inge Schell	West Germany	7.1	
4	Liudmila Ievleva	Soviet Union	7.1	
5	Regina Höfer	East Germany	7.1	
6	Meta Antenen	Switzerland	7.2	
