= 1967 European Indoor Games – Women's long jump =

The women's long jump event at the 1967 European Indoor Games was held on 11 and 12 March in Prague.

== Medalists ==
Gold	Silver	Bronze
Berit Berthelsen; Norway	Heide Rosendahl; West Germany	Viorica Viscopoleanu; Romania

== Results ==
=== Qualification ===
Rank	Name	Nationality	#1	#2	#3	Result	Notes
1	Tatyana Talysheva	Soviet Union	x	6.33	x	6.33	q
2	Berit Berthelsen	Norway	6.09	6.29	x	6.29	q
3	Viorica Viscopoleanu	Romania	6.27	x	–	6.27	q
4	Corrie Bakker	Netherlands	6.01	x	6.16	6.16	q
5	Meta Antenen	Switzerland	5.77	5.80	6.15	6.15	q
6	Heide Rosendahl	West Germany	6.06	6.13	6.04	6.13	q
7	Ulla Olsson	Sweden	x	4.47	5.95	5.95	
8	Eva Kucmanová	Czechoslovakia	5.77	5.60	5.89	5.89	
9	Libuša Kladeková	Czechoslovakia				5.78	
10	Ivanka Dimova	Bulgaria	5.73	x	5.51	5.73	
11	Đurđa Fočić	Yugoslavia	x	x	5.01	5.01	

=== Final ===
Rank	Name	Nationality	#1	#2	#3	#4	#5	#6	Result	Notes
1st place, gold medalist(s)	Berit Berthelsen	Norway	6.24	6.51	x	6.26	6.07	x	6.51	NR
2nd place, silver medalist(s)	Heide Rosendahl	West Germany	x	6.41	x	x	6.07	6.33	6.41	
3rd place, bronze medalist(s)	Viorica Viscopoleanu	Romania	x	6.25	x	x	6.40	x	6.40	
4	Tatyana Talysheva	Soviet Union	x	x	5.03	x	6.17	6.25	6.26	
5	Meta Antenen	Switzerland	6.11	6.01	6.06	x	6.11	6.05	6.11	
6	Corrie Bakker	Netherlands	6.06	x	x	5.55	x	x	6.06	
