= 1966 European Athletics Championships – Women's long jump =

Women's long jump at the European Athletics Championships

The women's long jump at the 1966 European Athletics Championships was held in Budapest, Hungary, at Népstadion on 2 and 3 September 1966.

== Medalists ==
Gold	Irena Kirszenstein; Poland
Silver	Diana Yorgova; Bulgaria
Bronze	Helga Hoffmann; West Germany

== Results ==
=== Final ===
3 September

Rank	Name	Nationality	Result	Notes
1st place, gold medalist(s)	Irena Kirszenstein	Poland	6.55	CR
2nd place, silver medalist(s)	Diana Yorgova	Bulgaria	6.45	
3rd place, bronze medalist(s)	Helga Hoffmann	West Germany	6.38	
4	Corrie Bakker	Netherlands	6.34	NR
5	Viorica Viscopoleanu	Romania	6.33	
6	Tatyana Talysheva	Soviet Union	6.33	
7	Sheila Parkin	Great Britain	6.30	
8	Meta Antenen	Switzerland	6.23	NR
9	Burghild Wieczorek	East Germany	6.22	
10	Renāte Lāce	Soviet Union	6.19	
11	Mary Rand	Great Britain	6.16	
12	Eva Kucmanová	Czechoslovakia	5.98	
	Berit Berthelsen	Norway	DNS	

=== Qualification ===
2 September

Rank	Name	Nationality	Result	Notes
1	Diana Yorgova	Bulgaria	6.30	Q
2	Viorica Viscopoleanu	Romania	6.26	Q
3	Burghild Wieczorek	East Germany	6.22	Q
4	Renāte Lāce	Soviet Union	6.21	Q
5	Eva Kucmanová	Czechoslovakia	6.19	Q
6	Tatyana Talysheva	Soviet Union	6.19	Q
7	Corrie Bakker	Netherlands	6.16	Q
8	Mary Rand	Great Britain	6.15	Q
9	Helga Hoffmann	West Germany	6.12	Q
10	Meta Antenen	Switzerland	6.12	Q
11	Irena Kirszenstein	Poland	6.12	Q
12	Berit Berthelsen	Norway	6.05	Q
13	Sheila Parkin	Great Britain	6.05	Q
14	Ursula Künzel	West Germany	6.04	
15	Ingrid Mickler	West Germany	5.94	
16	Etelka Kispal	Hungary	5.94	
17	Gerda Mittenzwei	East Germany	5.92	
18	Elena Vintila	Romania	5.84	
19	Marie-Magdalena Le Dévéhat	France	5.77	
20	Oddrun Hokland	Norway	5.68	
21	Charoula Sasagianni	Greece	5.62	
22	Nina Hansen	Denmark	5.60	
23	Zhuljeta Muco	Albania	5.03	

== Participation ==
According to an unofficial count, 23 athletes from 16 countries participated in the event.

- Albania (1)
- Bulgaria (1)
- Czechoslovakia (1)
- Denmark (1)
- East Germany (2)
- France (1)
- Greece (1)
- Hungary (1)
- Netherlands (1)
- Norway (2)
- Poland (1)
- Romania (2)
- Soviet Union (2)
- Switzerland (1)
- Great Britain (2)
- West Germany (3)
