= Athletics at the 1968 Summer Olympics – Women's 80 metres hurdles =

Women's 80 metres hurdles at the Games of the XIX Olympiad
- Venue: Estadio Olímpico Universitario
- Date: October 17–18, 1968
- Competitors: 33 from 23 nations
- Winning time: 10.3 OR

Medalists
1st place, gold medalist(s)		Maureen Caird	Australia
2nd place, silver medalist(s)		Pam Kilborn	Australia
3rd place, bronze medalist(s)		Chi Cheng	Taiwan

The Women's 80 metres hurdles competition at the 1968 Summer Olympics in Mexico City, Mexico was held at the University Olympic Stadium on October 17–18.

== Competition format ==
The Women's 80m hurdles competition consisted of heats (Round 1), Semifinals and a Final. The three fastest competitors from each race in the heats qualified for the semifinals, along with the fastest overall competitor not already qualified. The top four athletes from each semifinals race advanced to the final.

== Records ==
Prior to this competition, the existing world and Olympic records were as follows:

World record	Vera Korsakova (URS)	10.2	Soviet Union	July 16, 1968
Olympic record	Irina Press (URS)	10.6	Rome, Italy	August 31, 1960

== Results ==
=== Round 1 ===
Qual. rule: first 3 of each heat (Q) plus the next fastest Time (hand) !! Time (automatic) (q) qualified.

==== Heat 1 ====
Wind: +2.4 m/s

Rank	Athlete	Nation	Time (hand)	Time (automatic)	Notes
1	Mamie Rallins	United States	10.6	10.69	Q
2	Vera Korsakova	Soviet Union	10.6	10.74	Q
3	Inge Schell	West Germany	10.7	10.77	Q
4	Carmen Smith	Jamaica	11.0	11.09	
5	Carla Panerai	Italy	11.0	11.10	
6	Enriqueta Basilio	Mexico	11.1	11.20	
7	Ulla-Britt Wieslander	Sweden	11.2	11.24	

==== Heat 2 ====
Wind: +0.2 m/s

Rank	Athlete	Nation	Time (hand)	Time (automatic)	Notes
1	Pam Kilborn	Australia	10.4	10.41	Q
2	Valeria Bufanu	Romania	10.9	10.92	Q
3	Mária Kiss	Hungary	10.9	10.93	Q
4	Marlene Elejarde	Cuba	10.9	10.99	
5	Marijana Lubej	Yugoslavia	11.0	11.02	
6	Snezhana Yurukova	Bulgaria	11.0	11.07	
7	Ann Wilson	Great Britain	11.1	11.19	

==== Heat 3 ====
Wind: +0.8 m/s

Rank	Athlete	Nation	Time (hand)	Time (automatic)	Notes
1	Patty Van Wolvelaere	United States	10.6	10.65	Q
2	Teresa Sukniewicz	Poland	10.7	10.72	Q
3	Tatyana Talysheva	Soviet Union	10.8	10.81	Q
4	Carlota Ulloa	Chile	11.1	11.13	
5	Jenny Meldrum	Canada	11.1	11.17	
—N/a	Pat Pryce	Great Britain	DNF	–	
—N/a	Karin Reichert	West Germany	DNS	–	

==== Heat 4 ====
Wind: +2.0 m/s

Rank	Athlete	Nation	Time (hand)	Time (automatic)	Notes
1	Maureen Caird	Australia	10.4	10.48	Q
2	Chi Cheng	Taiwan	10.5	10.53	Q
3	Danuta Straszyńska	Poland	10.7	10.72	Q
4	Inge Aigner	Austria	10.8	10.83	q
5	Meta Antenen	Switzerland	10.9	10.95	
6	Pat Jones	Great Britain	11.0	11.03	
7	Roswitha Emonts-Gast	Belgium	11.4	11.50	

==== Heat 5 ====
Wind: +1.5 m/s

Rank	Athlete	Nation	Time (hand)	Time (automatic)	Notes
1	Karin Balzer	East Germany	10.7	10.72	Q
2	Elżbieta Żebrowska	Poland	10.8	10.83	Q
3	Judy Dyer	United States	10.9	10.94	Q
4	Liudmila Ievleva	Soviet Union	10.9	10.97	
5	Yeh Chu-Mei	Taiwan	11.7	11.77	
6	Cecilia Sosa	El Salvador	12.8	12.90	
—N/a	Heide Rosendahl	West Germany	DNS	–	

=== Semifinals ===
Qual. rule: first 4 of each heat (Q) qualified.

==== Heat 1 ====
Wind: +2.0 m/s

Rank	Athlete	Nation	Time (hand)	Time (automatic)	Notes
1	Maureen Caird	Australia	10.5	10.59	Q
2	Patty Van Wolvelaere	United States	10.6	10.72	Q
3	Tatyana Talysheva	Soviet Union	10.7	10.80	Q
4	Karin Balzer	East Germany	10.8	10.83	Q
5	Vera Korsakova	Soviet Union	10.8	10.86	
6	Teresa Sukniewicz	Poland	10.9	11.00	
7	Valeria Bufanu	Romania	11.0	11.08	
8	Inge Aigner	Austria	11.1	11.12	

==== Heat 2 ====
Wind: 0.0 m/s

Rank	Athlete	Nation	Time (hand)	Time (automatic)	Notes
1	Pam Kilborn	Australia	10.4	10.44	Q
2	Chi Cheng	Taiwan	10.5	10.56	Q
3	Danuta Straszyńska	Poland	10.5	10.60	Q
4	Elżbieta Żebrowska	Poland	10.6	10.70	Q
5	Mamie Rallins	United States	10.6	10.70	
6	Judy Dyer	United States	10.8	10.84	
7	Inge Schell	West Germany	10.8	10.84	
8	Mária Kiss	Hungary	11.2	11.22	

=== Final ===
Wind: 0.0 m/s

Rank	Athlete	Nation	Time (hand)	Time (automatic)	Notes
1st place, gold medalist(s)	Maureen Caird	Australia	10.3	10.39	OR
2nd place, silver medalist(s)	Pam Kilborn	Australia	10.4	10.39	
3rd place, bronze medalist(s)	Chi Cheng	Taiwan	10.4	10.51	
4	Patty Van Wolvelaere	United States	10.5	10.60	
5	Karin Balzer	East Germany	10.6	10.61	
6	Danuta Straszyńska	Poland	10.6	10.66	
7	Elżbieta Żebrowska	Poland	10.6	10.66	
8	Tatyana Talysheva	Soviet Union	10.7	10.72	
