= 1968 European Indoor Games – Women's 50 metres =

The women's 50 metres event at the 1968 European Indoor Games was held on 10 March in Madrid.

== Medalists ==
Gold	Silver	Bronze
Sylviane Telliez; France	Erika Rost; West Germany	Hannelore Trabert; West Germany

== Results ==
=== Heats ===
First three from each heat (Q) qualified directly for the final.

Rank	Heat	Name	Nationality	Time	Notes
1	1	Sylviane Telliez	France	6.32	Q
2	1	Hannelore Trabert	West Germany	6.34	Q
3	1	Galina Mitrokhina	Soviet Union	6.44	Q
3	2	Erika Rost	West Germany	6.44	Q
5	2	Renate Heldt	East Germany	6.45	Q
6	1	Ingrid Tiedtke	East Germany	6.49	
7	2	Galina Bukharina	Soviet Union	6.51	Q
8	2	Ulla-Britt Wieslander	Sweden	6.52	
9	2	Berit Berthelsen	Norway	6.53	
10	1	Marijana Lubej	Yugoslavia	6.57	
11	1	Eva Putnová	Czechoslovakia	6.63	
12	2	María Luisa Orobia	Spain	6.69	

=== Final ===
Rank	Lane	Name	Nationality	Time	Notes
1st place, gold medalist(s)	4	Sylviane Telliez	France	6.24	WB
2nd place, silver medalist(s)	1	Erika Rost	West Germany	6.38	
3rd place, bronze medalist(s)	6	Hannelore Trabert	West Germany	6.41	
4	3	Galina Mitrokhina	Soviet Union	6.45	
5	5	Galina Bukharina	Soviet Union	6.45	
6	2	Renate Heldt	East Germany	6.48	
