= 1968 European Indoor Games – Women's long jump =

The women's long jump event at the 1968 European Indoor Games was held on 9 March in Madrid.

== Results ==
Rank	Name	Nationality	#1	#2	#3	#4	#5	#6	Result	Notes
1st place, gold medalist(s)	Berit Berthelsen	Norway	6.34	6.43	6.19	6.29	x	x	6.43	
2nd place, silver medalist(s)	Bärbel Löhnert	East Germany	6.22	6.21	6.02	6.11	6.12	6.23	6.23	
3rd place, bronze medalist(s)	Viorica Viscopoleanu	Romania	x	x	5.93	x	x	6.23	6.23	
4	Heide Rosendahl	West Germany	6.18	6.05	5.89	6.00	6.20	x	6.20	
5	Helēna Ringa	Soviet Union	6.08	x	5.96	6.07	x	6.14	6.14	
6	Meta Antenen	Switzerland	6.08	5.93	5.97	5.97	5.98	x	6.08	
7	Marijana Lubej	Yugoslavia							5.51	
