= 1969 European Indoor Games – Women's 50 metres hurdles =

The women's 50 metres hurdles event at the 1969 European Indoor Games was held on 8 March in Belgrade.

== Medalists ==
Gold	Silver	Bronze
Karin Balzer; East Germany	Meta Antenen; Switzerland	Christine Perera; Great Britain

== Results ==
=== Heats ===
First 2 from each heat (Q) and the next 1 fastest (q) qualified for the final.

Rank	Heat	Name	Nationality	Time	Notes
1	1	Heidemarie Rosendahl	West Germany	7.6	Q
2	1	Christiane Martinetto	France	7.6	Q
3	1	Galina Zarubina	Soviet Union	7.6	
4	1	Elena Mirza	Romania	7.8	
5	1	Inge Aigner	Austria	7.9	
1	2	Karin Balzer	East Germany	7.3	Q
2	2	Christine Perera	Great Britain	7.4	Q
3	2	Snezhana Yurukova	Bulgaria	7.4	
4	2	Elżbieta Żebrowska	Poland	7.4	
5	2	Emina Pilav	Yugoslavia	7.5	
6	2	Milena Piačková	Czechoslovakia	7.6	
1	3	Meta Antenen	Switzerland	7.4	Q
2	3	Galina Kuznetsova	Soviet Union	7.4	Q
3	3	Marijana Lubej	Yugoslavia	7.4	q
4	3	Dimitrina Koleva	Bulgaria	7.5	
5	3	Liese Prokop	Austria	8.1	

=== Final ===
Rank	Name	Nationality	Time	Notes
1st place, gold medalist(s)	Karin Balzer	East Germany	7.2	WB
2nd place, silver medalist(s)	Meta Antenen	Switzerland	7.3	
3rd place, bronze medalist(s)	Christine Perera	Great Britain	7.4	
4	Galina Kuznetsova	Soviet Union	7.4	
5	Christiane Martinetto	France	7.5	
6	Marijana Lubej	Yugoslavia	7.6	
7	Heidemarie Rosendahl	West Germany	7.6	
