= 1966 European Indoor Games – Women's long jump =

The women's long jump event at the 1966 European Indoor Games was held on 27 March in Dortmund.

== Medalists ==
Gold	Silver	Bronze
Tatyana Shchelkanova; Soviet Union	Mary Rand; Great Britain	Heide Rosendahl; West Germany

== Results ==
=== Qualification ===
Rank	Name	Nationality	#1	#2	#3	Result	Notes
1	Tatyana Shchelkanova	Soviet Union	6.60	–	–	6.60	q, WB
2	Mary Rand	Great Britain	6.32	6.16	6.23	6.32	q
3	Heide Rosendahl	West Germany	6.24	5.95	6.07	6.24	q
4	Oddrun Hokland	Norway	5.86	5.98	5.56	5.98	q
5	Meta Antenen	Switzerland	5.92	5.85	5.77	5.92	q
6	Viorica Viscopoleanu	Romania	x	5.87	5.87	5.87	q
7	Nina Hansen	Denmark	4.29	5.39	5.56	5.56	
8	Eva Kucmanová	Czechoslovakia	5.53	5.04	5.27	5.53	
9	Marlène Canguio	France	x	5.36	5.37	5.37	

=== Final ===
Rank	Name	Nationality	#1	#2	#3	#4	#5	#6	Result	Notes
1st place, gold medalist(s)	Tatyana Shchelkanova	Soviet Union	x	6.71	6.63	x	x	6.73	6.73	WB
2nd place, silver medalist(s)	Mary Rand	Great Britain	x	6.53	6.39	6.46	6.40	6.23	6.53	
3rd place, bronze medalist(s)	Heide Rosendahl	West Germany	6.29	6.49	6.14	x	6.10	x	6.49	
4	Viorica Viscopoleanu	Romania	x	6.01	x	5.82	x	5.82	6.01	
5	Oddrun Hokland	Norway	5.72	5.83	5.93	5.83	5.66	x	5.93	
6	Meta Antenen	Switzerland	5.66	5.83	5.73	5.69	5.71	5.77	5.83	
