= 1974 European Athletics Indoor Championships – Women's long jump =

The women's long jump event at the 1974 European Athletics Indoor Championships was held on 10 March in Gothenburg.

== Results ==
Rank	Name	Nationality	Result	Notes
1st place, gold medalist(s)	Meta Antenen	Switzerland	6.69	NR
2nd place, silver medalist(s)	Angela Schmalfeld	East Germany	6.56	
3rd place, bronze medalist(s)	Valeria Ștefănescu	Romania	6.39	
4	Jarmila Nygrýnová	Czechoslovakia	6.38	
5	Viorica Viscopoleanu	Romania	6.32	
6	Ruth Martin-Jones	Great Britain	6.30	
7	Nina Gavrilova	Soviet Union	6.28	
8	Margarita Treinytė	Soviet Union	6.28	
9	Kapitolina Lotova	Soviet Union	6.11	
10	Tuula Rautanen	Finland	6.10	
