= 1966 European Indoor Games =

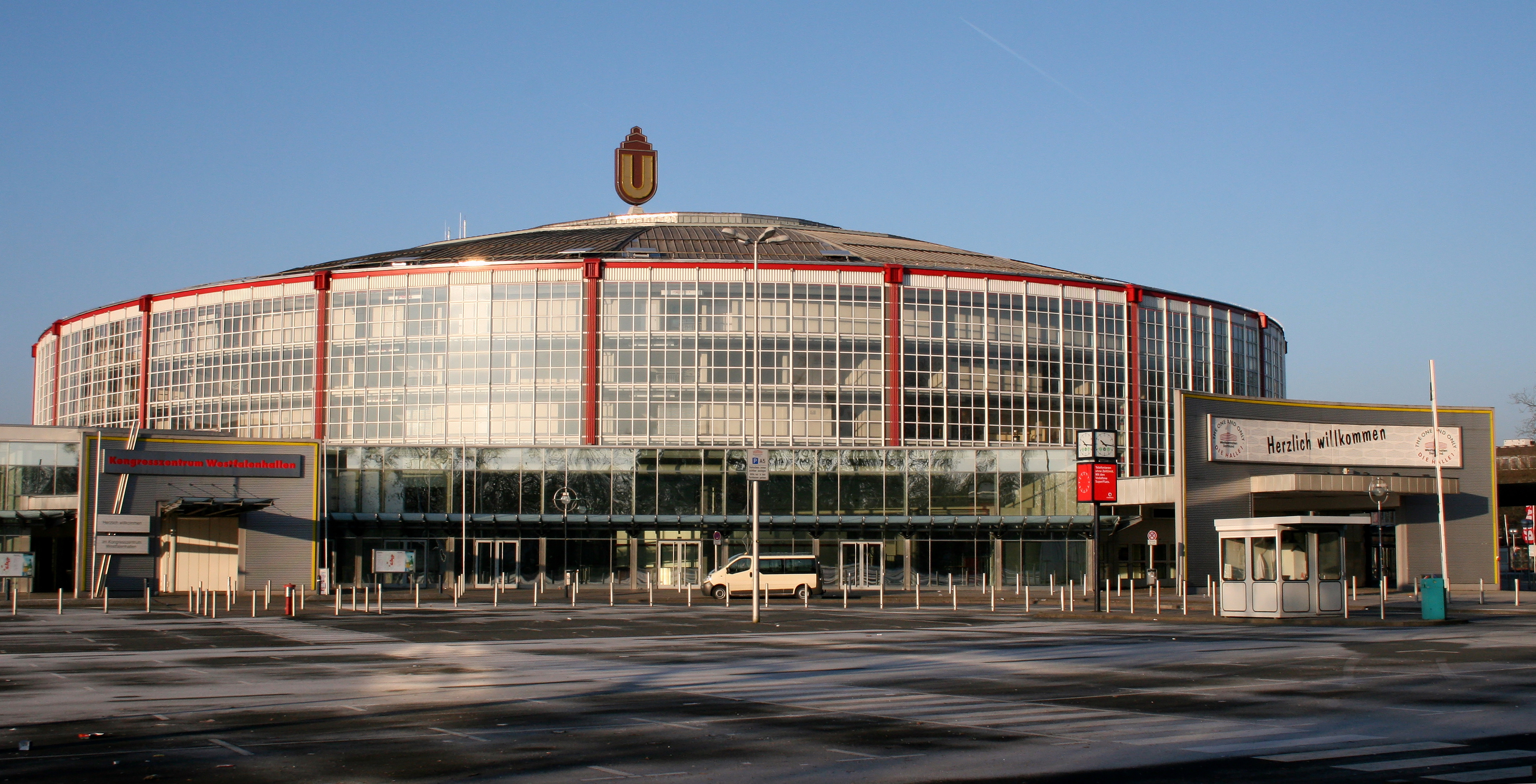
- Dates: 27 March 1966
- Host city: Dortmund; West Germany
- Venue: Westfalenhalle
- Events: 21
- Participation: 186 athletes from 22 nations

The 1966 European Indoor Games were the first edition of what later became the European Athletics Indoor Championships. These games took place on 27 March 1966 at Westfalenhalle, Dortmund, a city of West Germany. It was the only edition held on a single day – since 1967 the duration was extended to two days and since 1992 to three.

The track used for the championships was 160 metres long.

== Medal summary ==
=== Men ===
Event	Gold		Silver		Bronze	
60 metres	Barrie Kelly (GBR)	6.6 =WB	Heinz Erbstößer (GDR)	6.6 =WB	Viktor Kasatkin (URS)	6.6 =WB
400 metres	Hartmut Koch (GDR)	47.9	Manfred Kinder (FRG)	48.3	Vasyl Anisimov (URS)	49.0
800 metres	Noel Carroll (IRL)	1:49.7	Tomáš Jungwirth (TCH)	1:50.8	Herbert Missalla (FRG)	1:51.0
1500 metres	John Whetton (GBR)	3:43.8	Oleg Rayko (URS)	3:46.7	Ulf Högberg (SWE)	3:47.2
3000 metres	Harald Norpoth (FRG)	7:56.0	Siegfried Herrmann (GDR)	7:57.2	István Kiss (HUN)	8:05.0
60 metres hurdles	Eddy Ottoz (ITA)	7.7 =WB	Michael Parker (GBR)	7.8	Hinrich John (FRG)	7.9
4 × 320 metres relay(1280 m)	West Germany; Jörg Jüttner; Rainer Kunter; Hans Reinermann; Jens Ulbrich	2:30.1	Czechoslovakia; Miroslav Veruk; Juraj Demeč; Ladislav Kriz; Josef Trousil	2:31.0	Only two teams started	
Medley relay(1600 m)	West Germany; Leonhard Händl; Werner Krönke; Rolf Krüsmann; Jürgen Schröter	3:22.0	Italy; Bruno Bianchi; Ito Giani; Sergio Ottolina; Sergio Bello	3:22.2	Belgium; Werner Oijzers; Willy Vandewyngaerden; Georges Wijnants; Albert van Hoorn	3:27.2
High jump	Valeriy Skvortsov (URS)	2.17	Wolfgang Schillkowski (FRG)	2.11	Kjell-Åke Nilsson (SWE)	2.08
Pole vault	Hennadiy Bleznitsov (URS)	4.90	Rudolf Tomášek (TCH)	4.80	Rainer Liese (FRG)	4.70
Long jump	Igor Ter-Ovanesyan (URS)	8.23 WB	Armin Baumert (FRG)	7.79	Jochen Eigenherr (FRG)	7.63
Triple jump	Şerban Ciochină (ROM)	16.43	Michael Sauer (FRG)	16.35	Petr Nemsovský (TCH)	16.28
Shot put	Vilmos Varjú (HUN)	19.05	Dieter Hoffmann (GDR)	18.25	Jiří Skobla (TCH)	18.08

=== Women ===
Event	Gold		Silver		Bronze	
60 metres	Margit Nemesházi (HUN)	7.3	Galina Mitrokhina (URS)	7.3	Mary Rand (GBR)	7.4
400 metres	Helga Henning (FRG)	56.9	Libuše Macounová (TCH)	57.2	Maeve Kyle (IRL)	57.3
800 metres	Zsuzsa Szabó-Nagy (HUN)	2:07.9	Karin Kessler (FRG)	2:10.8	Marie Ingrová (TCH)	2:11.6
60 metres hurdles	Irina Press (URS)	8.1 WB	Gundula Diel (GDR)	8.4	Inge Schell (FRG)	8.4
4 × 160 metres relay	West Germany; Renate Meyer; Erika Rost; Hannelore Trabert; Kirsten Roggenkamp	1:18.4	Yugoslavia; Ljiljana Petnjarić; Marijana Lubej; Jelisaveta Đanić; Olga Šikovec	1:21.7	Czechoslovakia; Libuše Macounová; Alena Hiltscherová; Eva Kucmanová; Eva Lehocká	1:22.3
High jump	Iolanda Balaș (ROM)	1.76	Olga Gere-Pulić (YUG)	1.73	Ilia Hans (FRG)	1.65
Long jump	Tatyana Shchelkanova (URS)	6.73 WB	Mary Rand (GBR)	6.53	Heide Rosendahl (FRG)	6.54
Shot put	Margitta Gummel (GDR)	17.30	Tamara Press (URS)	17.00	Nadezhda Chizhova (URS)	16.95

== Medal table ==
Rank	Nation	Gold	Silver	Bronze	Total
1	West Germany (FRG)	5	5	7	17
2	Soviet Union (URS)	5	3	3	11
3	Hungary (HUN)	3	0	1	4
4	East Germany (GDR)	2	4	0	6
5	Great Britain (GBR)	2	2	1	5
6	Romania (ROU)	2	0	0	2
7	Italy (ITA)	1	1	0	2
8	Ireland (IRL)	1	0	1	2
9	Czechoslovakia (TCH)	0	4	4	8
10	Yugoslavia (YUG)	0	2	0	2
11	Sweden (SWE)	0	0	2	2
12	Belgium (BEL)	0	0	1	1
Totals (12 entries)		21	21	20	62

== Participating nations ==
- Austria (1)
- Belgium (13)
- Czechoslovakia (19)
- Denmark (3)
- East Germany (8)
- France (11)
- Great Britain (8)
- Greece (2)
- Hungary (8)
- Iceland (1)
- Ireland (2)
- Italy (12)
- Netherlands (2)
- Norway (4)
- Romania (3)
- Soviet Union (13)
- Spain (6)
- Sweden (8)
- Switzerland (9)
- Turkey (2)
- West Germany (40)
- Yugoslavia (11)
