= 1972 European Athletics Indoor Championships – Women's long jump =

The women's long jump event at the 1972 European Athletics Indoor Championships was held on 12 March in Grenoble.

== Results ==
Rank	Name	Nationality	#1	#2	#3	#4	#5	#6	Result	Notes
1st place, gold medalist(s)	Brigitte Roesen	West Germany	x	6.42	x	x	x	6.58	6.58	
2nd place, silver medalist(s)	Meta Antenen	Switzerland	6.35	6.36	6.39	x	6.36	6.42	6.42	NR
3rd place, bronze medalist(s)	Jarmila Nygrýnová	Czechoslovakia	6.39	x	6.28	6.33	6.04	6.32	6.39	
4	Sieglinde Ammann	Switzerland	6.22	x	6.26	6.21	6.20	6.20	6.26	
5	Maureen Chitty	Great Britain	6.26	6.15	x	x	6.13	6.11	6.26	
6	Elena Vintilă	Romania	6.26	x	x	x	x	x	6.26	
7	Diana Yorgova	Bulgaria	6.21	x	6.12	x	6.18	x	6.21	
8	Viorica Viscopoleanu	Romania	6.01	x	x	5.61	x	x	6.01	
9	Ruth Martin-Jones	Great Britain	5.99	x	6.00				6.00	
10	Marie-Pascale Guillet	France	x	5.42	5.56				5.56	
