= Meta Antenen =

Swiss pentathlete (born 1949)

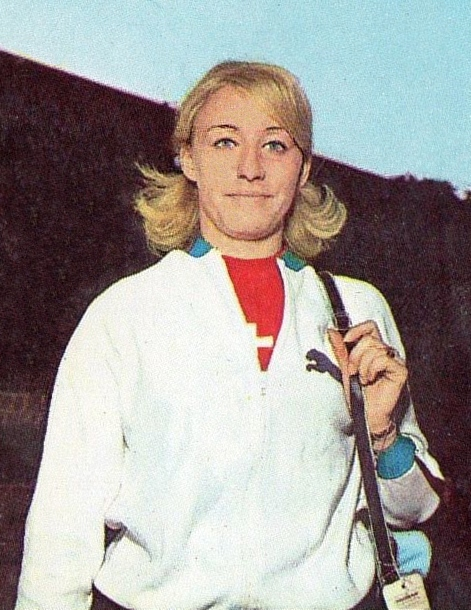
- Meta Antenen c. 1972

Personal information
- Born: 7 April 1949 (age 77) Orpund, Switzerland
- Height: 168 cm (5 ft 6 in)
- Weight: 56 kg (123 lb)

Sport
- Sport: Athletics
- Event: Women's pentathlon
- Club: Leichtathletik-Club Schaffhausen Basel

Achievements and titles
- Personal bests: 80 mH – 10.78 (1968); 100 mH – 13.0 (1974); 100 m – 11.4 (1970); LJ – 6.73 m (1971); Pentathlon – 4848 (1968)
Medal record
Women's athletics
Representing Switzerland
European Championships
Silver medal – second place	1969 Athens	Pentathlon
Silver medal – second place	1971 Helsinki	Long jump
European Indoor Championships
Gold medal – first place	1974 Gothenburg	Long jump
Silver medal – second place	1969 Belgrade	50 m hurdles
Silver medal – second place	1972 Grenoble	Long jump
Bronze medal – third place	1969 Belgrade	Long jump
Bronze medal – third place	1972 Grenoble	50 m hurdles
Bronze medal – third place	1974 Gothenburg	60 m hurdles
Bronze medal – third place	1975 Katowice	Long jump

Meta Antenen (born 7 April 1949) is a retired Swiss pentathlete. Between 1969 and 1975 she won nine medals at the European championships, mostly in the long jump and hurdles. She competed at the 1968 and 1972 Olympics in four events in total and placed eighth in the pentathlon in 1968 and sixth in the long jump in 1972. Antenen was selected as the Swiss Sports Personality of the Year in 1966 and 1971. Her husband Georges Mathys is an Olympic Swiss field hockey player.

== International competitions ==
Year	Competition	Venue	Position	Event	Notes
Representing Switzerland
1966	European Indoor Games	Dortmund, West Germany	9th (sf)	60 m hurdles	8.7
1966	European Indoor Games	Dortmund, West Germany	6th	Long jump	5.83 m
1966	European Championships	Budapest, Hungary	14th (h)	80 m hurdles	11.2^{1}
1966	European Championships	Budapest, Hungary	8th	Long jump	6.23 m
1966	European Championships	Budapest, Hungary	7th	Pentathlon	3815 pts
1966	European Junior Games	Odessa, Soviet Union	1st	80 m hurdles	11.1
1966	European Junior Games	Odessa, Soviet Union	1st	Pentathlon	4609 pts
1967	European Indoor Games	Prague, Czechoslovakia	6th	50 m hurdles	7.2
1967	European Indoor Games	Prague, Czechoslovakia	5th	Long jump	6.11 m
1968	European Indoor Games	Madrid, Spain	6th (sf)	50 m hurdles	7.16
1968	European Indoor Games	Madrid, Spain	6th	Long jump	6.08 m
1968	Olympic Games	Munich, West Germany	14th (h)	80 m hurdles	10.9
1968	Olympic Games	Munich, West Germany	8th	Pentathlon	4848 pts
1969	European Indoor Games	Belgrade, Serbia	2nd	50 m hurdles	7.3
1969	European Indoor Games	Belgrade, Serbia	3rd	Long jump	6.15 m
1969	European Championships	Athens, Greece	12th	Long jump	6.13 m
1969	European Championships	Athens, Greece	2nd	Pentathlon	4210 pts
1970	European Indoor Championships	Vienna, Austria	8th (sf)	60 m hurdles	8.7
1970	European Indoor Championships	Vienna, Austria	6th	Long jump	6.36 m
1971	European Indoor Championships	Sofia, Bulgaria	4th	60 m hurdles	8.3
1971	European Indoor Championships	Sofia, Bulgaria	4th	Long jump	6.33 m
1971	European Championships	Helsinki, Finland	7th (h)	100 m	11.79^{1}
1971	European Championships	Helsinki, Finland	5th	100 m hurdles	13.35
1971	European Championships	Helsinki, Finland	2nd	Long jump	6.73 m
1972	European Indoor Championships	Grenoble, France	4th	50 m hurdles	7.05
1972	European Indoor Championships	Grenoble, France	2nd	Long jump	6.42 m
1972	Olympic Games	Munich, West Germany	17th (h)	100 m hurdles	13.61^{2}
1972	Olympic Games	Munich, West Germany	6th	Long jump	6.49 m
1973	European Indoor Championships	Rotterdam, Netherlands	4th	60 m hurdles	8.27
1973	European Indoor Championships	Rotterdam, Netherlands	5th	Long jump	6.08 m
1974	European Indoor Championships	Gothenburg, Sweden	3rd	60 m hurdles	8.19
1974	European Indoor Championships	Gothenburg, Sweden	1st	Long jump	6.69 m
1974	European Championships	Rome, Italy	8th	Long jump	6.33 m
1975	European Indoor Championships	Katowice, Poland	6th	60 m hurdles	8.60
1975	European Indoor Championships	Katowice, Poland	3rd	Long jump	6.28 m
1976	European Indoor Championships	Munich, West Germany	9th (h)	60 m hurdles	8.59
1976	European Indoor Championships	Munich, West Germany	7th	Long jump	6.22 m

^{1}Did not start in the semifinals
^{2}Did not finish in the semifinals
