= Veinge =

- Location within Halland Location within Sweden
- Coordinates: 56°33′N 13°04′E
- Country: Sweden
- Province: Halland
- County: Halland County
- Municipality: Laholm Municipality

Area
  - Total: 1.31 km^{2} (0.51 sq mi)

Population (31 December 2010)
  - Total: 1,190
  - Density: 910/km^{2} (2,400/sq mi)
- Time zone: UTC+1 (CET)
  - Summer (DST): UTC+2 (CEST)

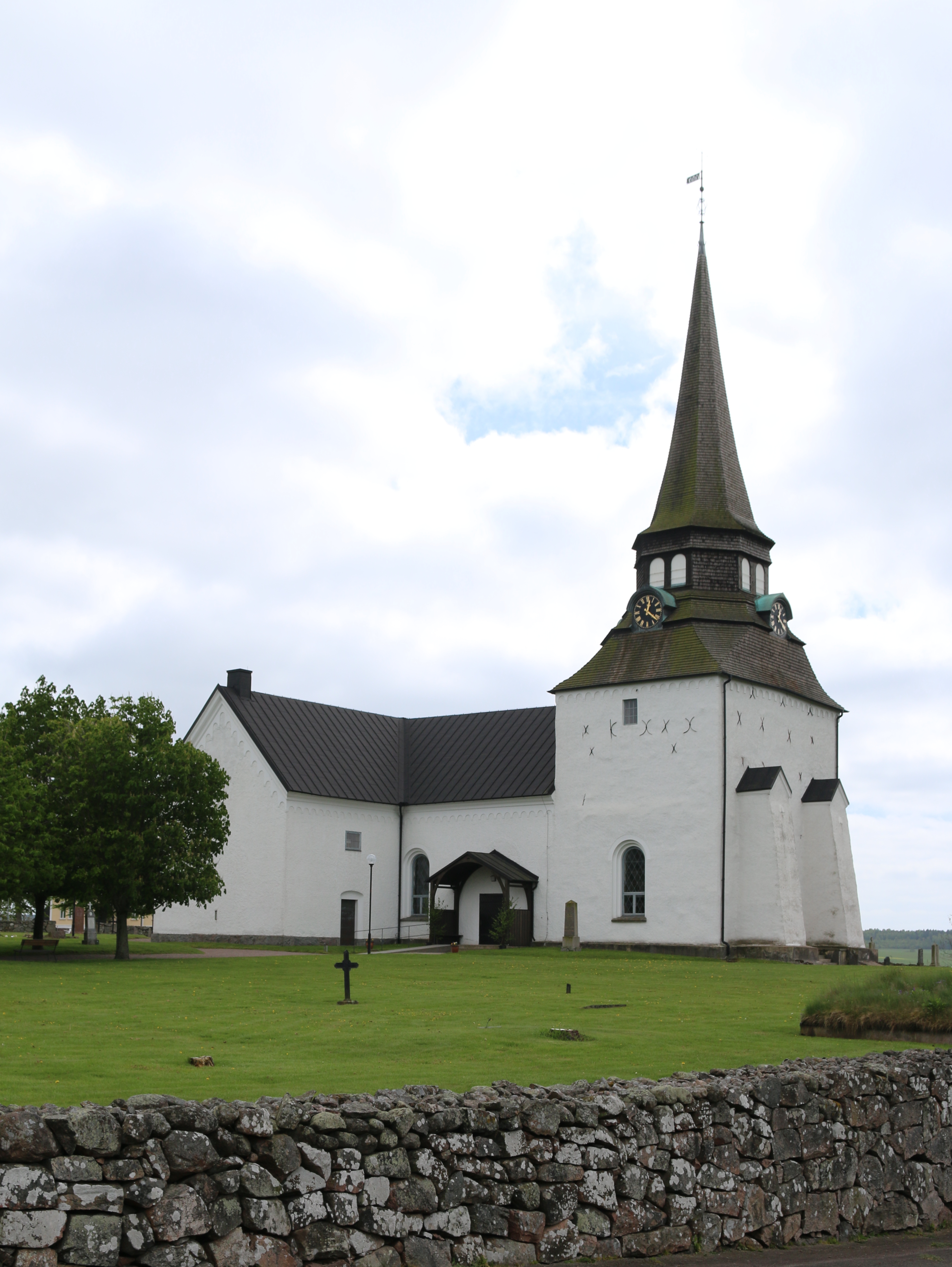
Church in Veinge

Veinge is a locality situated in Laholm Municipality, Halland County, Sweden with 1,190 inhabitants in 2010.
