= Eva Glesková =

Personal information
- Born: 26 July 1943 (age 82) Zvolen, Slovakia

Sport
- Sport: Track and field
Medal record
Representing Czechoslovakia
European Indoor Championships
Silver medal – second place	1967 Prague	4x150m relay
Bronze medal – third place	1966 Dortmund	4x160m relay

Eva Glesková (née Lehocká; born 26 July 1943) is a Slovak former track and field sprinter who specialised in the 100 metres. She represented Czechoslovakia three times at the Summer Olympics (1964, 1968, 1972) and twice at the European Athletics Championships (1966, 1969). She equalled the world record for the 100 m in 1972 with a manually-timed run of 11.0 seconds. She was twice a relay medallist at the European Indoor Games and a 13-time national champion in the individual sprints.

== Career ==
Born Eva Lehocká in Zvolen, Slovakia, she took up athletics at the age of fifteen, training with local coaches in Zvolen. She began to take the sport more seriously after a move to Bratislava, where she joined the Slávia STU club and worked with coach Antona Hajmássyho. She gained her first national title over 200 metres at the Czechoslovak Athletics Championships in 1962. She won that title three years running and in 1964 set championship records with a 100 m/200 m sprint double. These performances gained her selection for the 1964 Tokyo Olympics, where she a semi-finalist in both disciplines.

She married a fellow athlete and coach Pavol Glesk in the mid-1960s and under Glesk she became part of a high quality era of Czechoslovak female athletes alongside European 400 m champion Anna Chmelková and Eva Šuranová (an Olympic long jump medallist).

After missing the 1965 season she returned in 1966 with her first major international medal – a bronze in the relay alongside Libuše Macounová, Alena Hiltscherová and Eva Kucmanová. She regained her national title sprint double with new championship records of 11.7 and 24.1 seconds. At the 1966 European Athletics Championships she came close to medal in the 100 m, finishing a tenth of a second behind West Germany's Karin Frisch to take fourth place. She was sixth in the 200 m final and also ran with the Czechoslovak 4 × 100 metres relay team. That season she set a 100 m best of 11.5 seconds, which ranked her ninth in the world.

Her sole high-profile appearance the following season was the 1967 European Indoor Games in Prague, where she won a relay silver medal. She broke the European record for the electronically-timed 100 m with a run of 11.29 seconds at the 1968 Mexico City Olympics, though this was not ratified as a record as Irena Kirszenstein's manually-timed 11.1 remained superior. At the Olympics she was a 100 m semi-finalist but was eliminated in the first round of the 200 m. She was again a double Czechoslovak sprint champion that season.

Her last two seasons of high level competition were in 1969 and 1972 and she went undefeated nationally both those years. She entered the 1969 European Athletics Championships, coming seventh in the 100 m. She achieved her fastest 100 m mark in the last year of her career in 1972. Her manually-timed run of 11 seconds flat equalled that set already by Wyomia Tyus in 1968 and matched by Chi Cheng, Renate Stecher and Ellen Stropahl in the intervening years. She remains the only Slovak woman to have equalled a world record in athletics. The 1972 Summer Olympics was the last major outing for her and she reached the final, although an injury sustained in the semi-final meant she finished last in the event final and subsequently retired at age 29.

Over the course of her career she had broken the Czechoslovak record on 57 occasions: eight times in the 60 metres, five times in the 100-yard dash, 21 times in the 100 m, seven times in the 200 m and 16 times in the 4 × 100 metres relay.

== International competitions ==
Year	Competition	Venue	Position	Event	Notes
1964	Olympic Games	Tokyo, Japan	7th (semis)	100 m	11.91
1964	Olympic Games	Tokyo, Japan	6th (semis)	200 m	24.5
1966	European Indoor Games	Dortmund, West Germany	3rd	4 × 1 lap	1:22.3
1966	European Championships	Budapest, Hungary	4th	100 m	11.9
1966	European Championships	Budapest, Hungary	6th	200 m	24.0
1966	European Championships	Budapest, Hungary	5th (heats)	4 × 100 m relay	46.0
1967	European Indoor Games	Prague, Czechoslovakia	2nd	4 × 150 m relay	1:14.0
1968	Olympic Games	Mexico City, Mexico	6th (semis)	100 m	11.80
1968	Olympic Games	Mexico City, Mexico	5th (heats)	200 m	24.08
1969	European Championships	Athens, Greece	7th	100 m	11.90
1972	Olympic Games	Munich, West Germany	8th	100 m	12.48

== National titles ==
- Czechoslovak Athletics Championships
  - 100 metres: 1964, 1966, 1967, 1968, 1969, 1972
  - 200 metres: 1962, 1963, 1964, 1966, 1968, 1969, 1972

Records
Preceded by Irena Szewińska	Women's 100 metres world record co-holder (with Wyomia Tyus, Chi Cheng, Renate Stecher, Ellen Stropahl); 1 July 1972 – 7 June 1973	Succeeded by Renate Stecher
