= Corrie Bakker =

Dutch track and field athlete

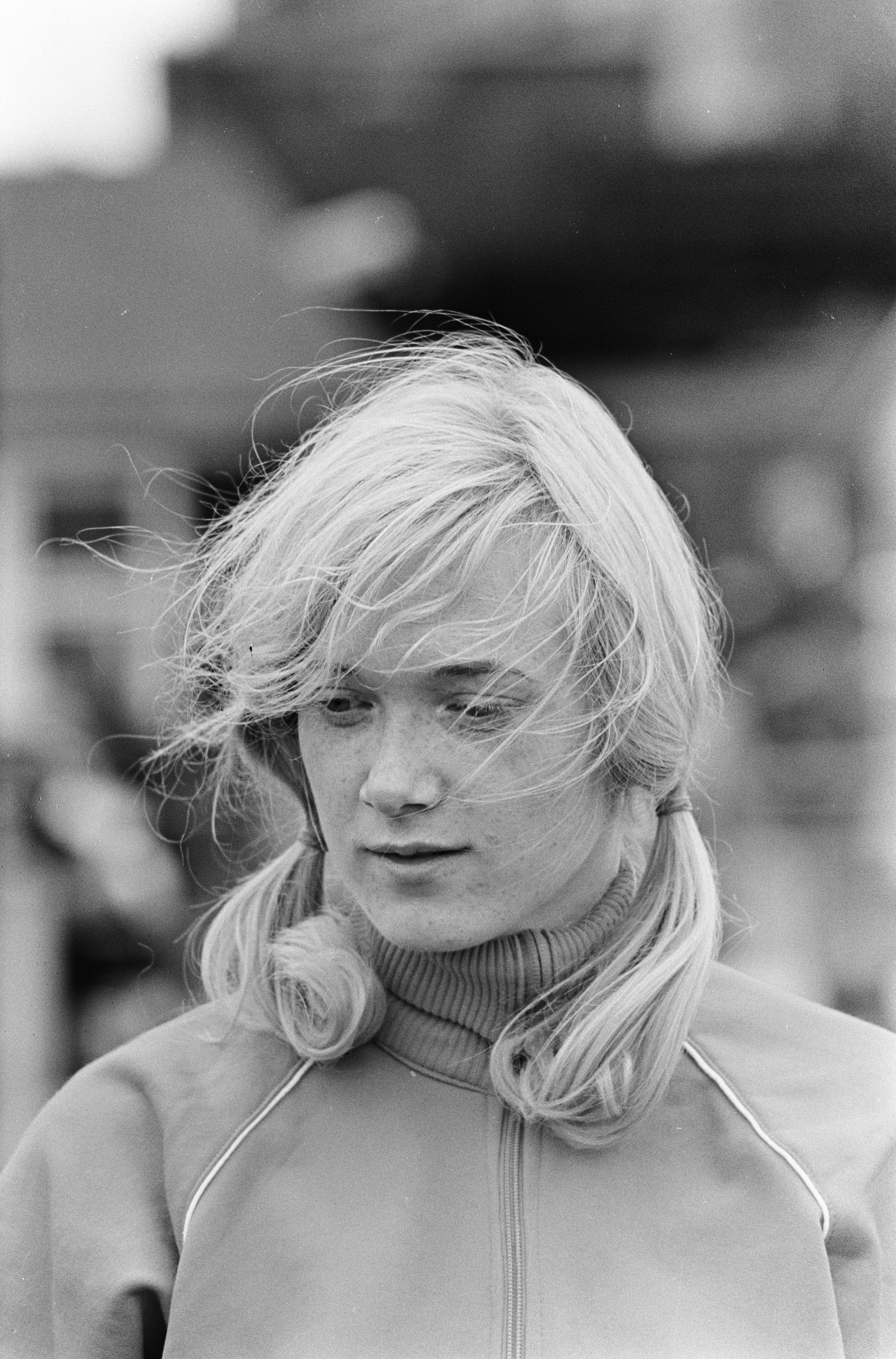
- Corrie Bakker in 1966

Personal information
- Born: 15 June 1945 (age 81) Utrecht, Netherlands
- Height: 1.76 m (5 ft 9 in)
- Weight: 63 kg (139 lb)

Sport
- Sport: Athletics
- Event(s): Sprint, pentathlon, long jump
- Club: Sagitta, Amsterdam

Cornelia Johanna Marretje "Corrie" Bakker (later Stigter, born 15 June 1945) is a retired track and field athlete from the Netherlands who competed at the 1968 Summer Olympics.

== Biography ==
Bakker finished third behind Berit Berthelsen in the long jump event at the British 1966 WAAA Championships.

At the 1968 Olympic Games in Mexico City, Bakker was part of the Dutch 4 × 100 m relay team that finished fourth. Her personal best in the 100 m was 11.7 seconds (1965).

After retiring from competition, in 1972 she married John Stigter, and in 1975 gave birth to a son.

Awards
Preceded by Ilja Laman; Hilde Slaman-van Doorn	KNAU Cup; 1966	Succeeded by Mia Gommers
