= Elżbieta Żebrowska =

Polish athlete (1945–2021)

Elżbieta Żebrowska née Bednarek
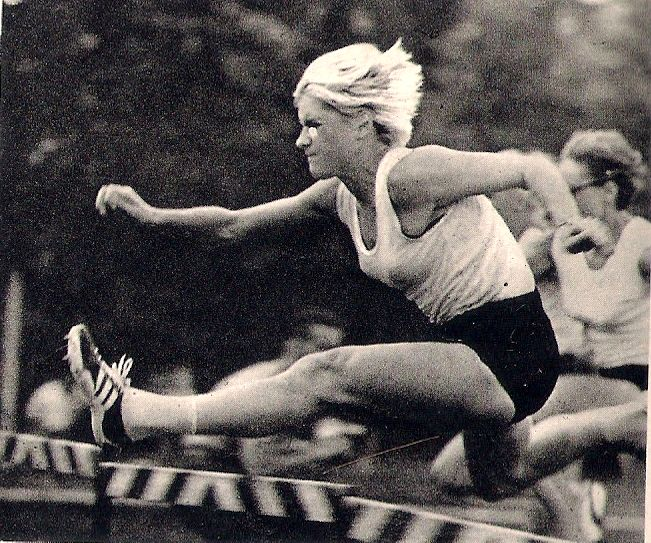
- Elzbieta Zebrowska (1968

Personal information
- Nationality: Polish
- Born: 27 March 1945 Warsaw, Mazowieckie, Poland
- Died: 23 December 2021 (aged 76) Warsaw, Mazowieckie, Poland
- Height: 165 cm (5 ft 5 in)
- Weight: 58 kg (128 lb)

Sport
- Sport: Athletics
- Event: hurdles
- Club: Warszawianka
Medal record
Women's athletics
Representing Poland
European Championships
Gold medal – first place	1966 Budapest	4×100 m
Bronze medal – third place	1966 Budapest	80 m hurdles

Elżbieta Regina Żebrowska (née Bednarek, 27 March 1945 – 23 December 2021) was a Polish athlete who competed mainly in the 80 metres hurdles and competed at the 1968 Summer Olympics.

== Biography ==
Bednarek, born in Warsaw, finished third behind Pat Jones in the 80 metres hurdles event at the British 1965 WAAA Championships. One year later at she was a gold medallist at the 1966 European Championships in Budapest in the 4 × 100 metres relay with Danuta Straszyńska, Irena Kirszenstein and Ewa Kłobukowska, and won the bronze medal in the 80 metres hurdles.

At the 1968 Olympic Games in Mexico City, representing Poland, she finished seventh in the final of the 80 metres hurdles in 10.6 seconds.

Żebrowska died on 23 December 2021, at the age of 76.
