= Danielle Guéneau =

French sprinter and hurdler

Personal information
- Nationality: France
- Born: 21 August 1947 (age 78) Pornic
- Height: 1.64 m (5 ft 5 in)

Sport
- Event(s): 100m, 80 metres hurdles
- Club: Racing Club de France

Danielle Guéneau (married name Ménard; born 21 August 1947 in Pornic) is a former French athlete, who specialised in the sprints and hurdles.

== Biography ==
She won three championship titles of France: 80 Metres Hurdles in 1966 and 1967, and the 100m 1964.

She set six times the French record for the 4 × 100 Metres Relay in 1964, 1966 and 1967.

She participated in the 1964 Olympic Games at Tokyo. She was a quarter-finalist in the 100m and took eighth in the 4 × 100 m relay.

=== Prize list ===
- French Championships in Athletics:
  - winner of the 80m hurdles in 1966 and 1967.
  - winner of 100 m 1964

=== Records ===
Personal records
Event	Performance	Location	Date
100 m	11 s 7		1964

== notes and references ==
- Siukonen, Markku; Ahola, Matti (1990), Sporttikustannus Oy (ed.), Suuri EM-kirja (in Finnish), Sporttikustannus, p. 87, ISBN 951-8920-11-7
- Fédération Française d'Athlétisme, ed. (2003), Docathlé2003 (in French), Fédération française d'athlétisme, pp. 45, 118, 176, 407, ISBN 2-9512343-3-3
