= Galina Mitrokhina (track athlete) =

Russian sprinter and pentathlete

Personal information
- Born: 9 February 1944 (age 82)

Sport
- Sport: Sprint running, pentathlon/heptathlon
- Club: Dynamo (since 1961)
Medal record
Representing the Soviet Union
European Athletics Indoor Championships
Silver medal – second place	1966 Dortmund	60 m

Galina Dmitrievna Mitrokhina (Russian: Галина Дмитриевна Митрохина; born 9 February 1944) is a retired Russian sprinter and pentathlete. She won a silver medal in the 60 m at the 1966 European Indoor Games, and a bronze medal in the 100 m at the 1965 European Cup.
