= Irina Press =

Soviet athlete (1939–2004)

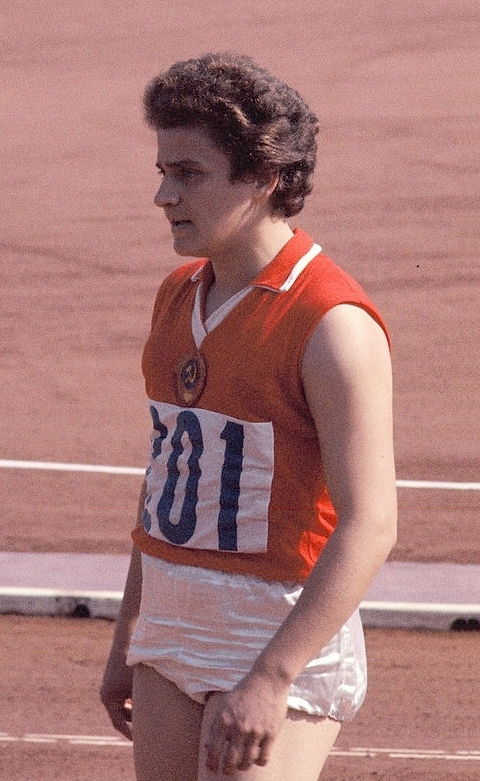
- Irina Press at the 1964 Olympics

Personal information
- Born: 10 March 1939 Kharkov, Ukrainian SSR, Soviet Union
- Died: 22 February 2004 (aged 64) Moscow, Russia
- Height: 1.68 m (5 ft 6 in)
- Weight: 75 kg (165 lb)

Sport
- Sport: Pentathlon, sprint running, shot put
- Club: Dynamo St. Petersburg; Dynamo Moscow
Medal record
Representing Soviet Union
Olympic Games
Gold medal – first place	1960 Rome	80 metre hurdles
Gold medal – first place	1964 Tokyo	Pentathlon
European Indoor Championships
Gold medal – first place	1966 Dortmund	60 metre hurdles
Summer Universiade
Gold medal – first place	1961 Sofia	80 metre hurdles
Gold medal – first place	1961 Sofia	4x100m relay
Silver medal – second place	1961 Sofia	Shot put

Irina Natanovna Press (Note: Russian: Ирина Натановна Пресс, Ukrainian: Ірина Натанівна Пресс, Iryna Natanivna Press) (10 March 1939 – 22 February 2004) was a Soviet athlete who competed at the 1960 and 1964 Olympics. In 1960, she won a gold medal in the 80 m hurdles and finished fourth in the 4 × 100 m relay. In 1964, she finished fourth in the hurdles and sixth in the shot put, but won gold in the newly introduced pentathlon event.

Together with her elder sister, Tamara, Irina set 26 world records between 1959 and 1966. In 1967, she won her last USSR Championship. Both Press sisters ended their careers abruptly when gender verification was introduced. Some have suggested that the Press sisters were male or intersex. Another allegation was that they were being injected with male hormones by the Soviet government in order to make them stronger. In wartime Soviet evacuation lists from 1942 (at age 3) Irina Press is documented as a girl.

After retiring from competitions, Press earned a degree in physical education and coached at her club Dynamo Moscow. She also took posts in the Soviet sports administration, such as department head of the Soviet and later Russian State Committee on Physical Culture, Sports and Tourism. From 2000 and until her death in 2004, she headed the Moscow Committee of Physical Culture and Sports.
