= Renate Meyer (sprinter) =

German sprinter (born 1938)

Personal information
- Nationality: FRG
- Born: January 6, 1938 (age 88) Hanover, Germany
- Height: 5 ft 5 in (165 cm)
- Weight: 54 kg (119 lb)

Sport
- Sport: Athletics
- Event: Sprinting

Achievements and titles
- Personal best: 100 m: 11.4 (1964)
Medal record
Women's athletics
Representing West Germany
European Championships
Silver medal – second place	1966 Budapest	4×100 m

Renate Meyer (born 6 January 1938) is a former German sprinter. She competed in sprint events at both the 1964 and 1968 Summer Olympics.

She also won a silver medal in the women's 4 × 100 m relay at the 1966 European Athletics Championships in Budapest.
