= Liudmila Ievleva =

Ukrainian hurdler

Personal information
- Nationality: Ukrainian
- Born: 4 April 1941 (age 85)

Sport
- Sport: Track and field
- Event: 80 metres hurdles

Liudmila Ievleva (born 4 April 1941) is a Ukrainian hurdler. She competed in the women's 80 metres hurdles at the 1968 Summer Olympics, representing the Soviet Union.
