= Ulla-Britt Wieslander =

Swedish sprinter (1942–2023)

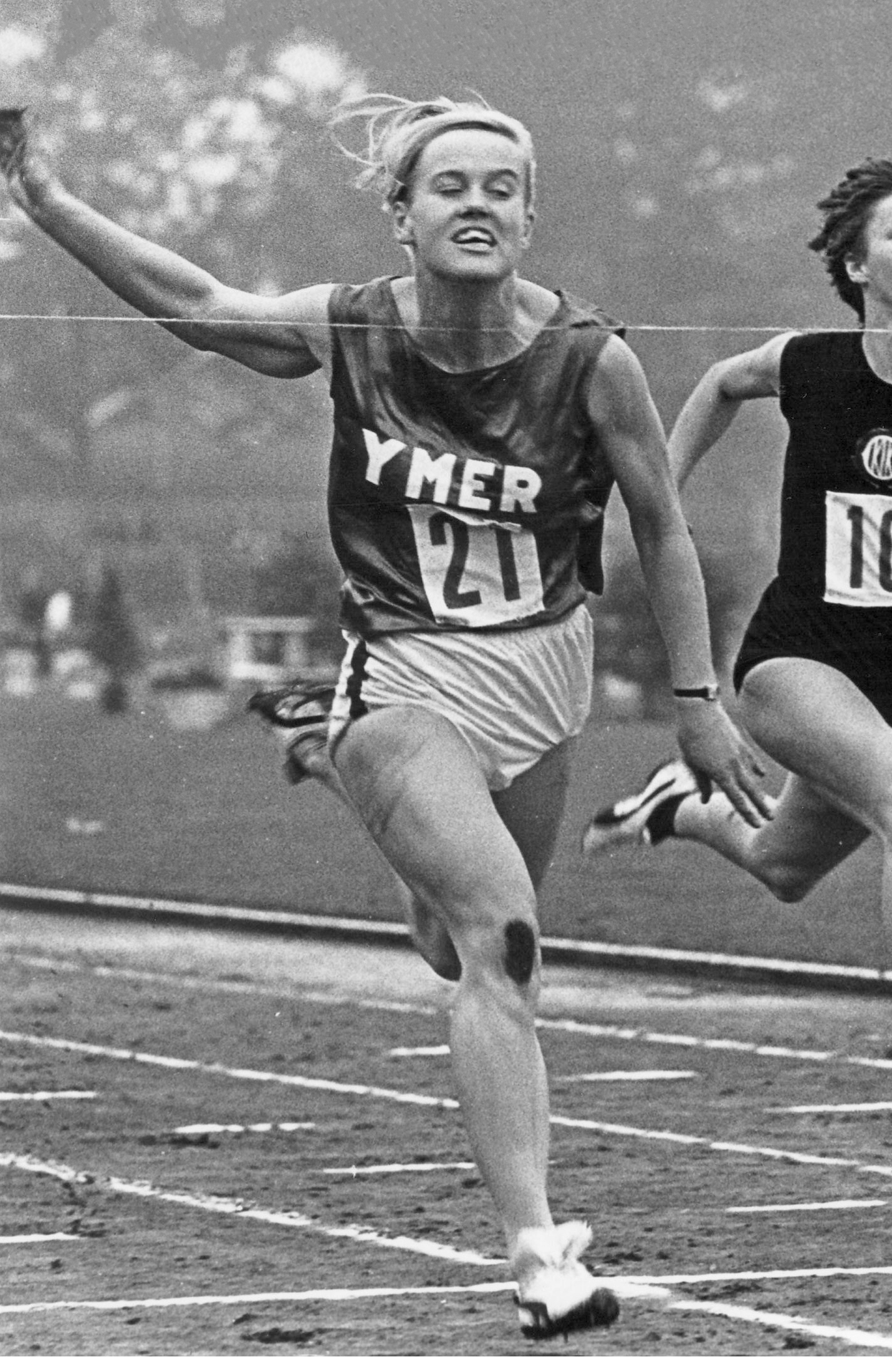
- Wieslander winning the national 100 m title in 1965

Personal information
- Born: 10 June 1942 Borås, Sweden
- Died: 29 November 2023 (aged 81) Veinge, Sweden
- Height: 1.68 m (5 ft 6 in)
- Weight: 54 kg (119 lb)

Sport
- Sport: Athletics
- Event(s): 100 m, 200 m, 80 m hurdles
- Club: IK Ymer, Borås

Achievements and titles
- Personal best(s): 100 m – 11.86 (1968); 200 m – 24.2 (1964); 80 mH – 10.7 (1968)

Ulla-Britt Wieslander (later Rosberg, 10 June 1942 – 29 November 2023) was a Swedish sprinter. She competed at the 1960, 1964 and 1968 Summer Olympics in the 100 m, 200 m and 80 m hurdles (five events in total), but failed to reach the final in any contest. Between 1959 and 1966 she won more than 20 national titles in the 80 m hurdles, 100 m, 200 m, 4 × 100 m and 4 × 200 m events. Wieslander died in Veinge on 29 November 2023, at the age of 81.
