= Regina Höfer =

Former German athlete

Regina Höfer née Pippig
Personal information
- Nationality: East German
- Born: 18 October 1947 (age 78) Leipzig, Soviet occupation zone in Germany

Sport
- Sport: Athletics
- Event: hurdles
Medal record
Women's athletics
Representing East Germany
European Championships
Gold medal – first place	1969 Athens	4×100 m

Regina Höfer (née Pippig; born 18 October 1947, in ) is a retired East German athlete who specialized in the 100 metres and 100 metres hurdles.

== Biography ==
Höfer competed in 80 metres hurdles competition at the 1966 European Championships finishing 8th in the second semi-final.

Höfer finished third behind Pat Jones in the 80 metres hurdles event at the British 1967 WAAA Championships.

In 1968 she joined the sports club SC DHfK Leipzig, and trained under coach Karl-Heinz Balzer and with fellow athletes like Karin Balzer and Christina Heinich. The following year she won a gold medal in 4 × 100 metres relay at the 1969 European Championships, together with teammates Bärbel Podeswa, Renate Meißner and Petra Vogt.
