= Gundula Diel =

German hurdler

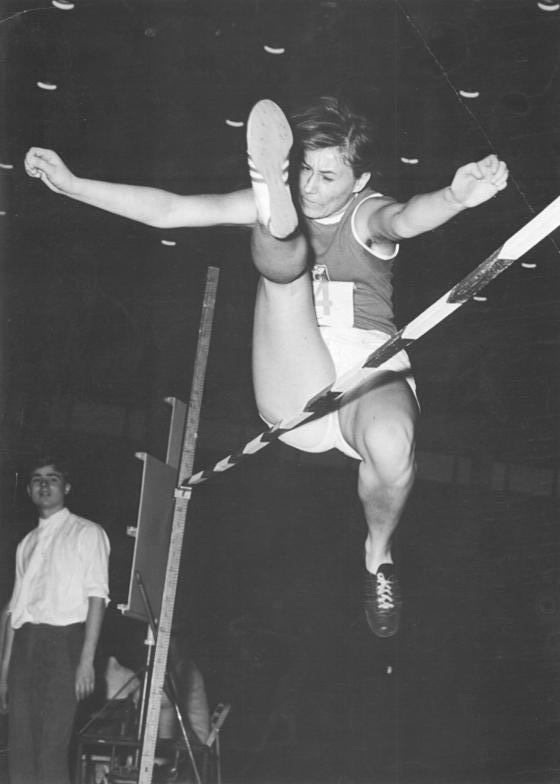
- Gundula Diel in 1962

Personal information
- Nationality: German
- Born: 13 May 1941 (age 85) Potsdam, Germany

Sport
- Sport: Track and field
- Event: 80 metres hurdles

Gundula Diel (born 13 May 1941) is a German hurdler. She competed in the women's 80 metres hurdles at the 1964 Summer Olympics.
