= Alena Stolzová =

Czech sprinter

Personal information
- Nationality: Czech
- Born: 6 November 1937 (age 87)

Sport
- Country: Czechoslovakia
- Sport: Sprinting
- Event: 200 metres

Alena Stolzová (born 6 November 1937) is a Czech sprinter. She competed for Czechoslovakia in the women's 200 metres at the 1960 Summer Olympics.
