= Tatyana Talysheva =

Soviet long jumper

Olympic medal record

Women's Athletics
Bronze medal – third place	1968 Mexico City	Long jump

Tatyana Talysheva (Russian: Татьяна Талышева) (born 15 October 1937) is a Soviet athlete who competed mainly in the Long Jump.

Talysheva trained at Dynamo in Moscow. She competed for USSR in the 1968 Summer Olympics held in Mexico City, Mexico in the Long Jump where she won the bronze medal.
