= Vlasta Přikrylová =

Czechoslovak long jumper

Personal information
- Nationality: Czech
- Born: 1 July 1943 (age 83) Prague, Protectorate of Bohemia and Moravia

Sport
- Sport: Athletics
- Event: Long jump
Medal record
Representing Czechoslovakia
European Indoor Championships
| Silver medal – second place | 1967 Prague | 50m hurdles |
| Silver medal – second place | 1967 Prague | 4x150m relay |
| Silver medal – second place | 1968 Madrid | 1820m medley relay |
Summer Universiade
| Silver medal – second place | 1963 Porto Alegre | Long jump |

Vlasta Přikrylová (née Seifertová; born 1 July 1943) is a Czech track and field athlete. She competed in the women's long jump at the 1960 Summer Olympics.
