= Berit Berthelsen =

Norwegian sprinter and long jumper (1944–2022)

Berit Berthelsen née Tøien
Personal information
- Nationality: Norwegian
- Born: 5 April 1944 in Hakadal, Nittedal, Viken, Norway
- Died: 13 February 2022 (aged 77) Bærum, Viken, Norway
- Height: 171 cm (5 ft 7 in)
- Weight: 62 kg (137 lb)

Sport
- Sport: Athletics
- Event(s): Sprints, long jump, pentathlon
- Club: IL Tyrving, Bærum
Medal record
Women's athletics
Representing Norway
European Championships
Bronze medal – third place	1969 Athens	Long jump

Berit Berthelsen (née Tøien, 25 April 1944 – 13 February 2022) was a Norwegian athlete. She represented IL Tyrving, as well as her national team.

== Biography ==
Born in Norway, Berthelsen was educated at the Norwegian School of Sport Sciences. Berthelsen dominated long jump and sprints events in the Nordic countries during the 1960s. At the Nordic Championships in 1965 she won five gold medals (100 m, 200 m, 400 m, long jump and relay). She won the European Indoor Games in long jump in 1967 and 1968, and won a European Championships bronze medal in 1969. She finished seventh at the 1964 Summer Olympics and ninth at the 1968 Summer Olympics. In 1968 she also competed in pentathlon, finishing eighteenth.

Throughout her career she won 35 national championships in individual events, and set 29 national records. Her long jump record of 6.56 metres was set on 10 September 1968 and stood for almost 41 years until Margrethe Renstrøm broke it on 1 August 2009, with a 6.64 m jump. She finished second behind Mary Rand in the long jump event at the British 1964 WAAA Championships.

Berthelsen won the British WAAA Championships title at the 1966 WAAA Championships and the 1967 WAAA Championships.

She died on 13 February 2022, at the age of 77.

== Achievements ==
Year	Competition	Venue	Position	Notes
Representing Norway
1967	European Indoor Games	Prague, Czechoslovakia	1st	Long jump
1968	European Indoor Games	Madrid, Spain	1st	Long jump
1969	European Championships	Athens, Greece	3rd	Long jump
