= Inge Schell =

German hurdler

Personal information
- Nationality: German
- Born: 9 June 1939 Neubiberg, Germany
- Died: 19 November 2025 (aged 86) Munich, Germany

Sport
- Sport: Track and field
- Event: 80 metres hurdles

Inge Schell (9 June 1939 – 19 November 2025) was a German hurdler. She competed in the women's 80 metres hurdles at the 1968 Summer Olympics, representing West Germany.
