= Viorica Viscopoleanu =

Romanian long jumper (born 1939)

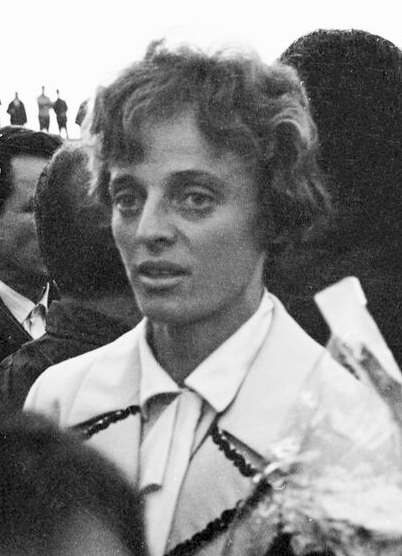
- Viscopoleanu in 1968

Personal information
- Born: Belmega; 8 August 1939 (age 86) Storojineț, Kingdom of Romania
- Height: 164 cm (5 ft 5 in)
- Weight: 55 kg (121 lb)

Sport
- Sport: Athletics
- Event: Long jump
- Club: CSA Steaua București
- Coached by: Ion Vintila; Ion Soter

Achievements and titles
- Personal best: 6.82 m (1968)
Medal record
Women's athletics
Representing Romania
Olympic Games
Gold medal – first place	1968 Mexico City	Long jump
European Championships
Silver medal – second place	1969 Athens	Long jump
European Indoor Championships
Gold medal – first place	1970 Vienna	Long jump
Bronze medal – third place	1971 Sofia	Long jump
Summer Universiade
Silver medal – second place	1965 Budapest	Long jump

Viorica Viscopoleanu (née Belmega, born 8 August 1939) is a retired Romanian long jumper. She competed at the 1964, 1968 and 1972 Olympics and won a gold medal in 1968, setting a new world record. At the European championships she won a silver medal outdoors in 1969 and two medals indoors, in 1970 (gold) and 1971 (bronze). After retiring from competitions she worked as a coach at her club Steaua București. Monica Iagăr was one of her trainees.
