= Eva Šuranová =

Slovak athlete

Personal information
- Born: 24 April 1946 Ózd, Hungary
- Died: 31 December 2016 (aged 70) Bratislava, Slovakia

Sport
- Sport: Track and field
Medal record
Representing Czechoslovakia
Olympic Games
Bronze medal – third place	1972 Munich	Long Jump
European Championships
Silver medal – second place	1974 Rome	Long jump

Eva Šuranová (née Kucmanová, 24 April 1946 − 31 December 2016) was a Slovak athlete, who competed mainly in the long jump.

Šuranová competed for Czechoslovakia in the 1972 Summer Olympics held in Munich, West Germany, in the long jump, where she won the bronze medal.
