= Marijana Lubej =

Slovenian sprinter

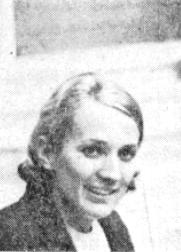

Personal information
- Nationality: Slovenian
- Born: 21 June 1945 (age 80) Celje, Yugoslavia

Sport
- Sport: Sprinting
- Event: 100 metres

Marijana Lubej (born 21 June 1945) is a Slovenian former sprinter.

== Career ==
She competed in the Women's 100 Metres at the 1968 Summer Olympics.
