= Athletics at the 1983 Summer Universiade – Women's 100 metres hurdles =

The women's 100 metres hurdles event at the 1983 Summer Universiade was held at the Commonwealth Stadium in Edmonton, Canada on 6 and 7 July 1983.

== Medalists ==
Gold	Silver	Bronze
Natalya Petrova; Soviet Union	Yelena Biserova; Soviet Union	Benita Fitzgerald; United States

== Results ==
=== Heats ===
Wind:
Heat 1: +1.6 m/s, Heat 2: +1.8 m/s

Rank	Heat	Athlete	Nationality	Time	Notes
1	1	Natalya Petrova	Soviet Union	12.98	Q
2	2	Yelena Biserova	Soviet Union	13.01	Q
3	2	Candy Young	United States	13.14	Q
4	1	Benita Fitzgerald	United States	13.21	Q
5	2	Anne Piquereau	France	13.22	Q
6	1	Mihaela Stoica	Romania	13.26	Q
7	2	Susan Kameli	Canada	13.27	q
8	1	Karen Nelson	Canada	13.38	q
9	1	Patricia Rollo	Great Britain	13.42	
10	2	Grisel Machado	Cuba	13.49	
11	2	Juraciara da Silva	Brazil	13.52	NR
12	1	Karen Bowen	Jamaica	14.10	
13	1	Liu Meiling	China	14.22	
14	2	May Sardouk	Lebanon	20.51	
15	2	Ana Isabel Oliveira	Portugal	26.43	

=== Final ===
Wind: +0.1 m/s

Rank	Athlete	Nationality	Time	Notes
1st place, gold medalist(s)	Natalya Petrova	Soviet Union	13.04	
2nd place, silver medalist(s)	Yelena Biserova	Soviet Union	13.07	
3rd place, bronze medalist(s)	Benita Fitzgerald	United States	13.24	
4	Candy Young	United States	13.37	
5	Susan Kameli	Canada	13.39	
6	Mihaela Stoica	Romania	13.40	
7	Anne Piquereau	France	13.49	
8	Karen Nelson	Canada	13.62	
