= 1983 World Championships in Athletics – Women's 100 metres hurdles =

These are the official results of the Women's 100 metres Hurdles event at the 1983 IAAF World Championships in Helsinki, Finland. There were a total number of 35 participating athletes, with five qualifying heats, four quarter-finals, two semi-finals and the final held on Saturday 1983-08-13.

== Medalists ==
Gold	Bettine Jahn; East Germany (GDR)
Silver	Kerstin Knabe; East Germany (GDR)
Bronze	Ginka Zagorcheva; Bulgaria (BUL)

== Records ==
Existing records at the start of the event.

World Record	Grażyna Rabsztyn (POL)	12.36	Warsaw, Poland	June 12, 1980
Championship Record	New event			

== Final ==
RANK	FINAL wind +2.4 m/s	TIME
	Bettine Jahn (GDR)	12.35w
	Kerstin Knabe (GDR)	12.42w
	Ginka Zagorcheva (BUL)	12.62w
4.	Natalya Petrova (URS)	12.67w
5.	Shirley Strong (GBR)	12.78w
6.	Yelena Biserova (URS)	12.80w
7.	Cornelia Riefstahl (GDR)	12.94w
8.	Benita Fitzgerald (USA)	12.99w

== Semi-finals ==
- Held on Saturday 1983-08-13

RANK	HEAT 1 wind +0.7	TIME
1.	Ginka Zagorcheva (BUL)	12.75
2.	Kerstin Knabe (GDR)	12.83
3.	Yelena Biserova (URS)	12.92
4.	Shirley Strong (GBR)	12.99
5.	Michèle Chardonnet (FRA)	13.13
6.	Pam Page (USA)	13.24
7.	Heike Filsinger (FRG)	13.42
8.	Xénia Siska (HUN)	13.68

RANK	HEAT 2 wind +1.6	TIME
1.	Bettine Jahn (GDR)	12.76
2.	Natalya Petrova (URS)	12.83
3.	Benita Fitzgerald (USA)	12.96
4.	Cornelia Riefstahl (GDR)	13.00
5.	Laurence Elloy (FRA)	13.08
6.	Ulrike Denk (FRG)	13.16
7.	Judy Livermore (GBR)	13.30
8.	Glynis Nunn (AUS)	13.39

== Quarter-finals ==
- Held on Friday 1983-08-12

RANK	HEAT 1 wind +1.4	TIME
1.	Kerstin Knabe (GDR)	12.83
2.	Judy Livermore (GBR)	13.22
3.	Glynis Nunn (AUS)	13.23
4.	Heike Filsinger (FRG)	13.31
5.	Sue Kameli (CAN)	13.33
6.	Beatriz Capotosto (ARG)	13.60
7.	Elisavet Pantazi (GRE)	13.95
8.	Dai Jianhua (CHN)	14.07

RANK	HEAT 2 wind +2.3	TIME
1.	Ginka Zagorcheva (BUL)	12.66w
2.	Natalya Petrova (URS)	12.70w
3.	Pam Page (USA)	13.12w
4.	Michèle Chardonnet (FRA)	13.13w
5.	Lorna Boothe (GBR)	13.29w
6.	Heidi Benserud (NOR)	13.60w
7.	Helle Sichlau (DEN)	13.73w
	Lin Yueh-hsiang (TPE)	DNS

RANK	HEAT 3 wind +1.9	TIME
1.	Bettine Jahn (GDR)	12.75
2.	Laurence Elloy (FRA)	12.95
3.	Benita Fitzgerald (USA)	13.15
4.	Xénia Siska (HUN)	13.16
5.	Mihaela Stoica (ROU)	13.21
6.	Marjan Olyslager (NED)	13.30
7.	Sylvia Forgrave (CAN)	13.38
8.	Emi Sasaki (JPN)	13.73

RANK	HEAT 4 wind +1.6	TIME
1.	Shirley Strong (GBR)	12.91
2.	Yelena Biserova (URS)	12.94
3.	Cornelia Riefstahl (GDR)	12.96
4.	Ulrike Denk (FRG)	13.14
5.	Marie-Noëlle Savigny (FRA)	13.21
6.	Karen Nelson (CAN)	13.61
7.	María José Martínez Guerrero (ESP)	13.80
8.	Saila Purho (FIN)	13.90

== Qualifying heats ==
- Held on Friday 1983-08-12

RANK	HEAT 1 wind +0.8	TIME
1.	Kerstin Knabe (GDR)	13.03
2.	Laurence Elloy (FRA)	13.15
3.	Ulrike Denk (FRG)	13.26
4.	Sue Kameli (CAN)	13.61
5.	Heidi Benserud (NOR)	13.71
6.	Elisavet Pantazi (GRE)	13.90
7.	Dai Jianhua (CHN)	13.97

RANK	HEAT 2 wind +2.1	TIME
1.	Ginka Zagorcheva (BUL)	12.78w
2.	Yelena Biserova (URS)	12.91w
3.	Marie-Noëlle Savigny (FRA)	13.21w
4.	Mihaela Stoica (ROU)	13.24w
5.	Lorna Boothe (GBR)	13.46w
6.	Beatriz Capotosto (ARG)	13.63w
7.	Lin Yueh-hsiang (TPE)	14.25w

RANK	HEAT 3 wind -3.1	TIME
1.	Shirley Strong (GBR)	13.26
2.	Natalya Petrova (URS)	13.43
3.	Xénia Siska (HUN)	13.60
4.	Benita Fitzgerald (USA)	13.67
5.	Sylvia Forgrave (CAN)	13.83
6.	Nawal El Moutawakel (MAR)	14.85
7.	June Caddle (BAR)	14.89

RANK	HEAT 4 wind +0.5	TIME
1.	Heike Filsinger (FRG)	13.04
2.	Cornelia Riefstahl (GDR)	13.07
3.	Glynis Nunn (AUS)	13.26
4.	Karen Nelson (CAN)	13.66
5.	Helle Sichlau (DEN)	13.76
6.	Maria José Martínez-Patiño (ESP)	13.78
	Candy Young (USA)	DNF

RANK	HEAT 5 wind +0.6	TIME
1.	Bettine Jahn (GDR)	12.81
2.	Michèle Chardonnet (FRA)	13.17
3.	Pam Page (USA)	13.18
4.	Judy Livermore (GBR)	13.25
5.	Marjan Olyslager (NED)	13.26
6.	Emi Sasaki (JPN)	13.78
7.	Saila Purho (FIN)	13.90
