= 1983 European Athletics Indoor Championships – Women's 60 metres hurdles =

The women's 60 metres hurdles event at the 1983 European Athletics Indoor Championships was held on 5 March.

== Medalists ==
Gold	Silver	Bronze
Bettine Jahn; East Germany	Kerstin Knabe; East Germany	Tatyana Malyuvanyets; Soviet Union

== Results ==
=== Heats ===
First 2 from each heat (Q) and the next 2 fastest (q) qualified for the final.

Rank	Heat	Name	Nationality	Time	Notes
1	2	Bettine Jahn	East Germany	7.87	Q
2	1	Kerstin Knabe	East Germany	7.97	Q
3	2	Tatyana Malyuvanyets	Soviet Union	8.04	Q
4	1	Ginka Zagorcheva	Bulgaria	8.10	Q
5	1	Edith Oker	West Germany	8.18	q
5	2	Ulrike Denk	West Germany	8.18	q
7	1	Marie-Noëlle Savigny	France	8.22	
8	2	Michèle Chardonnet	France	8.26	
9	2	Lorna Boothe	Great Britain	8.32	
9	1	Semra Aksu	Turkey	8.66	
10	2	Andrea Csehi	Hungary	8.71	
	1	Svetlana Gusarova	Soviet Union	DNS	

=== Final ===
Rank	Lane	Name	Nationality	Time	Notes
1st place, gold medalist(s)	5	Bettine Jahn	East Germany	7.75	WB
2nd place, silver medalist(s)	3	Kerstin Knabe	East Germany	7.96	
3rd place, bronze medalist(s)	2	Tatyana Malyuvanyets	Soviet Union	8.07	
4	4	Ginka Zagorcheva	Bulgaria	8.08	
5	6	Ulrike Denk	West Germany	8.20	
6	1	Edith Oker	West Germany	8.21	
