= 1982 European Athletics Championships – Women's 100 metres hurdles =

Women's 100 metres hurdles at the European Athletics Championships

These are the official results of the Women's 100 metres hurdles event at the 1982 European Championships in Athens, Greece, held at Olympic Stadium "Spiros Louis" on 9 September 1982.

== Medalists ==
Gold	Lucyna Kałek; Poland
Silver	Yordanka Donkova; Bulgaria
Bronze	Kerstin Knabe; East Germany

== Results ==
=== Final ===
9 September Wind: 0.4 m/s

Rank	Name	Nationality	Time	Notes
1st place, gold medalist(s)	Lucyna Kałek	Poland	12.45	CR
2nd place, silver medalist(s)	Yordanka Donkova	Bulgaria	12.54	
3rd place, bronze medalist(s)	Kerstin Knabe	East Germany	12.54	
4	Bettine Gärtz	East Germany	12.55	
5	Mariya Merchuk	Soviet Union	12.85	
6	Vera Komisova	Soviet Union	12.92	
7	Tatyana Anisimova	Soviet Union	13.06	
8	Ginka Zagorcheva	Bulgaria	13.14	

=== Heats ===
9 September

==== Heat 1 ====
Wind: 1.5 m/s

Rank	Name	Nationality	Time	Notes
1	Lucyna Kałek	Poland	12.45	CR Q
2	Bettine Gärtz	East Germany	12.60	Q
3	Ginka Zagorcheva	Bulgaria	12.84	Q
4	Mariya Merchuk	Soviet Union	12.91	Q
5	Michèle Chardonnet	France	13.28	
6	Marie-Noëlle Savigny	France	13.36	
7	Hilde Fredriksen	Norway	13.55	
8	Elisavet Pantazi	Greece	13.71	

==== Heat 2 ====
Wind: 0.6 m/s

Rank	Name	Nationality	Time	Notes
1	Yordanka Donkova	Bulgaria	12.60	Q
2	Kerstin Knabe	East Germany	12.65	Q
3	Tatyana Anisimova	Soviet Union	12.90	Q
4	Vera Komisova	Soviet Union	13.00	Q
5	Laurence Elloy	France	13.07	
6	Cornelia Riefstahl	East Germany	13.07	
7	Shirley Strong	United Kingdom	13.24	
8	Ann Axelsson	Sweden	14.24	

== Participation ==
According to an unofficial count, 16 athletes from 9 countries participated in the event.

- Bulgaria (2)
- East Germany (3)
- France (3)
- Greece (1)
- Norway (1)
- Poland (1)
- Soviet Union (3)
- Sweden (1)
- United Kingdom (1)

== See also ==
- 1978 European World Championships 100m Hurdles (Prague)
- 1980 Women's Olympic 100m Hurdles (Moscow)
- 1983 Women's World Championships 100m Hurdles (Helsinki)
- 1984 Women's Olympic 100m Hurdles (Los Angeles)
- 1986 European World Championships 100m Hurdles (Stuttgart)
- 1987 Women's World Championships 100m Hurdles (Rome)
- 1988 Women's Olympic 100m Hurdles (Seoul)
