= Athletics at the 1982 Commonwealth Games – Women's 100 metres hurdles =

Women's 100 metres hurdles at the Commonwealth Games

The women's 100 metres hurdles event at the 1982 Commonwealth Games was held on 7 and 8 October at the QE II Stadium in Brisbane, Australia.

== Medalists ==
Gold	Silver	Bronze
Shirley Strong; England	Lorna Boothe; England	Sue Kameli; Canada

== Results ==
=== Heats ===
Qualification: First 4 in each heat (Q) and the next 1 fastest (q) qualify for the final.

Wind:
Heat 1: +1.6 m/s, Heat 2: +1.1 m/s

Rank	Heat	Name	Nationality	Time	Notes
1	1	Lorna Boothe	England	13.07	Q
2	2	Shirley Strong	England	13.13	Q
3	1	Karen Nelson	Canada	13.32	Q
3	2	Glynis Nunn	Australia	13.32	Q
5	1	Sylvia Malgadey-Forgrave	Canada	13.38	Q
6	2	Sue Kameli	Canada	13.42	Q
7	1	Judy Livermore	England	13.43	Q
8	2	Elaine McMaster	Scotland	13.60	Q
9	2	Maria Usifo	Nigeria	13.71	q
10	2	Jayne Beasley	Australia	13.77	
11	1	Jenny Low	Australia	13.85	
12	1	Terry Genge	New Zealand	13.86	
13	1	Ann Girvan	Scotland	13.89	
14	2	June Caddle	Barbados	13.97	
15	2	Judith Rodgers	Northern Ireland	14.52	
16	1	Sharon Coetzee	Zimbabwe	15.49	
	1	Ruth Kyalisima	Uganda	DNS	

=== Final ===
Wind: +4.5 m/s

Rank	Lane	Name	Nationality	Time	Notes
1st place, gold medalist(s)	5	Shirley Strong	England	12.78	
2nd place, silver medalist(s)	4	Lorna Boothe	England	12.90	
3rd place, bronze medalist(s)	2	Sue Kameli	Canada	13.10	
4	9	Karen Nelson	Canada	13.10	
5	7	Judy Livermore	England	13.25	
6	1	Glynis Nunn	Australia	13.31	
7	6	Sylvia Malgadey-Forgrave	Canada	13.38	
8	3	Maria Usifo	Nigeria	13.39	
9	8	Elaine McMaster	Scotland	13.57	
