= Athletics at the 1979 Summer Universiade – Women's 100 metres hurdles =

The women's 100 metres hurdles event at the 1979 Summer Universiade was held at the Estadio Olimpico Universitario in Mexico City on 9 and 10 September 1979.

== Medalists ==
Gold	Silver	Bronze
Lucyna Langer; Poland	Danuta Perka; Poland	Vera Komisova; Soviet Union

== Results ==
=== Heats ===
Wind:
Heat 1: 0.0 m/s, Heat 2: 0.0 m/s, Heat 3: 0.0 m/s

Rank	Heat	Athlete	Nationality	Time	Notes
1	3	Danuta Perka	Poland	12.65	Q, UR
2	1	Lucyna Langer	Poland	12.69	Q
3	3	Nina Margulina	Soviet Union	12.91	Q
4	2	Vera Komisova	Soviet Union	12.97	Q
5	1	Doris Baum	West Germany	13.15	Q
6	3	Mihaela Dumitrescu	Romania	13.28	q
7	3	Benita Fitzgerald	United States	13.33	q
8	3	Lidiya Gusheva	Bulgaria	13.37	
9	2	Stephanie Hightower	United States	13.42	Q
10	1	Sharon Lane	Canada	13.43	
11	2	Michèle Chardonnet	France	13.50	
12	1	Laurence Lebeau	France	13.53	
13	3	Bella Bell-Gam	Nigeria	13.88	
14	3	Susan Bradley	Canada	13.99	
15	2	Judy Bell-Gam	Nigeria	14.01	
16	1	Patrizia Lombardo	Italy	14.02	
17	2	Nancy Vallecilla	Ecuador	14.10	
18	1	Dorte Erling	Denmark	14.76	
19	3	Fatima El-Faquir	Morocco	15.24	
20	2	Willette Lalasoariravaka	Madagascar	16.21	
21	1	Mayra Figueroa	Guatemala	16.42	

=== Final ===
Wind: 0.0 m/s

Rank	Athlete	Nationality	Time	Notes
1st place, gold medalist(s)	Lucyna Langer	Poland	12.62	UR
2nd place, silver medalist(s)	Danuta Perka	Poland	12.66	
3rd place, bronze medalist(s)	Vera Komisova	Soviet Union	12.90	
4	Nina Margulina	Soviet Union	12.99	
5	Doris Baum	West Germany	13.25	
6	Stephanie Hightower	United States	13.40	
7	Mihaela Dumitrescu	Romania	13.46	
8	Benita Fitzgerald	United States	13.82	
