= Athletics at the 1983 Pan American Games – Women's 100 metres hurdles =

Women's 100 metres hurdles at the Pan American Games

The women's 100 metres hurdles event at the 1983 Pan American Games was held in Caracas, Venezuela on 25 and 26 August.

== Medalists ==
Gold	Silver	Bronze
Benita Fitzgerald; United States	Kim Turner; United States	Elida Aveillé; Cuba

== Results ==
=== Heats ===
Wind:
Heat 1: +0.1 m/s, Heat 1: -0.5 m/s

Rank	Heat	Name	Nationality	Time	Notes
1	1	Sue Kameli	Canada	13.11	Q
2	1	Elida Aveillé	Cuba	13.17	Q
3	2	Kim Turner	United States	13.18	Q
4	1	Benita Fitzgerald	United States	13.21	Q
5	2	Grisel Machado	Cuba	13.22	Q
6	2	Karen Nelson	Canada	13.30	Q
7	2	Juraciara da Silva	Brazil	13.70	Q
8	1	Beatriz Capotosto	Argentina	13.77	q
9	2	Marie Regis	Venezuela	14.47	

=== Final ===
Wind: -0.9 m/s

Rank	Name	Nationality	Time	Notes
1st place, gold medalist(s)	Benita Fitzgerald	United States	13.16	
2nd place, silver medalist(s)	Kim Turner	United States	13.39	
3rd place, bronze medalist(s)	Elida Aveillé	Cuba	13.41	
4	Grisel Machado	Cuba	13.41	
5	Sue Kameli	Canada	13.45	
6	Karen Nelson	Canada	13.67	
7	Beatriz Capotosto	Argentina	13.74	
8	Juraciara da Silva	Brazil	14.05	
