= 1982 European Athletics Indoor Championships – Women's 60 metres hurdles =

The women's 60 metres hurdles event at the 1982 European Athletics Indoor Championships was held on 6 March.

== Medalists ==
Gold	Silver	Bronze
Kerstin Knabe; East Germany	Bettine Gärtz; East Germany	Yordanka Donkova; Bulgaria

== Results ==
=== Heats ===
First 3 from each heat (Q) and the next 3 fastest (q) qualified for the semifinals.

Rank	Heat	Name	Nationality	Time	Notes
1	1	Kerstin Knabe	East Germany	8.09	Q
2	1	Yelena Biserova	Soviet Union	8.11	Q
2	3	Yordanka Donkova	Bulgaria	8.11	Q
4	2	Bettine Gärtz	East Germany	8.14	Q
4	3	Natalya Petrova	Soviet Union	8.14	Q
6	2	Mariya Merchuk	Soviet Union	8.15	Q
7	2	Grażyna Rabsztyn	Poland	8.16	Q
8	3	Sabine Everts	West Germany	8.18	Q
9	3	Lucyna Langer	Poland	8.20	q
10	1	Marie-Noëlle Savigny	France	8.23	Q
11	1	Xénia Siska	Hungary	8.23	q
12	3	Michèle Chardonnet	France	8.24	q
13	2	Laurence Monclar	France	8.24	
14	2	Laura Rosati	Italy	8.50	
15	1	Petra Prenner	Austria	8.65	

=== Semifinals ===
First 3 from each semifinal qualified directly (Q) for the final.

Rank	Heat	Name	Nationality	Time	Notes
1	2	Bettine Gärtz	East Germany	7.99	Q
2	1	Kerstin Knabe	East Germany	8.01	Q
3	2	Grażyna Rabsztyn	Poland	8.03	Q
4	1	Yordanka Donkova	Bulgaria	8.07	Q
4	2	Mariya Merchuk	Soviet Union	8.07	Q, NR
6	1	Natalya Petrova	Soviet Union	8.09	Q
7	2	Yelena Biserova	Soviet Union	8.10	
8	1	Lucyna Langer	Poland	8.13	
9	1	Marie-Noëlle Savigny	France	8.15	
10	2	Michèle Chardonnet	France	8.17	
11	1	Sabine Everts	West Germany	8.18	
11	2	Xénia Siska	Hungary	8.18	

=== Final ===
Rank	Name	Nationality	Time	Notes
1st place, gold medalist(s)	Kerstin Knabe	East Germany	7.98	
2nd place, silver medalist(s)	Bettine Gärtz	East Germany	8.00	
3rd place, bronze medalist(s)	Yordanka Donkova	Bulgaria	8.09	
4	Natalya Petrova	Soviet Union	8.16	
5	Grażyna Rabsztyn	Poland	8.21	
6	Mariya Merchuk	Soviet Union	8.64	
