= Athletics at the 1980 Summer Olympics – Women's 100 metres hurdles =

Women's 100 metres hurdles at the Games of the XXII Olympiad
- Venue: Lenin Central Stadium
- Dates: 27 July 1980 (heats); 28 July 1980 (semi-finals and finals)
- Competitors: 22 from 14 nations
- Winning time: 12.56 OR

Medalists
1st place, gold medalist(s)		Vera Komisova; Soviet Union
2nd place, silver medalist(s)		Johanna Klier; East Germany
3rd place, bronze medalist(s)		Lucyna Langer; Poland

The women's 100 metres hurdles at the 1980 Summer Olympics in Moscow, Soviet Union had an entry list of 22 competitors, with three qualifying heats (22 runners), two semi-finals (16) before the final (8) took place on Monday 28 July 1980.

== Final ==
Rank	Athlete	Nation	Time	Notes
1st place, gold medalist(s)	Vera Komisova	Soviet Union	12.56	
2nd place, silver medalist(s)	Johanna Klier	East Germany	12.63	
3rd place, bronze medalist(s)	Lucyna Langer	Poland	12.65	
4	Kerstin Knabe	East Germany	12.66	
5	Grażyna Rabsztyn	Poland	12.74	
6	Irina Litovchenko	Soviet Union	12.84	
7	Bettine Gärtz	East Germany	12.93	
8	Zofia Bielczyk	Poland	13.08	

== Semi finals ==
- Held on Monday 28 July 1980

Rank	Athlete	Nation	Time	Notes
1	Vera Komisova	Soviet Union	12.78	
2	Lucyna Langer	Poland	12.91	
3	Bettine Gärtz	East Germany	13.04	
4	Zofia Bielczyk	Poland	13.09	
5	Laurence Elloy	France	13.33	
6	Yordanka Donkova	Bulgaria	13.39	
7	Laurence Le Beau	France	13.54	
8	Helena Pihl	Sweden	13.68	

Rank	Athlete	Nation	Time	Notes
1	Grażyna Rabsztyn	Poland	12.64	
2	Johanna Klier	East Germany	12.77	
3	Irina Litovchenko	Soviet Union	12.84	
4	Kerstin Knabe	East Germany	12.99	
5	Shirley Strong	Great Britain	13.12	
6	Daniela Valkova	Bulgaria	13.79	
–	Xenia Siska	Hungary	DNF	
–	Tatyana Anisimova	Soviet Union	DNS	

== Heats ==
- Held on Sunday 27 July 1980

Rank	Athlete	Nation	Time	Notes
1	Vera Komisova	Soviet Union	12.67	
2	Lucyna Langer	Poland	12.75	
3	Kerstin Knabe	East Germany	12.77	
4	Laurence Le Beau	France	13.18	
5	Xenia Siska	Hungary	13.23	
6	Yordanka Donkova	Bulgaria	13.24	
7	Marisela Peralta	Dominican Republic	14.18	

Rank	Athlete	Nation	Time	Notes
1	Grażyna Rabsztyn	Poland	12.72	
2	Johanna Klier	East Germany	13.03	
3	Tatyana Anisimova	Soviet Union	13.31	
4	Helena Pihl	Sweden	13.46	
5	Laurence Elloy	France	13.60	
6	Lorna Boothe	Great Britain	13.86	
7	Estella Meheux	Sierra Leone	15.61	

Rank	Athlete	Nation	Time	Notes
1	Irina Litovchenko	Soviet Union	12.97	
2	Bettine Gärtz	East Germany	13.06	
3	Zofia Bielczyk	Poland	13.21	
4	Shirley Strong	Great Britain	13.39	
5	Daniela Valkova	Bulgaria	13.66	
6	Penny Gillies	Australia	13.68	
—	Yvonne Von Kauffungen	Switzerland	DNS	
—	Nancy Vallecilla	Ecuador	DNS	

== See also ==
- 1976 Women's Olympic 100m Hurdles (Montreal)
- 1978 European Championships 100m Hurdles (Prague)
- 1982 European Championships 100m Hurdles (Athens)
- 1983 Women's World Championships 100m Hurdles (Helsinki)
- 1984 Women's Olympic 100m Hurdles (Los Angeles)
