= Athletics at the 1984 Summer Olympics – Women's 100 metres hurdles =

Women's 100 metres hurdles at the Games of the XXIII Olympiad
- Venue: Los Angeles Memorial Coliseum
- Dates: 9 August 1984 (heats); 10 August 1984 (semi-finals and finals)
- Competitors: 22 from 14 nations
- Winning time: 12.84

Medalists
1st place, gold medalist(s)		Benita Fitzgerald-Brown; United States
2nd place, silver medalist(s)		Shirley Strong; Great Britain
3rd place, bronze medalist(s)		Kim Turner; United States
3rd place, bronze medalist(s)		Michèle Chardonnet; France

These are the official results of the Women's 100 metres hurdles event at the 1984 Summer Olympics in Los Angeles, California. The final was held on August 10, 1984.

== Medalists ==
Gold	Benita Fitzgerald-Brown; United States
Silver	Shirley Strong; Great Britain
Bronze	Kim Turner; United States
Bronze	Michèle Chardonnet; France

== Records ==
These were the standing World and Olympic records (in seconds) prior to the 1984 Summer Olympics.

World record	12.36	(Poland) Grażyna Rabsztyn	Warsaw (POL)	June 12, 1980
Olympic record	12.56	(Soviet Union) Vera Komisova	Moscow (URS)	July 28, 1980

== Final ==
Held on August 10, 1984

Rank	Athlete	Nation	Time	Notes
1st place, gold medalist(s)	Benita Fitzgerald-Brown	United States	12.84	
2nd place, silver medalist(s)	Shirley Strong	Great Britain	12.88	
3rd place, bronze medalist(s)	Kim Turner	United States	13.06	
3rd place, bronze medalist(s)	Michèle Chardonnet	France	13.06	
5	Glynis Nunn	Australia	13.20	
6	Marie-Noëlle Savigny	France	13.28	
7	Ulrike Denk	West Germany	13.32	
8	Pam Page	United States	13.40	

== Semifinals ==
- Held on August 10, 1984

Rank	Athlete	Nation	Time	Notes
1	Kim Turner	United States	13.11	
2	Shirley Strong	Great Britain	13.16	
3	Marie-Noëlle Savigny	France	13.30	
4	Pam Page	United States	13.36	
5	Edith Oker	West Germany	13.37	
6	Sylvia Malgadey-Forgrave	Canada	13.42	
7	Cécile Ngambi	Cameroon	13.70	
8	Sophia Hunter	Jamaica	13.84	

Rank	Athlete	Nation	Time	Notes
1	Benita Fitzgerald-Brown	United States	12.98	
2	Michèle Chardonnet	France	13.09	
3	Glynis Nunn	Australia	13.14	
4	Ulrike Denk	West Germany	13.20	
5	Sharon Danville	Great Britain	13.35	
6	Maria Usifo	Nigeria	13.52	
7	Liu Huajin	China	13.57	
8	Sue Bradley-Kameli	Canada	13.65	

== Round one ==
- Held on August 9, 1984

Rank	Athlete	Nation	Time	Notes
1	Benita Fitzgerald-Brown	United States	13.13	
2	Michèle Chardonnet	France	13.46	
3	Sharon Danville	Great Britain	13.46	
4	Cécile Ngambi	Cameroon	13.54	
5	Karen Nelson	Canada	13.77	
6	Barbara Ingiro	Papua New Guinea	15.39	

Rank	Athlete	Nation	Time	Notes
1	Shirley Strong	Great Britain	12.86w	
2	Edith Oker	West Germany	13.14w	
3	Glynis Nunn	Australia	13.29w	
4	Sophia Hunter	Jamaica	13.44w	
5	Liu Huajin	China	13.64w	
6	Elissavet Pantazi	Greece	14.20w	

Rank	Athlete	Nation	Time	Notes
1	Ulrike Denk	West Germany	13.32	
2	Kim Turner	United States	13.33	
3	Marie-Noëlle Savigny	France	13.36	
4	Sylvia Malgadey-Forgrave	Canada	13.47	
5	Semra Aksu	Turkey	13.96	

Rank	Athlete	Nation	Time	Notes
1	Pam Page	United States	13.32	
2	Maria Usifo	Nigeria	13.54	
3	Sue Bradley-Kameli	Canada	13.72	
4	Beatriz Capotosto	Argentina	13.90	
5	Laurence Elloy-Machabey	France	13.98	

== See also ==
- 1982 Women's European Championships 100 metres hurdles (Athens)
- 1983 Women's World Championships 100 metres hurdles (Helsinki)
- 1984 Friendship Games 100 metres hurdles (Prague)
- 1985 Women's World Championships 100 metres hurdles (Rome)
