= Athletics at the 1981 Summer Universiade – Women's 100 metres hurdles =

The women's 100 metres hurdles event at the 1981 Summer Universiade was held at the Stadionul Naţional in Bucharest on 23 and 24 July 1981.

== Medalists ==
Gold	Silver	Bronze
Stephanie Hightower; United States	Mariya Kemenchezhiy; Soviet Union	Elżbieta Rabsztyn; Poland

== Results ==
=== Heats ===
Wind:
Heat 1: +0.2 m/s, Heat 2: +0.3 m/s, Heat 3: +0.4 m/s

Rank	Heat	Athlete	Nationality	Time	Notes
1	2	Mariya Kemenchezhiy	Soviet Union	12.97	Q
2	2	Laurence Elloy	France	13.19	Q
3	2	Benita Fitzgerald	United States	13.20	q
4	1	Natalya Petrova	Soviet Union	13.22	Q
5	3	Stephanie Hightower	United States	13.29	Q
6	1	Michèle Chardonnet	France	13.34	Q
7	1	Elżbieta Rabsztyn	Poland	13.37	q
8	3	Doris Baum	West Germany	13.41	Q
9	3	Mihaela Pogăcean	Romania	13.45	
10	1	Patrizia Lombardo	Italy	13.62	
11	3	Ildikó Baranyai	Hungary	13.70	
12	2	Dagmar Schenten	West Germany	13.74	
13	1	Ilona Dumitrascu	Romania	13.78	
14	3	Juraciara da Silva	Brazil	13.79	
15	1	Petra Prenner	Austria	13.98	
16	2	Gabriella Pizzolato	Italy	14.03	
17	3	Zhou Ying	China	14.25	
18	2	Elida Aveillé	Cuba	14.31	

=== Final ===
Wind: -0.6 m/s

Rank	Athlete	Nationality	Time	Notes
1st place, gold medalist(s)	Stephanie Hightower	United States	13.03	
2nd place, silver medalist(s)	Mariya Kemenchezhiy	Soviet Union	13.13	
3rd place, bronze medalist(s)	Elżbieta Rabsztyn	Poland	13.31	
4	Natalya Petrova	Soviet Union	13.33	
5	Michèle Chardonnet	France	13.46	
6	Benita Fitzgerald	United States	13.47	
7	Laurence Elloy	France	13.54	
8	Doris Baum	West Germany	13.81	
