= Athletics at the 1978 Commonwealth Games – Women's 100 metres hurdles =

Women's 100 metres hurdles at the Commonwealth Games

The women's 100 metres hurdles event at the 1978 Commonwealth Games was held on 10 and 11 August at the Commonwealth Stadium in Edmonton, Alberta, Canada.

== Medalists ==
Gold	Silver	Bronze
Lorna Boothe; England	Shirley Strong; England	Sharon Colyear; England

== Results ==
=== Heats ===
Held on 10 August

Qualification: First 3 in each heat (Q) and the next 2 fastest (q) qualify for the final.

Wind:
Heat 1: ? m/s, Heat 2: -0.2 m/s

Rank	Heat	Name	Nationality	Time	Notes
1	2	Sharon Colyear	England	13.34	Q
2	2	Shirley Strong	England	13.41	Q
3	1	Lorna Boothe	England	13.49	Q
4	1	Sharon Lane	Canada	13.89	Q
5	2	Diane Jones-Konihowski	Canada	14.00	Q
6	1	Elaine Davidson	Scotland	14.03	Q
7	1	Gail Wooten	New Zealand	14.14	q
8	2	June Caddle	Barbados	14.22	q
9	2	Roxanne Gelle	Australia	14.23	
10	2	Marina Chin Leng Sim	Malaysia	14.77	
11	1	Vicky Hancox	Northern Ireland	15.12	
12	2	Teresa David	Mauritius	16.13	
	1	Bernadine Lewis	Grenada	DNS	
	1	Glynis Saunders	Australia	DNS	

=== Final ===
Held on 11 August

Wind: +3.6 m/s

Rank	Name	Nationality	Time	Notes
1st place, gold medalist(s)	Lorna Boothe	England	12.98	
2nd place, silver medalist(s)	Shirley Strong	England	13.08	
3rd place, bronze medalist(s)	Sharon Colyear	England	13.17	
4	Elaine Davidson	Scotland	13.76	
5	Gail Wooten	New Zealand	13.77	
6	Sharon Lane	Canada	13.88	
7	Diane Jones-Konihowski	Canada	14.11	
8	June Caddle	Barbados	14.13	
