= 1984 United States Olympic trials (track and field) =

- Dates: June 16–June 24
- Host city: Los Angeles, California, United States
- Venue: Los Angeles Memorial Coliseum
- Level: Senior
- Type: Outdoor

The 1984 United States Olympic trials for track and field were held at Los Angeles Memorial Coliseum in Los Angeles, California, the same venue as would host the 1984 Olympics a month and a half later. Organised by The Athletics Congress (TAC), the nine-day competition lasted from June 16 until June 24. The national championships in track and field for the United States was a separate event that year, held a week earlier in San Jose, California. The women's marathon Olympic trials were held on May 12 in Olympia, Washington. The men's marathon trials were in Buffalo, New York on May 26.

The results of the event determined qualification for the United States at the 1984 Summer Olympics.

This meet had two of the closest finishes. In the women's 100 meters hurdles, the second, third and fourth-place finishers had the same time to the 100th of a second, with winner Kim Turner just one 100th ahead. Stephanie Hightower was the odd person out, not selected to the Olympic team. 28 years later at the 2012 trials, Hightower as President of USATF had to administer over another similar tie in the women's 100 meters between Allyson Felix and Jeneba Tarmoh that could not be separated by photo finish pictures. The other close finish was in the men's 800 meters, where Earl Jones and Johnny Gray both received the same time of 1:43.74 to share the American Record from the same race. And .17 behind them John Marshall and James Robinson also received the same time for the last qualifying place after Robinson kicked past the field and looked to have edged past Marshall, Robinson relaxed at the line while Marshall made one last lean to get the edge and take the final spot on the Olympic team.

== 1984 U.S. Olympic track and field trials results ==
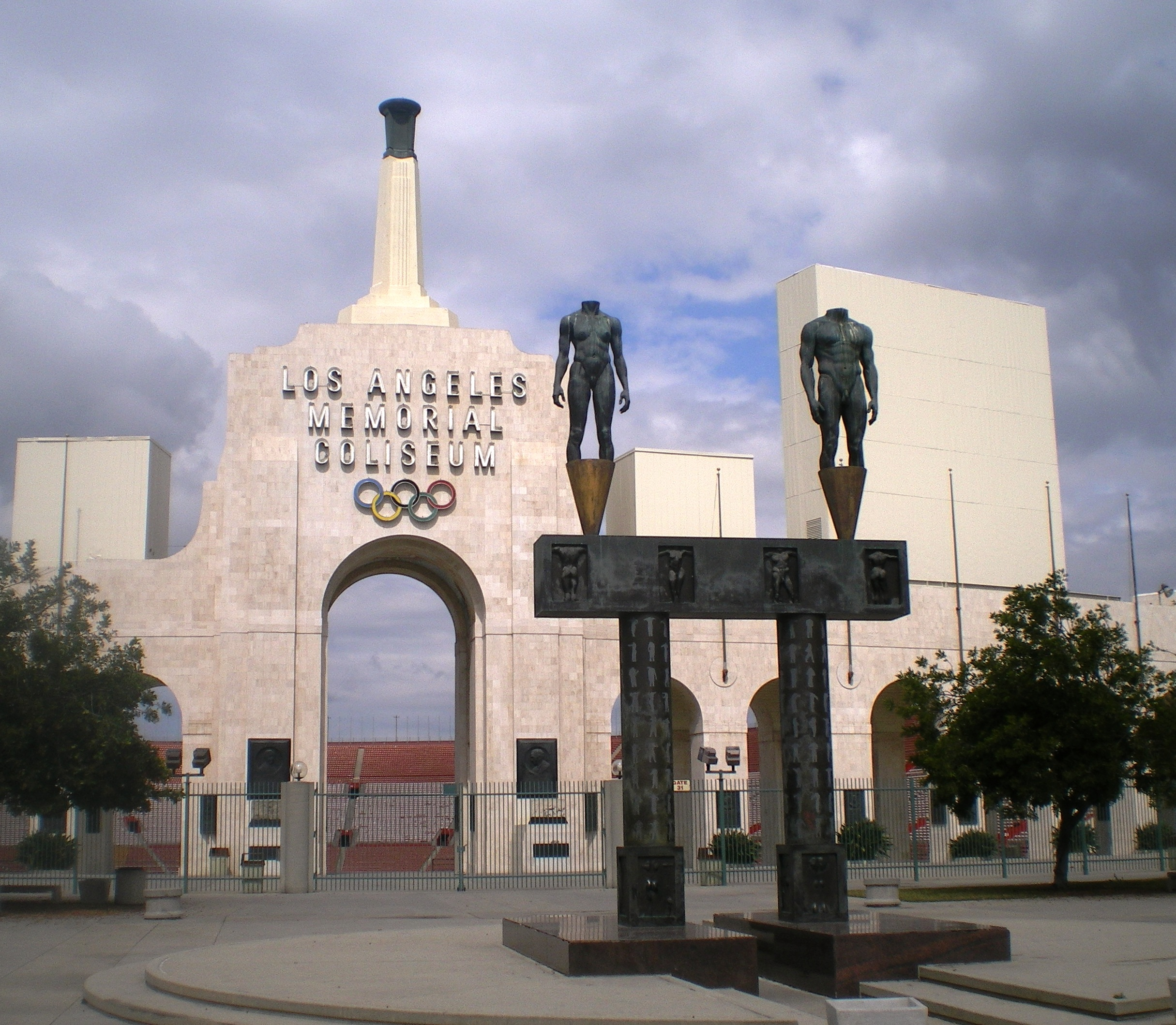
Entrance to the Los Angeles Memorial Coliseum

1984 U.S. Olympic track and field trials results

=== Men ===
Key: ≠ Athlete without "A" standard, not selected.

==== Men track events ====
Event	Gold		Silver		Bronze	
100 meters Wind -2.2	Carl Lewis	10.06	Sam Graddy	10.21	Ron Brown	10.23
200 meters	Carl Lewis	19.86	Kirk Baptiste	20.05	Thomas Jefferson	20.37
400 meters	Antonio McKay	44.71	Alonzo Babers	44.86	Sunder Nix	45.15
800 meters	Earl Jones	1:43.74 NR	Johnny Gray	1:43.74	John Marshall	1:43.91
1500 meters	Jim Spivey	3:36.43	Steve Scott	3:36.76	Sydney Maree	3:37.02
5000 meters	Doug Padilla	13:26.34	Steve Lacy	13:27.72	Don Clary	13:28.62
10,000 meters	Paul Cummings	27:59.08	Craig Virgin	28:02.27	Pat Porter	28:03.86
110 meters hurdles Wind -1.1	Greg Foster	13.21	Tonie Campbell	13.34	Roger Kingdom	13.36
400 meters hurdles	Edwin Moses	47.76	Danny Harris	48.11	Tranel Hawkins	48.28
3000 m s'chase	Henry Marsh	8:15.91	Brian Diemer	8:17.00	John Gregorek	8:18.45
20K racewalk	Marco Evoniuk	1:26:17	Jim Heiring	1:27:18	Dan O'Connor	1:29:12
50K racewalk	Marco Evoniuk	4:02:25	Vince O'Sullivan	4:14:04	Carl Schueler	4:15:06
Marathon	Pete Pfitzinger	2:11:43	Alberto Salazar	2:11:44	John Tuttle	2:11:50

==== Men field events ====
Event	Gold		Silver		Bronze	
High jump	Dwight Stones	2.34 m (7 ft 8 in)	Doug Nordquist	2.31 m (7 ft 6 3/4 in)	Milton Goode	2.28 m (7 ft 5 3/4 in)
Pole vault	Mike Tully	5.81 m (19 ft 1/2 in) NR	Doug Lytle	5.71 m (18 ft 8 3/4 in)	Earl Bell	5.61 m (18 ft 4 3/4 in)
Long jump	Carl Lewis	8.71 m (28 ft 6 3/4 in) +0.1	Larry Myricks	8.25 m (27 ft 3/4 in)w +0.8	Mike McRae	8.15 m (26 ft 8 3/4 in) +0.7
Triple jump	Mike Conley	17.50 m (57 ft 4 3/4 in) -0.5	Al Joyner	17.19 m (56 ft 4 3/4 in) -0.8	Willie Banks	17.14 m (56 ft 2 3/4 in) *2.0
Shot put	Dave Laut	21.35 m (70 ft 1/2 in)	Augie Wolf	21.24 m (69 ft 8 in)	Michael Carter	20.84 m (68 ft 4 1/4 in)
Discus throw	John Powell	67.14 m (220 ft 3 in)	Mac Wilkins	66.14 m (216 ft 11 in)	Art Burns	65.54 m (215 ft 0 in)
Hammer throw	Bill Green	73.24 m (240 ft 3 in)	Jud Logan	72.48 m (237 ft 9 in)	Ed Burke	71.82 m (235 ft 7 in)
Javelin throw	Duncan Atwood	93.44 m (306 ft 6 in)	Tom Petranoff	84.94 m (278 ft 8 in)	Steve Roller	83.00 m (272 ft 3 in)
Decathlon	John Crist	8102	Tim Bright	8098	Jim Wooding	8072

=== Women ===
==== Women track events ====
Event	Gold		Silver		Bronze	
100 meters Wind -0.6	Evelyn Ashford	11.18	Alice Brown	11.20	Jeanette Bolden	11.24
200 meters Wind -0.2	Valerie Brisco-Hooks	22.16	Florence Griffith	22.40	Randy Givens	22.59
400 meters	Chandra Cheeseborough	49.28 NR	Valerie Brisco-Hooks	49.79	Lillie Leatherwood	50.19
800 meters	Kim Gallagher	1:58.50	Ruth Wysocki	1:59.34	Robin Campbell	1:59.77
1500 meters	Ruth Wysocki	4:00.18	Mary Decker	4:00.40	Diana Richburg	4:04.07
3000 meters	Mary Decker	8:34.91	Cindy Bremser	8:41.19	Joan Hansen	8:41.43
5000 meters	Julie Brown	15:39.50				
10,000 meters	Joan Benoit	32:07.41				
100 m hurdles Wind -0.9	Kim Turner	13.12	Benita Fitzgerald	13.13	Pam Page	13.13
400 m hurdles	Judi Brown	54.93 NR	Augie Wright	55.33	Sharrieffa Barksdale	55.50
10 km walk	Esther Lopez	50:41.18				
Marathon	Joan Benoit	2:31:04	Julie Brown	2:31:41	Julie Isphording	2:32:26

==== Women field events ====
Event	Gold		Silver		Bronze	
High jump	Louise Ritter	1.92 m (6 ft 3 1/2 in)	Pam Spencer	1.89 m (6 ft 2 1/4 in)	Joni Huntley	1.89 m (6 ft 2 1/4 in)
Long jump	Carol Lewis	6.89 m (22 ft 7 1/4 in) +0.3	Jackie Joyner	6.65 m (21 ft 9 3/4 in) -0.5	Angela Thacker	6.56 m (21 ft 6 1/4 in) -0.5
Shot put	Lorna Griffin	17.10 m (56 ft 1 in)	Carol Cady	16.96 m (55 ft 7 1/2 in)	Ramona Pagel	16.95 m (55 ft 7 1/4 in)
Discus throw	Leslie Deniz	61.76 m (202 ft 7 in)	Laura DeSnoo	58.08 m (190 ft 6 in)	Lorna Griffin	57.36 m (188 ft 2 in)
Javelin throw	Karin Smith	61.18 m (200 ft 8 in)	Lynda Sutfin	58.08 m (190 ft 6 in)	Cathy Sulinski	55.64 m (182 ft 6 in)
Heptathlon	Jackie Joyner	6520 NR	Jodi Anderson	6413	Cindy Greiner	6204
