= 1981 European Athletics Indoor Championships – Women's 50 metres hurdles =

The women's 50 metres hurdles event at the 1981 European Athletics Indoor Championships was held on 21 February.

== Medalists ==
Gold	Silver	Bronze
Zofia Bielczyk; Poland	Mariya Kemenchezhi; Soviet Union	Tatyana Anisimova; Soviet Union

== Results ==
=== Heats ===
First 3 from each heat (Q) and the next 3 fastest (q) qualified for the semifinals.

Rank	Heat	Name	Nationality	Time	Notes
1	2	Mariya Kemenchezhi	Soviet Union	6.83	Q, CR
2	1	Lidiya Gusheva	Bulgaria	6.85	Q
3	1	Elżbieta Rabsztyn	Poland	6.93	Q
3	1	Xénia Siska	Hungary	6.93	Q
3	2	Sylvia Kempin	East Germany	6.93	Q
6	3	Tatyana Anisimova	Soviet Union	6.95	Q
7	3	Zofia Bielczyk	Poland	6.96	Q
8	3	Edith Oker	West Germany	6.97	Q
9	3	Laurence Monclar	France	7.02	q
10	1	Michèle Chardonnet	France	7.03	q
11	2	Emilya Kunova	Bulgaria	7.05	Q
12	3	Yvette Wray	Great Britain	7.15	q
13	2	María José Martínez	Spain	7.19	
14	1	Helle Sichlau	Denmark	7.29	
15	1	Petra Prenner	Austria	7.35	
16	2	Lisbeth Nissen Pedersen	Denmark	7.68	
	2	Laurence Elloy	France	DNF	
	3	Dorthe Rasmussen	Denmark	DNS	

=== Semifinals ===
First 3 from each semifinal qualified directly (Q) for the final.

Rank	Heat	Name	Nationality	Time	Notes
1	1	Sylvia Kempin	East Germany	6.83	Q, =CR
2	2	Zofia Bielczyk	Poland	6.84	Q
3	2	Mariya Kemenchezhi	Soviet Union	6.86	Q
4	1	Tatyana Anisimova	Soviet Union	6.89	Q
4	1	Lidiya Gusheva	Bulgaria	6.89	Q
4	2	Xénia Siska	Hungary	6.89	Q
7	1	Elżbieta Rabsztyn	Poland	6.90	
8	1	Michèle Chardonnet	France	6.98	
9	2	Laurence Monclar	France	7.01	
10	1	Yvette Wray	Great Britain	7.03	
11	2	Emilya Kunova	Bulgaria	7.10	
	2	Edith Oker	West Germany	DNF	

=== Final ===
Rank	Name	Nationality	Time	Notes
1st place, gold medalist(s)	Zofia Bielczyk	Poland	6.74	=WR, CR
2nd place, silver medalist(s)	Mariya Kemenchezhi	Soviet Union	6.80	
3rd place, bronze medalist(s)	Tatyana Anisimova	Soviet Union	6.81	
4	Sylvia Kempin	East Germany	6.84	
5	Lidiya Gusheva	Bulgaria	6.89	
6	Xénia Siska	Hungary	7.02	
