= 1980 European Athletics Indoor Championships – Women's 60 metres hurdles =

The women's 60 metres hurdles event at the 1980 European Athletics Indoor Championships was held on 1 March in Sindelfingen.

== Medalists ==
Gold	Silver	Bronze
Zofia Bielczyk; Poland	Grażyna Rabsztyn; Poland	Natalya Lebedeva; Soviet Union

== Results ==
=== Heats ===
First 3 from each heat (Q) and the next 3 fastest (q) qualified for the semifinals.

Rank	Heat	Name	Nationality	Time	Notes
1	2	Grażyna Rabsztyn	Poland	7.98	Q
2	3	Zofia Bielczyk	Poland	8.04	Q
3	2	Natalya Lebedeva	Soviet Union	8.06	Q
4	2	Lidiya Gusheva	Bulgaria	8.10	Q
5	1	Vera Komisova	Soviet Union	8.11	Q
6	1	Elżbieta Rabsztyn	Poland	8.14	Q
7	2	Sylvia Kempin	West Germany	8.26	q
8	3	Nina Morgulina	Soviet Union	8.27	Q
9	1	Andrea Manke	West Germany	8.29	Q
10	3	Doris Baum	West Germany	8.40	Q
11	1	Helena Pihl	Sweden	8.39	q
12	1	Patrizia Lombardo	Italy	8.41	q
13	2	Lena Spoof	Finland	8.48	
13	3	Anne-Maria Pira	Belgium	8.48	

=== Semifinals ===
First 3 from each semifinal qualified directly (Q) for the final.

Rank	Heat	Name	Nationality	Time	Notes
1	2	Zofia Bielczyk	Poland	7.86	Q, CR
2	1	Grażyna Rabsztyn	Poland	7.94	Q
3	1	Vera Komisova	Soviet Union	8.00	Q
4	2	Natalya Lebedeva	Soviet Union	8.02	Q
5	2	Elżbieta Rabsztyn	Poland	8.03	Q
6	1	Nina Morgulina	Soviet Union	8.05	Q
7	1	Lidiya Gusheva	Bulgaria	8.05	
8	2	Sylvia Kempin	West Germany	8.17	
9	2	Helena Pihl	Sweden	8.30	
10	2	Doris Baum	West Germany	8.31	
11	1	Andrea Manke	West Germany	8.34	
12	1	Patrizia Lombardo	Italy	8.43	

=== Final ===
Rank	Lane	Name	Nationality	Time	Notes
1st place, gold medalist(s)	4	Zofia Bielczyk	Poland	7.77	WR, CR
2nd place, silver medalist(s)	5	Grażyna Rabsztyn	Poland	7.89	
3rd place, bronze medalist(s)	2	Natalya Lebedeva	Soviet Union	8.04	
4	1	Elżbieta Rabsztyn	Poland	8.05	
5	6	Vera Komisova	Soviet Union	8.07	
6	3	Nina Morgulina	Soviet Union	8.14	
