= 1978 European Athletics Indoor Championships – Women's 60 metres hurdles =

The women's 60 metres hurdles event at the 1978 European Athletics Indoor Championships was held on 11 March in Milan.

== Medalists ==
Gold	Silver	Bronze
Johanna Klier; East Germany	Grażyna Rabsztyn; Poland	Silvia Kempin; West Germany

== Results ==
=== Heats ===
First 2 from each heat (Q) and the next 6 fastest (q) qualified for the semifinals.

Rank	Heat	Name	Nationality	Time	Notes
1	2	Johanna Klier	East Germany	8.06	Q
2	1	Silvia Kempin	West Germany	8.11	Q
3	3	Grażyna Rabsztyn	Poland	8.12	Q
4	1	Tatyana Anisimova	Soviet Union	8.15	Q
5	1	Elżbieta Rabsztyn	Poland	8.21	q
6	1	Lidiya Gusheva	Bulgaria	8.24	q
7	2	Zofia Bielczyk	Poland	8.29	Q
7	3	Lorna Boothe	Great Britain	8.29	Q
9	2	Ileana Ongar	Italy	8.42	q
10	2	Ursula Schalück	West Germany	8.51	q
11	3	Lyubov Nikitenko	Soviet Union	8.55	q
12	3	Patrizia Lombardo	Italy	8.64	q
13	1	Ingunn Einarsdóttir	Iceland	9.03	

=== Semifinals ===
First 3 from each heat (Q) qualified directly for the final.

Rank	Heat	Name	Nationality	Time	Notes
1	2	Grażyna Rabsztyn	Poland	8.00	Q
2	1	Johanna Klier	East Germany	8.05	Q
3	2	Silvia Kempin	West Germany	8.06	Q
4	1	Tatyana Anisimova	Soviet Union	8.17	Q
5	1	Zofia Bielczyk	Poland	8.20	Q
6	2	Lidiya Gusheva	Bulgaria	8.21	Q
7	1	Elżbieta Rabsztyn	Poland	8.22	
8	2	Lorna Boothe	Great Britain	8.32	
9	1	Ursula Schalück	West Germany	8.35	
10	2	Lyubov Nikitenko	Soviet Union	8.42	
11	1	Patrizia Lombardo	Italy	8.54	
	2	Ileana Ongar	Italy	DNS	

=== Final ===
Rank	Lane	Name	Nationality	Time	Notes
1st place, gold medalist(s)	4	Johanna Klier	East Germany	7.94	CR
2nd place, silver medalist(s)	1	Grażyna Rabsztyn	Poland	8.07	
3rd place, bronze medalist(s)	2	Silvia Kempin	West Germany	8.15	
4	3	Tatyana Anisimova	Soviet Union	8.17	
5	6	Zofia Bielczyk	Poland	8.26	
6	5	Lidiya Gusheva	Bulgaria	8.32	
