= Athletics at the 1979 Pan American Games – Women's 100 metres hurdles =

Women's 100 metres hurdles at the 1979 Pan American Games
- Venue: Estadio Sixto Escobar
- Dates: 12 & 13 July
- Winning time: 12.90

Medalists
Gold medal	Deby LaPlante	United States
Silver medal	Sharon Lane	Canada
Bronze medal	Grisel Machado	Cuba

The women's 100 metres hurdles sprint competition of the athletics events at the 1979 Pan American Games took place at the Estadio Sixto Escobar. The defending Pan American Games champion was Edith Noeding of Peru.

== Records ==
Prior to this competition, the existing world and Pan American Games records were as follows:

World record	Grażyna Rabsztyn (POL)	12.48	Fürth, West Germany	June 10, 1978
Pan American Games record	Patty Johnson (USA)	13.1	Cali, Colombia	1971

== Results ==
All times are in seconds. Deby LaPlante's winning time of 12.90 seconds in the final was not registered as a Pan American record because of wind conditions.

KEY:	WR	World Record	GR	Pan American Record

=== Heats ===
Wind:
Heat 1: +3.4 m/s, Heat 2: +2.8 m/s

Rank	Heat	Name	Nationality	Time	Notes
1	1	Deby LaPlante	United States	12.97	Q
2	1	Sharon Lane	Canada	13.64	Q
3	2	Cecilia Branch	Canada	13.73	Q
4	2	Candy Young	United States	13.74	Q
5	1	Nancy Vallecilla	Ecuador	13.98	Q
6	2	Grisel Machado	Cuba	14.13	Q
7	1	María Larrazábal	Cuba	14.27	q
8	1	Beatriz Capotosto	Argentina	14.34	q
9	2	Yvonne Neddermann	Argentina	14.44	
10	1	Olga Verissimo	Brazil	14.47	
11	1	June Caddle	Barbados	14.63	
12	2	María Ángeles Cato	Mexico	14.66	
13	2	Marisela Peralta	Dominican Republic	14.72	

=== Final ===
Wind: +3.9 m/s

Rank	Name	Nationality	Time	Notes
1st place, gold medalist(s)	Deby LaPlante	United States	12.90	
2nd place, silver medalist(s)	Sharon Lane	Canada	13.56	
3rd place, bronze medalist(s)	Grisel Machado	Cuba	13.60	
4	Candy Young	United States	13.67	
5	Cecilia Branch	Canada	14.03	
6	Beatriz Capotosto	Argentina	14.18	
7	Nancy Vallecilla	Ecuador	14.23	
8	María Larrazábal	Cuba	14.53	
