= 1977 European Athletics Indoor Championships – Women's 60 metres hurdles =

The women's 60 metres hurdles event at the 1977 European Athletics Indoor Championships was held on 12 March in San Sebastián.

== Medalists ==
Gold	Silver	Bronze
Lyubov Nikitenko; Soviet Union	Zofia Filip; Poland	Rita Bottiglieri; Italy

== Results ==
=== Heats ===
First 2 from each heat (Q) and the next 2 fastest (q) qualified for the final.

Rank	Heat	Name	Nationality	Time	Notes
1	1	Lyubov Nikitenko	Soviet Union	8.28	Q
2	1	Zofia Filip	Poland	8.31	Q
3	2	Margit Bartkowiak	East Germany	8.36	Q
4	1	Rita Bottiglieri	Italy	8.37	q
5	2	Danuta Wołosz	Poland	8.40	Q
6	2	Ileana Ongar	Italy	8.41	q
7	2	Lidiya Gusheva	Bulgaria	8.43	
8	2	Nadine Prévost	France	8.43	
9	1	Eleonore Leidel	West Germany	8.52	
10	2	Anke Weigt	West Germany	8.54	
11	1	Ulla Lempiäinen	Finland	8.60	
12	1	Laurence Lebeau	France	8.72	

=== Final ===
Rank	Lane	Name	Nationality	Time	Notes
1st place, gold medalist(s)	1	Lyubov Nikitenko	Soviet Union	8.29	
2nd place, silver medalist(s)	5	Zofia Filip	Poland	8.34	
3rd place, bronze medalist(s)	6	Rita Bottiglieri	Italy	8.39	
4	3	Margit Bartkowiak	East Germany	8.39	
5	4	Danuta Wołosz	Poland	8.42	
6	2	Ileana Ongar	Italy	8.47	
