= Elida Aveillé =

Personal information
- Full name: Elida María Aveillé Ugarte
- Born: 27 December 1961 (age 64)

Sport
- Sport: Athletics
- Event: Heptathlon
Medal record
Representing Cuba
Central American and Caribbean Games
Gold medal – first place	1978 Medellin	Pentathlon
Gold medal – first place	1982 Havana	Heptathlon

Elida María Aveillé Ugarte (born 27 December 1961) is a retired Cuban athlete who competed in the combined events. She won multiple medals at regional level.

== International competitions ==
Year	Competition	Venue	Position	Event	Notes
Representing Cuba
1977	Central American and Caribbean Championships	Xalapa, Mexico	1st	Pentathlon	3313 pts
1978	Central American and Caribbean Games	Medellín, Colombia	1st	Pentathlon	3636 pts
1978	Central American and Caribbean; Junior Championships (U20)	Xalapa, Mexico	2nd	100 m hurdles	15.18 s
1978	Central American and Caribbean; Junior Championships (U20)	Xalapa, Mexico	2nd	4 × 100 m relay	48.02 s
1979	Central American and Caribbean Championships	Guadalajara, Mexico	2nd	Pentathlon	3840 pts
1979	Pan American Games	Caracas, Venezuela	8th	Pentathlon	3706 pts
1981	Central American and Caribbean Championships	Santo Domingo, Dominican Republic	2nd	100 m hurdles	14.07 s
1981	Central American and Caribbean Championships	Santo Domingo, Dominican Republic	1st	Heptathlon	5312 pts
1981	Universiade	Bucharest, Romania	18th (h)	100 m hurdles	14.31 s
1981	Universiade	Bucharest, Romania	11th	Heptathlon	5385 pts
1982	Central American and Caribbean Games	Havana, Cuba	1st	Heptathlon	5579 pts
1983	Universiade	Edmonton, Canada	6th	Heptathlon	5717 pts
1983	Pan American Games	Caracas, Venezuela	3rd	100 m hurdles	13.41 s
1983	Pan American Games	Caracas, Venezuela	4th	4 × 100 m relay	45.09 s
1983	Pan American Games	Caracas, Venezuela	3rd	Heptathlon	5755 pts
1983	Ibero-American Championships	Barcelona, Spain	1st	100 m hurdles	13.29 s
