= 1984 European Athletics Indoor Championships – Women's 60 metres hurdles =

The women's 60 metres hurdles event at the 1984 European Athletics Indoor Championships was held on 3 March.

== Medalists ==
| Gold | Silver | Bronze |
|---|---|---|
| Lucyna Kałek; Poland | Vera Akimova; Soviet Union | Yordanka Donkova; Bulgaria |

== Results ==
=== Heats ===
First 3 from each heat (Q) and the next 2 fastest (q) qualified for the final.

| Rank | Heat | Name | Nationality | Time | Notes |
|---|---|---|---|---|---|
| 1 | 1 | Lucyna Kałek | Poland | 7.94 | Q |
| 2 | 1 | Vera Akimova | Soviet Union | 8.03 | Q |
| 3 | 2 | Edith Oker | West Germany | 8.09 | Q |
| 4 | 2 | Yordanka Donkova | Bulgaria | 8.22 | Q |
| 5 | 1 | Ulrike Denk | West Germany | 8.24 | Q |
| 6 | 2 | Marjan Olyslager | Netherlands | 8.26 | Q, NR |
| 7 | 1 | Jitka Tesárková | Czechoslovakia | 8.46 | q |
| 8 | 2 | Anne Piquereau | France | 8.57 | q |
| 9 | 1 | Semra Aksu | Turkey | 8.77 | |
| 10 | 2 | Eva Tillberg | Sweden | 8.79 | |

=== Final ===
| Rank | Name | Nationality | Time | Notes |
|---|---|---|---|---|
| 1st place, gold medalist(s) | Lucyna Kałek | Poland | 7.96 | |
| 2nd place, silver medalist(s) | Vera Akimova | Soviet Union | 7.99 | |
| 3rd place, bronze medalist(s) | Yordanka Donkova | Bulgaria | 8.09 | |
| 4 | Edith Oker | West Germany | 8.14 | |
| 5 | Ulrike Denk | West Germany | 8.14 | |
| 6 | Marjan Olyslager | Netherlands | 8.21 | NR |
| 7 | Jitka Tesárková | Czechoslovakia | 8.39 | |
| 8 | Anne Piquereau | France | 8.76 | |
