= Lucyna Langer =

Polish hurdler

Personal information
- Nationality: Polish
- Born: 9 January 1956 (age 70) Mysłowice, Stalinogród Voivodeship, Polish People's Republic

Sport
- Sport: Athletics
- Event: 100 metres hurdles
Medal record
Women's athletics
Representing Poland
Olympic Games
| Bronze medal – third place | 1980 Moscow | 100 m hurdles |
European Championships
| Gold medal – first place | 1982 Athens | 100 m hurdles |
Universiade
| Gold medal – first place | 1979 Mexico City | 100 m hurdles |

Lucyna Kałek (née Langer, born 9 January 1956) is a retired Polish hurdler. The highlights of her career in the 100 metres hurdles were winning the 1980 Olympic bronze medal and the gold medal at the 1982 European Championships. She also won the 1984 European Indoor Championships 60 metres hurdles title and was the fastest 100 metres hurdler in the world in 1984, with her career-best time of 12.43 secs.

== Career ==
Born in Mysłowice, Langer first ran under 13 seconds for the 100 metres hurdles with 12.89 secs in 1978, improving to 12.62 in 1979, when winning the Universiade title in Mexico City. When her Polish team-mate Grażyna Rabsztyn broke the world record with 12.36 secs in June 1980, Langer finished second in 12.44, to move to second on the world all-time list. She would go on to win an Olympic bronze medal six weeks later in Moscow, running 12.65.

In 1981 she beat American Stephanie Hightower, in the IAAF Golden Meet 100 hurdles in Berlin, in a time of 12.91

As Lucyna Kalek, she won the 1982 European title in Athens, in a season's best of 12.45 secs. The only woman to go faster that year was Yordanka Donkova with 12.44. Langer defeated Donkova in Athens and was ranked number one on the 1982 Track and Field News world merit rankings. She would go on to rank number one on the 1984 Track and Field News merit rankings. 1984 also saw her slightly improve her best to 12.43 secs in Hanover on 19 August, the fastest 100 metres hurdles time in the world that year, and a time that still ranks her (as of 2018) in the all-time top 20.

== International competitions ==
| Year | Competition | Venue | Position | Event | Notes |
Representing Poland
| 1978 | European Championships | Prague, Czechoslovakia | 5th | 100 m hurdles | 12.98 |
| 1979 | Universiade | Mexico City, Mexico | 1st | 100 m hurdles | 12.62 |
| 1980 | Olympic Games | Moscow, Soviet Union | 3rd | 100 m hurdles | 12.65 |
| 1980 | Olympic Games | Moscow, Soviet Union | 7th | 4 × 100 m relay | 44.49 |
| 1981 | World Cup | Rome, Italy | 3rd | 100 m hurdles | 12.97^{1} |
| 1982 | European Indoor Championships | Milan, Italy | 8th (sf) | 60 m hurdles | 8.13 |
| 1982 | European Championships | Athens, Greece | 1st | 100 m hurdles | 12.45 |
| 1984 | European Indoor Championships | Gothenburg, Sweden | 1st | 60 m hurdles | 7.96 |
| 1984 | Friendship Games | Moscow, Soviet Union | 3rd | 100 m hurdles | 12.61 |

^{1}Representing Europe

Sporting positions
| Preceded by (East Germany) Bettine Jahn | Women's 100m Hurdles Best Year Performance; 1984 | Succeeded by (Bulgaria) Ginka Zagorcheva |
