= Pam Page =

American track and field athlete

Pamela Jo Page (born February 12, 1958, in St. Louis, Missouri) is a retired American track and field athlete. She represented the United States at the 1984 Olympics running the 100 meters hurdles. She also ran in the 1983 World Championships in Athletics, 1985 IAAF World Indoor Games and the 1985 IAAF World Cup.

While running for the University of Missouri, she was the 1984 NCAA Champion. Her brother Nat Page is also a hurdler who ran for the University of Missouri.

Page participated in three Olympic Trials. In 1980, she finished fifth for the team that boycotted the Olympics. In 1984, she was part of a virtual four-way tie for the three qualifying places to the Olympics. Kim Turner was judged to be one one hundredth ahead for the win in 13.12. Benita Fitzgerald, Stephanie Hightower and Page all were given same time of 13.13. It was the closest finish in a major race. Page and Fitzgerald qualified to the Olympics and Hightower was left as the odd woman out. Fitzgerald went on to win the gold medal, and Turner in another unbreakable tie won a bronze, In 1988, she finished a non-qualifying fifth in the semi-final round.
