= Kim Turner (hurdler) =

American hurdler (born 1961)

Personal information
- Born: March 21, 1961 (age 65) Birmingham, Alabama, U.S.
Medal record
Women's track and field
Representing United States
Olympic Games
Bronze medal – third place	1984 Los Angeles	100 meter hurdles

Kimberly "Kim" Seals (née Turner, formerly McKenzie, born March 21, 1961) is an American former athlete who competed mainly in the 100 meter hurdles. She won the 1984 US Olympic trials and went on to win a bronze medal at the 1984 Los Angeles Olympics. She also won the 1988 US national title.

== Career ==
Turner was born in Birmingham, Alabama. While at Mumford High School in Detroit, Michigan she set the still standing NFHS national high school record in the 110 yard hurdles at 13.6. The federation converted record-keeping to metric distances shortly afterward.

Turner was an NCAA champion hurdler for the UTEP Miners track and field team, winning the 100 m hurdles at the 1984 NCAA Division I Outdoor Track and Field Championships.

Turner won the 100m hurdles at the 1984 US Olympic trials, running 13.12 seconds to win one of the closest races in history, as Benita Fitzgerald-Brown (2nd), Pam Page (3rd) and Stephanie Hightower (4th) all ran 13.13 secs. Two months later at the Los Angeles Olympics, she was again involved in a photo-finish, this time tying for the bronze medal with Michèle Chardonnet of France in 13.06, in a race won by Fitzgerald-Brown with Great Britain's Shirley Strong second.

Competing as Kim McKenzie, she won the 100m hurdles at the US Championships in June 1988, edging Benita Fitzgerald-Brown 12.84 to 12.85. A month later, she finished fifth in the 100m hurdles final at the US Olympic trials in 13.01 seconds. She finished fourth in the 60m hurdles final at the 1989 IAAF World Indoor Championships in 7.92 secs, and seventh in the final at the 1991 IAAF World Indoor Championships in 8.05 secs.

At the 1992 US Olympic trials, she failed to make the 100m hurdles final, finishing sixth in her semifinal in 13.28 secs. Three months later, she finished fifth at the 1992 IAAF World Cup, running 13.36. After her track career, she was the track and cross country coach at the Alabama A&M University for almost 20 years (1996–2015).

== Competition record ==
Note: In 1984 and 1988 the US Olympic Trials were a separate event from the National Championships.

Year	Competition	Venue	Position	Event	Notes
Representing United States
1983	Pan American Games	Caracas, Venezuela	2nd	100 m hurdles	13.39
1984	Olympic Games	Los Angeles, United States	=3rd	100 m hurdles	13.06
1989	World Indoor Championships	Budapest, Hungary	4th	60 m hurdles	7.92
1991	World Indoor Championships	Seville, Spain	7th	60 m hurdles	8.05
1992	World Cup	Havana, Cuba	5th	100 m hurdles	13.36
National Championships/Trials
1984	US Olympic Trials	Los Angeles, California	1st	100 m hurdles	13.12
1988	US Championships	Tampa, Florida	1st	100 m hurdles	12.84
1988	US Olympic Trials	Indianapolis, Indiana	5th	100 m hurdles	13.01
1989	US Indoor Championships	New York City, New York	1st	55 m hurdles	7.39
1989	US Championships	Houston, Texas	2nd	100 m hurdles	12.91
1990	US Championships	Norwalk, California	6th	100 m hurdles	13.38
1991	US Indoor Championships	New York City, New York	1st	60 m hurdles	8.12
1991	US Championships	New York City, New York	7th	100 m hurdles	13.23
1992	US Championships/Olympic Trials	New Orleans, Louisiana	12th (sf)	100 m hurdles	13.28
