= Grisel Machado =

Cuban athlete (born 1959)

Personal information
- Full name: Grisel Machado Ruiz
- Born: 25 October 1959 Esperanza, Cuba

Sport
- Sport: Athletics
- Event: 100 metres hurdles
Medal record
Representing Cuba
Pan American Games
Bronze medal – third place	1979 San Juan	100m hurdles
Central American and Caribbean Games
Gold medal – first place	1978 Medellin	100m hurdles
Gold medal – first place	1982 Havana	100m hurdles
Gold medal – first place	1978 Medellin	4x100m relay
Silver medal – second place	1986 Santiago	100m hurdles
Bronze medal – third place	1982 Havana	4x100m relay

Grisel Machado Ruiz (born 25 October 1959) is a retired Cuban athlete who specialised in the 100 metres hurdles. She won multiple medals at regional level.

Her personal best in the event is 13.18 seconds set in Havana in 1982.

== International competitions ==
Year	Competition	Venue	Position	Event	Notes
Representing Cuba
1977	Central American and Caribbean Championships	Xalapa, Mexico	1st	100 m hurdles	14.30
1977	Universiade	Sofia, Bulgaria	15th (h)	100 m hurdles	14.21
1977	Universiade	Sofia, Bulgaria	4th	4 × 100 m relay	44.81
1978	Central American and Caribbean Games	Medellín, Colombia	1st	100 m hurdles	13.31
1978	Central American and Caribbean Games	Medellín, Colombia	1st	4 × 100 m relay	44.37
1979	Pan American Games	San Juan, Puerto Rico	3rd	100 m hurdles	13.60
1981	Central American and Caribbean Championships	Santo Domingo, Dominican Republic	1st	100 m hurdles	13.72
1981	Central American and Caribbean Championships	Santo Domingo, Dominican Republic	4th	400 m hurdles	62.12
1981	Central American and Caribbean Championships	Santo Domingo, Dominican Republic	2nd	4 × 100 m relay	45.79
1981	World Cup	Rome, Italy	7th	100 m hurdles	13.76 (Note: Representing the Americas)
1982	Central American and Caribbean Games	Havana, Cuba	1st	100 m hurdles	13.18
1982	Central American and Caribbean Games	Havana, Cuba	3rd	4 × 100 m relay	45.85
1983	Universiade	Edmonton, Canada	10th (h)	100 m hurdles	13.49
1983	Central American and Caribbean Championships	Havana, Cuba	1st	100 m hurdles	13.64
1983	Central American and Caribbean Championships	Havana, Cuba	–	4 × 100 m relay	DQ
1983	Pan American Games	Caracas, Venezuela	4th	100 m hurdles	13.41
1984	Friendship Games	Moscow, Soviet Union	2nd (B)	100 m hurdles	13.64
1985	Central American and Caribbean Championships	Nassau, Bahamas	1st	100 m hurdles	13.43 (w)
1986	Central American and Caribbean Games	Santiago, Dominican Republic	2nd	100 m hurdles	13.56
