= Athletics at the Friendship Games – Women's 100 metres hurdles =

The women's 100 metres hurdles event at the Friendship Games was held on 16 August 1984 at the Evžen Rošický Stadium in Prague, Czechoslovakia.

== Medalists ==
Gold	Silver	Bronze
Yordanka Donkova; Bulgaria	Sabine Paetz; East Germany	Lucyna Kałek; Poland

== Results ==
=== Heats ===
Wind:
Heat 1: +0.8 m/s, Heat 2: -0.4 m/s

Rank	Heat	Name	Nationality	Time	Notes
1	2	Lucyna Kałek	Poland	12.58	Q
2	1	Sabine Paetz	East Germany	12.67	Q
3	1	Yordanka Donkova	Bulgaria	12.67	Q
4	2	Vera Akimova	Soviet Union	12.69	Q
5	2	Svetlana Gusarova	Soviet Union	12.75	Q
6	2	Ginka Zagorcheva	Bulgaria	12.81	q
7	1	Nadezhda Korshunova	Soviet Union	13.06	Q
8	1	Xénia Siska	Hungary	13.29	q
9	2	Jana Petříková	Czechoslovakia	13.66	qB
10	2	Grisel Machado	Cuba	13.69	qB
11	1	Milena Tebichová	Czechoslovakia	13.85	qB
12	2	Beatrice Plüss	Switzerland	14.11	qB
13	1	Sabine Seitl	Austria	14.36	qB
13	2	Ulrike Kleindl	Austria	14.36	qB
	1	Ana-Isabel Oliveira	Portugal	??.??	qB

=== "A" Final ===
Wind: +0.2 m/s

Rank	Lane	Name	Nationality	Time	Notes
1st place, gold medalist(s)	4	Yordanka Donkova	Bulgaria	12.55	
2nd place, silver medalist(s)	6	Sabine Paetz	East Germany	12.60	
3rd place, bronze medalist(s)	5	Lucyna Kałek	Poland	12.61	
4	3	Vera Akimova	Soviet Union	12.62	
5	8	Svetlana Gusarova	Soviet Union	12.77	
6	2	Ginka Zagorcheva	Bulgaria	12.86	
7	1	Nadezhda Korshunova	Soviet Union	12.93	
8	7	Xénia Siska	Hungary	13.06	

=== "B" Final ===
Wind: -0.5 m/s

Rank	Name	Nationality	Time	Notes
1	Jana Petříková	Czechoslovakia	13.62	
2	Grisel Machado	Cuba	13.64	
3	Sabine Seitl	Austria	14.09	
4	Beatrice Plüss	Switzerland	14.15	
5	Ulrike Kleindl	Austria	14.48	
6	Ana-Isabel Oliveira	Portugal	14.56	
7	Milena Tebichová	Czechoslovakia	14.61	

== See also ==
- Athletics at the 1984 Summer Olympics – Women's 100 metres hurdles
