= Xénia Siska =

Hungarian hurdler

Medal record

Women's athletics

Representing Hungary

IAAF World Indoor Games
Gold medal – first place	1985 Paris	60 m hurdles

Xénia Siska (born 3 November 1957) is a Hungarian track and field athlete who specialised in the 100 metres hurdles. She is her country's best ever female sprint hurdler, holding from 1984 to 2020 the Hungarian record in the 100 m hurdles (12.76 seconds), and from 1985 to 2019 the 60 metres hurdles and 50 metres hurdles. She is also a co-holder of the 4 × 100 metres relay national record.

Her most significant achievement was a gold medal at the 1985 IAAF World Indoor Games in the 60 m hurdles event. She was a semi-finalist at the 1980 Moscow Olympics and the 1983 World Championships in Athletics. She was also twice a semi-finalist at the European Athletics Championships (1978 and 1986).

== Career ==
Born in Budapest, she won her first continental medal at the 1975 European Athletics Junior Championships at the age of seventeen, coming third in the 100 m hurdles. She joined Vasas SC, a major sports club in Budapest. In 1978 she won her first senior national titles at the Hungarian championships, winning the 60 metres hurdles indoor title then the 100 m hurdles title outdoors. The 1978 European Athletics Championships was the venue of her major international debut and she reached the semi-final stage, running a time of 13.36 seconds.

Siska defended her Hungarian 60 m hurdles title in 1979 – she would go undefeated in this competition until 1982. This led to her selection for the 1979 European Athletics Indoor Championships and she was again a semi-finalist at continental level. Outdoors, she was bested by pentathlete Margit Papp in the 100 m hurdles at the Hungarian Championships. She returned to the top of the national scene in 1980 and ran a personal best time of 13.17 seconds, ranking in the top-25 hurdlers that year. Her Olympic debut followed, as she was chosen to compete for Hungary at the 1980 Summer Olympics in Moscow. She did not reach the final, falling in the semi-final and failing to finish the race.

She finally reached a senior final at the 1981 European Athletics Indoor Championships, where she placed sixth in the 50 metres hurdles after running a best of 6.89 seconds in the qualifiers. After winning her fifth and final 60 m hurdles national title, she was entered into the 1982 European Athletics Indoor Championships, but did not progress to the final. She continued to improve as an athlete outdoors, winning the 1983 national title in a championship record time 13.20 seconds. The inaugural 1983 World Championships in Athletics marked her second appearance on the global stage and she reached the semi-finals of the 100 m hurdles.

Her breakthrough in the 100 m hurdles event came in 1984: at the age of 26 she set a Hungarian record of 12.76 seconds in Budapest. This time placed her eleventh on the global rankings for the season. She won a national title in the 100 metres, though her winning time over twelve seconds was the slowest to win the event for over two decades. With the Eastern Bloc nations boycotting the 1984 Los Angeles Olympics, she competed at the Friendship Games instead and place eighth. For her performances she was selected as the female Hungarian Athlete of the Year by the national federation. The greatest achievement of her career followed at the 1985 IAAF World Indoor Games. At the event (a precursor to the modern IAAF World Indoor Championships) she set a lifetime best of eight seconds flat for the 60 m hurdles in qualifying then went on to take the gold medal in the final. Outdoors she had a season's best of 12.99 seconds, enough to place in the top twenty for the year.

In 1986 she set the Hungarian Championships record at 12.92 seconds – a mark which remains undefeated. She came close to her personal best in Budapest in August, running 12.77 seconds to finish eleventh on the world season's rankings. The standard of competition was high at the 1986 European Athletics Championships; in spite of running 12.90 in the semi-finals, this was only enough for fifth in the race which was won by Yordanka Donkova, who broke the world record that year. After the competition, Siska topped the podium at the Athletissima meeting in Lausanne with a run of 12.86 seconds.

Her 1987 season was highlighted by a run of 12.77 seconds in Budapest, which placed her seventh in the world rankings for the season. This marked the last time that she featured near the top of the rankings. In 1988 she won an eighth Hungarian 100 m hurdles – the last national title of her career.

== Personal bests ==
- 100 metres hurdles – 12.76 seconds (1984)
- 60 metres hurdles – 8.00 seconds (1985)
- 50 metres hurdles – 6.89 seconds (1981)
- 4×100 metres relay – 44.34 seconds (1982)

== National titles ==
- 100 metres hurdles: 1978, 1980, 1981, 1982, 1983, 1984, 1986, 1988
- 100 metres: 1984
- 60 metres hurdles: 1978, 1979, 1980, 1981, 1982

== International competitions ==
Year	Competition	Venue	Position	Event	Notes
1975	European Junior Championships	Athens, Greece	3rd	100 m hurdles	14.07
1978	European Championships	Prague, Czechoslovakia	10th (sf)	100 m hurdles	13.36
1979	European Indoor Championships	Vienna, Austria	9th (sf)	60 m hurdles	8.37
1980	Olympic Games	Moscow, Soviet Union	DNF (sf)	100 m hurdles	13.23 (heats)
1981	European Indoor Championships	Grenoble, France	6th	50 m hurdles	7.02
1982	European Indoor Championships	Milan, Italy	11th (sf)	60 m hurdles	8.18
1983	World Championships	Helsinki, Finland	16th (sf)	100 m hurdles	13.68
1984	Friendship Games	Prague, Czechoslovakia	8th	100 m hurdles	13.06
1985	World Indoor Games	Paris, France	1st	60 m hurdles	8.03
1986	European Championships	Stuttgart, West Germany	10th (sf)	100 m hurdles	12.90
Results with (sf) indicate overall position in semifinal round. DNF = did not finish.
