= Zofia Bielczyk =

Polish hurdler (born 1958)

Personal information
- Nationality: Polish
- Born: 22 September 1958 (age 67) Warsaw, Poland
- Died: Poland
Medal record
Women's athletics
Representing Poland
European Indoor Championships
Gold medal – first place	1980 Sindelfingen	60 m hurdles
Gold medal – first place	1981 Grenoble	60 m hurdles
Silver medal – second place	1977 San Sebastián	60 m hurdles

Zofia Bielczyk (née Filip; born 22 September 1958 in Warsaw) is a retired Polish hurdler. She achieved her biggest successes indoors, winning three medals at the European Indoor Championships.

Her indoor personal bests of 6.74 seconds for the 50 metres hurdles and 7.77 seconds for the 60 metres hurdles are former World records and still standing Polish records. In addition, her outdoor personal best for the 100 metres hurdles is 12.63.

She is married to a former javelin thrower, Piotr Bielczyk.

== Competition record ==
Year	Competition	Venue	Position	Event	Notes
Representing Poland
1975	European Junior Championships	Athens, Greece	5th	100 m	11.70 (w)
1975	European Junior Championships	Athens, Greece	2nd	4 × 100 m relay	44.93
1977	European Indoor Championships	San Sebastián, Spain	2nd	60 m hurdles	8.34
1978	European Indoor Championships	Milan, Italy	5th	60 m hurdles	8.26
1978	European Championships	Prague, Czech Republic	5th	4 × 100 m relay	43.83
1980	European Indoor Championships	Sindelfingen, West Germany	4th	60 m	7.34
1980	European Indoor Championships	Sindelfingen, West Germany	1st	60 m hurdles	7.77
1980	Olympic Games	Moscow, Soviet Union	8th	100 m hurdles	13.08
1980	Olympic Games	Moscow, Soviet Union	7th	4 × 100 m relay	44.49
1981	European Indoor Championships	Grenoble, France	1st	50 m hurdles	6.74
