= Irina Litovchenko =

Soviet hurdler

Personal information
- Nationality: Soviet
- Born: 29 March 1950 (age 76)

Sport
- Sport: Track and field
- Event: 100 metres hurdles

Irina Litovchenko (born 29 May 1950) is a Soviet hurdler. She competed in the women's 100 metres hurdles at the 1980 Summer Olympics.
