= Ulrike Denk =

German hurdler (born 1964)

Personal information
- Born: 10 May 1964 (age 62) Cologne, West Germany
- Height: 1.70 m (5 ft 7 in)
- Weight: 53 kg (117 lb)

Sport
- Sport: Athletics
- Events: 100 m hurdles, 60 m hurdles
- Club: ASV Köln; SV Bayer 04 Leverkusen

Ulrike Denk (born 10 May 1964 in Cologne) is a German former athlete who competed in the sprint hurdles. In 1983, she broke the world junior record in the 60 metres hurdles with 8.06, which was only broken in 2015 by Dior Hall. Denk represented West Germany at the 1984 Summer Olympics, finishing seventh, and 1983 World Championships, reaching the semifinals.

Her personal bests are 12.84 seconds in the 100 metres hurdles (+1.1 m/s; Stuttgart 1985) and 7.91 seconds in the 60 metres hurdles (Madrid 1986).

== International competitions ==
Year	Competition	Venue	Position	Event	Notes
Representing West Germany
1983	European Indoor Championships	Budapest, Hungary	5th	60 m hurdles	8.20
1983	World Championships	Helsinki, Finland	11th (sf)	100 m hurdles	13.16
1984	European Indoor Championships	Gothenburg, Sweden	5th	60 m hurdles	8.14
1984	Olympic Games	Los Angeles, United States	7th	100 m hurdles	13.32
1985	European Indoor Championships	Piraeus, Greece	5th	60 m hurdles	8.09
1986	European Indoor Championships	Madrid, Spain	4th	60 m hurdles	7.91
