= 1984 European Athletics Indoor Championships – Women's 60 metres =

The women's 60 metres event at the 1984 European Athletics Indoor Championships was held on 4 March.

== Medalists ==
Gold	Silver	Bronze
Bev Kinch; Great Britain	Anelia Nuneva; Bulgaria	Nelli Cooman; Netherlands

== Results ==
=== Heats ===
First 3 from each heat (Q) and the next 2 fastest (q) qualified for the final.

Rank	Heat	Name	Nationality	Time	Notes
1	1	Nelli Cooman	Netherlands	7.25	Q, NR
2	1	Bev Kinch	Great Britain	7.26	Q
3	2	Jayne Christian	Great Britain	7.29	Q
4	2	Anelia Nuneva	Bulgaria	7.29	Q
5	1	Eva Murková	Czechoslovakia	7.41	Q
5	2	Els Vader	Netherlands	7.41	Q
5	2	Lena Möller	Sweden	7.41	q
8	2	Edith Oker	West Germany	7.42	q
9	1	Daniela Ferrian	Italy	7.47	
10	1	Linda Haglund	Sweden	7.47	
11	2	Teresa Rioné	Spain	7.49	
12	1	Dorthe Rasmussen	Denmark	7.53	
12	2	Štěpánka Sokolová	Czechoslovakia	7.53	
14	2	Pia Engström	Sweden	7.64	
15	1	Marjan Olyslager	Netherlands	7.70	

=== Final ===
Rank	Name	Nationality	Time	Notes
1st place, gold medalist(s)	Bev Kinch	Great Britain	7.16	
2nd place, silver medalist(s)	Anelia Nuneva	Bulgaria	7.23	
3rd place, bronze medalist(s)	Nelli Cooman	Netherlands	7.23	NR
4	Jayne Christian	Great Britain	7.30	
5	Eva Murková	Czechoslovakia	7.35	
6	Edith Oker	West Germany	7.42	
7	Lena Möller	Sweden	7.42	
	Els Vader	Netherlands	DNS	
