= Athletics at the 1981 Summer Universiade – Women's heptathlon =

The women's heptathlon event at the 1981 Summer Universiade was held at the Stadionul 23 August in Bucharest on 21 and 22 July 1981. It was the first time that this event was contested at the Universiade replacing the pentathlon.

== Results ==
The highest mark recorded in each event is highlighted in yellow.

Rank	Athlete	Nationality	100m H	HJ	SP	200m	LJ	JT	800m	Points	Notes
1st place, gold medalist(s)	Małgorzata Guzowska	Poland	13.93	14.51	1.85	24.97	6.36	38.72	2:19.20	6198	
2nd place, silver medalist(s)	Nadezhda Vinogradova	Soviet Union	14.58	13.78	1.73	23.90	6.24	36.30	2:09.10	6133	
3rd place, bronze medalist(s)	Corina Țifrea	Romania	14.07	12.61	1.73	24.89	6.29	40.42	2:14.72	6033	NR
4	Judy Livermore	Great Britain								5938	
5	Olga Rukavishnikova	Soviet Union	14.04	12.75	1.76	24.84	6.23	30.02	2:11.44	5938	
6	Jillian Ross-Giffen	Canada								5870	
7	Coculeana Oltean	Romania								5847	
8	Daniela Nenova	Bulgaria								5695	
9	Birgit Dressel	West Germany								5617	
10	Nadine Debois	France	14.95	10.92	1.76	25.91	5.83	28.42	2:15.77	5449	
11	Elida Aveillé	Cuba								5385	
12	Yeh Peisu	China								5268	
13	Mina Zeina	Lebanon								4161	
	Mary Harrington	United States								DNF	
	Patsy Walker	United States								DNF	
