= June Caddle =

Personal information
- Born: 15 July 1957

Sport
- Sport: Athletics
- Event(s): 100 metres, 100 metres hurdles

June Caddle (born 15 July 1957) is a retired Barbadian athlete who competed in sprinting and hurdling events. She represented her country at the inaugural World Championships in Helsinki. Her biggest success was the bronze medal in 100 metres hurdles at the 1982 Central American and Caribbean Games.

== International competitions ==
Year	Competition	Venue	Position	Event	Notes
Representing Barbados
1974	Central American and Caribbean; Junior Championships (U20)	Maracaibo, Venezuela	5th (h)	200 m	25.06 (w)
1974	Central American and Caribbean; Junior Championships (U20)	Maracaibo, Venezuela	8th	400 m	61.9
1976	CARIFTA Games (U20)	Nassau, Bahamas	3rd	100 m hurdles	15.1 (w)
1978	Central American and Caribbean Games	Medellín, Colombia	5th	100 m	12.19
1978	Central American and Caribbean Games	Medellín, Colombia	5th	100 m hurdles	14.34
1978	Commonwealth Games	Edmonton, Canada	21st (h)	100 m	12.09
1978	Commonwealth Games	Edmonton, Canada	8th	100 m hurdles	14.13 (w)
1979	Pan American Games	San Juan, Puerto Rico	13th (sf)	100 m	12.09
1979	Pan American Games	San Juan, Puerto Rico	11th (h)	100 m hurdles	14.63
1982	Central American and Caribbean Games	Havana, Cuba	3rd	100 m hurdles	14.08
1982	Commonwealth Games	Brisbane, Australia	24th (h)	100 m	11.96 (w)
1982	Commonwealth Games	Brisbane, Australia	14th (h)	100 m hurdles	13.97
1982	Commonwealth Games	Brisbane, Australia	–	400 m hurdles	DNF
1983	World Championships	Helsinki, Finland	40th (h)	100 m	12.56
1983	World Championships	Helsinki, Finland	34th (h)	100 m hurdles	14.89 (w)
