= Edith Oker =

German former athlete (born 1961)

Personal information
- Born: 1 February 1961 (age 65) Stuttgart, West Germany
- Height: 1.68 m (5 ft 6 in)
- Weight: 56 kg (123 lb)

Sport
- Sport: Athletics
- Events: 100 m hurdles, 60 m hurdles
- Club: Stuttgarter Kickers; VfB Stuttgart; SV Bayer 04 Leverkusen

Edith Erna Oker (born 1 February 1961, in Stuttgart) is a German former athlete who competed in the sprint hurdles. She represented West Germany at the 1984 Summer Olympics reaching the semifinals.

Her personal bests are 13.14 seconds in the 100 metres hurdles (+Los Angeles 1984) and 8.04 seconds in the 60 metres hurdles (Sindelfingen 1984).

== International competitions ==
| Year | Competition | Venue | Position | Event | Notes |
Representing West Germany
| 1979 | European Junior Championships | Bydgoszcz, Poland | 3rd | 100 m hurdles | 13.70 |
| 1979 | European Junior Championships | Bydgoszcz, Poland | 3rd | 4 × 100 m relay | 44.84 |
| 1979 | European Junior Championships | Bydgoszcz, Poland | 4th | Long jump | 6.26 m |
| 1981 | European Indoor Championships | Grenoble, France | 8th (h) | 50 m hurdles | 6.97^{1} |
| 1983 | European Indoor Championships | Budapest, Hungary | 6th | 60 m hurdles | 8.21 |
| 1984 | European Indoor Championships | Gothenburg, Sweden | 6th | 60 m | 7.42 |
| 1984 | European Indoor Championships | Gothenburg, Sweden | 4th | 60 m hurdles | 8.14 |
| 1984 | Olympic Games | Los Angeles, United States | 10th (sf) | 100 m hurdles | 13.37 |
| 1984 | Olympic Games | Los Angeles, United States | 5th | 4 × 100 m relay | 43.57 |
| 1985 | European Indoor Championships | Piraeus, Greece | 7th (sf) | 60 m hurdles | 8.12 |
| 1986 | European Championships | Stuttgart, West Germany | 22nd (h) | 100 m hurdles | 13.76 |
| 1987 | European Indoor Championships | Liévin, France | 10th (sf) | 60 m hurdles | 8.13 |

^{1}Did not finish in the semifinals
