= Yelena Biserova =

Soviet-Russian track and field hurdler (born 1962)

Personal information
- Born: 24 March 1962 (age 64) Leningrad, Soviet Union

Sport
- Sport: Track and field
Medal record
Representing Soviet Union
Summer Universiade
Silver medal – second place	1983 Edmonton	100m hurdles

Yelena Biserova (born 24 March 1962) is a Russian female former track and field hurdler who competed for the Soviet Union in the 100 metres hurdles. She represented her country at the 1983 World Championships in Athletics and the 1982 European Athletics Indoor Championships, finishing sixth at the global event. She was the silver medallist in the sprint hurdles at the 1983 Summer Universiade, behind her compatriot Natalya Petrova.

Biserova set a personal best time of 12.66 seconds for the 100 m hurdles in 1984, which ranked her in the top ten globally for that year.

== International competitions ==
Year	Competition	Venue	Position	Event	Notes
1982	European Indoor Championships	Milan, Italy	7th (q)	60 m hurdles	8.10
1983	Universiade	Edmonton, Canada	2nd	100 m hurdles	13.07
1983	World Championships	Helsinki, Finland	6th	100 m hurdles	12.80 w
