= Daniela Valkova =

Bulgarian hurdler

Personal information
- Nationality: Bulgarian
- Born: 20 February 1949 (age 77)

Sport
- Sport: Track and field
- Event: 100 metres hurdles

Daniela Valkova (born 20 February 1949) is a Bulgarian hurdler. She competed in the women's 100 metres hurdles at the 1980 Summer Olympics.
