= Elżbieta Rabsztyn =

Polish hurdler

Personal information
- Born: 25 August 1956 Warsaw, Poland
- Height: 1.68 m (5 ft 6 in)
- Weight: 58 kg (128 lb)

Sport
- Sport: Athletics
- Event: 100 m hurdles
- Club: Gwardia Warszawa
Medal record
Representing Poland
Summer Universiade
Bronze medal – third place	1981 Bucharest	100m hurdles

Elżbieta Rabsztyn (born 25 August 1956 in Warsaw) is a retired Polish athlete specialising in the sprint hurdles. She won a bronze medal at the 1981 Summer Universiade.

Her personal bests are 12.80 seconds in the 110 metres hurdles (+1.9 m/s, Warsaw 1980) and 8.03 seconds in the 60 metres hurdles (Sindelfingen 1980).

In 1982 she married German hurdler Harald Schmid. They have two children, Alexander and Bianca, who also competed in athletics. Her sister, Grażyna Rabsztyn, is also a former hurdler.

== International competitions ==
Year	Competition	Venue	Position	Event	Notes
Representing Poland
1978	European Indoor Championships	Milan, Italy	7th (sf)	60 m hurdles	8.22
1978	European Championships	Prague, Czechoslovakia	7th	100 m hurdles	13.17
1980	European Indoor Championships	Sindelfingen, West Germany	17th (h)	60 m	7.60
1980	European Indoor Championships	Sindelfingen, West Germany	4th	60 m hurdles	8.05
1981	European Indoor Championships	Grenoble, France	7th (sf)	50 m hurdles	6.90
1981	Universiade	Bucharest, Romania	3rd	100 m hurdles	13.31
