= Sophia Hunter =

Jamaican hurdler (born 1964)

Personal information
- Nationality: Jamaican
- Born: 9 December 1964 (age 61)

Sport
- Sport: Track and field
- Event: 100 metres hurdles
Medal record
Representing United States
Summer Universiade
Bronze medal – third place	1987 Zagreb	100m hurdles

Sophia Loren Hunter (born 9 December 1964) is a Jamaican hurdler. She competed in the women's 100 metres hurdles at the 1984 Summer Olympics.

Hunter competed for the Delaware State Hornets track and field team in the NCAA. She later changed her sporting allegiance to the United States and competed at the USA Outdoor Track and Field Championships.
