= Bettine Jahn =

East German hurdler

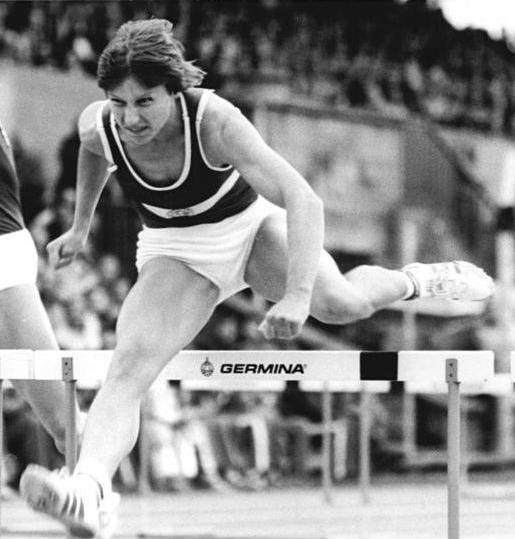

Medal record

Women's athletics

Representing East Germany

World Championships
Gold medal – first place	1983 Helsinki	100 m hurdles

Bettine Jahn (née Gärtz, born 3 August 1958) is an East German hurdler. She became a world champion in the 100 metres hurdles and a world record holder in the 60 metres hurdles.

== Career ==
She was born in Magdeburg and represented the club SC Karl-Marx-Stadt. Her biggest achievement was to win the 100-meter hurdles at the 1983 World Championships in Helsinki. She also won the silver medal at the 1982 European Indoor Championships and the gold medal at the 1983 European Indoor Championships, as well as the 1983 European Cup Super League meet.

She finished seventh at the 1980 Olympic Games and fourth at the 1982 European Championships, only 0.01 seconds behind compatriot Kerstin Knabe. She won the East German championships in 1982 and 1983, the East German indoor championships in 1980 and 1983, and also the open 1983 Hungarian indoor championships.

She set an indoor world record for the 60 metres hurdles in 1983. She is still the German record holder for the 100 metres hurdles with 12.42 seconds.

== Personal life ==
She married in January 1983 and was initially referred to as Bettine Jahn-Gärtz in the media but later Bettine Jahn.
