= Svetlana Gusarova =

Kazakh track and field hurdler

Medal record

Women's athletics

Representing the Soviet Union

IAAF World Cup
Bronze medal – third place	1985 Canberra	100 m hurdles

Svetlana Gusarova (Russian: Светлана Гусарова; born 29 May 1959) is a Kazakhstani former track and field hurdler who competed in the 100 metres hurdles for the Soviet Union. She set her lifetime best of 12.61 seconds in 1985 in Saint Petersburg (then Leningrad). This time ranked her third in the world for that year. She also held a 60 metres hurdles best of 7.97 seconds.

Gusarova won a bronze medal in the 100 m hurdles at the 1985 IAAF World Cup, helping the Soviet women to second on the team rankings. She was a one-time national champion, winning the 60 m hurdles at the Soviet Indoor Athletics Championships in 1983.

== International competitions ==
Year	Competition	Venue	Position	Event	Notes
1984	Friendship Games	Prague, Czechoslovakia	5th	100 m hurdles	12.77
1985	World Cup	Canberra, Australia	3rd	100 m hurdles	13.01

== National titles ==
- Soviet Indoor Athletics Championships
  - 60 m hurdles: 1983
