= Candy Young =

American hurdler (born 1962)

Personal information
- Born: May 21, 1962 (age 64) Beaver Falls, Pennsylvania

Sport
- Sport: Track and field

Candy Young (born May 21, 1962) is a retired American track and field athlete who was a record-setting hurdler at Beaver Falls High School in Beaver Falls, Pennsylvania.

== High school career ==
While running in the 1979 USA Outdoor Track and Field Championships at Mt. SAC in Walnut, California she set the national high school record for the 100 metres hurdles at 12.95 (with an aiding wind of 1.5 mps) over full size .84 m (2 ft 9 in) hurdles. Just 26 days after her 17th birthday, that mark also still stands as the World Youth Best. Even the "best" for .764 m (2 ft 6 in) shorter hurdles is .13 slower. It also stands as the American Junior Record, tied ten years later by collegian Cinnamon Sheffield at altitude. Earlier in the 1979 season, she had set the World Youth Best for the indoor 50 metres hurdles 5.95 at a meet in Edmonton. That mark also still stands. She was Sports Illustrated High School Athlete of the Year for 1979. She was also Track and Field News "High School Athlete of the Year."

== College and Olympics ==
After high school, she went to Fairleigh Dickinson University, where she won four NCAA Indoor Championships.

In 1980, she qualified for the ill-fated United States Olympic team by finishing third in the Olympic Trials. Barely over age 18, she was the second youngest hurdler to qualify for the U.S. Olympic Team behind Constance Darnowski. Years later, Young did receive one of 461 Congressional Gold Medals created especially for the spurned athletes. She finished 5th in the 1984 Olympic Trials, a step behind what looked like a 4-way tie for first place. She returned in 1988 but was unable to make it out of the semi-finals. In all three of her Olympic Trials attempts, she was bested by Benita Fitzgerald and Stephanie Hightower, who later became President of USATF.

Young remained a top level hurdler through 1989 when she set her personal best in the 60 metres hurdles of 8.10 at the IAAF World Indoor Championships.

Under her married name of Candy Young Sanders, she is currently the associate athletic director at Delaware State University.
