= Elissavet Pantazi =

Greek hurdler

Personal information
- Nationality: Greek
- Born: 21 May 1956 (age 70) Volos, Greece

Sport
- Sport: Track and field
- Event: 100 metres hurdles
Medal record
Representing Greece
Mediterranean Games
Silver medal – second place	1979 Split	100m hurdles
Silver medal – second place	1983 Casablanca	100m hurdles
Bronze medal – third place	1979 Split	4x100m relay

Elissavet Pantazi (born 21 May 1956) is a Greek hurdler. She competed in the women's 100 metres hurdles at the 1984 Summer Olympics.
