= Sue Kameli =

Canadian hurdler (born 1956)

Personal information
- Born: September 17, 1956 (age 69) Toronto, Ontario, Canada

Sport
- Sport: Track and field
Medal record
Representing Canada
Commonwealth Games
Bronze medal – third place	1982 Brisbane	100m hurdles

Susan Elaine "Sue" Bradley-Kameli (born September 17, 1956) is a retired Canadian hurdler who specialized in the 100 metres hurdles.

Susan went on to have an exciting running career where she finished sixth at the 1975 Pan American Games and won the bronze medal at the 1982 Commonwealth Games. She also competed at the 1976 Olympic Games, the 1983 World Championships and the 1984 Olympic Games without reaching the final. Susan also made the 1980 Canadian Olympic team. She became Canadian champion in 1974, 1980, 1982 and 1983. Her personal best time was 13.10seconds, achieved in 1983.

Kameli competed in the AIAW for the San Diego State Aztecs track and field team, finishing 5th in the 100 m hurdles at the 1980 AIAW Outdoor Track and Field Championships.
