= Sylvia Malgadey-Forgrave =

Canadian hurdler

Personal information
- Born: 22 May 1957 (age 69) Kitchener, Ontario, Canada

Sport
- Sport: Track and field
- Event: 100 metres hurdles

Sylvia Malgadey-Forgrave (born 22 May 1957) is a Canadian hurdler. She competed in the women's 100 metres hurdles at the 1984 Summer Olympics.
