= Semra Aksu =

Turkish sprinter (born 1962)

Personal information
- Nationality: Turkish
- Born: 31 May 1962 (age 63) İzmir, Turkey

Sport
- Sport: Sprinting
- Event: 100 metres

Semra Aksu Bayan (born 31 May 1962) is a Turkish former sprinter. She competed in the women's 100 metres at the 1984 Summer Olympics.
