= Natalya Petrova =

Russian track and field hurdler (born 1957)

Personal information
- Born: 16 November 1957 (age 68)

Sport
- Sport: Track and field
Medal record
Representing Soviet Union
Summer Universiade
Gold medal – first place	1983 Edmonton	100m hurdles

Natalya Petrova (née Kokulenko; born 16 November 1957) is a Russian female former track and field hurdler who competed for the Soviet Union in the 100 metres hurdles. She represented her country at the 1983 World Championships in Athletics and the 1982 European Athletics Indoor Championships, finishing fourth on both occasions. She was the gold medallist in the sprint hurdles at the 1983 Universiade.

She was a one-time national champion, having won the 60 metres hurdles at the 1982 Soviet Indoor Championships. She achieved her personal best at the World Championships in 1983, running a time of 12.83 seconds in qualifying.

== International competitions ==
Year	Competition	Venue	Position	Event	Notes
1982	European Indoor Championships	Milan, Italy	4th	60 m hurdles	8.16
1983	Universiade	Edmonton, Canada	1st	100 m hurdles	13.04
1983	World Championships	Helsinki, Finland	4th	100 m hurdles	12.67 w

== National titles ==
- Soviet Indoor Athletics Championships
  - 60 m hurdles: 1982
