= Stephanie Hightower =

American hurdler (born 1958)

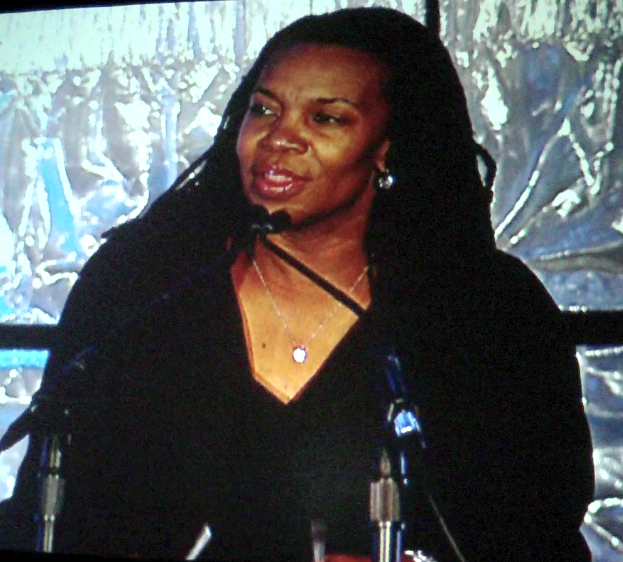

Personal information
- Born: July 19, 1958 (age 68) Louisville, Kentucky, United States

Sport
- Sport: Track and field
Medal record
Representing United States
Pan American Games
Silver medal – second place	1987 Indianapolis	100 m hurdles
Summer Universiade
Gold medal – first place	1981 Bucharest	100 m hurdles
Liberty Bell Classic
Gold medal – first place	1980 Philadelphia	100 m hurdles

Stephanie Hightower (born July 19, 1958) is an American former hurdler, community leader, nonprofit executive, and former president of USA Track & Field (USATF). She is a four-time U.S. Champion at 100 meter hurdles and a five-time U.S. Indoor Champion at 60 meter hurdles. She also won the 1980 U.S. Olympic Trials, but was prevented from competing in the Moscow Olympics due to the boycott. She won a silver medal at the 1987 Pan American Games.

Hightower became president of USA Track & Field in December 2008. She resigned as chair of the USATF board in April 2015 and was elected to the IAAF Council in August 2015 She resigned as president of USATF in December 2016. Since 2011, she has served as the first female president and CEO of the Columbus Urban League in Columbus, Ohio.

== Early life ==
Stephanie A. Hightower was born on July 19, 1958, in Louisville, Kentucky, into a military family. Her parents were originally from Warren, Ohio, and her maternal uncle is Paul Warfield, the Pro Football Hall of Fame wide receiver who played for the Cleveland Browns and Miami Dolphins and competed as an athlete at The Ohio State University. Hightower's father served in the U.S. military for 30 years, including tours in Vietnam and Korea, and the family lived in multiple locations during her childhood, including Maryland, Washington D.C., Germany, and Kentucky. While living in Germany in sixth and seventh grade, Hightower initially aspired to be a ballerina. Her athletic ability emerged during an "Olympic Day" event at school, where she discovered she could outrun her male classmates. When the family relocated to Fort Knox, Kentucky, she attended Jesse Stuart High School in nearby Valley Station, where coach Miss Dawson encouraged her to compete as a hurdler. She excelled in the event, winning state championships and setting Kentucky High School Athletic Association records in the 110-yard hurdles (14.3 seconds) and the 60-yard hurdles (8.0 seconds). Hightower enrolled at The Ohio State University, where her uncle Paul Warfield had competed, partly at the encouragement of legendary football coach Woody Hayes. She was among the first women to receive an athletic scholarship in track and field at Ohio State, arriving as the university was implementing Title IX. She graduated in 1981 with a degree in communications and was a member of Delta Sigma Theta sorority, an organization she continues to serve.

== Athletic career ==
Hightower was a collegiate track star at Ohio State University. From 1977 to 1980, she did not lose a race in the 60-meter dash, 60-meter hurdles or the 100-meter hurdles, and earned Big Ten Conference, NCAA and National championship titles. She held 11 Big Ten and Ohio State records and set a world record in the 60-yard hurdles. She was also a champion at the Millrose Games in 1980 and from 1982 to 1985, and was inducted into the Millrose Games Hall of Fame in 2001. She was unable to participate in the 1980 Summer Olympics due to the US boycott of the games. She did however receive one of 461 Congressional Gold Medals created especially for the spurned athletes. Hightower missed the 1984 Summer Olympics, finishing fourth in what looked like a four-way tie at the Olympic Trials. Kim Turner won the race in 13.12 seconds, with Benita Fitzgerald-Brown in second, Pam Page in third and Hightower in fourth, all running 13.13 seconds, in what was possibly the closest elite race in history. The photo of the finish was later used for instruction in the use of photo finish devices.

== Administration ==
Twenty-eight years later, as President of USATF, Hightower was part of the administrative committee formed to settle another controversial close finish, when Jeneba Tarmoh and Allyson Felix tied for the final qualifying spot in the 2012 Olympic Trials.

After retiring from competition, Hightower has held various positions with the USATF, including serving as assistant manager for Team USA at the 1996 Atlanta Olympic Games, head manager at the 1999 World Championships in Seville, Spain, chief of delegation for Team USA at the 2003 World Outdoor Championships in Paris, and women's team manager at the 2004 Athens Olympic Games. women's team manager at the 2004 Athens Olympic Games. She is currently the president and CEO of the Columbus Urban League. In addition, she has served in the Columbus Mayor's cabinet for Sports Development. In 2011, Hightower was discussed as a possibility for the USATF's CEO position until the board decided on Max Siegel.

== Post-athletic career ==
Following her retirement from competitive track and field in 1988, Hightower pursued leadership roles across government, education, and the nonprofit sector in Columbus, Ohio. She served as president of the Columbus Board of Education from 2001 to 2005, overseeing a district with an annual budget of approximately $1.3 billion. She subsequently joined Columbus College of Art & Design (CCAD) as vice president of institutional advancement beginning in 2004, where she directed a fundraising campaign that generated $12.5 million for capital improvements and endowment growth. She also served in the Columbus Mayor's cabinet for Sports Development.

== Columbus Urban League ==
In 2011, Hightower became the first woman appointed president and CEO of the Columbus Urban League (CUL), the city's oldest urban family advocacy organization and the seventh largest affiliate of the National Urban League. She is the organization's eighth president and CEO. Under her leadership, CUL expanded its programs to serve more than 7,000 people annually, offering initiatives focused on early childhood and adult education, workforce development, housing advocacy, financial literacy, and family stabilization. Notable achievements during her tenure include placing more than 500 chronically unemployed individuals in full-time jobs, ensuring nine out of ten Head Start graduates entered kindergarten reading-ready, and generating more than $900,000 in income for families through a summer youth employment program.

== Civic involvement ==
Hightower has served in numerous civic and advisory roles in the Central Ohio community. She has served on the Franklin County Community Corrections Planning Board, the Franklin County Criminal Justice Planning Board, and the Future Ready Columbus Community Engagement Council, where she served as chair. Additional roles have included membership on City Council President Zach Klein's Advisory Committee, the African American Leadership Academy Advisory Board, the Columbus Zoo Board of Directors, the Columbus School for Girls Board of Directors, and the Greater Columbus Sports Commission Advisory Board. She has also served as an advisory officer for US Bank. In December 2024, she was invited by the president of The Ohio State University to deliver the fall commencement address.

== Personal life ==
Hightower is the niece of Pro Football Hall of Famer Paul Warfield, who played for the Cleveland Browns and Miami Dolphins. She is the wife of former world cross country champion Ian Stewart. She is the mother of Cameron Baker, a graduate of Haverford College.

== Awards and recognition ==
- Kentucky High School Athletic Association records: 110-yard hurdles (14.3 seconds) and 60-yard hurdles (8.0 seconds)
- Four-time NCAA champion and four-time All-American, The Ohio State University
- World record, 60-yard hurdles
- Congressional Gold Medal, 1980 U.S. Olympic boycott athletes
- Silver medal, 1987 Pan American Games
- Millrose Games champion: 1980, 1982–1985
- Inducted, Ohio State University Athletics Hall of Fame, 1993
- Inducted, Millrose Games Hall of Fame, 2001 Inducted, YWCA Women of Achievement Honoree, 2005

== National titles ==
- Four-time U.S. 100 meter hurdles Champion (1980, 1981, 1982 and 1984)
- Five-time U.S. Indoor 60 meter hurdles Champion (1980, 1982, 1983, 1984 and 1986)
- Won 1980 USA Olympic Trials

== International competitions ==
Year	Competition	Venue	Position	Event	Notes
Representing United States
1980	Liberty Bell Classic	Philadelphia, United States	1st	100 m hurdles	13.08
1981	World Cup	Rome, Italy	4th	100 m hurdles	13.09
1985	World Indoor Games	Paris, France	4th	60 m hurdles	8.12
1987	World Indoor Championships	Indianapolis, United States	8th	60 m hurdles	8.26
1987	Pan American Games	Indianapolis, United States	2nd	100 m hurdles	12.82
1987	World Championships	Rome, Italy	11th (sf)	100 m hurdles	13.12
(sf) Indicates overall position in qualifying round
