= Athletics at the 1983 Summer Universiade =

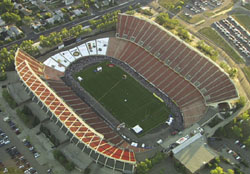
- Dates: 5–11 July 1983
- Host city: Edmonton, Canada
- Venue: Commonwealth Stadium
- Events: 40

The athletics tournament at the 1983 Summer Universiade took place in the Commonwealth Stadium in Edmonton, Alberta, Canada in July 1983, shortly before the inaugural World Championships in Helsinki, Finland. There was one new event, the women's marathon.

== Medal summary ==
=== Men's ===
Event	Gold		Silver		Bronze	
100 metres (wind: -0.8 m/s)	Chidi Imoh (NGR)	10.33	Desai Williams (CAN)	10.37	Sam Graddy (USA)	10.42
200 metres (wind: +0.6 m/s)	Innocent Egbunike (NGR)	20.42	Elliott Quow (USA)	20.46	Bernie Jackson (USA)	20.57
400 metres	Sunday Uti (NGR)	45.32	Viktor Markin (URS)	45.38	Sunder Nix (USA)	45.53
800 metres	Ryszard Ostrowski (POL)	1:46.29	Graham Williamson (GBR)	1:46.66	Mohamed Alouini (TUN)	1:46.75
1500 metres	Claudio Patrignani (ITA)	3:41.02	Andreas Baranski (FRG)	3:41.21	Geoff Turnbull (GBR)	3:41.24
5000 metres	Steve Harris (GBR)	13:46.99	Féthi Baccouche (TUN)	13:47.69	Shuichi Yoneshige (JPN)	13:48.13
10,000 metres	Shuichi Yoneshige (JPN)	28:55.37	Agapius Amo (TAN)	28:55.39	Féthi Baccouche (TUN)	28:55.76
Marathon	Alessio Faustini (ITA)	2:17:10	Giovanni d'Aleo (ITA)	2:17:20	Michael Spöttel (FRG)	2:18:12
110 metres hurdles (wind: +0.3 m/s)	Andrey Prokofyev (URS)	13.46	Willie Gault (USA)	13.49	Mark McKoy (CAN)	13.57
400 metres hurdles	Aleksandr Kharlov (URS)	49.41	Amadou Dia Bâ (SEN)	49.94	David Patrick (USA)	50.28
3000 metres steeplechase	Peter Daenens (BEL)	8:28.86	Farley Gerber (USA)	8:29.07	Shigeyuki Aikyo (JPN)	8:33.44
4 × 100 metres relay	United States (USA); Terry Scott; Sam Graddy; Ken Robinson; Willie Gault	38.50	Canada (CAN); Desai Williams; Sterling Hinds; Tony Sharpe; Ben Johnson	38.69	Soviet Union (URS); Andrey Prokofyev; Nikolay Sidorov; Vladimir Muravyov; Aleksandr Zolotaryev	39.04
4 × 400 metres relay	United States (USA); Sunder Nix; Eliot Tabron; Alonzo Babers; Cliff Wiley	3:01.24	Soviet Union (URS); Yevgeniy Lomtyev; Aleksandr Troshchilo; Sergey Kutsebo; Viktor Markin	3:01.58	France (FRA); Yann Quentrec; Hector Llatser; Pascal Chichignoud; Aldo Canti	3:04.89
20 kilometres walk	Guillaume Leblanc (CAN)	1:24:03	Maurizio Damilano (ITA)	1:24:21	Nikolay Matveyev (URS)	1:25:07
High jump	Igor Paklin (URS)	2.31 UR	Eddy Annys (BEL)	2.29	Clarence Saunders (BER)	2.26
Pole vault	Konstantin Volkov (URS)	5.65	Thierry Vigneron (FRA)	5.60	Jeff Ward (USA)	5.50
Long jump	Yusuf Alli (NGR)	8.21	Ralph Spry (USA)	7.91	Sergey Rodin (URS)	7.85
Triple jump	Ajayi Agbebaku (NGR)	17.26	Mike Conley (USA)	17.20w	John Herbert (GBR)	17.05
Shot put	Mike Carter (USA)	19.74	Zlatan Saračević (YUG)	19.66	Sergey Smirnov (URS)	19.61
Discus throw	Luis Delís (CUB)	69.46 UR	Dariusz Juzyszyn (POL)	63.32	Marco Bucci (ITA)	60.62
Hammer throw	Jüri Tamm (URS)	76.82	Robert Weir (GBR)	74.10	Yuriy Pastukhov (URS)	73.38
Javelin throw	Dainis Kūla (URS)	87.80	Helmut Schreiber (FRG)	84.12	Stanisław Górak (POL)	83.20
Decathlon	Dave Steen (CAN)	8205w	Herbert Peter (FRG)	8160w	Georg Werthner (AUT)	7905

=== Women's events ===
Event	Gold		Silver		Bronze	
100 metres (wind: +2.2 m/s)	Beverly Kinch (GBR)	11.13w	Randy Givens (USA)	11.16w	Angella Taylor (CAN)	11.17w
200 metres	Randy Givens (USA)	22.47	Marita Payne (CAN)	22.62	Grace Jackson (JAM)	22.69
400 metres	Mariya Pinigina (URS)	50.47	Molly Killingbeck (CAN)	51.94	Yelena Korban (URS)	52.07
800 metres	Irina Podyalovskaya (URS)	1:59.29	Robin Campbell (USA)	1:59.81	Doina Melinte (ROU)	1:59.93
1500 metres	Gabriella Dorio (ITA)	4:07.26	Doina Melinte (ROU)	4:07.34	Maria Radu (ROU)	4:08.41
3000 metres	Maria Radu (ROU)	9:04.32	Yelena Malychina (URS)	9:06.17	Lynn Williams (CAN)	9:07.74
Marathon	Sarah Rowell (GBR)	2:47:37 UR	Kathy Roberts (CAN)	2:52:47	Marjorie Kaput (USA)	2:54:03
100 metres hurdles (wind: +0.1 m/s)	Natalya Petrova (URS)	13.04	Yelena Biserova (URS)	13.07	Benita Fitzgerald (USA)	13.24
400 metres hurdles	Yekaterina Fesenko (URS)	54.97 UR	Yelena Filipishina (URS)	56.10	Gwen Wall (CAN)	56.10
4 × 100 metres relay	United States (USA); LaShon Nedd; Jackie Washington; Brenda Cliette; Randy Givens	42.82	Canada (CAN); Angella Taylor; Tanya Brothers; Marita Payne; Molly Killingbeck	43.21	Soviet Union (URS); Marina Romanova; Marina Molokova; Irina Olkhovnikova; Olga Antonova	44.20
4 × 400 metres relay	Soviet Union (URS); Larisa Krylova; Lyudmila Borisova; Yelena Didilenko; Mariya Pinigina	3:24.97 UR	Canada (CAN); Charmaine Crooks; Jillian Richardson; Molly Killingbeck; Marita Payne	3:25.26	United States (USA); Kelia Bolton; Easter Gabriel; Sharon Dabney; Arlise Emerson	3:34.64
High jump	Tamara Bykova (URS)	1.98 UR	Silvia Costa (CUB)	1.98 UR	Maryse Ewanjé-Epée (FRA)	1.92
Long jump	Anişoara Cuşmir (ROU)	7.06w	Svetlana Zorina (URS)	6.81	Valy Ionescu (ROU)	6.56w
Shot put	Natalya Lisovskaya (URS)	20.46	Claudia Losch (FRG)	18.81	Natalya Akhrimenko (URS)	18.67
Discus throw	Florența Crăciunescu (ROU)	64.56	Natalya Akhrimenko (URS)	62.62	Lyubov Urakova (URS)	58.28
Javelin throw	Beate Peters (FRG)	66.86	Fausta Quintavalla (ITA)	63.06	Mayra Vila (CUB)	62.34
Heptathlon	Yekaterina Smirnova (URS)	6350	Sabine Everts (FRG)	6291	Judy Livermore (GBR)	6184

== Medal table ==
Rank	Nation	Gold	Silver	Bronze	Total
1	Soviet Union (URS)	14	7	9	30
2	United States (USA)	5	7	8	20
3	Nigeria (NGR)	5	0	0	5
4	Italy (ITA)	3	3	1	7
5	Great Britain (GBR)	3	2	3	8
6	Romania (ROU)	3	1	3	7
7	Canada (CAN)	2	7	4	13
8	West Germany (FRG)	1	5	1	7
9	Cuba (CUB)	1	1	1	3
9	Poland (POL)	1	1	1	3
11	Belgium (BEL)	1	1	0	2
12	Japan (JPN)	1	0	2	3
13	France (FRA)	0	1	2	3
13	Tunisia (TUN)	0	1	2	3
15	Senegal (SEN)	0	1	0	1
15	Tanzania (TAN)	0	1	0	1
15	Yugoslavia (YUG)	0	1	0	1
18	Austria (AUT)	0	0	1	1
18	Bermuda (BER)	0	0	1	1
18	Jamaica (JAM)	0	0	1	1
Totals (20 entries)		40	40	40	120

== See also ==
- 1983 in the sport of athletics
- FISU World University Games
- University and college sport
