= Vera Komisova =

Russian hurdler

Personal information
- Born: Vera Yakovlevna Nikitina; June 11, 1953 (age 73) Leningrad, RSFSR, Soviet Union
- Height: 168 cm (5 ft 6 in)
- Weight: 58 kg (128 lb)
Medal record
Women's Athletics
Representing the Soviet Union
Olympic Games
| Gold medal – first place | 1980 Moscow | 100 m hurdles |
| Silver medal – second place | 1980 Moscow | 4 × 100 m relay |
Summer Universiade
| Gold medal – first place | 1979 Mexico City | 4 x 100 m relay |
| Bronze medal – third place | 1979 Mexico City | 100 m hurdles |

Vera Yakovlevna Komisova, née Nikitina (Russian: Вера Яковлевна Комисова bzw. Никитина, born 11 June 1953) is a retired Russian-Soviet hurdler. Her career highlight came in 1980 when she won the Olympic 100 m hurdles gold medal.
