= Shirley Strong =

British former athlete (born 1958)

Personal information
- Nationality: British (English)
- Born: 18 November 1958 (age 68) Cuddington, Northwich, England

Sport
- Sport: Athletics
- Event: hurdles
- Club: Stretford AC
Medal record
Women's athletics
Representing Great Britain
Olympic Games
Silver medal – second place	1984 Los Angeles	100 m hurdles
Representing England
Commonwealth Games
Gold medal – first place	1982 Brisbane	100m hurdles
Silver medal – second place	1978 Edmonton	100m hurdles

Shirley Elaine Strong (married name Holloway, born 18 November 1958) is a British former athlete who competed mainly in the 100 metres hurdles. In this event, she won a silver medal at the 1984 Olympic Games in Los Angeles, a gold medal at the 1982 Commonwealth Games, and a silver medal at the 1978 Commonwealth Games. She also held the British record from 1980 to 1988.

== Personal life ==
Strong was born in Cuddington, Cheshire and remained in the village throughout her career. She has two daughters and lives in Holmes Chapel, Cheshire.

She studied at Northwich Grammar School For Girls, now known as The County High School, Leftwich.

== Career ==
She was a member of Stretford athletic club.

She was twice English and twice British Schoolgirls 100 hurdles champion 1974 and 1975.

Her first senior success came in 1977 with second placings in the 100 metres hurdles at both the 1977 WAAA Championships and the UK Athletics Championships. She place second again in 1978 at both championships.

Strong's first major championship was representing England at the 1978 Commonwealth Games, in Edmonton, Canada, where she won the silver medal.

She became the British 100 metres hurdles champion after winning the British WAAA Championships title at the 1979 WAAA Championships and retained the title in 1980, 1981, 1982, 1983, in a national record time of 12.95 sec and 1984.

Representing England at the 1982 Commonwealth Games in Brisbane Australia, Strong won the gold medal.

She was Northern Ireland 100 hurdles champion in 1983. Later the same year she was fifth at the 1983 World Championships with a wind-assisted time of 12.78 seconds. This was Great Britain's highest placing in the event until Tiffany Porter finished fourth in 2011.

With the eastern European countries absent through a boycott at the 1984 Olympics in Los Angeles, Strong went into the 100 metres hurdles event as one of the favourites. In the final she finished second, 0.04 seconds behind gold-medallist Benita Fitzgerald-Brown of the United States.

In the years following Los Angeles, Strong was frequently troubled by problems with her achilles tendon and failed to qualify for the 1986 Commonwealth Games. She earned selection for the European Championships later that year, but withdrew from the team. After competing in the 1987 indoor season she retired from athletics.

== Popularity ==
At the height of her career Strong was among the most popular athletes in the UK among a public who regarded her as "one of us", and even admitted to having an occasional cigarette after a race.

== Personal bests ==
- 60 metres hurdles – 8.11sec Cosford, UK 11 March 1984
- 100 metres hurdles – 12.87sec Zurich, SUI 24 August 1983 – British record 1983–88

Note: Strong twice ran 12.78sec, first in Brisbane (8 October 1982 ) with a following wind of +4.5, then in Helsinki (13 August 1983) with a following wind of +2.4. Any performance achieved with a following wind of more than +2.0 m/s is regarded as wind-assisted and does not count for record purposes.

== Achievements ==
- 6 Times AAAs (of England) National 100 m Hurdles Champion 1979, 80, 81, 82, 83, 84 ( 2nd in 77, 78 )

- 3 Times UK National 100 m Hurdles Champion 1979, 80, 83 ( 2nd in 77, 78 )

- 7 Times North England 100 m Hurdles champion 1976, 1978-81, 83 and 86. Also one 100m in 1981.)

Year	Competition	Venue	Position	Event	Notes
Representing England
1978	Commonwealth Games	Edmonton, Canada	2nd	100m hurdles	13.08w
1982	Commonwealth Games	Brisbane, Australia	1st	100m hurdles	12.78w
Representing Great Britain
1980	Olympic Games	Moscow, Russia	semi-final	100 m hurdles	13.12
1981	European Cup	Zagreb, Yugoslavia	4th	100m hurdles	13.21
1982	European Championships	Athens, Greece	semi-final	100m hurdles	13.23
1983	World Championships	Helsinki, Finland	5th	100m hurdles	12.78w
1983	European Cup	London, UK	5th	100m hurdles	13.37
1984	Olympic Games	Los Angeles, USA	2nd	100m hurdles	12.88
