= Karen Nelson (athlete) =

Canadian hurdler

Personal information
- Nationality: Canadian
- Born: 3 December 1963 (age 62) Saint Andrew Parish, Jamaica

Sport
- Sport: Track and field
- Event: 100 metres hurdles
Medal record
Representing Canada
Pan American Games
Bronze medal – third place	1983 Caracas	4x100m relay

Karen Nelson (born 3 December 1963) is a Canadian former hurdler. She competed in the women's 100 metres hurdles at the 1984 Summer Olympics.

Nelson competed for the Texas Longhorns women's track and field team in the NCAA.
