= Glynis Nunn =

Australian heptathlete

Glynis Nunn née Saunders
Personal information
- Nationality: Australian
- Born: 4 December 1960 (age 65) Toowoomba, Queensland, Australia
- Height: 168 cm (5 ft 6 in)
- Weight: 58 kg (128 lb)

Sport
- Sport: Athletics
- Event: hurdles
Medal record
Representing Australia
Women's Athletics
Olympic Games
Gold medal – first place	1984 Los Angeles	Heptathlon
Commonwealth Games
Gold medal – first place	1982 Brisbane	Heptathlon
Bronze medal – third place	1986 Edinburgh	100m Hurdles

Glynis Leanne Nunn OAM (née Saunders; 4 December 1960) is a former Australian heptathlete, the first Olympic champion in the event.

== Biography ==
Born in Toowoomba, Queensland, she began competing in athletics at age 9, when she was a student at Toowoomba South State School. She starred in several events, and was thus a natural competitor in the pentathlon (which was replaced by the heptathlon in 1981). In 1978, she qualified for the Commonwealth Games, but could not compete because of an injury.

By the time of the 1982 Commonwealth Games held in Brisbane, she had married decathlete Chris Nunn, and that year the couple moved to Adelaide in South Australia where Chris was studying for a physical education degree at the South Australian College of Advanced Education. In the first heptathlon competition at the Games, she upset the English favourite and took the title. At the inaugural World Championships a year later, she was placed 7th.

Because of the 1984 Summer Olympics boycott, Nunn was one of the medal candidates for the Olympic title, too. The competition was incredibly close, with five athletes fighting for the medals. After the competition, there was confusion about who had won, but when the smoke cleared, Nunn had scored 6390 points, five more than runner-up Jackie Joyner-Kersee. In addition to her gold medal, Nunn was also placed fifth in the 100 m hurdles event, and seventh in the long jump.

After the Olympics, Nunn abandoned the heptathlon, and switched to hurdling. Nunn won the British WAAA Championships title at the 1985 WAAA Championships. She was hampered by many injuries, but won a bronze medal in the high hurdles event at the 1986 Commonwealth Games. She quit sports in 1990.

== Recognition ==
In 1985, Nunn received a Medal of the Order of Australia and was inducted into the Sport Australia Hall of Fame. She received an Australian Sports Medal in 2000.
