= Marie-Noëlle Savigny =

French hurdler

Personal information
- Nationality: French
- Born: 11 October 1957 (age 68) Cusset
- Years active: 1980s
- Height: 1.67 m (5 ft 6 in)

Sport
- Event: 100 m hurdles
- Club: CA Le Pontet

Marie-Noëlle Savigny (born 11 October 1957) is a French former athlete who specialized in the 100 meters hurdles.

== Biography ==
A bronze medalist 100 meters hurdles at the 1983 Mediterranean Games, Savigny placed sixth at the 1984 Olympics, at Los Angeles, in a time of 13.28s.

=== Prize list ===
International Awards
Date	Competition	Location	Result	Event	Performance
1983	Mediterranean Games	Casablanca	3rd	100 m hurdles	13.44s
1984	Olympic Games	Los Angeles	6th	100 m hurdles	13.28s

=== Records ===
Personal Bests
Event	Performance	Location	Date
100 m hurdles	13.13s		1984
