= Laurence Lebeau =

French hurdler (born 1957)

Personal information
- Nationality: French
- Born: 4 June 1957 (age 69) Longeville-lès-Metz
- Years active: 1978-1980
- Height: 1.73 m (5 ft 8 in)

Sport
- Event: 100 m hurdles
- Club: Racing Club de France

Laurence Lebeau (married name is Monclar) (born 4 June 1957 at Longeville-lès-Metz) is a former French athlete, who specialized in the 100 meters hurdles.

== Biography ==
In 1975, Laurence Lebeau became the first French junior champion of Europe in any sport, by winning 100 hurdles during the European Junior Championships, at Athens.

She won three titles of champion of France: two in the 100 meters hurdles in 1978 and 1980, and one Indoors in the 60m hurdles in 1980. She twice improved the French record of the 100 meters hurdles, bringing it to 13.20s then to 13.03s in 1980. She also held the record for the France 50 m hurdles(Indoors) running 6.98s (1981).

She participated in the 1980 Olympics, at Moscow, and reached the semifinals of the 100m hurdles.

== Private life ==
She is the wife of Jacques Monclar, basketball player and coach with whom she had three children, Julian and Benjamin, also basketball players.

=== Prize list ===
- French Outdoor Championships in Athletics :
  - winner 100m hurdles 1978 and 1980.
- French Indoors Championships in Athletics:
  - winner of the 60m hurdles in 1980.

=== Records ===
Personal Bests
Event	Performance	Location	Date
100 m hurdles	13.03s		1980
