= Kerstin Knabe =

German hurdler

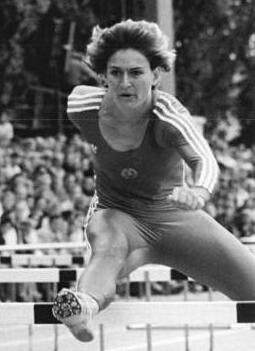
- Knabe in 1988

Medal record

Women's athletics

Representing East Germany

European Championships
| Bronze medal – third place | 1982 Athens | 100 m hurdles |

Kerstin Knabe (née Claus, born 7 July 1959 in Oschatz, Bezirk Leipzig) is a German former athlete who ran for East Germany. She made her Olympic debut at the 1980 Games, placing 4th in the 100 m hurdles. Knabe did not participate in the 1984 Olympic Games in Los Angeles because of a boycott of those Games by East Germany.

== Achievements ==
| Year | Tournament | Venue | Result | Extra |
|---|---|---|---|---|
| 1980 | Olympic Games | Moscow, USSR | 4th | 100 m hurdles |
| 1982 | European Indoor Championships | Milan, Italy | 1st | 60 m hurdles |
| 1982 | European Championships | Athens, Greece | 3rd | 100 m hurdles |
| 1983 | European Indoor Championships | Budapest, Hungary | 2nd | 60 m hurdles |
| 1983 | World Championships | Helsinki, Finland | 2nd | 100 m hurdles |
| 1986 | European Indoor Championships | Madrid, Spain | 3rd | 60 m hurdles |
| 1986 | European Championships | Stuttgart, Germany | 5th | 100 m hurdles |
| 1988 | Olympic Games | Seoul, South Korea | semi-final | 100 m hurdles |
