= Lorna Boothe =

English hurdler (born 1954)

Lorna Boothe MBE
Personal information
- Nationality: British/Jamaican
- Born: 5 December 1954 (age 71) Kingston, Jamaica
- Height: 163 cm (5 ft 4 in)
- Weight: 52 kg (115 lb)

Sport
- Sport: Athletics
- Event: hurdles
- Club: Mitcham AC; Hounslow AC
Medal record
Women's athletics
Representing England
Commonwealth Games
Gold medal – first place	1978 Edmonton	100 m hurdles
Silver medal – second place	1982 Brisbane	100 m hurdles

Lorna Marie Boothe MBE (born 5 December 1954) is a British/Jamaican former 100 metres hurdler who competed at two Olympic Games. She is also a former British record holder in the event and became a senior athletics administrator.

== Biography ==
Boothe finished second behind Liz Damman in the 100 metres hurdles event at the 1975 WAAA Championships.

At the 1976 Olympics Games in Montreal, Boothe represented Great Britain in the women's 100 metres hurdles.

Booth became the British 100 metres hurdles champion after winning the British WAAA Championships title at the 1977 WAAA Championships and then the following year represented England at the 1978 Commonwealth Games in Edmonton, Canada and wo a gold medal.

She competed in the 1980 Summer Olympic Games in Moscow and was the silver medallist in the event in 1982.

She went on to become the athletics GB team manager for 9 years and was the Senior Team Manager for the 2000 Summer Olympics in Sydney. She has worked for the International Association of Athletics Federations (IAAF) and was involved in setting up the IAAF Academy and World Class Coaches Club and the lottery funded World Class Performance Programme. She is a member of English Sports Council Racial Equality Advisory Group and helped set up the Sporting Equals programme with the Commission for Racial Equality. She coaches hurdlers and sprinters at junior level and is on the Board of the Olympians Committee UK. She was appointed a Member of the Order of the British Empire (MBE) in the 2019 New Year Honours for services to Sports Coaching and Administration.

== Personal life ==
Her son Tremayne Gilling is a sprinter with a personal best time of 10.25 seconds over 100 metres.

== International competitions ==
All results regarding 100 metres hurdles

Year	Competition	Venue	Position	Notes
Representing Great Britain / England
1976	Olympic Games	Montreal, Canada	13th (sf)	13.73
1978	Commonwealth Games	Edmonton, Canada	1st	12.98w
1980	Olympic Games	Moscow, Soviet Union	18th (h)	13.86
1982	European Championships	Athens, Greece	11th (sf)	13.44
1982	Commonwealth Games	Brisbane, Australia	2nd	12.90w
1983	World Championships	Helsinki, Finland	18th (qf)	13.29
(#) Indicates overall position in qualifying heats (h) quarterfinals (qf) or semifinals (sf) (w) = wind-assisted
