= Michèle Chardonnet =

French hurdler (born 1956)

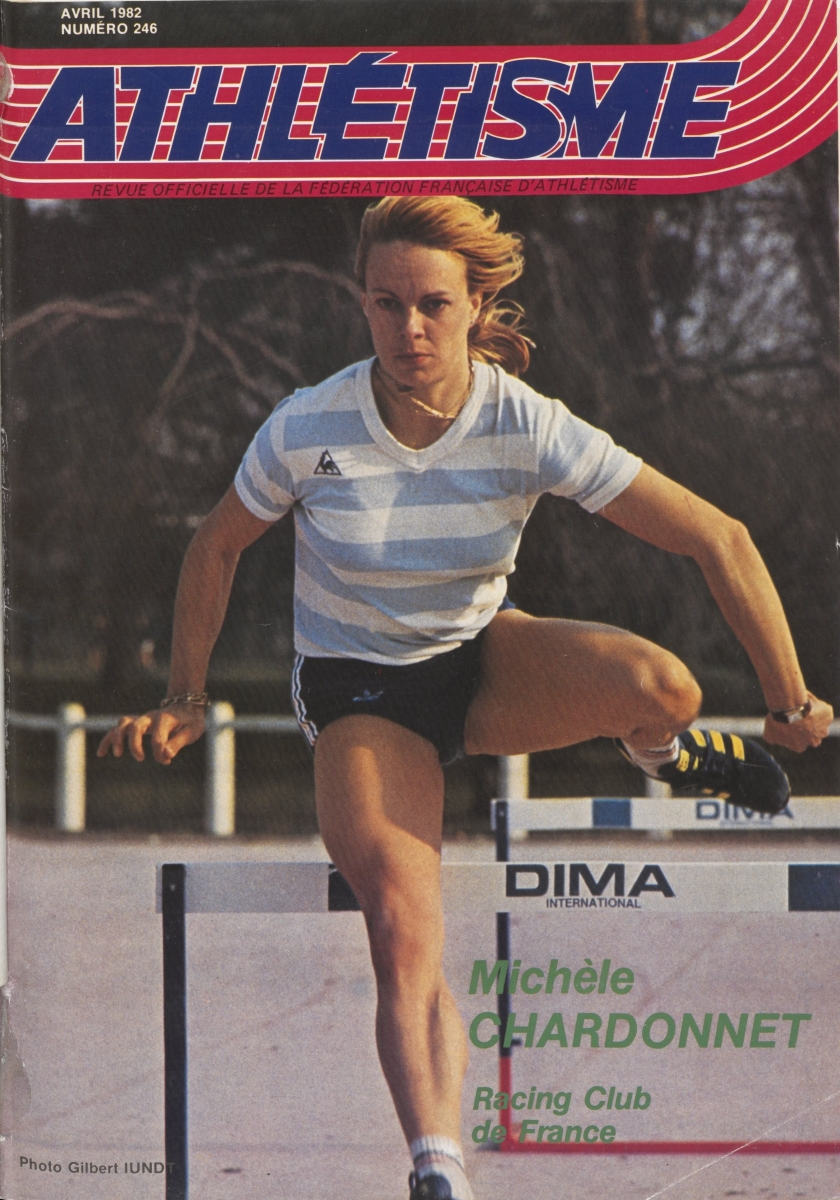
- Chardonnet in 1982

Personal information
- Born: 27 October 1956 (age 69) Toulon, France
Medal record
Women's athletics
Representing France
Olympic Games
Bronze medal – third place	1984 Los Angeles	100m hurdles
Mediterranean Games
Gold medal – first place	1983 Casablanca	100m hurdles

Michèle Chardonnet (born 27 October 1956) is a French athlete, who competed mainly in the 100 metre hurdles.

She competed for France in the 1984 Summer Olympics held in Los Angeles in the 100 metre hurdles where she won the bronze medal jointly with Kim Turner.

== Prize list ==
- 29 selections for French National Athletic teams, from 1978 to 1984
- French record holder Indoors for 60 m hurdles in 1983, 8.13s
- French record holder Indoors for 50 m hurdles in 1981, 6.98s
- (bronze) Bronze medal, 1984 Olympic Games—100m hurdles
- (gold) 1983 Mediterranean Games 100m hurdles
- (gold) French National Champion 100 m hurdles in 1981 and 1983
- (gold) French National Champion 60 m hurdles in 1979, 1981, 1982 and 1983
