= Benita Fitzgerald-Brown =

American hurdler (born 1961)

Benita Fitzgerald Mosley
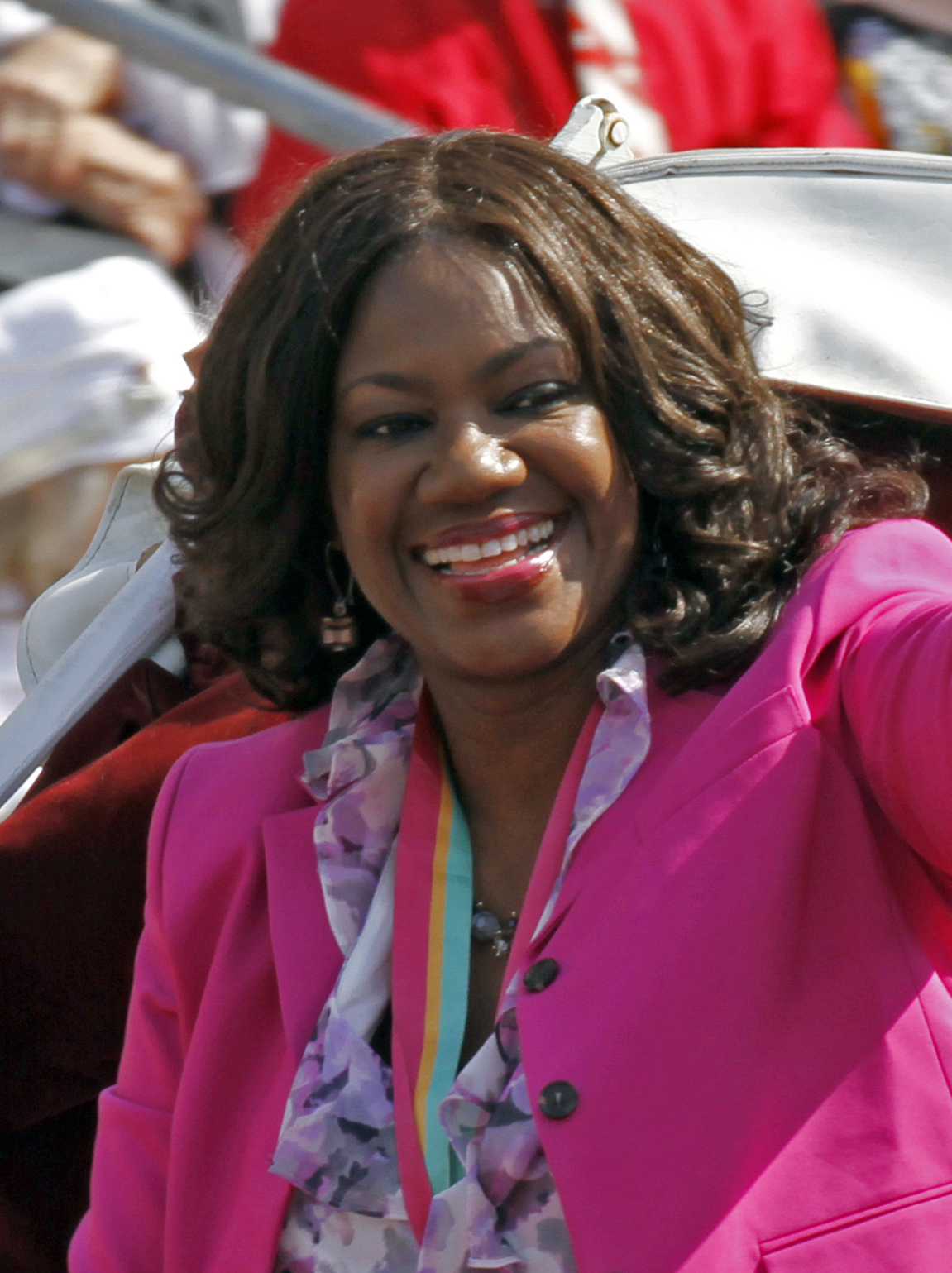

Personal information
- Born: July 6, 1961 (age 65) Warrenton, Virginia, U.S.
Medal record
Women's athletics
Representing the United States
Olympic Games
Gold medal – first place	1984 Los Angeles	100 metres hurdles
Pan American Games
Gold medal – first place	1983 Caracas	100 metres hurdles
Olympic Boycott Games
Silver medal – second place	1980 Philadelphia	100 m hurdles
Summer Universiade
Gold medal – first place	1981 Bucharest	4 x 100 m relay
Bronze medal – third place	1983 Edmonton	100 metres hurdles

Benita Fitzgerald Mosley, née Benita Fitzgerald, formerly Benita Fitzgerald-Brown, (July 6, 1961) is a retired American athlete, who mainly competed in the women's 100 metres hurdles event. Since February 2026, she has been chief executive officer of the U.S. Center for SafeSport.

== Early life ==
A native of Warrenton, Virginia, she grew up in nearby Dale City where at an early age, she began to excel in athletics and academics. After graduating from Gar-Field High School, she attended the University of Tennessee on a full athletic scholarship, where she earned a B.S. in industrial engineering. While at Tennessee, she was a fifteen-time All-American and won 4 NCAA titles, including three 100-meter outdoor hurdles championships.

== Olympics ==
Benita Fitzgerald qualified for the 1980 U.S. Olympic track and field team but did not compete due to the U.S. Olympic Committee's boycott of the 1980 Summer Olympics in Moscow, Russia. She was one of 461 athletes to receive a Congressional Gold Medal instead.

She competed for the United States in the 1984 Summer Olympics held in Los Angeles, where she won the Olympic Gold medal in a time of 12.84 seconds, beating favorite Shirley Strong by 0.04 seconds. Fitzgerald is only the second U.S. woman, after Babe Didrikson, and the first African-American woman, to win a gold medal in the 100-meter hurdles. She was also an alternate for the 1988 United States Olympic team.

In 1996, Fitzgerald was honored as one of eight U.S. Olympians to carry the Olympic flag into the stadium during the Opening Ceremony of the Centennial Olympic Games in Atlanta. Fitzgerald has been inducted into numerous halls of fame, including the Virginia High School Hall of Fame, Virginia Sports Hall of Fame, and the University of Tennessee's Lady Volunteers Hall of Fame.

== Honors ==
There is a road named after Fitzgerald in her childhood hometown of Dale City, Virginia. The street can be found off Dale Blvd. between I-95 and Minnieville Rd. Fitzgerald Elementary School, named after her mother Fannie, is located on the road.

Fitzgerald was inducted into the USTFCCCA Collegiate Athlete Hall of Fame in 2024.
