= 1975 European Cup Final (athletics) =

These are the full results of the 1975 European Cup Final in athletics which was held at the Stade de l'Ouest on 16 and 17 August 1975 in Nice, France.

== Team standings ==
Men
Pos.	Nation	Points
1	East Germany	112
2	Soviet Union	109
3	Poland	100
4	Great Britain	83
5	West Germany	83
6	Finland	83
7	France	80
8	Italy	68

Women
Pos.	Nation	Points
1	East Germany	97
2	Soviet Union	77
3	West Germany	64
4	Poland	57
5	Romania	52
6	Bulgaria	47
7	Great Britain	39
8	France	35

== Men's results ==
=== 100 metres ===
16 August
Wind: -0.7 m/s

Rank	Lane	Name	Nationality	Time	Notes	Points
1	2	Valeriy Borzov	Soviet Union	10.40		8
2	6	Pietro Mennea	Italy	10.40		7
3	1	Alexander Thieme	East Germany	10.53		6
4	7	Gilles Échevin	France	10.58		5
5	4	Antti Rajamäki	Finland	10.59		4
6	5	Klaus Ehl	West Germany	10.61		3
7	8	Ainsley Bennett	Great Britain	10.63		2
8	3	Zenon Licznerski	Poland	10.72		1

=== 200 metres ===
17 August
Wind: -0.9 m/s

Rank	Lane	Name	Nationality	Time	Notes	Points
1	7	Pietro Mennea	Italy	20.42	CR	8
2	3	Valeriy Borzov	Soviet Union	20.61		7
3	5	Antti Rajamäki	Finland	20.97		6
4	8	Lucien Sainte-Rose	France	21.02		5
5	2	Hans-Jürgen Bombach	East Germany	21.18		4
6	4	Jerzy Pietrzyk	Poland	21.22		3
7	1	Ainsley Bennett	Great Britain	21.29		2
8	6	Klaus Ehl	West Germany	21.42		1

=== 400 metres ===
16 August

Rank	Name	Nationality	Time	Notes	Points
1	David Jenkins	Great Britain	45.52		8
2	Markku Kukkoaho	Finland	45.56		7
3	Jerzy Pietrzyk	Poland	45.67		6
4	Franz-Peter Hofmeister	West Germany	46.40		5
5	Günther Arnold	East Germany	46.67		4
6	Francis Demarthon	France	46.77		3
7	Semyon Kocher	Soviet Union	46.99		2
8	Flavio Borghi	Italy	47.71		1

=== 800 metres ===
17 August

Rank	Name	Nationality	Time	Notes	Points
1	Steve Ovett	Great Britain	1:46.6		8
2	Dieter Fromm	East Germany	1:47.4		7
3	Vladimir Ponomaryov	Soviet Union	1:47.6		6
4	Markku Taskinen	Finland	1:47.7		5
5	Marian Gęsicki	Poland	1:48.2		4
6	Roqui Sanchez	France	1:48.4		3
7	Willi Wülbeck	West Germany	1:48.6		2
8	Vittorio Fontanella	Italy	1:52.1		1

=== 1500 metres ===
16 August

Rank	Name	Nationality	Time	Notes	Points
1	Thomas Wessinghage	West Germany	3:39.1		8
2	Bronisław Malinowski	Poland	3:39.8		7
3	Frank Clement	Great Britain	3:40.1		6
4	Vittorio Fontanella	Italy	3:40.2		5
5	Jürgen Straub	East Germany	3:40.6		4
6	Anatoliy Mamontov	Soviet Union	3:44.7		3
7	Francis Gonzalez	France	3:45.0		2
8	Markku Laine	Finland	3:48.4		1

=== 5000 metres ===
17 August

Rank	Name	Nationality	Time	Notes	Points
1	Brendan Foster	Great Britain	13:36.2	CR	8
2	Enn Sellik	Soviet Union	13:42.8		7
3	Manfred Kuschmann	East Germany	13:44.8		6
4	Henryk Szordykowski	Poland	13:49.6		5
5	Lasse Virén	Finland	13:49.8		4
6	Jean-Paul Gomez	France	13:50.2		3
7	Luigi Zarcone	Italy	13:53.2		2
8	Klaus-Peter Hildenbrand	West Germany	13:57.0		1

=== 10,000 metres ===
16 August

Rank	Name	Nationality	Time	Notes	Points
1	Karl-Heinz Leiteritz	East Germany	28:37.2		8
2	Dave Black	Great Britain	28:42.2		7
3	Giuseppe Cindolo	Italy	28:48.0		6
4	Edward Mleczko	Poland	28:53.4		5
5	Noël Tijou	France	28:56.6		4
6	Pekka Päivärinta	Finland	29:01.4		3
7	Gerd Frähmcke	West Germany	29:02.4		2
8	Vladimir Merkushin	Soviet Union	29:06.8		1

=== 110 metres hurdles ===
17 August
Wind: -1.4 m/s

Rank	Name	Nationality	Time	Notes	Points
1	Guy Drut	France	13.57	CR	8
2	Thomas Munkelt	East Germany	13.78		7
3	Viktor Myasnikov	Soviet Union	13.88		6
4	Berwyn Price	Great Britain	13.90		5
5	Jan Pusty	Poland	13.91		4
6	Giuseppe Buttari	Italy	14.03		3
7	Dieter Gebhard	West Germany	14.17		2
8	Raimo Alanen	Finland	14.38		1

=== 400 metres hurdles ===
16 August

Rank	Name	Nationality	Time	Notes	Points
1	Alan Pascoe	Great Britain	49.00	CR	8
2	Jean-Claude Nallet	France	49.38		7
3	Jerzy Hewelt	Poland	50.59		6
4	Jochen Mayer	East Germany	50.71		5
5	Raimo Alanen	Finland	51.00		4
6	Dieter Friedrich	West Germany	51.94		3
7	Giorgio Ballati	Italy	52.31		2
	Yevgeniy Gavrilenko	Soviet Union	DNF		0

=== 3000 metres steeplechase ===
17 August

Rank	Name	Nationality	Time	Notes	Points
1	Michael Karst	West Germany	8:16.4		8
2	Frank Baumgartl	East Germany	8:17.6	NR	7
3	Bronisław Malinowski	Poland	8:18.6		6
4	Franco Fava	Italy	8:20.4		5
5	Aleksandr Velichko	Soviet Union	8:27.4		4
6	Tapio Kantanen	Finland	8:28.6		3
7	Jean-Paul Villain	France	8:42.8		2
8	Tony Staynings	Great Britain	8:43.4		1

=== 4 × 100 metres relay ===
16 August

Rank	Lane	Nation	Athletes	Time	Note	Points
1	7	East Germany	Hans-Joachim Zenk, Thomas Munkelt, Hans-Jürgen Bombach, Alexander Thieme	39.98	CR	8
2	8	Soviet Union	Aleksandr Kornelyuk, Nikolay Kolesnikov, Juris Silovs, Valeriy Borzov	39.00		7
3	4	Italy	Vincenzo Guerini, Luciano Caravani, Luigi Benedetti, Pietro Mennea	39.32		6
4	3	West Germany	Klaus Ehl, Reinhard Borchert, Dieter Steinmann, Manfred Ommer	39.59		5
5	1	Poland	Zenon Nowosz, Jan Alończyk, Bogdan Grzejszczak, Zenon Licznerski	39.60		4
6	5	France	Dominique Chauvelot, René Metz, Lucien Sainte-Rose, Gilles Échevin	39.84		3
7	6	Great Britain	David Roberts, Richard Kennedy, Ainsley Bennett, Terry Collins	40.17		2
8	2	Finland	Antti Rajamäki, Raimo Vilén, Markku Juhola, Raimo Räty	40.38		1

=== 4 × 400 metres relay ===
17 August

Rank	Nation	Athletes	Time	Note	Points
1	Great Britain	Glen Cohen, Jim Aukett, Bill Hartley, David Jenkins	3:02.9	8	
2	West Germany	Franz-Peter Hofmeister, Horst-Rüdiger Schlöske, Lothar Krieg, Bernd Herrmann	3:03.4		7
3	Finland	Juhani Tiihonen, Ossi Karttunen, Markku Taskinen, Markku Kukkoaho	3:04.1		6
4	France	Francis Demarthon, Daniel Velasques, Francis Kerbiriou, Jean-Claude Nallet	3:06.3		5
5	Poland	Jan Werner, Janusz Koziarz, Zbigniew Jaremski, Jerzy Pietrzyk	3:06.8		4
6	Soviet Union	Pavel Kobzan, Valeriy Yurchenko, Viktor Myasnikov, Semyon Kocher	3:07.1		3
7	East Germany	Benno Stops, Günter Arnold, Dietmar Krug, Siegmar Lathan	3:09.2		2
8	Italy	Flavio Borghi, Bruno Magnani, Pasqualino Abeti, Alfonso Di Guida	3:09.7		1

=== High jump ===
16 August

Rank	Name	Nationality	Result	Notes	Points
1	Aleksandr Grigoryev	Soviet Union	2.24	CR	8
2	Paul Poaniewa	France	2.22		7
3	Rolf Beilschmidt	East Germany	2.20		6
4	Enzo Dal Forno	Italy	2.17		5
5	Jacek Wszoła	Poland	2.11		4
6	Wolfgang Killing	West Germany	2.11		3
7	Asko Pesonen	Finland	2.08		2
8	Mike Butterfield	Great Britain	2.08		1

=== Pole vault ===
17 August

Rank	Name	Nationality	Result	Notes	Points
1	Władysław Kozakiewicz	Poland	5.45		8
2	Antti Kalliomäki	Finland	5.40		7
3	Yury Isakov	Soviet Union	5.40		6
4	Patrick Abada	France	5.35		5
5	Günther Lohre	West Germany	5.30		4
6	Renato Dionisi	Italy	5.25		3
7	Peter Wieneck	East Germany	5.20		2
8	Mike Bull	Great Britain	4.60		1

=== Long jump ===
16 August

Rank	Name	Nationality	Result	Notes	Points
1	Grzegorz Cybulski	Poland	8.15	CR	8
2	Valeriy Pidluzhny	Soviet Union	7.92		7
3	Peter Rieger	East Germany	7.70		6
4	Heikki Mattila	Finland	7.67		5
5	Ulrich Köwring	West Germany	7.64		4
6	Jean-François Bonhème	France	7.51		3
7	Domenico Fontanella	Italy	7.36		2
8	Alan Lerwill	Great Britain	7.33		1

=== Triple jump ===
17 August

Rank	Name	Nationality	#1	#2	#3	#4	#5	#6	Result	Notes	Points
1	Viktor Saneyev	Soviet Union	16.30	16.59	16.97	x	16.79	x	16.97		8
2	Christian Valétudie	France	16.40	16.70	16.45	16.37	16.21	16.35	16.70	NR	7
3	Andrzej Sontag	Poland	16.17	x	16.16	16.32	x	x	16.32		6
4	Pentti Kuukasjärvi	Finland	16.23	16.17	16.14	16.06	16.17	15.85	16.23		5
5	Jörg Drehmel	East Germany	15.90	16.11	16.01	x	16.22	x	16.22		4
6	Ludwig Franz	West Germany	16.02	15.75	x	15.20	15.52	15.40	16.02		3
7	Maurizio Siega	Italy	15.26	15.29	15.84	x	15.93	15.84	15.93		2
8	David Johnson	Great Britain	15.41	x	x	15.65	15.57	15.42	15.65		1

=== Shot put ===
16 August

Rank	Name	Nationality	#1	#2	#3	#4	#5	#6	Result	Notes	Points
1	Geoff Capes	Great Britain	20.17	19.97	20.75	19.82	20.29	20.14	20.75		8
2	Heinz-Joachim Rothenburg	East Germany	20.33	20.20	20.04	20.03	20.19	x	20.33		7
3	Valeriy Voykin	Soviet Union	19.47	19.07	x	x	x	x	19.47		6
4	Mieczysław Bręczewski	Poland	18.82	19.06	x	x	18.99	18.63	19.06		5
5	Ralf Reichenbach	West Germany	18.98	x	19.03	x	18.88	18.41	19.03		4
6	Yves Brouzet	France	x	x	18.68	18.75	18.89	18.76	18.89		3
7	Matti Yrjölä	Finland	17.76	x	18.53	18.56	18.54	18.19	18.56		2
8	Angelo Groppelli	Italy	17.34	17.95	x	x	17.76	17.53	17.95		1

=== Discus throw ===
17 August

Rank	Name	Nationality	#1	#2	#3	#4	#5	#6	Result	Notes	Points
1	Wolfgang Schmidt	East Germany	60.12	x	63.16	x	x	62.10	63.16		8
2	Pentti Kahma	Finland	60.38	61.32	61.52	62.70	59.12	57.36	62.70		7
3	Hein-Direck Neu	West Germany	57.00	59.58	x	62.20	x	x	62.20		6
4	Viktor Penzikov	Soviet Union	x	57.68	58.92	60.68	56.70	57.80	60.68		5
5	Armando De Vincentiis	Italy	53.34	58.94	60.00	x	60.46	60.22	60.46		4
6	Stanisław Wołodko	Poland	56.16	59.32	x	58.28	57.28	x	59.32		3
7	Bill Tancred	Great Britain	57.18	56.12	54.50	x	55.92	x	57.18		2
8	Michel Chabrier	France	x	55.68	54.38	x	x	55.82	55.82		1

=== Hammer throw ===
16 August

Rank	Name	Nationality	#1	#2	#3	#4	#5	#6	Result	Notes	Points
1	Karl-Hans Riehm	West Germany	73.76	76.30	77.50	77.28	x	x	77.50	CR	8
2	Valentin Dmitrenko	Soviet Union	71.12	75.80	77.22	76.32	72.94	x	77.22		7
3	Jochen Sachse	East Germany	75.94	76.04	x	x	73.20	x	76.04		6
4	Szymon Jagliński	Poland	69.28	69.74	x	68.78	70.56	68.88	70.56		5
5	Harri Huhtala	Finland	66.00	x	67.30	67.88	69.34	69.48	69.48		4
6	Jacques Accambray	France	66.14	68.80	66.64	69.00	67.16	67.20	69.00		3
7	Paul Dickenson	Great Britain	67.12	66.90	67.40	x	x	65.20	67.40		2
8	Giampaolo Urlando	Italy							65.86		1

=== Javelin throw ===
17 August – Old model

Rank	Name	Nationality	#1	#2	#3	#4	#5	#6	Result	Notes	Points
1	Nikolay Grebnyev	Soviet Union	84.30	77.78	76.86	x	82.34		84.30		8
2	Piotr Bielczyk	Poland	74.00	72.46	73.08	78.48	75.84	82.00	82.00		7
3	Seppo Hovinen	Finland	79.70	x	80.80	81.02	78.42	x	81.02		6
4	Detlef Michel	East Germany	79.94	76.60	74.32	x	x	79.10	79.94		5
5	Klaus Wolfermann	West Germany	79.74	78.12	79.90	76.96	x	x	79.90		4
6	Renzo Cramerotti	Italy	69.04	71.04	72.80	69.86	76.42	x	76.42		3
7	Dave Travis	Great Britain	74.60	73.60	74.68	69.46	67.20	75.76	75.76		2
8	Serge Leroy	France	62.50	70.80	x	69.88	x	74.68	74.68		1

== Women's results ==
=== 100 metres ===
16 August
Wind: -0.5 m/s

Rank	Name	Nationality	Time	Notes	Points
1	Renate Stecher	East Germany	11.29		8
2	Andrea Lynch	Great Britain	11.37		7
3	Irena Szewińska	Poland	11.41		6
4	Annegret Richter	West Germany	11.50		5
5	Lyudmila Maslakova	Soviet Union	11.50		4
6	Sylviane Telliez	France	11.63		3
7	Liliana Panayotova	Bulgaria	11.77		2
8	Viorica Enescu	Romania	13.08		1

=== 200 metres ===
17 August
Wind: -0.8 m/s

Rank	Name	Nationality	Time	Notes	Points
1	Renate Stecher	East Germany	22.63	CR	8
2	Irena Szewińska	Poland	22.84		7
3	Annegret Richter	West Germany	23.28		6
4	Lyudmila Maslakova	Soviet Union	23.49		5
5	Liliana Panayotova	Bulgaria	23.68		4
6	Sylviane Telliez	France	23.74		3
7	Helen Golden	Great Britain	23.99		2
8	Lăcrămioara Diaconiuc	Romania	24.95		1

=== 400 metres ===
16 August

Rank	Name	Nationality	Time	Notes	Points
1	Irena Szewińska	Poland	50.50	CR	8
2	Ellen Streidt	East Germany	50.61		7
3	Donna Murray	Great Britain	51.30		6
4	Rita Wilden	West Germany	51.75		5
5	Nadezhda Ilyina	Soviet Union	51.96		4
6	Lăcrămioara Diaconiuc	Romania	53.74		3
7	Patricia Darbonville	France	54.14		2
8	Zdravka Trifonova	Bulgaria	54.39		1

=== 800 metres ===
16 August

Rank	Name	Nationality	Time	Notes	Points
1	Mariana Suman	Romania	2:00.6		8
2	Ulrike Klapezynski	East Germany	2:00.7		7
3	Lilyana Tomova	Bulgaria	2:01.1		6
4	Nina Morgunova	Soviet Union	2:01.2		5
5	Elżbieta Katolik	Poland	2:02.3		4
6	Marie-Françoise Dubois	France	2:02.4		3
7	Brigitte Kraus	West Germany	2:04.3		2
8	Angela Creamer	Great Britain	2:07.6		1

=== 1500 metres ===
17 August

Rank	Name	Nationality	Time	Notes	Points
1	Waltraud Strotzer	East Germany	4:08.0		8
2	Natalia Andrei	Romania	4:08.4	NR	7
3	Tatyana Kazankina	Soviet Union	4:08.9		6
4	Rositsa Pekhlivanova	Bulgaria	4:09.0		5
5	Ellen Wellmann	West Germany	4:09.5		4
6	Bronisława Ludwichowska	Poland	4:12.9	NR	3
7	Joan Allison	Great Britain	4:15.9		2
8	Marie-Françoise Dubois	France	4:16.0		1

=== 100 metres hurdles ===
17 August
Wind: -0.3 m/s

Rank	Name	Nationality	Time	Notes	Points
1	Annelie Ehrhardt	East Germany	12.83	CR	8
2	Grażyna Rabsztyn	Poland	12.85		7
3	Natalya Lebedeva	Soviet Union	12.93		6
4	Marlies Koschinski	West Germany	13.42		5
5	Nadine Prévost	France	13.50		4
6	Penka Sokolova	Bulgaria	13.65		3
7	Viorica Enescu	Romania	13.66		2
8	Lorna Boothe	Great Britain	13.72		1

=== 4 × 100 metres relay ===
16 August

Rank	Nation	Athletes	Time	Note	Points
1	East Germany	Monika Meyer, Renate Stecher, Carla Bodendorf, Sybille Priebsch	42.81	CR	8
2	Soviet Union	Nadezhda Besfamilnaya, Lyudmila Maslakova, Svetlana Belova, Vera Anisimova	43.19		7
3	West Germany	Inge Helten, Annegret Kroniger, Annegret Richter, Brigitte Wilkes	43.58		6
4	Poland	Ewa Długołęcka, Aniela Szubert, Barbara Bakulin, Irena Szewińska	43.82		5
5	Great Britain	Wendy Clarke, Andrea Lynch, Helen Golden, Sonia Lannaman	43.92		4
6	France	Nadine Goletto, Catherine Delachanal, Nicole Pani, Annie Alizé	44.87		3
7	Bulgaria	Liliana Panayotova, Zdravka Shipoklieva, Yordanka Yankova, Elena Stefanova	45.06		2
8	Romania	Mariana Suman, Lăcrămioara Diaconiuc, Ibolya Slavic, Dorina Catineanu	46.61		1

=== 4 × 400 metres relay ===
17 August

Rank	Nation	Athletes	Time	Note	Points
1	East Germany	Brigitte Rohde, Gisela Anton, Rita Kühne, Ellen Streidt	3:24.0	CR	8
2	Great Britain	Jannette Roscoe, Gladys Taylor, Verona Elder, Donna Murray	3:26.6	NR	7
3	Soviet Union	Inta Klimovicha, Larisa Golovanova, Ingrida Barkane, Nadezhda Ilyina	3:27.0		6
4	West Germany	Dagmar Jost, Rita Wilden, Erika Weinstein, Elke Barth	3:27.4		5
5	Romania	Ibolya Slavic, Alexandrina Badescu, Lăcrămioara Diaconiuc, Mariana Suman	3:32.8		4
6	Bulgaria	Yordanka Filipova, Nikolina Shtereva, Svetla Zlateva, Liliana Tomova	3:33.8		3
7	Poland	Barbara Bakulin, Genowefa Nowaczyk, Danuta Piecyk, Zofia Zwolińska	3:33.8		2
8	France	Dominique Forest, Catherine Nicolas, Daniθlle Lairloup, Patricia Darbonville	3:35.8		1

=== High jump ===
17 August

Rank	Name	Nationality	Result	Notes	Points	
1	Rosemarie Ackermann	East Germany	1.94		8	
2	Ulrike Meyfarth	West Germany	1.92	NR		7
3	Virginia Ioan	Romania	1.86		6	
4	Marie-Christine Debourse	France	1.82		5	
5	Galina Filatova	Soviet Union	1.79		4	
6	Yordanka Blagoeva	Bulgaria	1.76		3	
7	Danuta Hołowińska	Poland	1.73		2	
8	Rosaline Few	Great Britain	1.73		1	

=== Long jump ===
17 August

Rank	Name	Nationality	#1	#2	#3	#4	#5	#6	Result	Notes	Points
1	Lidiya Alfeyeva	Soviet Union	6.60	6.64	6.76	6.40	x	6.18	6.76	NR	8
2	Christa Striezel	West Germany	6.56	6.43	6.08	6.15	6.12	6.06	6.56		7
3	Jacqueline Curtet	France	6.36	6.33	6.20	6.19	x	6.21	6.36		6
4	Alina Gheorghiu	Romania	6.07	6.35	6.25	6.18	6.16	6.03	6.35		5
5	Angela Voigt	East Germany	x	x	x	6.35	x	x	6.35		4
6	Myra Nimmo	Great Britain	6.13	6.16	5.95	6.02	5.98	6.19	6.19		3
7	Anna Włodarczyk	Poland	x	x	x	5.95	x	5.99	5.99		2
8	Liliana Panayotova	Bulgaria	5.45	5.48	5.48	x	x	x	5.48		1

=== Shot put ===
17 August

Rank	Name	Nationality	#1	#2	#3	#4	#5	#6	Result	Notes	Points	
1	Marianne Adam	East Germany	20.87	20.76	21.06	19.98	20.86	21.32	21.32	CR	8	
2	Esfir Krachevskaya	Soviet Union	x	19.12	20.38	x	20.49	20.53	20.53		7	
3	Ivanka Khristova	Bulgaria	20.22	20.22	20.24	x	x	19.91	20.24		6	
4	Valentina Cioltan	Romania	17.22	17.37	17.23	17.67	18.49	x	18.49		5	
5	Eva Wilms	West Germany	17.62	17.78	x	x	17.96	17.92	17.96		4	
6	Ludwika Chewińska	Poland	17.46	x	17.50	17.49	17.64	x	17.64		3	
7	Léone Bertimon	France	x	15.10	15.57	15.31	x	15.13	15.57	15.57		2
8	Branda Bedford	Great Britain	x	14.76	14.47	14.15	14.26	14.76		1		

=== Discus throw ===
16 August

Rank	Name	Nationality	#1	#2	#3	#4	#5	#6	Result	Notes	Points
1	Faina Melnik	Soviet Union	x	62.32	66.54	x	63.24	64.54	66.54		8
2	Gabriele Hinzmann	East Germany	x	62.64	64.72	64.12	x	55.94	64.72		7
3	Argentina Menis	Romania	62.88	63.60	63.52	61.48	62.28	62.94	63.60		6
4	Maria Vergova	Bulgaria	61.08	62.32	61.72	60.66	55.60	63.14	63.14		5
5	Liesel Westermann	West Germany	x	54.68	57.62	56.94	x	55.00	57.62		4
6	Danuta Rosani	Poland	x	54.46	x	52.58	52.42	55.74	55.74		3
7	Meg Ritchie	Great Britain	49.68	x	x	51.46	47.72	51.80	51.80		2
8	Noëlle Jarry	France	48.84	48.72	45.82	x	x	x	48.84		1

=== Javelin throw ===
16 August – Old model

Rank	Name	Nationality	#1	#2	#3	#4	#5	#6	Result	Notes	Points
1	Ruth Fuchs	East Germany	64.80	60.00	60.16	51.92	56.46	60.94	64.80		8
2	Svetlana Babich	Soviet Union	x	56.74	55.66	58.80	58.40	61.88	61.88		7
3	Lyutvian Mollova	Bulgaria	56.82	58.36	55.56	57.14	57.36	57.60	58.36		6
4	Felicja Kinder	Poland	58.18	51.30	52.14	54.88	48.52	50.02	58.18		5
5	Ameli Koloska	West Germany	53.82	55.70	x	x	53.16	54.92	55.70		4
6	Ioana Pecec	Romania	53.70	55.50	53.18	52.08	53.14	54.70	55.50		3
7	Tessa Sanderson	Great Britain	47.86	48.20	45.84	48.72	47.90	47.56	48.72		2
8	Annie Boclé	France	44.96	46.64	45.74	47.64	46.78	46.78	47.64		1
