= 1973 European Cup Final (athletics) =

These are the full results of the 1973 European Cup Final in athletics which was held at the Meadowbank Stadium on 8 and 9 September 1973 in Edinburgh, United Kingdom.

== Team standings ==
Men
Pos.	Nation	Points
1	Soviet Union	82.5
2	East Germany	78.5
3	West Germany	76
4	Great Britain	70.5
5	Finland	65
6	France	45

Women
Pos.	Nation	Points
1	East Germany	72
2	Soviet Union	52
3	Bulgaria	50
4	West Germany	36
	Great Britain	36
6	Romania	27

== Men's results ==
=== 100 metres ===
8 September
Wind: +1.5 m/s

Rank	Lane	Name	Nationality	Time	Notes	Points
1	3	Siegfried Schenke	East Germany	10.26	CR	6
2	2	Aleksandr Kornelyuk	Soviet Union	10.34		5
3	4	Jobst Hirscht	West Germany	10.47		4
4	5	Raimo Vilén	Finland	10.49		3
5	7	Don Halliday	Great Britain	10.52		2
6	6	Lucien Rechal	France	10.76		1

=== 200 metres ===
9 September
Wind: -3.3 m/s

Rank	Lane	Name	Nationality	Time	Notes	Points
1	7	Chris Monk	Great Britain	21.00		6
2	3	Hans-Jürgen Bombach	East Germany	21.00		5
3	5	Ossi Karttunen	Finland	21.24		4
4	6	Joseph Arame	France	21.26		3
5	4	Franz-Peter Hofmeister	West Germany	21.31		2
6	2	Juris Silovs	Soviet Union	21.55		1

=== 400 metres ===
8 September

Rank	Name	Nationality	Time	Notes	Points
1	Karl Honz	West Germany	45.20		6
2	David Jenkins	Great Britain	46.00		5
3	Ossi Karttunen	Finland	46.26		4
4	Andreas Scheibe	East Germany	46.37		3
5	Francis Demarthon	France	46.75		2
6	Semyon Kocher	Soviet Union	47.32		1

=== 800 metres ===
9 September

Rank	Lane	Name	Nationality	Time	Notes	Points
1	3	Andy Carter	Great Britain	1:46.44	CR	6
2	4	Yevhen Arzhanov	Soviet Union	1:46.70		5
3	5	Dieter Fromm	East Germany	1:46.71		4
4	2	Roqui Sanchez	France	1:48.17		3
5	7	Markku Taskinen	Finland	1:48.96		2
6	6	Josef Schmid	West Germany	1:49.07		1

=== 1500 metres ===
8 September

Rank	Name	Nationality	Time	Notes	Points
1	Frank Clement	Great Britain	3:40.79		6
2	Paul-Heinz Wellmann	West Germany	3:41.85		5
3	Klaus-Peter Justus	East Germany	3:42.61		4
4	Pekka Päivärinta	Finland	3:43.03		3
5	Volodymyr Panteley	Soviet Union	3:43.10		2
6	Jacky Boxberger	France	3:46.16		1

=== 5000 metres ===
9 September

Rank	Name	Nationality	Time	Notes	Points
1	Brendan Foster	Great Britain	13:54.65		6
2	Manfred Kuschmann	East Germany	13:55.31		5
3	Harald Norpoth	West Germany	13:57.66		4
4	Mikhail Zhelobovskiy	Soviet Union	14:08.45		3
5	Lasse Virén	Finland	14:18.23		2
6	Noël Tijou	France	14:19.44		1

=== 10,000 metres ===
8 September

Rank	Name	Nationality	Time	Notes	Points
1	Nikolay Sviridov	Soviet Union	28:44.08		6
2	Detlef Uhlemann	West Germany	28:44.22		5
3	Karl-Heinz Leiteritz	East Germany	28:44.36		4
4	Pierre Liardet	France	29:15.15		3
5	Tony Simmons	Great Britain	29:23.56		2
6	Risto Ala-Korpi	Finland	30:28.02		1

=== 110 metres hurdles ===
8 September
Wind: +0.8 m/s

Rank	Name	Nationality	Time	Notes	Points
1	Guy Drut	France	13.70		6
2	Anatoliy Moshiashvili	Soviet Union	13.76		5
3	Thomas Munkelt	East Germany	13.77		4
4	Günther Nickel	West Germany	14.01		3
5	Ari Salin	Finland	14.46		2
6	Berwyn Price	Great Britain	25.20		1

=== 400 metres hurdles ===
9 September

Rank	Lane	Name	Nationality	Time	Notes	Points
1	4	Alan Pascoe	Great Britain	50.07	CR	6
2	5	Dmitriy Stukalov	Soviet Union	50.61		5
3	6	Jürgen Läser	East Germany	51.09		4
4	7	Werner Reibert	West Germany	51.13		3
5	2	Ari Salin	Finland	51.73		2
6	3	Jean-Pierre Corval	France	51.94		1

=== 3000 metres steeplechase ===
9 September

Rank	Name	Nationality	Time	Notes	Points
1	Tapio Kantanen	Finland	8:28.45		6
2	Willi Maier	West Germany	8:29.76		5
3	Leonid Savelyev	Soviet Union	8:30.93		4
4	Gérard Buchheit	France	8:33.05		3
5	Steve Hollings	Great Britain	8:36.63		2
6	Waldemar Cierpinski	East Germany	8:38.60		1

=== 4 × 100 metres relay ===
8 September

Rank	Nation	Athletes	Time	Note	Points
1	East Germany	Manfred Kokot, Michael Droese, Hans-Jürgen Bombach, Klaus-Dieter Kurrat	39.5		6
2	West Germany	Jobst Hirscht, Klaus Ehl, Manfred Ommer, Franz-Peter Hofmeister	39.5		5
3	Great Britain	Brian Green, Chris Monk, Ian Matthews, Les Piggott	39.9		4
4	France	Bruno Cherrier, Lucien Rechal, Charles Ducasse, Joseph Arame	40.1		3
5	Finland	Antti Rajamäki, Raimo Vilén, Juhani Jaakola, Markku Perttula	41.6		2
	Soviet Union	Aleksandr Kornelyuk, Vladimir Atamas, Juris Silovs, Boris Izmestyev	DNF		1

=== 4 × 400 metres relay ===
9 September

Rank	Nation	Athletes	Time	Note	Points
1	West Germany	Hermann Köhler, Horst Rόdiger Schloske, Bernd Herrmann, Karl Honz	3:04.25	CR	6
2	Soviet Union	Valeriy Yurchenko, Leonid Korolyev, Valeriy Yudin, Semyon Kocher	3:05.11		5
3	Great Britain	John Wilson, Alan Pascoe, Joe Chivers, David Jenkins	3:06.27		4
4	East Germany	Jürgen Ludewig, Jürgen Utikal, Benno Stops, Andreas Scheibe	3:06.63		3
5	Finland	Stig Lönnqvist, Raimo Nieminen, Juhani Jaakkola, Ossi Karttunen	3:12.54		2
	France	Francis Demarthon, Daniel Velasques, Lionel Malingre, Francis Kerbiriou	DQ		1

=== High jump ===
8 September

Rank	Name	Nationality	Result	Notes	Points
1	Valentin Gavrilov	Soviet Union	2.15		6
2	Asko Pesonen	Finland	2.13		5
3	Paul Poaniewa	France	2.09		4
4	Stephan Junge	East Germany	2.07		3
5	Walter Boller	West Germany	2.07		2
6	Mike Campbell	Great Britain	2.02		1

=== Pole vault ===
9 September

Rank	Name	Nationality	4.40	4.70	4.80	4.90	5.00	5.05	5.10	5.20	5.25	5.30	Result	Notes	Points
1	Yuriy Isakov	Soviet Union											5.30		6
2	Antti Kalliomäki	Finland											5.30		5
3	Reinhard Kuretzky	West Germany											5.20		4
4	Mike Bull	Great Britain											5.20		3
5	François Tracanelli	France											5.10		2
6	Wolfgang Reinhard	East Germany											5.05		1

=== Long jump ===
8 September

Rank	Name	Nationality	#1	#2	#3	#4	#5	#6	Result	Notes	Points
1	Valeriy Pidluzhny	Soviet Union	7.96w	8.00w	8.20w	x	x	7.92	8.20w		6
2	Hans Baumgartner	West Germany	7.93	x	8.12	8.00w	6.09	7.80	8.12		5
3	Max Klauß	East Germany	7.75	7.91w	x	7.97	x	8.03	8.03		4
4	Alan Lerwill	Great Britain	x	x	x	x	x	7.95w	7.95w		3
5	Jacques Rousseau	France	7.70	7.87	x	7.64	7.78w	7.55	7.87		2
6	Tapani Taavitsainen	Finland	7.36	x	7.40w	7.48	7.52w	7.39	7.52w		1

=== Triple jump ===
9 September

Rank	Name	Nationality	#1	#2	#3	#4	#5	#6	Result	Notes	Points
1	Viktor Saneyev	Soviet Union	16.78	16.65w	x	x	16.90w	x	16.90w		6
2	Jörg Drehmel	East Germany	16.38w	16.60w	x	16.89w	x	x	16.89w		5
3	Esa Rinne	Finland	16.18w	16.11w	15.80w	x	x	x	16.18w		4
4	Michael Sauer	West Germany	15.59w	15.86w	15.67w	x	14.12	x	15.86w		3
5	Bernard Lamitié	France	15.78w	15.83w	15.78w	x	15.62w	15.64	15.83w		2
6	Willie Clark	Great Britain	15.64w	x	15.08w	x	x	15.11w	15.64w		1

=== Shot put ===
8 September

Rank	Name	Nationality	#1	#2	#3	#4	#5	#6	Result	Notes	Points
1	Hartmut Briesenick	East Germany	20.80	20.90	20.95	20.53	20.88	20.67	20.95		6
2	Reijo Ståhlberg	Finland	20.27	x	20.01	20.15	x	19.75	20.27		5
3	Geoff Capes	Great Britain	19.60	x	19.40	19.80	19.58	x	19.80		4
4	Valeriy Voykin	Soviet Union	19.54	19.77	19.53	x	x	x	19.77		3
5	Ferdinand Schladen	West Germany	18.40	18.56	18.88	18.43	18.86	18.79	18.88		2
6	Yves Brouzet	France	18.61	18.84	x	18.88	18.55	17.85	18.88		1

=== Discus throw ===
9 September

Rank	Name	Nationality	#1	#2	#3	#4	#5	#6	Result	Notes	Points
1	Pentti Kahma	Finland	58.62	61.94	63.10	60.56	56.88	x	63.10		6
2	Siegfried Pachale	East Germany	x	55.30	60.02	59.96	60.48	60.06	60.48		5
3	Bill Tancred	Great Britain	x	55.80	55.12	56.76	54.72	59.06	59.06		4
4	Viktor Zhurba	Soviet Union	54.40	57.76	x	56.22	x	53.96	57.76		3
5	Hein-Direck Neu	West Germany	54.16	56.08	x	56.16	x	53.92	56.16		2
6	Frédéric Piette	France	53.80	55.14	x	53.04	x	x	55.14		1

=== Hammer throw ===
8 September

Rank	Name	Nationality	#1	#2	#3	#4	#5	#6	Result	Notes	Points
1	Anatoliy Bondarchuk	Soviet Union	74.08	72.82	70.98	72.34	72.26	70.72	74.08		6
2	Reinhard Theimer	East Germany	62.76	66.90	69.18	72.06	71.18	71.34	72.06		5
3	Jacques Accambray	France	69.70	71.90	68.22	68.86	69.28	68.14	71.90	NR	4
4	Uwe Beyer	West Germany	68.84	66.30	70.20	71.50	70.16	71.10	71.50		3
5	Barry Williams	Great Britain	x	69.52	71.26	x	x	x	71.26	NR	2
6	Heikki Kangas	Finland	67.26	68.58	67.80	x	66.62	67.16	68.58		1

=== Javelin throw ===
8 September – Old model

Rank	Name	Nationality	#1	#2	#3	#4	#5	#6	Result	Notes	Points
1	Klaus Wolfermann	West Germany	x	78.86	90.68	x	x	x	90.68		6
2	Jānis Lūsis	Soviet Union	81.16	84.48	x	x	x	x	84.48		5
3	Hannu Siitonen	Finland	83.14	x	84.08	81.06	x	x	84.08		4
4	Dave Travis	Great Britain	78.78	80.32	77.32	x	70.98	x	80.32		3
5	Lolesio Tuita	France	69.98	70.86	x	75.98	x	75.44	75.98		2
6	Wolfgang Hanisch	East Germany	74.24	x	x	x	68.90	x	74.24		1

== Women's results ==
=== 100 metres ===
? September
Wind: +1.3 m/s

Rank	Lane	Name	Nationality	Time	Notes	Points
1	6	Renate Stecher	East Germany	11.25		6
2	4	Annegret Richter	West Germany	11.32		5
3	7	Marina Sidorova	Soviet Union	11.40		4
4	3	Ivanka Valkova	Bulgaria	11.49		3
5	5	Andrea Lynch	Great Britain	11.57		2
6	2	Mariana Condovici	Romania	11.92		1

=== 200 metres ===
? September
Wind: +0.8 m/s

Rank	Name	Nationality	Time	Notes	Points
1	Renate Stecher	East Germany	22.81		6
2	Marina Sidorova	Soviet Union	22.93		5
3	Helen Golden	Great Britain	23.14		4
4	Annegret Kroniger	West Germany	23.39		3
5	Ivanka Valkova	Bulgaria	23.91		2
6	Mariana Condovici	Romania	24.34		1

=== 400 metres ===
? September

Rank	Lane	Name	Nationality	Time	Notes	Points
1	7	Monika Zehrt	East Germany	51.75	CR	6
2	4	Lilyana Tomova	Bulgaria	52.33		5
3	2	Nadezhda Kolesnikova	Soviet Union	52.35		4
4	5	Rita Wilden	West Germany	53.57		3
5	6	Verona Bernard	Great Britain	54.07		2
6	3	Alexandra Badescu	Romania	55.86		1

=== 800 metres ===
? September

Rank	Name	Nationality	Time	Notes	Points
1	Gunhild Hoffmeister	East Germany	1:58.94	CR, NR	6
2	Svetla Zlateva	Bulgaria	1:59.05		5
3	Nijolė Razienė	Soviet Union	2:02.17		4
4	Hildegard Falck	West Germany	2:04.29		3
5	Rosemary Wright	Great Britain	2:04.91		2
6	Natalia Andrei	Romania	2:07.51		1

=== 1500 metres ===
? September

Rank	Name	Nationality	Time	Notes	Points
1	Tonka Petrova	Bulgaria	4:09.02	CR	6
2	Karin Krebs	East Germany	4:09.37		5
3	Lyudmila Bragina	Soviet Union	4:10.11		4
4	Joan Allison	Great Britain	4:12.17		3
5	Ellen Tittel	West Germany	4:19.72		2
6	Ileana Silai	Romania	4:21.55		1

=== 100 metres hurdles ===
? September
Wind: 0.0 m/s

Rank	Name	Nationality	Time	Notes	Points
1	Anneliese Ehrhardt	East Germany	12.95	CR	6
2	Judy Vernon	Great Britain	13.34		5
3	Natalya Lebedeva	Soviet Union	13.62		4
4	Sasha Varbanova	Bulgaria	13.84		3
5	Uta Nolte	West Germany	13.89		2
6	Marioara Lazar	Romania	15.08		1

=== 4 × 100 metres relay ===
? September

Rank	Nation	Athletes	Time	Note	Points
1	East Germany	Petra Kandarr, Renate Stecher, Christina Heinich, Doris Selmigkeit	42.95	CR	6
2	West Germany	Elfgard Schittenhelm, Inge Helten, Annegret Richter, Annegret Kroniger	43.68		5
3	Great Britain	Elizabeth Sutherland, Helen Golden, Judy Vernon, Andrea Lynch	44.78		4
4	Bulgaria	Sofka Popova, Ivanka Valkova, Liliana Panayotova, Zdravka Shipoklieva	45.03		3
5	Soviet Union	Nadezhda Besfamilnaya, Lyudmila Maslakova, Marina Sidorova, Galina Mitrokhina	45.13		2
6	Romania	Carmen Ene, Marioara Lazar, Laura Ratz, Mariana Condovici	46.67		1

=== 4 × 400 metres relay ===
? September

Rank	Nation	Athletes	Time	Note	Points
1	East Germany	Waltraud Dietsch, Renate Siebach, Monika Zehrt, Rita Kühne	3:28.66	CR	6
2	Soviet Union	Nina Zyuskova, Ingrīda Barkāne, Natalya Kulichkova, Nadezhda Kolesnikova	3:30.57		5
3	Bulgaria	Zdravka Trifonova, Liliana Tomova, Stefka Yordanova, Svetla Zlateva	3:31.89		4
4	Great Britain	Dawn Webster, Janette Roscoe, Rosemary Wright, Verona Bernard	3:34.81		3
5	West Germany	Erika Weinstein, Christel Frese, Dagmar Jost, Rita Wilden	3:35.20		2
6	Romania	Natalia Andrei, Mariana Suman, Niculina Lungu, Alexandrina Badescu	3:48.03		1

=== High jump ===
? September

Rank	Name	Nationality	1.64	1.67	1.70	1.73	1.76	1.78	1.80	1.82	1.84	1.88	Result	Notes	Points
1	Yordanka Blagoeva	Bulgaria	–	–	o	–	o	–	o	–	xxo	xxx	1.84		6
2	Rita Kirst	Soviet Union	–	–	–	xxo	o	o	o	xo	xxx		1.82		5
3	Virginia Ioan	Romania	–	o	o	–	o	–	o	xxx			1.80		4
4	Barbara Lawton	Great Britain	–	o	o	o	o	o	o	xxx			1.80		3
5	Galina Filatova	Soviet Union	o	o	o	o	o	o	o	xxx			1.80		2
6	Renate Gärtner	West Germany	o	o	o	o	xo	xxx					1.76		1

=== Long jump ===
? September

Rank	Name	Nationality	#1	#2	#3	#4	#5	#6	Result	Notes	Points
1	Angela Schmalfeld	East Germany	6.63w	x	x	x	6.53	x	6.63w		6
2	Viorica Viscopoleanu	Romania	6.39	6.15	6.37	6.01	6.37	6.31	6.39		5
3	Ruth Martin-Jones	Great Britain	6.30w	6.00	6.09	x	5.83	x	6.30w		4
4	Margarita Treinite	Soviet Union	x	6.10	6.28	x	6.07	6.04	6.28		3
5	Gunhild Hetzel	West Germany	6.03	6.16	5.54	5.95	5.71	5.74	6.16		2
6	Nedyalka Angelova	Bulgaria	6.07	4.52	5.63	5.98	6.03	5.93	6.07		1

=== Shot put ===
? September

Rank	Name	Nationality	#1	#2	#3	#4	#5	#6	Result	Notes	Points
1	Nadezhda Chizhova	Soviet Union	20.77	x	20.39	20.57	x	20.0	20.77	CR	6
2	Ivanka Khristova	Bulgaria	19.23	18.98	18.75	19.06	18.58	19.1	19.23		5
3	Marita Lange	East Germany	18.49	x	18.81	18.78	x	x	18.81		4
4	Valentina Cioltan	Romania	17.52	x	16.54	x	x	16.6	17.52		3
5	Brenda Bedford	Great Britain	14.78	14.65	x	14.06	14.64	14.85	14.85		2
6	Brigitte Berendonk	West Germany	x	14.51	14.63	14.68	x	14.6	14.69		1

=== Discus throw ===
? September

Rank	Name	Nationality	#1	#2	#3	#4	#5	#6	Result	Notes	Points
1	Faina Melnik	Soviet Union	67.06	x	x	69.48	x	64.78	69.48	WR	6
2	Argentina Menis	Romania	62.66	x	64.16	x	62.52	62.32	64.16		5
3	Gabriele Hinzmann	East Germany	59.54	62.92	62.48	62.04	61.76	63.76	63.76		4
4	Liesel Westermann	West Germany	x	54.02	53.02	x	58.74	x	58.74		3
5	Svetla Bozhkova	Bulgaria	57.96	58.34	58.66	57.64	57.86	55.86	58.66		2
6	Rosemary Payne	Great Britain	53.00	49.94	54.58	51.48	49.08	53.24	54.58		1

=== Javelin throw ===
? September – Old model

Rank	Name	Nationality	#1	#2	#3	#4	#5	#6	Result	Notes	Points
1	Ruth Fuchs	East Germany	66.10	x	x	60.68	x	x	66.10	WR	6
2	Lyutviyan Mollova	Bulgaria	51.70	x	48.94	56.28	60.30	58.04	60.30		5
3	Ameli Koloska	West Germany	54.38	54.46	x	55.46	x	x	55.46		4
4	Eva Zorgo	Romania	x	x	x	x	53.60	x	53.60		3
5	Elvīra Ozoliņa	Soviet Union	49.80	53.20	x	x	x	x	53.20		2
6	Sharon Corbett	Great Britain	45.34	46.30	47.22	52.22	48.72	45.20	52.22		1
