= 1974 European Athletics Championships – Men's 200 metres =

Men's 200 metres at the 1974 European Athletics Championships
- Venue: Stadio Olimpico
- Location: Rome
- Dates: 4 September (heats & semi-finals); 6 September (final)
- Competitors: 28 from 14 nations
- Winning time: 20.60

Medalists
gold medal	Pietro Mennea	Italy
silver medal	Manfred Ommer	West Germany
bronze medal	Hans-Jürgen Bombach	East Germany

The men's 200 metres at the 1974 European Athletics Championships was held in Rome, Italy, at Stadio Olimpico on 4 and 6 September 1974.

== Participation ==
According to an unofficial count, 28 athletes from 14 countries participated in the event.

- Bulgaria (1)
- Czechoslovakia (3)
- East Germany (2)
- Finland (1)
- France (3)
- Great Britain (3)
- Hungary (1)
- Italy (3)
- Netherlands (1)
- Poland (3)
- Spain (2)
- Sweden (1)
- Switzerland (1)
- West Germany (3)

== Results ==
=== Heats ===
4 September

==== Heat 1 ====
Rank	Name	Nationality	Time	Notes
1	Bruno Cherrier	France	20.96	Q
2	Luigi Benedetti	Italy	21.11	Q
3	Raymond Heerenveen	Netherlands	21.24	Q
4	Chris Monk	Great Britain	21.25	q
5	Jaroslav Matoušek	Czechoslovakia	21.36	
6	Robert Tempel	West Germany	21.51	
7	Marek Bedyński	Poland	21.53	
			Wind: -0.1 m/s	

==== Heat 2 ====
Rank	Name	Nationality	Time	Notes
1	Hans-Jürgen Bombach	East Germany	21.04	Q
2	Joseph Arame	France	21.09	Q
3	Ainsley Bennett	Great Britain	21.13	Q
4	Marian Woronin	Poland	21.60	
	Valeriy Borzov	Soviet Union	DNS	
	Markku Kukkoaho	Finland	DNS	
			Wind: -2.4 m/s	

==== Heat 3 ====
Rank	Name	Nationality	Time	Notes
1	Manfred Ommer	West Germany	21.23	Q
2	Pietro Mennea	Italy	21.24	Q
3	Peter Muster	Switzerland	21.41	Q
4	Petar Petrov	Bulgaria	21.49	
5	Tibor Farkas	Hungary	22.06	
	Ossi Karttunen	Finland	DNS	
	V. Štefek	Czechoslovakia	DNS	
			Wind: +0.3 m/s	

==== Heat 4 ====
Rank	Name	Nationality	Time	Notes
1	Hans-Joachim Zenk	East Germany	21.30	Q
2	Philippe Leroux	France	21.40	Q
3	Steve Green	Great Britain	21.54	Q
4	Luis Sarría	Spain	21.54	
5	Zenon Nowosz	Poland	21.67	
6	Marian Králik	Czechoslovakia	21.67	
	Lambert Micha	Belgium	DNS	
			Wind: +1.5 m/s	

==== Heat 5 ====
Rank	Name	Nationality	Time	Notes
1	Franz-Peter Hofmeister	West Germany	21.03	Q
2	Thorsten Johansson	Sweden	21.34	Q
3	Antti Rajamäki	Finland	21.48	Q
4	Norberto Oliosi	Italy	21.54	
5	Miguel Arnau	Spain	21.72	
6	Jiří Kynos	Czechoslovakia	22.38	
			Wind: +1.4 m/s	

=== Semi-finals ===
6 September

==== Heat 1 ====
Rank	Name	Nationality	Time	Notes
1	Hans-Jürgen Bombach	East Germany	20.81	Q
2	Manfred Ommer	West Germany	20.92	Q
3	Bruno Cherrier	France	20.94	Q
4	Antti Rajamäki	Finland	20.97	Q
5	Luigi Benedetti	Italy	21.11	
6	Philippe Leroux	France	21.22	
7	Thorsten Johansson	Sweden	21.26	
8	Chris Monk	Great Britain	21.32	
			Wind: -1.6 m/s	

==== Heat 2 ====
Rank	Name	Nationality	Time	Notes
1	Pietro Mennea	Italy	20.83	Q
2	Franz-Peter Hofmeister	West Germany	21.09	Q
3	Joseph Arame	France	21.16	Q
4	Ainsley Bennett	Great Britain	21.23	Q
5	Raymond Heerenveen	Netherlands	21.44	
6	Hans-Joachim Zenk	East Germany	21.46	
7	Steve Green	Great Britain	21.52	
8	Peter Muster	Switzerland	77.41	
			Wind: +0.5 m/s	

=== Final ===
6 September

Rank	Name	Nationality	Time	Notes
1st place, gold medalist(s)	Pietro Mennea	Italy	20.60	
2nd place, silver medalist(s)	Manfred Ommer	West Germany	20.76	
3rd place, bronze medalist(s)	Hans-Jürgen Bombach	East Germany	20.83	
4	Joseph Arame	France	20.87	
5	Franz-Peter Hofmeister	West Germany	20.93	
6	Bruno Cherrier	France	21.02	
7	Ainsley Bennett	Great Britain	21.29	
	Antti Rajamäki	Finland	DNS	
			Wind: -0.8 m/s	
