= 1974 European Athletics Championships – Men's 100 metres =

Men's 100 metres at the 1974 European Athletics Championships
- Venue: Stadio Olimpico
- Location: Rome
- Dates: 2 September (heats); 3 September (semifinals & final)
- Competitors: 28 from 14 nations
- Winning time: 10.27

Medalists
gold medal	Valeriy Borzov	Soviet Union
silver medal	Pietro Mennea	Italy
bronze medal	Klaus-Dieter Bieler	West Germany

The men's 100 metres at the 1974 European Athletics Championships was held in Rome, Italy, at Stadio Olimpico on 2 and 3 September 1974.

== Participation ==
According to an unofficial count, 28 athletes from 14 countries participated in the event.

- Belgium (1)
- Czechoslovakia (2)
- East Germany (3)
- Finland (3)
- France (1)
- Greece (1)
- Hungary (3)
- Italy (1)
- Poland (3)
- Soviet Union (3)
- Spain (1)
- Sweden (2)
- Great Britain (1)
- West Germany (3)

== Results ==
=== Heats ===
2 September

==== Heat 1 ====
Rank	Name	Nationality	Time	Notes
1	Valeriy Borzov	Soviet Union	10.49	Q
2	Dominique Chauvelot	France	10.56	Q
3	Zenon Nowosz	Poland	10.64	Q
4	Michael Droese	East Germany	10.65	q
5	Lambert Micha	Belgium	10.67	q
6	Juraj Demeč	Czechoslovakia	10.80	
7	Lasse Malin	Finland	10.85	
			Wind: -1.2 m/s	

==== Heat 2 ====
Rank	Name	Nationality	Time	Notes
1	Pietro Mennea	Italy	10.46	Q
2	Klaus Ehl	West Germany	10.54	Q
3	Aleksandr Kornelyuk	Soviet Union	10.63	q
4	Andrzej Świerczyński	Poland	10.73	
5	Hans-Joachim Zenk	East Germany	10.82	
6	Endre Lepold	Hungary	10.97	
	Marian Králik	Czechoslovakia	DNS	
	Joseph Arame	France	DNS	
			Wind: -2.5 m/s	

==== Heat 3 ====
Rank	Name	Nationality	Time	Notes
1	Christer Garpenborg	Sweden	10.53	Q
2	Klaus-Dieter Bieler	West Germany	10.54	Q
3	Raimo Vilén	Finland	10.57	Q
4	Juris Silovs	Soviet Union	10.62	q
5	Javier Martínez	Spain	10.82	
6	Don Halliday	Great Britain	10.86	
7	László Korona	Hungary	10.95	
	Vincenzo Guerini	Italy	DNS	
			Wind: -0.6 m/s	

==== Heat 4 ====
Wind: -1 m/s

Rank	Name	Nationality	Time	Notes
1	Antti Rajamäki	Finland	10.58	Q
2	Vasilios Papageorgopoulos	Greece	10.59	Q
3	Manfred Ommer	West Germany	10.59	Q
4	Siegfried Schenke	East Germany	10.70	q
5	Lajos Gresa	Hungary	10.74	
6	Marian Woronin	Poland	10.77	
7	Rolf Trulsson	Sweden	10.78	
8	Luděk Bohman	Czechoslovakia	10.92	
			Wind: -1.0 m/s	

=== Semi-finals ===
3 September

==== Semi-final 1 ====
Rank	Name	Nationality	Time	Notes
1	Valeriy Borzov	Soviet Union	10.39	Q
2	Manfred Ommer	West Germany	10.42	Q
3	Christer Garpenborg	Sweden	10.42	Q
4	Aleksandr Kornelyuk	Soviet Union	10.45	Q
5	Klaus Ehl	West Germany	10.50	
6	Raimo Vilén	Finland	10.52	
7	Lambert Micha	Belgium	10.55	
8	Michael Droese	East Germany	10.59	
			Wind: +2.0 m/s	

==== Semi-final 2 ====
Rank	Name	Nationality	Time	Notes
1	Dominique Chauvelot	France	10.28	Q
2	Pietro Mennea	Italy	10.29	Q
3	Juris Silovs	Soviet Union	10.36	Q
4	Klaus-Dieter Bieler	West Germany	10.44	Q
5	Vasilios Papageorgopoulos	Greece	10.44	
6	Antti Rajamäki	Finland	10.46	
7	Zenon Nowosz	Poland	10.61	
8	Siegfried Schenke	East Germany	10.69	
			Wind: +1.5 m/s	

=== Final ===
3 September

Rank	Name	Nationality	Time	Notes
1st place, gold medalist(s)	Valeriy Borzov	Soviet Union	10.27	
2nd place, silver medalist(s)	Pietro Mennea	Italy	10.34	
3rd place, bronze medalist(s)	Klaus-Dieter Bieler	West Germany	10.35	
4	Juris Silovs	Soviet Union	10.35	
5	Dominique Chauvelot	France	10.35	
6	Manfred Ommer	West Germany	10.36	
7	Christer Garpenborg	Sweden	10.39	
8	Aleksandr Kornelyuk	Soviet Union	10.43	
			Wind: -1.0 m/s	
