= 1975 European Cup (athletics) =

- Host city: Nice, France
- Level: Senior
- Type: Outdoor
- Events: 33

The 1975 European Cup was the 5th edition of the European Cup of athletics.

The Finals were held in Nice, France.

== Final ==
Held in Nice on 16 and 17 August for both men and women.

=== Team standings ===
Men
| Pos. | Nation | Points |
|---|---|---|
| 1 | East Germany | 112 |
| 2 | Soviet Union | 109 |
| 3 | Poland | 100 |
| 4 | Great Britain | 83 |
| 5 | West Germany | 83 |
| 6 | Finland | 83 |
| 7 | France | 80 |
| 8 | Italy | 68 |

Women
| Pos. | Nation | Points |
|---|---|---|
| 1 | East Germany | 97 |
| 2 | Soviet Union | 77 |
| 3 | West Germany | 64 |
| 4 | Poland | 57 |
| 5 | Romania | 52 |
| 6 | Bulgaria | 47 |
| 7 | Great Britain | 39 |
| 8 | France | 35 |

=== Results summary ===
==== Men's events ====
| Event | Gold | | Silver | | Bronze | |
|---|---|---|---|---|---|---|
| 100 m (Wind: -0.7 m/s) | Valeriy Borzov; Soviet Union | 10.40 | Pietro Mennea; Italy | 10.40 | Alexander Thieme; East Germany | 10.53 |
| 200 m (Wind: -0.9 m/s) | Pietro Mennea; Italy | 20.42; CR | Valeriy Borzov; Soviet Union | 20.61 | Antti Rajamäki; Finland | 20.97 |
| 400 m | David Jenkins; Great Britain | 45.52 | Markku Kukkoaho; Finland | 45.56 | Jerzy Pietrzyk; Poland | 45.67 |
| 800 m | Steve Ovett; Great Britain | 1:46.56 | Dieter Fromm; East Germany | 1:47.36 | Vladimir Ponomaryov; Soviet Union | 1:47.64 |
| 1500 m | Thomas Wessinghage; West Germany | 3:39.1a | Bronisław Malinowski; Poland | 3:39.8a | Frank Clement; Great Britain | 3:40.1a |
| 5000 m | Brendan Foster; Great Britain | 13:36.18; CR | Enn Sellik; Soviet Union | 13:42.8a | Manfred Kuschmann; East Germany | 13:44.78 |
| 10,000 m | Karl-Heinz Leiteritz; East Germany | 28:37.2a | Dave Black; Great Britain | 28:42.2a | Giuseppe Cindolo; Italy | 28:48.0a |
| 3000 m steeplechase | Michael Karst; West Germany | 8:16.4a | Frank Baumgartl; East Germany | 8:17.6a | Bronisław Malinowski; Poland | 8:18.6a |
| 110 m hurdles (Wind: -1.4 m/s) | Guy Drut; France | 13.57; CR | Thomas Munkelt; East Germany | 13.78 | Viktor Myasnikov; Soviet Union | 13.88 |
| 400 m hurdles | Alan Pascoe; Great Britain | 49.00; CR | Jean-Claude Nallet; France | 49.38 | Jerzy Hewelt; Poland | 50.59 |
| 4 × 100 m | East Germany; Hans-Joachim Zenk; Thomas Munkelt; Hans-Jürgen Bombach; Alexander Thieme | 38.98; CR | Soviet Union; Aleksandr Kornelyuk; Nikolay Kolesnikov; Juris Silovs; Valeriy Borzov | 39.00 | Italy; Vincenzo Guerini; Luciano Caravani; Luigi Benedetti; Pietro Mennea | 39.32 |
| 4 × 400 m | Great Britain; Glen Cohen; Jim Aukett; Bill Hartley; David Jenkins | 3:02.9a | West Germany; Franz-Peter Hofmeister; Horst-Rüdiger Schlöske; Lothar Krieg; Bernd Herrmann | 3:03.4a | Finland; Juhani Tiihonen; Ossi Karttunen; Markku Taskinen; Markku Kukkoaho | 3:04.1a |
| High jump | Aleksandr Grigoryev; Soviet Union | 2.24; CR | Paul Poaniewa; France | 2.22 | Rolf Beilschmidt; East Germany | 2.20 |
| Pole vault | Władysław Kozakiewicz; Poland | 5.45 | Antti Kalliomäki; Finland | 5.40 | Yuriy Isakov; Soviet Union | 5.40 |
| Long jump | Grzegorz Cybulski; Poland | 8.15; CR | Valeriy Podluzhniy; Soviet Union | 7.92 | Peter Rieger; East Germany | 7.70 |
| Triple jump | Viktor Sanyeyev; Soviet Union | 16.97 | Christian Valétudié; France | 16.70 | Andrzej Sontag; Poland | 16.32 |
| Shot put | Geoff Capes; Great Britain | 20.75 | Heinz-Joachim Rothenburg; East Germany | 20.33 | Valeriy Voykin; Soviet Union | 19.47 |
| Discus throw | Wolfgang Schmidt; East Germany | 63.16 | Pentti Kahma; Finland | 62.70 | Hein-Direck Neu; West Germany | 62.20 |
| Hammer throw | Karl-Hans Riehm; West Germany | 77.50; CR | Valentin Dmitrenko; Soviet Union | 77.22 | Jochen Sachse; East Germany | 76.04 |
| Javelin throw | Nikolay Grebnyev; Soviet Union | 84.30 | Piotr Bielczyk; Poland | 82.00 | Seppo Hovinen; Finland | 81.02 |
WR world record | AR area record | CR championship record | GR games record | NR national record | OR Olympic record | PB personal best | SB season best | WL world leading (in a given season)

==== Women's events ====
| Event | Gold | | Silver | | Bronze | |
|---|---|---|---|---|---|---|
| 100 m (Wind: -0.5 m/s) | Renate Stecher; East Germany | 11.29 | Andrea Lynch; Great Britain | 11.37 | Irena Szewińska; Poland | 11.41 |
| 200 m (Wind: -0.8 m/s) | Renate Stecher; East Germany | 22.63; CR | Irena Szewińska; Poland | 22.84 | Annegret Richter; West Germany | 23.28 |
| 400 m | Irena Szewińska; Poland | 50.50; CR | Ellen Streidt; East Germany | 50.61 | Donna Murray; Great Britain | 51.30 |
| 800 m | Mariana Suman; Romania | 2:00.6a | Ulrike Klapezynski; East Germany | 2:00.7a | Lilyana Tomova; Bulgaria | 2:01.1a |
| 1500 m | Waltraud Strotzer; East Germany | 4:08.0a | Natalia Andrei; Romania | 4:08.4a | Tatyana Kazankina; Soviet Union | 4:08.9a |
| 100 m hurdles (Wind: -0.3 m/s) | Annelie Ehrhardt; East Germany | 12.83; CR | Grażyna Rabsztyn; Poland | 12.85 | Natalya Lebedeva; Soviet Union | 12.93 |
| 4 × 100 m | East Germany; Monika Meyer; Renate Stecher; Carla Bodendorf; Sybille Priebsch | 42.81; CR | Soviet Union; Nadezhda Besfamilnaya; Lyudmila Maslakova; Svetlana Belova; Vera Anisimova | 43.19 | West Germany; Inge Helten; Annegret Kroniger; Annegret Richter; Brigit Wilkes | 43.58 |
| 4 × 400 m | East Germany; Brigitte Rohde; Gisela Anton; Rita Kühne; Ellen Streidt | 3:24.0a CR | Great Britain; Jannette Roscoe; Gladys Taylor; Verona Elder; Donna Murray | 3:26.6a | Soviet Union; Inta Kļimoviča; Larisa Golovanova; Ingrida Barkane; Nadezhda Ilyina | 3:27.0a |
| High jump | Rosemarie Ackermann; East Germany | 1.94 | Ulrike Meyfarth; West Germany | 1.92 | Virginia Ioan; Romania | 1.86 |
| Long jump | Lidiya Alfeyeva; Soviet Union | 6.76 | Christa Striezel; West Germany | 6.56 | Jacqueline Curtet; France | 6.36 |
| Shot put | Marianne Adam; East Germany | 21.32; CR | Svetlana Krachevskaya; Soviet Union | 20.53 | Ivanka Khristova; Bulgaria | 20.24 |
| Discus throw | Faina Melnik; Soviet Union | 66.54 | Gabriele Hinzmann; East Germany | 64.72 | Argentina Menis; Romania | 63.60 |
| Javelin throw | Ruth Fuchs; East Germany | 64.80 | Svetlana Babich; Soviet Union | 61.88 | Lyutviyan Mollova; Bulgaria | 58.36 |
WR world record | AR area record | CR championship record | GR games record | NR national record | OR Olympic record | PB personal best | SB season best | WL world leading (in a given season)

== Semifinals ==
=== Men ===
All semifinals were held on 12 and 13 July.

Semifinal 1
Held in Turin, Italy

| Pos. | Nation | Points |
|---|---|---|
| 1 | West Germany | 101 |
| 2 | Italy | 83 |
| 3 | Romania | 65 |
| 4 | Hungary | 62 |
| 5 | Czechoslovakia | 61 |
| 6 | Belgium | 47 |

Semifinal 2
Held in London, United Kingdom

| Pos. | Nation | Points |
|---|---|---|
| 1 | Poland | 92 |
| 2 | Great Britain | 91 |
| 3 | Soviet Union | 80 |
| 4 | Sweden | 68 |
| 5 | Spain | 49 |
| 6 | Bulgaria | 38 |

Semifinal 3
Held in Leipzig, East Germany

| Pos. | Nation | Points |
|---|---|---|
| 1 | East Germany | 98 |
| 2 | Finland | 89 |
| 3 | France | 71.5 |
| 4 | Yugoslavia | 61.5 |
| 5 | Switzerland | 55 |
| 6 | Greece | 43 |

=== Women ===
All semifinals were held on 12 July.

Semifinal 1
Held in Lüdenscheid, West Germany

| Pos. | Nation | Points |
|---|---|---|
| 1 | Poland | 63 |
| 2 | West Germany | 63 |
| 3 | Finland | 48 |
| 4 | Czechoslovakia | 44 |
| 5 | Italy | 33 |
| 6 | Denmark | 21 |

Semifinal 2
Held in Sofia, Bulgaria

| Pos. | Nation | Points |
|---|---|---|
| 1 | East Germany | 77 |
| 2 | Bulgaria | 54 |
| 3 | Great Britain | 53 |
| 4 | Netherlands | 32 |
| 5 | Sweden | 31 |
| 6 | Yugoslavia | 26 |

Semifinal 3
Held in Budapest, Hungary

| Pos. | Nation | Points |
|---|---|---|
| 1 | Soviet Union | 68 |
| 2 | Romania | 50 |
| 3 | Hungary | 46 |
| 4 | France | 37 |
| 5 | Austria | 36 |
| 6 | Belgium | 34 |

== Preliminaries ==
=== Men ===
All preliminaries were held on 14 and 15 June. First three teams advanced to the semifinals.

Preliminary 1
Held in Lisbon, Portugal

| Pos. | Nation | Points |
|---|---|---|
| 1 | Spain | 114 |
| 2 | Switzerland | 110 |
| 3 | Belgium | 93 |
| 4 | Netherlands | 88 |
| 5 | Portugal | 65 |
| 6 | Iceland | 46 |
| 7 | Ireland | 43 |

Preliminary 2
Held in Athens, Greece

| Pos. | Nation | Points |
|---|---|---|
| 1 | Romania | 94 |
| 2 | Bulgaria | 92 |
| 3 | Greece | 90 |
| 4 | Norway | 59 |
| 5 | Austria | 47 |
| 6 | Denmark | 45 |

=== Women ===
All preliminaries were held on 14 June. First three teams advanced to the semifinals.

Preliminary 1
Held in Madrid, Spain

| Pos. | Nation | Points |
|---|---|---|
| 1 | Czechoslovakia | 63 |
| 2 | Belgium | 57 |
| 3 | Sweden | 52 |
| 4 | Switzerland | 52 |
| 5 | Spain | 28 |
| 6 | Portugal | 20 |

Preliminary 2
Held in Osijek, Yugoslavia

| Pos. | Nation | Points |
|---|---|---|
| 1 | Yugoslavia | 50 |
| 2 | Austria | 45 |
| 3 | Denmark | 41 |
| 4 | Ireland | 31 |
| 5 | Greece | 27 |
