= 1973 European Cup (athletics) =

- Host city: Edinburgh, United Kingdom
- Level: Senior
- Type: Outdoor
- Events: 33

The 1973 European Cup was the 4th edition of the European Cup of athletics.

The Finals were held at the Meadowbank Stadium in Edinburgh, Scotland, for the first time on a synthetic track.

== Final ==
Held in Edinburgh on 8–9 September (men) and 7 September (women).

=== Team standings ===
Men
Pos.	Nation	Points
1	Soviet Union	82.5
2	East Germany	78.5
3	West Germany	76
4	Great Britain	70.5
5	Finland	65
6	France	45

Women
Pos.	Nation	Points
1	East Germany	72
2	Soviet Union	52
3	Bulgaria	50
4	West Germany	36
	Great Britain	36
6	Romania	27

=== Results summary ===
==== Men's events ====
Event	Gold		Silver		Bronze	
100 m (Wind: +1.5 m/s)	Siegfried Schenke; East Germany	10.26; CR	Aleksandr Kornelyuk; Soviet Union	10.34	Jobst Hirscht; West Germany	10.47
200 m (Wind: -3.3 m/s)	Chris Monk; Great Britain	21.00	Hans-Jürgen Bombach; East Germany	21.05	Ossi Karttunen; Finland	21.24
400 m	Karl Honz; West Germany	45.20	David Jenkins; Great Britain	46.00	Ossi Karttunen; Finland	46.26
800 m	Andy Carter; Great Britain	1:46.44; CR	Yevgeniy Arzhanov; Soviet Union	1:46.70	Dieter Fromm; East Germany	1:46.71
1500 m	Frank Clement; Great Britain	3:40.79	Paul-Heinz Wellmann; West Germany	3:41.85	Klaus-Peter Justus; East Germany	3:42.61
5000 m	Brendan Foster; Great Britain	13:54.65	Manfred Kuschmann; East Germany	13:55.31	Harald Norpoth; West Germany	13:57.66
10,000 m	Nikolay Sviridov; Soviet Union	28:44.08	Detlef Uhlemann; West Germany	28:44.22	Karl-Heinz Leiteritz; East Germany	28:44.36
3000 m steeplechase	Tapio Kantanen; Finland	8:28.45	Willi Maier; West Germany	8:29.76	Leonid Savelyev; Soviet Union	8:30.93
110 m hurdles (Wind: +0.8 m/s)	Guy Drut; France	13.70	Anatoliy Moshiashvili; Soviet Union	13.76	Thomas Munkelt; East Germany	13.77
400 m hurdles	Alan Pascoe; Great Britain	50.07; CR	Dmitriy Stukalov; Soviet Union	50.61	Jürgen Laser; East Germany	51.09
4 × 100 m	East Germany; Manfred Kokot; Michael Droese; Hans-Jürgen Bombach; Klaus-Dieter Kurrat	39.45	West Germany; Jobst Hirscht; Klaus Ehl; Manfred Ommer; Franz-Peter Hofmeister	39.49	Great Britain; Brian Green; Chris Monk; Ian Matthews; Les Piggot	39.86
4 × 400 m	West Germany; Hermann Köhler; Horst-Rüdiger Schlöske; Bernd Herrmann; Karl Honz	3:04.25; CR	Soviet Union; Valeriy Yurchenko; Leonid Korolyev; Valeriy Yudin; Semyon Kocher	3:05.11	Great Britain; John Wilson; Alan Pascoe; Joe Chivers; David Jenkins	3:06.27
High jump	Valentin Gavrilov; Soviet Union	2.15	Asko Pesonen; Finland	2.13	Paul Poaniewa; France	2.09
Pole vault	Yuriy Isakov; Soviet Union; Antti Kalliomäki; Finland	5.30			Mike Bull; Great Britain; Reinhard Kuretzky; West Germany	5.20
Long jump	Valeriy Podluzhniy; Soviet Union	8.20w	Hans Baumgartner; West Germany	8.12	Max Klauss; East Germany	8.03
Triple jump	Viktor Sanyeyev; Soviet Union	16.90w	Jörg Drehmel; East Germany	16.89	Esa Rinne; Finland	16.18
Shot put	Hartmut Briesenick; East Germany	20.95	Reijo Ståhlberg; Finland	20.27	Geoff Capes; East Germany	19.80
Discus throw	Pentti Kahma; Finland	63.10	Siegfried Pachale; East Germany	60.48	Bill Tancred; Great Britain	59.06
Hammer throw	Anatoliy Bondarchuk; Soviet Union	74.08	Reinhard Theimer; East Germany	72.06	Jacques Accambray; West Germany	71.90
Javelin throw	Klaus Wolfermann; West Germany	90.68	Jānis Lūsis; Soviet Union	88.48	Hannu Siitonen; Finland	84.08
WR world record | AR area record | CR championship record | GR games record | NR national record | OR Olympic record | PB personal best | SB season best | WL world leading (in a given season)

==== Women's events ====
Event	Gold		Silver		Bronze	
100 m (Wind: +1.3 m/s)	Renate Stecher; East Germany	11.25	Annegret Richter; West Germany	11.32	Marina Sidorova; Soviet Union	11.40
200 m (Wind: +0.8 m/s)	Renate Stecher; East Germany	22.81	Marina Sidorova; Soviet Union	22.93	Helen Golden; Great Britain	23.14
400 m	Monika Zehrt; East Germany	51.75; CR	Lilyana Tomova; Bulgaria	52.33	Nadezhda Kolesnikova; Soviet Union	52.35
800 m	Gunhild Hoffmeister; East Germany	1:58.94; CR	Svetla Zlateva; Bulgaria	1:59.05	Nijolé Sabaité; Soviet Union	2:02.17
1500 m	Tonka Petrova; Bulgaria	4:09.02; CR	Karin Krebs; East Germany	4:09.37	Lyudmila Bragina; Soviet Union	4:10.11
100 m hurdles (Wind: 0.0 m/s)	Annelie Ehrhardt; East Germany	12.95; CR	Judy Vernon; Great Britain	13.34	Natalya Lebedeva; Soviet Union	13.62
4 × 100 m	East Germany; Petra Kandarr; Renate Stecher; Christina Heinich; Doris Selmigkeit	42.95; CR	West Germany; Elfgard Schittenhelm; Inge Helten; Annegret Richter; Annegret Kroniger	43.68	Great Britain; Elizabeth Sutherland; Helen Golden; Judy Vernon; Andrea Lynch	44.78
4 × 400 m	East Germany; Waltraud Dietsch; Renate Siebach; Monika Zehrt; Rita Kühne	3:28.66; CR	Soviet Union; Nina Zyuskova; Ingrida Barkane; Natalya Kulichkova; Nadezhda Kolesnikova	3:30.57	Bulgaria; Zdravka Trifonova; Lilyana Tomova; Stefka Yordanova; Svetla Zlateva	3:31.89
High jump	Yordanka Blagoeva; Bulgaria	1.84	Rita Kirst; East Germany	1.82	Galina Filatova; Soviet Union; Virginia Ioan; Romania; Barbara Lawton; Great Britain	1.80
Long jump	Angela Schmalfeld; East Germany	6.63	Viorica Viscopoleanu; Romania	6.39	Ruth Martin-Jones; Great Britain	6.30w
Shot put	Nadezhda Chizhova; Soviet Union	20.77; CR	Ivanka Khristova; Bulgaria	19.23	Marita Lange; East Germany	18.81
Discus throw	Faina Melnik; Soviet Union	69.48; WR, CR	Argentina Menis; Romania	64.16	Gabriele Hinzmann; East Germany	63.76
Javelin throw	Ruth Fuchs; East Germany	66.10; WR, CR	Lyutviyan Mollova; Bulgaria	60.30	Ameli Koloska; West Germany	55.46
WR world record | AR area record | CR championship record | GR games record | NR national record | OR Olympic record | PB personal best | SB season best | WL world leading (in a given season)

== Semifinals ==
=== Men ===
All semifinals were held on 4 and 5 August. First two teams advanced to the final.

Semifinal 1
Held in Oslo, Norway

Pos.	Nation	Points
1	Soviet Union	98.5
2	Great Britain	80.5
3	Italy	72.5
4	Hungary	62
5	Norway	57.5
6	Belgium	48

Semifinal 2
Held in Celje, Yugoslavia

Pos.	Nation	Points
1	West Germany	103
2	Finland	88
3	Poland	83.5
4	Yugoslavia	63
5	Switzerland	43
6	Spain	37

Semifinal 3
Held in Nice, France

Pos.	Nation	Points
1	East Germany	98.5
2	France	90
3	Czechoslovakia	76
4	Sweden	73
5	Romania	42
6	Bulgaria	40.5

=== Women ===
All semifinals were held on 4 August. First two teams advanced to the final.

Semifinal 1
Held in Warsaw, Poland

Pos.	Nation	Points
1	Soviet Union	63
2	Bulgaria	58
3	Poland	55.5
4	Finland	36.5
5	Sweden	33
6	Austria	26

Semifinal 2
Held in Bucharest, Romania

Pos.	Nation	Points
1	East Germany	76
2	Romania	54
3	Hungary	53.5
4	Italy	43
5	Switzerland	24
6	Norway	22.5

Semifinal 3
Held in Sittard, Netherlands

Pos.	Nation	Points
1	West Germany	60
2	Great Britain	57
3	France	50
4	Netherlands	39
5	Yugoslavia	38
6	Czechoslovakia	28

== Preliminaries ==
=== Men ===
All preliminaries were held on 30 June and 1 July. First two teams advanced to the semifinals.

Preliminary 1
Held in Lisbon, Portugal

Pos.	Nation	Points
1	Switzerland	68
2	Yugoslavia	63.5
3	Portugal	37.5
4	Ireland	29

Preliminary 2
Held in Brussels, Belgium

Pos.	Nation	Points
1	Norway	105
2	Belgium	90
3	Netherlands	83
4	Denmark	64.5
5	Iceland	42
6	Luxembourg	32.5

Preliminary 3
Held in Athenes, Greece

Pos.	Nation	Points
1	Romania	42
2	Bulgaria	38.5
3	Greece	36.5

=== Women ===
All preliminaries were held on 30 June and 1 July. First three teams advanced to the semifinals.

Preliminary 1
Held in Lyngby, Denmark

Pos.	Nation	Points
1	Finland	66
2	Czechoslovakia	62
3	Norway	45
4	Denmark	43
5	Ireland	40
6	Iceland	16

Preliminary 2
Held in Rijeka, Yugoslavia

Pos.	Nation	Points
1	Yugoslavia	67
2	Switzerland	57.5
3	Austria	47.5
4	Belgium	42
5	Spain	35
6	Portugal	24
