= 1974 European Athletics Championships – Men's 4 × 100 metres relay =

Men's 4 × 100 metres relay at the European Athletics Championships

The men's 4 × 100 metres relay at the 1974 European Athletics Championships was held in Rome, Italy, at Stadio Olimpico on 7 and 8 September 1974.

== Medalists ==
Gold	Lucien Sainte-Rose; Joseph Arame; Bruno Cherrier; Dominique Chauvelot; France
Silver	Vincenzo Guerini; Norberto Oliosi; Luigi Benedetti; Pietro Mennea; Italy
Bronze	Manfred Kokot; Michael Droese; Hans-Jürgen Bombach; Siegfried Schenke; East Germany

== Results ==
=== Final ===
8 September

Rank	Nation	Competitors	Time	Notes
1st place, gold medalist(s)	France	Lucien Sainte-Rose; Joseph Arame; Bruno Cherrier; Dominique Chauvelot	38.69	CR
2nd place, silver medalist(s)	Italy	Vincenzo Guerini; Norberto Oliosi; Luigi Benedetti; Pietro Mennea	38.88	
3rd place, bronze medalist(s)	East Germany	Manfred Kokot; Michael Droese; Hans-Jürgen Bombach; Siegfried Schenke	38.99	
4	Soviet Union	Aleksandr Kornelyuk; Aleksandr Aksinin; Juris Silovs; Valeriy Borzov	39.03	
5	Poland	Andrzej Świerczyński; Marek Bedyński; Grzegorz Mądry; Zenon Nowosz	39.35	
6	Spain	Luis Sarría; Juan Sarrasqueta; Miguel Arnau; José Luis Sánchez Paraíso	39.87	
7	Bulgaria	Lyubomir Ivanov; Petar Petrov; Georgi Ganchev; Mirolyub Petkov	39.91	
8	Czechoslovakia	Jiří Kynos; Jaroslav Matoušek; Juraj Demeč; Luděk Bohman	39.92	

=== Heats ===
7 September

==== Heat 1 ====
Rank	Nation	Competitors	Time	Notes
1	Italy	Vincenzo Guerini; Norberto Oliosi; Luigi Benedetti; Pietro Mennea	39.27	Q
2	East Germany	Manfred Kokot; Michael Droese; Hans-Jürgen Bombach; Siegfried Schenke	39.33	Q
3	Poland	Andrzej Świerczyński; Marek Bedyński; Grzegorz Mądry; Zenon Nowosz	39.78	Q
4	Spain	Luis Sarría; Juan Sarrasqueta; Miguel Arnau; José Luis Sánchez Paraíso	40.01	Q
5	Sweden	Rolf Trulsson; Per-Olof Sjöberg; Dimitrie Grama; Christer Garpenborg	40.11	
6	Finland	Ossi Karttunen; Raimo Vilén; Lasse Malin; Markku Juhola	40.20	
7	Hungary	Lajos Gresa; Endre Lepold; László Korona; Tibor Farkas	40.36	

==== Heat 2 ====
Rank	Nation	Competitors	Time	Notes
1	France	Lucien Sainte-Rose; Joseph Arame; Bruno Cherrier; Dominique Chauvelot	39.24	Q
2	Soviet Union	Aleksandr Kornelyuk; Aleksandr Aksinin; Juris Silovs; Valeriy Borzov	39.55	Q
3	Bulgaria	Lyubomir Ivanov; Petar Petrov; Georgi Ganchev; Mirolyub Petkov	39.95	Q
4	Czechoslovakia	Jiří Kynos; Jaroslav Matoušek; Juraj Demeč; Luděk Bohman	40.00	Q
5	Great Britain	David Roberts; Alan Lerwill; Chris Monk; Don Halliday	40.33	
	West Germany	Klaus Ehl; Klaus-Dieter Bieler; Manfred Ommer; Franz-Peter Hofmeister	DQ	

== Participation ==
According to an unofficial count, 52 athletes from 13 countries participated in the event.

- Bulgaria (4)
- Czechoslovakia (4)
- East Germany (4)
- Finland (4)
- France (4)
- Hungary (4)
- Italy (4)
- Poland (4)
- Soviet Union (4)
- Spain (4)
- Sweden (4)
- Great Britain (4)
- West Germany (4)
