= Men's 100 metres European record progression =

Sprint race record progression

The following table shows the European record progression in the men's 100 metres, as ratified by the European Athletic Association.

== Hand timing ==
Time	Athlete	Nationality	Venue	Date
10.3	Arthur Jonath	Germany	Bochum, Germany	5 June 1932
10.3	Chris Berger	Netherlands	Amsterdam, Netherlands	26 August 1934
10.3	Lennart Strandberg	Sweden	Malmö, Sweden	26 September 1936
10.3	Karl Neckermann	Germany	Berlin, Germany	8 July 1939
10.2	McDonald Bailey	United Kingdom	Belgrade, Yugoslavia	25 August 1951
10.2	Heinz Futterer	West Germany	Yokohama, Japan	31 October 1954
10.2	Manfred Germar	West Germany	Cologne, West Germany	31 July 1957
10.2	Livio Berruti	Italy	Verona, Italy	26 May 1960
10.0	Armin Hary	West Germany	Zürich, Switzerland	21 June 1960
10.0	Roger Bambuck	France	Sacramento, United States	20 June 1968
10.0	Vladislav Sapeya	Soviet Union	Leninakan, Soviet Union	15 August 1968
10.0	Valeriy Borzov	Soviet Union	Kyiv, Soviet Union	18 August 1969
10.0	Gert Metz	West Germany	Burg-Gretesch, West Germany	6 September 1970
10.0	Manfred Kokot	East Germany	Erfurt, East Germany	15 May 1971
10.0	Vasilios Papageorgopoulos	Greece	Bratislava, Czechoslovakia	3 June 1972
10.0	Pietro Mennea	Italy	Milan, Italy	16 June 1972
10.0	Raimo Vilén	Finland	Vuosaari, Finland	27 July 1972
10.0	Aleksandr Kornelyuk	Soviet Union	Moscow, Soviet Union	10 July 1973
10.0	Michael Droese	East Germany	Dresden, East Germany	11 July 1973
10.0	Hans-Jurgen Bombach	East Germany	Dresden, East Germany	20 July 1973
10.0	Siegfried Schenke	East Germany	Berlin, Germany	29 August 1973
10.0	Manfred Ommer	West Germany	Leverkusen, West Germany	22 July 1974

== Automatic timing ==
Time	Athlete	Nationality	Venue	Date
10.07	Valeriy Borzov	Soviet Union	Munich, West Germany	31 August 1972
10.01	Pietro Mennea	Italy	Mexico City, Mexico	14 September 1979
10.00	Marian Woronin	Poland	Warsaw, Poland	9 June 1984
9.97	Linford Christie	United Kingdom	Seoul, South Korea	24 September 1988
9.92	Linford Christie	United Kingdom	Tokyo, Japan	25 August 1991
9.87	Linford Christie	United Kingdom	Stuttgart, Germany	15 August 1993
9.86	Francis Obikwelu	Portugal	Athens, Greece	22 August 2004
9.86	Jimmy Vicaut	France	Paris, France	4 July 2015
9.86	Jimmy Vicaut	France	Montreuil-sous-Bois, France	7 June 2016
9.84	Marcell Jacobs	Italy	Tokyo, Japan	1 August 2021
9.80	Marcell Jacobs	Italy	Tokyo, Japan	1 August 2021
