= Endre Lépold =

Hungarian sprinter (1955–2020)

Personal information
- Nationality: Hungarian
- Born: 21 October 1955 Lánycsók, Hungary
- Died: 18 June 2020 (aged 64) Pécs, Hungary

Sport
- Sport: Sprinting
- Event: 100 metres
- Club: Pécsi Mecsek

Endre Lépold (21 October 1955 – 18 June 2020) was a Hungarian sprinter.

He competed without reaching the final in the 60 metres at the 1974 European Indoor Championships, the 100 metres and the 4 × 100 metres relay at the 1974 European Championships, and the 100 metres and 200 metres at the 1976 Summer Olympics.

He died on 18 June 2020.
