= Droese =

Droese is a surname. Notable people with the surname include:

- Duke Droese (born 1968), American retired professional wrestler and special education teacher
- Michael Droese (born 1952), German sprinter
- Siegbert Droese (born 1969), German politician
