= Norberto Oliosi =

Italian sprinter

Personal information
- Nationality: Italian
- Born: 1 December 1945 (age 80) Bracciano, Italy

Sport
- Country: Italy
- Sport: Athletics
- Event: Sprint

Achievements and titles
- Personal bests: 100 m: 10.56 (1971); 200 m: 20.95 (1974)
Medal record
Men's athletics
Representing Italy
European Championships
Silver medal – second place	1974 Rome	4x100 m

Norberto Oliosi (Bracciano, 1 December 1945) is a former Italian sprinter.

== Biography ==
He won one medal with the national relay team at the International athletics competitions. He has 9 caps in national team from 1971 to 1974. In 1997 he became Cavalier of the Order of Merit of the Italian Republic.

== Achievements ==
Year	Competition	Venue	Position	Event	Performance	Notes
1974	European Championships	(Italy) Rome	2nd	4 × 100 m relay	38,88	

== National titles ==
In the "Pietro Mennea era", Norberto Oliosi has won just one time the individual national championship.

- 1 win in 100 metres (1971)

== See also ==
- Italy national relay team
