= Luigi Benedetti =

Italian sprinter

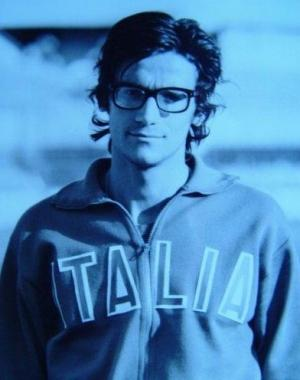

Personal information
- Nationality: Italian
- Born: 19 May 1951 (age 75) Massa Carrara, Italy
- Height: 1.81 m (5 ft 11 1/2 in)
- Weight: 70 kg (154 lb)

Sport
- Country: Italy
- Sport: Athletics
- Event: Sprint
- Club: Atletica Massa

Achievements and titles
- Personal best: 100 m: 10.3 (1973)
Medal record
Men's athletics
Representing Italy
European Championships
Silver medal – second place	1974 Rome	4×100 m relay
Mediterranean Games
Silver medal – second place	1975 Algers	4×100 m relay
Summer Universiade
Bronze medal – third place	1973 Moscow	4×100 m relay
European Cup
Bronze medal – third place	1975 Nice	4×100 m relay

Luigi Benedetti (born 19 May 1951, in Massa Carrara) is a former Italian sprinter.

He was twice a finalist with the national relay team on 4×100 metres relay at the Olympic Games (1972 and 1976).

== Biography ==
Luigi Benedetti won four medals with the national relay team at the International athletics competitions. He participated at two editions of the Summer Olympics (1972 and 1976), he has 22 caps in national team from 1971 to 1976.

== Olympic results ==
Year	Competition	Venue	Position	Event	Performance	Notes
1972	Olympic Games	(West Germany) Munich	8th	4 × 100 m relay	39.14	
1976	Olympic Games	(Canada) Montreal	6th	4 × 100 m relay	39.08	

== National titles ==
In the "Pietro Mennea era", Luigi Benedetti has one win in the individual national championship.

- 1 win in 100 metres (1973)

== See also ==
- Italy national relay team
