= Vincenzo Guerini (athlete) =

Italian sprinter (born 1950)

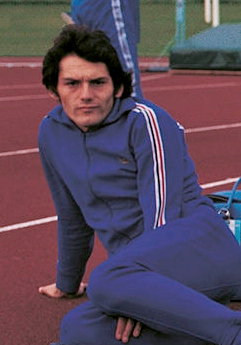
- Vincenzo Guerini at the 1972 Olympics

Personal information
- Nationality: Italian
- Born: 14 August 1950 (age 75) Casnigo, Italy
- Height: 1.63 m (5 ft 4 in)
- Weight: 59 kg (130 lb)

Sport
- Country: Italy
- Sport: Athletics
- Event: Sprint
- Club: Atalanta Bergamo

Achievements and titles
- Personal best: 100 m: 10.49 (1974)
Medal record
Men's athletics
Representing Italy
European Championships
Silver medal – second place	1974 Rome	4×100 m relay
Bronze medal – third place	1971 Helsinki	4×100 m relay
Summer Universiade
Bronze medal – third place	1973 Moscow	4×100 m relay
Mediterranean Games
Gold medal – first place	1971 Izmir	4×100 m relay
European Cup
Bronze medal – third place	1975 Nice	4×100 m relay

Vincenzo Guerini (born 14 August 1950) is a retired Italian sprinter.

== Biography ==
Between 1971 and 1978 he ran 26 international competitions with the national 4 × 100 m relay team, including the finals of the 1972 and 1976 Olympics, and won five medals. Nationally he faced a strong competition from Pietro Mennea, yet he won the 100 m Italian title in 1972 and 1976.

== See also ==
- Italy national relay team
