= Barbara Bakulin =

Polish sprinter (born 1950)

Personal information
- Born: 23 September 1950 (age 75) Gostyń, Wielkopolskie, Poland
- Height: 161 cm (5 ft 3 in)
- Weight: 54 kg (119 lb)

Sport
- Country: Poland
- Sport: Sprinting
- Event: 4 × 100 metres relay
- Club: Orkan Poznań
Medal record
Women's athletics
Representing Poland
European Championships
Bronze medal – third place	1974 Rome	4×100 m relay
Summer Universiade
Silver medal – second place	1973 Moscow	4x100 m relay
Silver medal – second place	1975 Rome	4x100 m relay

Barbara Bakulin (born 23 September 1950) is a Polish sprinter. She competed in the women's 4 × 100 metres relay at the 1972 Summer Olympics.
