= Domenico Fontanella =

Italian former long jumper

Personal information
- National team: Italy: 8 (1971)
- Born: 6 February 1949 (age 77) Piombino, Italy

Sport
- Sport: Athletics
- Event: Long jump
- Club: Italsider Genova; Alco Rieti

Achievements and titles
- Personal best: Long jump: 7.70 m (1975)

Domenico Fontanella (born 6 February 1949) is a former Italian long jumper.

== Career ==
Two-time national champion at senior level in long jump in 1970 and 1975.
