= Klaus-Dieter Bieler =

German sprinter (born 1949)

Personal information
- Nationality: German
- Born: 5 January 1949 (age 77) Braunschweig, Germany
- Height: 1.84 m (6 ft 1/2 in)
- Weight: 77 kg (170 lb)

Sport
- Sport: Athletics
- Club: Eintracht Braunschweig; TV Wattenscheid

Achievements and titles
- Personal best: 100 m – 10.32 (1976)
Medal record
Men's athletics
Representing West Germany
European Championships
Bronze medal – third place	1974 Rome	100 m
Summer Universiade
Bronze medal – third place	1975 Rome	4x100 m relay

Klaus-Dieter Bieler (born 5 January 1949) is a former German track and field athlete, who competed for West Germany in the 1976 Summer Olympics, taking part in the men's 100 metres and 4 × 100 metres relay events.

Bieler competed for the clubs Eintracht Braunschweig and TV Wattenscheid. His biggest success was winning the bronze medal in the 100 metres event at the 1974 European Athletics Championships.
