= Dominique Chauvelot =

French sprinter (born 1952)

Medal record

Men's athletics

Representing France

European Championships
Gold medal – first place	1974 Rome	4×100 m

Dominique Chauvelot (born 18 June 1952) is a French former athlete who competed in the 1972 Summer Olympics and in the 1976 Summer Olympics.
