= Willi Maier =

German middle-distance runner

Personal information
- Nationality: German
- Born: 12 September 1948 (age 77)

Sport
- Sport: Middle-distance running
- Event: Steeplechase

Willi Maier (born 12 September 1948) is a German middle-distance runner. He competed in the 3000 metres steeplechase at the 1972 Summer Olympics and the 1976 Summer Olympics. He was a national champion and record-holder in his event.
