= Peter Rieger (long jumper) =

East German long jumper

Peter Rieger (born 10 April 1953) is a retired East German long jumper.

He competed at the 1980 Olympic Games, but did not reach the final round. He represented the sports club ASK Vorwärts Potsdam, and became East German champion in 1975. His personal best jump was 8.10 metres, achieved in May 1980 in East Berlin.
