= Liliyana Panayotova-Ivanova =

Bulgarian sprinter

Personal information
- Nationality: Bulgarian
- Born: 17 March 1956 (age 70) Varna, Bulgaria
- Height: 1.74 m (5 ft 9 in)
- Weight: 64 kg (141 lb)

Sport
- Sport: Sprinting
- Event: 200 metres
- Club: Spartak Varna

Liliyana Nikolaeva Panayotova-Ivanova (Bulgarian: Лиляна Николаева Панайотова-Иванова; born 17 March 1956) is a Bulgarian sprinter. She competed in the 200 metres at the 1976 Summer Olympics and the 1980 Summer Olympics.
