= Bruno Cherrier =

French sprinter

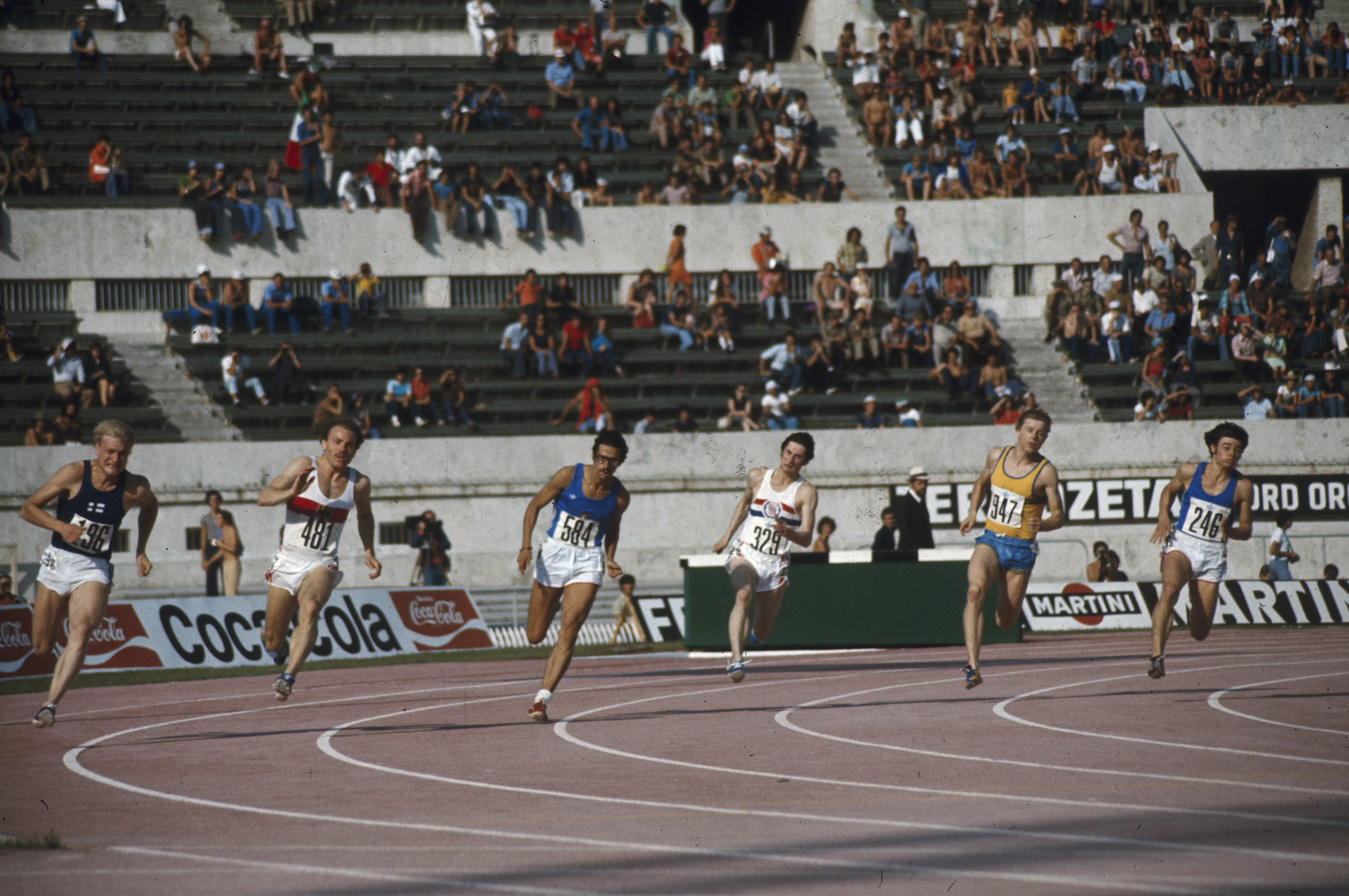
- Bruno Cherrier (first from right) competing at the 1974 European Athletics Championships in Rome

Medal record

Men's athletics

Representing France

European Championships
Gold medal – first place	1974 Rome	4×100 m

Bruno Cherrier (born 31 August 1953) is a French former athlete who competed in the 1972 Summer Olympics.
