= Esa Rinne =

Finnish triple jumper

Personal information
- Nationality: Finnish
- Born: 3 May 1943 (age 83)

Sport
- Sport: Athletics
- Event: Triple jump

Esa Rinne (born 3 May 1943) is a Finnish athlete. He competed in the men's triple jump at the 1972 Summer Olympics.
