= Christa Striezel =

German long jumper

Personal information
- Nationality: German
- Born: 28 July 1949 (age 76) Hamburg, West Germany

Sport
- Sport: Athletics
- Event: Long jump

Christa Striezel (born 28 July 1949) is a German athlete. She competed in the women's long jump at the 1976 Summer Olympics.
