= Luis Sarría =

Spanish sprinter

Personal information
- Nationality: Spanish
- Born: 8 May 1949 (age 76)

Sport
- Sport: Sprinting
- Event: 4 × 100 metres relay

Luis Sarría (born 8 May 1949) is a Spanish sprinter. He competed in the 4 × 100 metres relay at the 1972 Summer Olympics and the 1976 Summer Olympics.
