= Jaroslav Matoušek =

Czech sprinter

Personal information
- Nationality: Czech
- Born: 7 April 1951 (age 75) Trutnov, Czechoslovakia

Sport
- Sport: Sprinting
- Event: 100 metres

Jaroslav Matoušek (born 7 April 1951) is a Czech sprinter. He competed in the men's 100 metres at the 1972 Summer Olympics.
