= European Cup (athletics) =

Athletics competition

European Athletics Cup
- Status: defunct
- Genre: sports event
- Frequency: annual / biannual
- Location: various
- Inaugurated: 1965
- Most recent: 2008
- Organiser: European Athletic Association
- Website: www.european-athletics.com

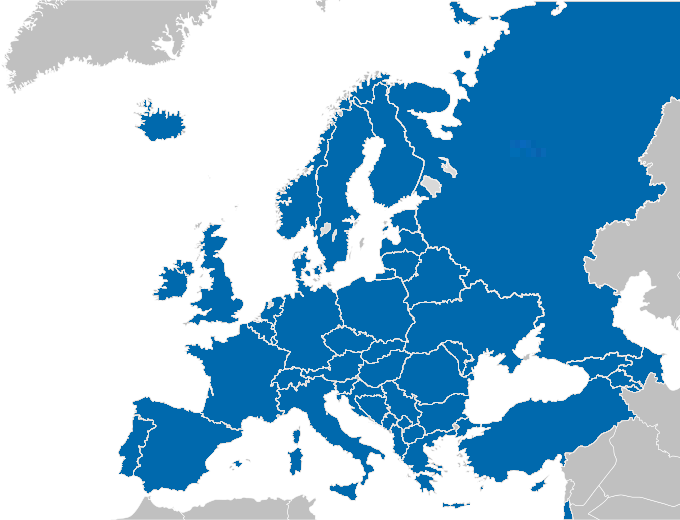
European Athletics Members

The European Cup is a former athletics competition for European teams that was replaced by the European Team Championships starting in 2009 and was organized by the European Athletics Association. The European Cup saw most of the major nations of Europe compete. Originally known as the Bruno Zauli Cup, it first took place in 1965 in Stuttgart (men) and Kassel (women), West Germany. Initially, the competition was a bi-annual event (tri-annual once); however, from 1993, it took place once every year.

== History ==
The main idea of the cup, developed by Bruno Zauli, president of the European Committee of the International Association of Athletics Federations, was to create a competition for all European athletics federations, in which they would face each other in track and field events. Although Zauli died a few months before the launch of the first event, the competition has gone from strength to strength.

The competition always had different leagues through which countries had to progress. For the first twenty years, there were different groups (leagues) that took place at different times. Smaller nations, like Luxembourg and Switzerland, would compete in preliminary rounds, before larger countries, such as the United Kingdom and France, would join in the semi-finals. The top two countries from three semi-finals would enter into the final.

This formula was fairly successful; however, by 1983 the number of competitions that athletes were expected to compete in made it extremely difficult for countries to send their best team to each event. The format of the cup had to be changed so that each country in the whole cup competed on the same day.

The top league was named the Super League and contained eight male and eight female teams. The male and female teams were separate teams, which meant that the female team of one country could get relegated while their male counterpart would stay in the Super League as long as they had enough points. Below the Super League were the First and Second Leagues, which contained other European countries that did not qualify for the finals.

== European Team Championships ==
In 2009, the competition took a new format, European Team Championships. There are now four leagues, which consist of 20 events for men and 20 for women. The Super League and the First League have 12 teams each, while the Second League and the Third League 8 and 14 respectively. Team scores are calculated by combination of men and women's points.

== Scoring system and relegation ==
Countries scored points for their performance in each race/event: The winning athlete received 8 points for their country, and this then carried on so second would get 7 points, third 6 points, etc. In the case of an athlete that did not finish a race, was disqualified or did not record a mark (as the case may be), their country would receive zero points for that event.

The male and female team with the most points was declared the winner. The four winning teams from the 'Super League' (two male and two female) went on to compete as individual countries in the IAAF World Cup in Athletics.

Since 1983, the lowest scoring male, and the lowest scoring female teams in the 'Super League' were relegated down into the 'First League'. These were replaced by the highest scoring male and female teams from the 'First League'. This process was repeated for relegation/promotion from the second to the first league. This system allowed countries to progress, and for a wider range of athletes to compete against opposition they might not normally face.

== League positions in 2009 ==
The leagues for the 2009 competition were formed by combination of each country's men and women's performances in 2008. As the teams are 46, the winning team received 46 points, the second 45 and so on. The new leagues are:

Super League
Country	Pts
Russia	1548
Great Britain	1518
Poland	1512
Germany	1472
Italy	1455
Spain	1426.5
France	1423.5
Ukraine	1412.5
Greece	1359.5
Sweden	1309
Czech Republic	1236
Portugal	1222

First League
Country	Pts
Belarus	1217
Slovenia	1211
Romania	1182.5
Turkey	1166
Belgium	1139
Hungary	1133
Netherlands	1118
Finland	1072.5
Estonia	1035.5
Switzerland	1032.5
Serbia	1028.5
Norway	974

Second League
Country	Pts
Ireland	971.5
Bulgaria	947
Croatia	942
Latvia	933
Slovakia	901
Lithuania	839.5
Austria	783
Cyprus	749

Third League
Country	Pts
Moldova	722
Israel	714
Denmark	709.5
Bosnia and Herzegovina	555.5
Iceland	550.5
Luxembourg	399.5
Georgia	356
Azerbaijan	332.5
Montenegro	310.5
Armenia	301.5
AASSE	280
Albania	191
Andorra	187
Macedonia	164

== Winners ==
European Cup highest tier winners
Year	Highest tier			Middle tier	Lowest tier	Highest tier men's winner	Highest tier women's winner	Highest tier finals host city	Highest tier finals host country
Year	Finals	Semi-Finals	Prelims	Middle tier	Lowest tier	Highest tier men's winner	Highest tier women's winner	Highest tier finals host city	Highest tier finals host country
1965	Final	Semi-Final	Preliminaries	—N/a		USSR	USSR	Stuttgart/Kassel	West Germany
1967	Final	Semi-Final	Preliminaries	—N/a		USSR	USSR	Kiev	USSR
1970	Final	Semi-Final	Preliminaries	—N/a		East Germany	East Germany	Stockholm/Budapest	Sweden/Hungary
1973	Final	Semi-Final	Preliminaries	—N/a		USSR	East Germany	Edinburgh	Great Britain
1975	Final	Semi-Final	Preliminaries	—N/a		East Germany	East Germany	Nice	France
1977	"A" Final	Semi-Final	Preliminaries	"B" Final	—N/a	East Germany	East Germany	Helsinki	Finland
1979	"A" Final	Semi-Final	Preliminaries	"B" Final	—N/a	East Germany	East Germany	Turin	Italy
1981	"A" Final	Semi-Final	Preliminaries	"B" Final	—N/a	East Germany	East Germany	Zagreb	Yugoslavia
1983	"A" Final	—N/a		"B" Final	"C" Final	East Germany	East Germany	London	Great Britain
1985	"A" Final	—N/a		"B" Final	"C" Final	USSR	USSR	Moscow	USSR
1987	"A" Final	—N/a		"B" Final	"C" Final	USSR	East Germany	Prague	Czechoslovakia
1989	"A" Final	—N/a		"B" Final	"C" Final	Great Britain	East Germany	Gateshead	Great Britain
1991	"A" Final	—N/a		"B" Final	"C" Final	USSR	Germany	Frankfurt	Germany
1993	Super League	—N/a		First League	Second League	Russia	Russia	Rome	Italy
1994	Super League	—N/a		First League	Second League	Germany	Germany	Birmingham	Great Britain
1995	Super League	—N/a		First League	Second League	Germany	Russia	Villeneuve d'Ascq	France
1996	Super League	—N/a		First League	Second League	Germany	Germany	Madrid	Spain
1997	Super League	—N/a		First League	Second League	Great Britain	Russia	Munich	Germany
1998	Super League	—N/a		First League	Second League	Great Britain	Russia	Saint Petersburg	Russia
1999	Super League	—N/a		First League	Second League	Germany	Russia	Paris	France
2000	Super League	—N/a		First League	Second League	Great Britain	Russia	Gateshead	Great Britain
2001	Super League	—N/a		First League	Second League	Poland	Russia	Bremen	Germany
2002	Super League	—N/a		First League	Second League	Great Britain	Russia	Annecy	France
2003	Super League	—N/a		First League	Second League	France	Russia	Florence	Italy
2004	Super League	—N/a		First League	Second League	Germany	Russia	Bydgoszcz	Poland
2005	Super League	—N/a		First League	Second League	Germany	Russia	Florence	Italy
2006	Super League	—N/a		First League	Second League	France	Russia	Málaga	Spain
2007	Super League	—N/a		First League	Second League	France	Russia	Munich	Germany
2008	Super League	—N/a		First League	Second League	Great Britain	Russia	Annecy	France

== Best performances ==
Below is a list of the events that took place at the championships, and what is the European Cup record, who set it, what country they represented and which year.

=== Men ===
100 m: 10.04 – Linford Christie, Great Britain 1996, 1997
200 m: 20.11 – Linford Christie, Great Britain, 1995
400 m: 44.75 – David Grindley, Great Britain, 1993
800 m: 1:44.28 – Wilson Kipketer, Denmark, 2002
1,500 m: 3:33.63 – José Manuel Abascal, Spain, 1983
3,000 m: 7:41.08 – Dieter Baumann, Germany, 1997
5,000 m: 13:21.68 – Salvatore Antibo, Italy, 1991
10,000 m: 27:32.85 – Fernando Mamede, Portugal, 1983
3,000 m Steeplechase: 8:13.32 – Mariano Scartezzini, Italy, 1981
110 m Hurdles: 13.10 – Colin Jackson, Great Britain, 1993
400 m Hurdles: 47.85 – Harald Schmid, West Germany, 1979, 1985
4 × 100 m Relay: 38.16 – Great Britain (Jason Gardener, Darren Campbell, Marlon Devonish, Julian Golding), 1999
4 × 400 m Relay: 2:59.46 – Great Britain (Roger Black, Jamie Baulch, Ewan Thomas, Mark Richardson), 1997

High Jump: 2.40 m – Patrik Sjöberg, Sweden, 1989
Pole Vault: 6.00 m – Radion Gataullin, Russia, 1993
=Long Jump: 8.38 m – Robert Emmiyan, Soviet Union, 1987
=Long Jump: 8.38 m – Kirill Sosunov, Russia, 1998
Triple Jump: 17.77 m – Khristo Markov, Bulgaria, 1985
Shot put: 22.05 m – Sergey Smirnov, Soviet Union, 1985
Hammer: 82.90 m – Jüri Tamm, Soviet Union, 1985
Discus: 68.76 m – Lars Riedel, Germany, 1995
Javelin: 92.41 m – Aki Parviainen, Finland, 2001

=== Women ===
100 m: 10.77 – Ivet Lalova, Bulgaria 2004
200 m: 21.99 – Silke Gladisch, East Germany, 1987
=400 m: 48.60 – Marita Koch, East Germany, 1979
=400 m: 48.60 – Olga Vladykina, Soviet Union, 1985
800 m: 1:55.91 – Jarmila Kratachvilova, Czechoslovakia, 1985
1,500 m: 3:58.40 – Ravilya Agletdinova, Soviet Union, 1985
3,000 m: 8:35.32 – Zola Budd, Great Britain, 1985
5,000 m: 14:29.11 – Paula Radcliffe, Great Britain, 2004
10,000 m: 31:03.62 – Kathrin Ullrich, Germany, 1991
3,000 m Steeplechase: 9:35.95 – Cristina Casandra, Romania, 2005
110 m Hurdles: 12.47 – Cornelia Oschkenat, East Germany, 1987
400 m Hurdles: 53.38 – Yuliya Pechonkina, Russia, 2002
4 × 100 m Relay: 41.65 – East Germany (Silke Gladisch, Marita Koch, Ingrid Auerswald-Lange, Marlies Göhr), 1985
4 × 400 m Relay: 3:18.58 – Soviet Union (Olga Nazarova, Nadiya Olizarenko, Mariya Pinigina, Olga Vladykina), 1985

High Jump: 2.06 m – Stefka Kostadinova, Bulgaria, 1985
Pole Vault: 4.75 m – Monika Pyrek, Poland, 2006
Long Jump: 7.42 m – Tatyana Kotova, Russia, 2002
Triple Jump: 14.98 m – Tatyana Lebedeva, Russia, 2000
Shot put: 21.56 m – Natalya Lisovskaya, Soviet Union, 1987
Hammer: 76.50 m – Tatyana Lysenko, Russia, 2006
Discus: 73.90 m – Diana Gansky, East Germany, 1987
Javelin: 70.20 m – Christina Obergföll, Germany, 2007

== Hosts ==
#	Year	A Final	B Final
1	1965	(West Germany) Stuttgart (men), Kassel (women)	
2	1967	(Soviet Union) Kiev	
3	1970	(Sweden) Stockholm	
4	1973	(United Kingdom) Edinburgh	
5	1975	(France) Nice	
6	1977	(Finland) Helsinki	(Sweden) Gothenburg (men), (Czechoslovakia) Třinec (women)
7	1979	(Italy) Turin	(Socialist Federal Republic of Yugoslavia) Karlovac (men), (France) Paris (women)
8	1981	(Socialist Federal Republic of Yugoslavia) Zagreb	(Greece) Athens (men), (Italy) Pescara (women)
9	1983	(United Kingdom) London	(Czechoslovakia) Prague (men), (Netherlands) Sittard (women)
10	1985	(Soviet Union) Moscow	(Hungary) Budapest (men), (Hungary) Budapest (women)
11	1987	(Czechoslovakia) Prague	(Sweden) Gothenburg (men), (Sweden) Gothenburg (women)
12	1989	(United Kingdom) Gateshead	(Belgium) Brussels (men), (France) Strasbourg (women)
13	1991	(Germany) Frankfurt	(Spain) Barcelona
14	1993	(Italy) Rome	(Belgium) Brussels
15	1994	(United Kingdom) Birmingham	(Spain) Valencia
16	1995	(France) Villeneuve d'Ascq	(Switzerland) Basel, (Finland) Turku
17	1996	(Spain) Madrid	(Portugal) Lisbon, (Norway) Bergen
18	1997	(Germany) Munich	(Czech Republic) Prague, (Republic of Ireland) Dublin
19	1998	(Russia) St. Petersburg	(Hungary) Budapest, (Sweden) Malmö
20	1999	(France) Paris	(Finland) Lahti, (Greece) Athens
21	2000	(United Kingdom) Gateshead	(Norway) Oslo, (Poland) Bydgoszcz
21	2001	(Germany) Bremen	(Finland) Vaasa, (Hungary) Budapest
22	2002	(France) Annecy	(Slovakia) Banská Bystrica, (Spain) Seville
23	2003	(Italy) Florence	(Finland) Lappeenranta, (Slovenia) Velenje
24	2004	(Poland) Bydgoszcz	(Bulgaria) Plovdiv, (Turkey) Istanbul
25	2005	(Italy) Florence	(Sweden) Gävle, (Portugal) Leiria
26	2006	(Spain) Málaga	(Czech Republic) Prague, (Greece) Thessaloniki
27	2007	(Germany) Munich	(Finland) Vaasa, (Italy) Milan
28	2008	(France) Annecy	(Portugal) Leiria, (Turkey) Istanbul

== Medals (1965–2008) ==
European Cup Finals :

Rank	Nation	Gold	Silver	Bronze	Total
1	Russia	163	112	99	374
2	Great Britain	158	116	117	391
3	Germany	152	198	188	538
4	East Germany	142	85	65	292
5	Soviet Union	100	115	83	298
6	France	96	88	108	292
7	Poland	53	87	99	239
8	Italy	52	62	90	204
9	Spain	30	33	31	94
10	Romania	29	33	26	88
11	Ukraine	25	43	42	110
12	Greece	16	19	25	60
13	Czech Republic	15	18	23	56
14	Bulgaria	11	15	20	46
15	Belarus	10	10	16	36
16	Sweden	9	9	9	27
17	Finland	6	11	14	31
18	Hungary	4	10	16	30
19	Norway	1	2	1	4
20	Belgium	1	0	0	1
20	Slovenia	1	0	0	1
22	Netherlands	0	5	0	5
23	Yugoslavia	0	1	1	2
Totals (23 entries)		1,074	1,072	1,073	3,219

== See also ==
- European Athletics Association
- European Athletics Indoor Cup
- European Athletics Team Championships
- European Champion Clubs Cup (athletics)
- European Champion Clubs Cup for Juniors
- European Champion Clubs Cup Cross Country
