= Joseph Arame =

French sprinter

Medal record

Men's athletics

Representing France

European Championships
Gold medal – first place	1974 Rome	4×100 m

Joseph Arame (born 29 August 1948 in Le Moule, Guadeloupe) is a former French sprinter who specialised in the 200 metres.

He was 5 times French 200 metres champion, as well as Indoor 200 m champion in 1982.

He was a European cup semi-final winner in the 200 in 1977.

He competed at the 1976 Summer Olympics and 1980 Summer Olympics in the 200 m, where both times he reached the semi-final before being eliminated from the event.
