= Siegfried Schenke =

German sprinter

Personal information
- Born: 6 May 1943 (age 83) Sitzendorf, East Germany

Sport
- Sport: Track and field
Medal record
Representing East Germany
European Championships
Bronze medal – third place	1974 Rome	4×100 m
Summer Universiade
Gold medal – first place	1970 Turin	100m
Silver medal – second place	1970 Turin	200m

Siegfried Schenke (born 6 May 1943) is a German former sprinter who specialized in the 200 metres event. He represented East Germany and competed for the club SC Motor Jena. In 1973, he set his personal best records of 10.0 for the 100m and 20.2 for the 200m. His time for the 100m set a European record.

== Achievements ==
Year	Tournament	Venue	Result	Race	Ref.
1970	European Cup	Stockholm, Sweden	2nd	100 m	
1970	European Cup	Stockholm, Sweden	1st	200m	
1970	Universiade	Turin, Italy	1st	100 m	
1970	Universiade	Turin, Italy	2nd	200 m	
1971	European Championships	Helsinki, Finland	4th	100 m	
1971	European Championships	Helsinki, Finland	4th	200 m	
1972	Olympic Games	Munich, West Germany	6th	200 m	
1972	Olympic Games	Munich, West Germany	5th	4 × 100 m relay	
1973	European Cup	Edinburgh, Scotland	1st	100 m	
1974	European Championships	Rome, Italy	3rd	4 × 100 m relay	

Records
Preceded by (East Germany) Hans-Jurgen Bombach	European Record Holder Men's 100 m 29 August 1973 - 22 July 1974	Succeeded by (West Germany) Manfred Ommer
