= Michael Droese =

German sprinter

Medal record

Men's athletics

Representing East Germany

European Championships
Bronze medal – third place	1974 Rome	4×100 m

Michael Droese (born 9 August 1952 in Ueckermünde) is a former sprinter who specialized in the 100 metres. He represented East Germany and competed for the club SC Motor Jena.

He won the bronze medal in 4 × 100 metres relay at the 1974 European Championships together with teammates Manfred Kokot, Hans-Jürgen Bombach and Siegfried Schenke.

== Records ==
Records
Preceded by (Soviet Union) Aleksandr Kornelyuk	European Record Holder Men's 100 m 11 July 1973 - 20 July 1973	Succeeded by (East Germany) Hans-Jurgen Bombach
