= Lyutviyan Mollova =

Bulgarian javelin thrower (1947–2020)

Personal information
- Nationality: Bulgarian
- Born: 18 December 1947 Kazanlak, Bulgaria
- Died: 19 August 2020 (aged 72) Istanbul, Turkey

Sport
- Sport: Athletics
- Event: Javelin throw
Medal record
Representing Bulgaria
Summer Universiade
Bronze medal – third place	1973 Moscow	Javelin throw

Lyutviyan Mollova (Bulgarian: Лютвиян Моллова, 18 December 1947 – 19 August 2020) was a Bulgarian athlete. She competed in the women's javelin throw at the 1972 Summer Olympics.
