= Hans-Joachim Zenk =

German sprinter

Personal information
- Nationality: German
- Born: 3 June 1952 (age 74)

Sport
- Sport: Sprinting
- Event: 200 metres

Hans-Joachim Zenk (born 3 June 1952) is a German sprinter. He competed in the men's 200 metres at the 1972 Summer Olympics representing East Germany.
