= 1974 European Athletics Championships =

11th European Athletics Championships
- The logo of the 1974 European Athletics Championships
- Dates: 2 – 8 September
- Host city: Rome, Italy
- Venue: Stadio Olimpico
- Level: Senior
- Type: Outdoor
- Events: 39
- Participation: 745 athletes from 29 nations

The 11th European Athletics Championships of 1974 were held from 2 September to 8 September in Italy, at Rome's Stadio Olimpico. Contemporaneous reports on the event were given in the Glasgow Herald.

== Men's results ==
Complete results were published.

=== Track ===
1969 |1971 |1974 |1978 |1982

Event	Gold		Silver		Bronze	
100 metres	Valeriy Borzov; Soviet Union	10.27	Pietro Mennea; Italy	10.34	Klaus-Dieter Bieler; West Germany	10.35
200 metres	Pietro Mennea; Italy	20.60	Manfred Ommer; West Germany	20.76	Hans-Jürgen Bombach; East Germany	20.83
400 metres	Karl Honz; West Germany	45.04 CR	David Jenkins; Great Britain	45.67	Bernd Herrmann; West Germany	45.78
800 metres	Luciano Sušanj; Yugoslavia	1:44.07 CR	Steve Ovett; Great Britain	1:45.76	Markku Taskinen; Finland	1:45.89
1500 metres	Klaus-Peter Justus; East Germany	3:40.55	Thomas Hansen; Denmark	3:40.75	Thomas Wessinghage; West Germany	3:41.10
5000 metres	Brendan Foster; Great Britain	13:17.21 CR	Manfred Kuschmann; East Germany	13:23.93	Lasse Virén; Finland	13:24.57
10,000 metres	Manfred Kuschmann; East Germany	28:25.75	Tony Simmons; Great Britain	28:25.79	Giuseppe Cindolo; Italy	28:27.05
Marathon	Ian Thompson; Great Britain	2:13:19	Eckhard Lesse; East Germany	2:14:57	Gaston Roelants; Belgium	2:16:30
20 kilometres walk	Volodymyr Holubnychy; Soviet Union	1:29:30	Bernd Kannenberg; West Germany	1:29:38	Roger Mills; Great Britain	1:32:34
50 kilometres walk	Christoph Höhne; East Germany	3:59:06 CR	Otto Barch; Soviet Union	4:02:39	Peter Selzer; East Germany	4:04:28
110 metres hurdles	Guy Drut; France	13.40 CR	Mirosław Wodzyński; Poland	13.67	Leszek Wodzyński; Poland	13.71
400 metres hurdles	Alan Pascoe; Great Britain	48.82 CR	Jean-Claude Nallet; France	48.94	Yevgeniy Gavrilenko; Soviet Union	49.32
3000 metres steeplechase	Bronisław Malinowski; Poland	8:15.04 CR	Anders Gärderud; Sweden	8:15.41	Michael Karst; West Germany	8:17.91
4 × 100 metres relay	Lucien Sainte-Rose; Joseph Arame; Bruno Cherrier; Dominique Chauvelot; France (FRA)	38.69 CR	Vincenzo Guerini; Norberto Oliosi; Luigi Benedetti; Pietro Mennea; Italy (ITA)	38.88	Manfred Kokot; Michael Droese; Hans-Jürgen Bombach; Siegfried Schenke; East Germany (GDR)	38.99
4 × 400 metres relay	Glen Cohen; William Hartley; Alan Pascoe; David Jenkins; Great Britain (GBR)	3:03.33	Hermann Köhler; Horst-Rüdiger Schlöske; Karl Honz; Rolf Ziegler; West Germany (FRG)	3:03.52	Stig Lönnqvist; Ossi Karttunen; Markku Taskinen; Markku Kukkoaho; Finland (FIN)	3:03.57

=== Field ===
1969 |1971 |1974 |1978 |1982

Event	Gold		Silver		Bronze	
High jump	Jesper Tørring; Denmark	2.25 m CR	Kęstutis Šapka; Soviet Union	2.25 m =CR	Vladimír Malý; Czechoslovakia	2.19 m
Pole vault	Vladimir Kishkun; Soviet Union	5.35 m =CR	Władysław Kozakiewicz; Poland	5.35 m	Yury Isakov; Soviet Union	5.30 m
Long jump	Valeriy Podluzhniy; Soviet Union	8.12 m w	Nenad Stekić; Yugoslavia	8.05 m CR	Yevgeni Schubin; Soviet Union	7.98 m
Triple jump	Viktor Saneyev; Soviet Union	17.23 m CR	Carol Corbu; Romania	16.68 m	Andrzej Sontag; Poland	16.61 m
Shot put	Hartmut Briesenick; East Germany	20.50 m	Ralf Reichenbach; West Germany	20.38 m	Geoff Capes; Great Britain	20.21 m
Discus throw	Pentti Kahma; Finland	63.62 m	Ludvík Daněk; Czechoslovakia	62.76 m	Ricky Bruch; Sweden	62.00 m
Hammer throw	Aleksey Spiridonov; Soviet Union	74.20 m	Jochen Sachse; East Germany	74.00 m	Reinhard Theimer; East Germany	71.62 m
Javelin throw	Hannu Siitonen; Finland	89.58 m	Wolfgang Hanisch; East Germany	85.46 m	Terje Thorslund; Norway	83.68 m
Decathlon	Ryszard Skowronek; Poland	8207 pts CR	Yves Le Roy; France	8146 pts	Guido Kratschmer; West Germany	8132 pts

== Women's results ==
=== Track ===
1969 |1971 |1974 |1978 |1982

Event	Gold		Silver		Bronze	
100 metres	Irena Szewińska; Poland	11.13 CR	Renate Stecher; East Germany	11.23	Andrea Lynch; Great Britain	11.28
200 metres	Irena Szewińska; Poland	22.51 CR	Renate Stecher; East Germany	22.68	Mona-Lisa Pursiainen; Finland	23.17
400 metres	Riitta Salin; Finland	50.14 CR, NR (WR)	Ellen Streidt; East Germany	50.69	Rita Wilden; West Germany	50.88
400 metres	Salin's winning time was interpreted as a World record in 1977, when the IAAF required the results to be accurate to the hundredth. The previous hand-timed record of 49.9 by Irena Szewińska was no longer listed as a World record at that time.					
800 metres	Lilyana Tomova; Bulgaria	1:58.14 CR	Gunhild Hoffmeister; East Germany	1:58.81	Mariana Suman; Romania	1:59.84
1500 metres	Gunhild Hoffmeister; East Germany	4:02.25 CR	Lilyana Tomova; Bulgaria	4:04.97	Grete Andersen; Norway	4:05.21
3000 metres	Nina Holmén; Finland	8:55.10	Lyudmila Bragina; Soviet Union	8:56.09	Joyce Smith; Great Britain	8:57.39
100 metres hurdles	Annelie Ehrhardt; East Germany	12.66 CR	Annerose Fiedler; East Germany	12.89	Teresa Nowak; Poland	12.91
4 × 100 metres relay	Doris Maletzki; Renate Stecher; Christina Heinich; Bärbel Eckert; East Germany (GDR)	42.51 CR, WR	Elfgard Schittenhelm; Annegret Kroniger; Annegret Richter; Inge Helten; West Germany (FRG)	42.75	Ewa Długołęcka; Danuta Jedrejek; Barbara Bakulin; Irena Szewińska; Poland (POL)	43.48
4 × 400 metres relay	Brigitte Rohde; Waltraud Dietsch; Angelika Handt; Ellen Streidt; East Germany (GDR)	3:25.21 CR	Marika Eklund; Mona-Lisa Pursiainen; Pirjo Wilmi; Riitta Salin; Finland (FIN)	3:25.70 NR	Inta Kļimoviča; Ingrīda Barkāne; Nadezhda Kolesnikova; Natalya Sokolova; Soviet Union (URS)	3:26.10

=== Field ===
1969 |1971 |1974 |1978 |1982

Event	Gold		Silver		Bronze	
High jump	Rosemarie Witschas; East Germany	1.95 m CR WR	Milada Karbanová; Czechoslovakia	1.91 m	Sara Simeoni; Italy	1.89 m
Long jump	Ilona Bruzsenyák; Hungary	6.65 m	Eva Šuranová; Czechoslovakia	6.60 m	Pirkko Helenius; Finland	6.59 m
Shot put	Nadezhda Chizhova; Soviet Union	20.78 m CR	Marianne Adam; East Germany	20.43 m	Helena Fibingerová; Czechoslovakia	20.33 m
Discus throw	Faina Melnik; Soviet Union	69.00 m CR	Argentina Menis; Romania	64.62 m	Gabriele Hinzmann; East Germany	62.50 m
Javelin throw	Ruth Fuchs; East Germany	67.22 m CR, WR	Jacqueline Todten; East Germany	62.10 m	Nataša Urbančič; Yugoslavia	61.66 m
Pentathlon	Nadiya Tkachenko; Soviet Union	4776 pts	Burglinde Pollak; East Germany	4678 pts	Zoya Spasovkhodskaya; Soviet Union	4550 pts

== Medal table ==
* Host nation (Italy)

Rank	Nation	Gold	Silver	Bronze	Total
1	East Germany (GDR)	10	12	5	27
2	Soviet Union (URS)	9	3	5	17
3	Great Britain (GBR)	4	3	4	11
4	Poland (POL)	4	2	4	10
5	Finland (FIN)	4	1	5	10
6	France (FRA)	2	2	0	4
7	West Germany (FRG)	1	5	6	12
8	Italy (ITA)*	1	2	2	5
9	Yugoslavia (YUG)	1	1	1	3
10	Bulgaria (BUL)	1	1	0	2
10	Denmark (DEN)	1	1	0	2
12	Hungary (HUN)	1	0	0	1
13	Czechoslovakia (TCH)	0	3	2	5
14	Romania (ROU)	0	2	1	3
15	Sweden (SWE)	0	1	1	2
16	Norway (NOR)	0	0	2	2
17	Belgium (BEL)	0	0	1	1
Totals (17 entries)		39	39	39	117

== Participation ==
According to an unofficial count, 747 athletes from 29 countries participated in the event, two athletes more than the official number of 745 as published.

- Austria (5)
- Belgium (21)
- Bulgaria (25)
- Cyprus (1)
- Czechoslovakia (46)
- Denmark (12)
- East Germany (71)
- Finland (33)
- France (44)
- Gibraltar (1)
- Great Britain (68)
- Greece (12)
- Hungary (21)
- Iceland (2)
- Ireland (7)
- Italy (48)
- Liechtenstein (1)
- Luxembourg (2)
- Netherlands (13)
- Norway (14)
- Poland (56)
- Portugal (4)
- Romania (20)
- Soviet Union (83)
- Spain (17)
- Sweden (33)
- Switzerland (12)
- West Germany (64)
- Yugoslavia (11)
