= Hans-Jürgen Bombach =

East German sprinter

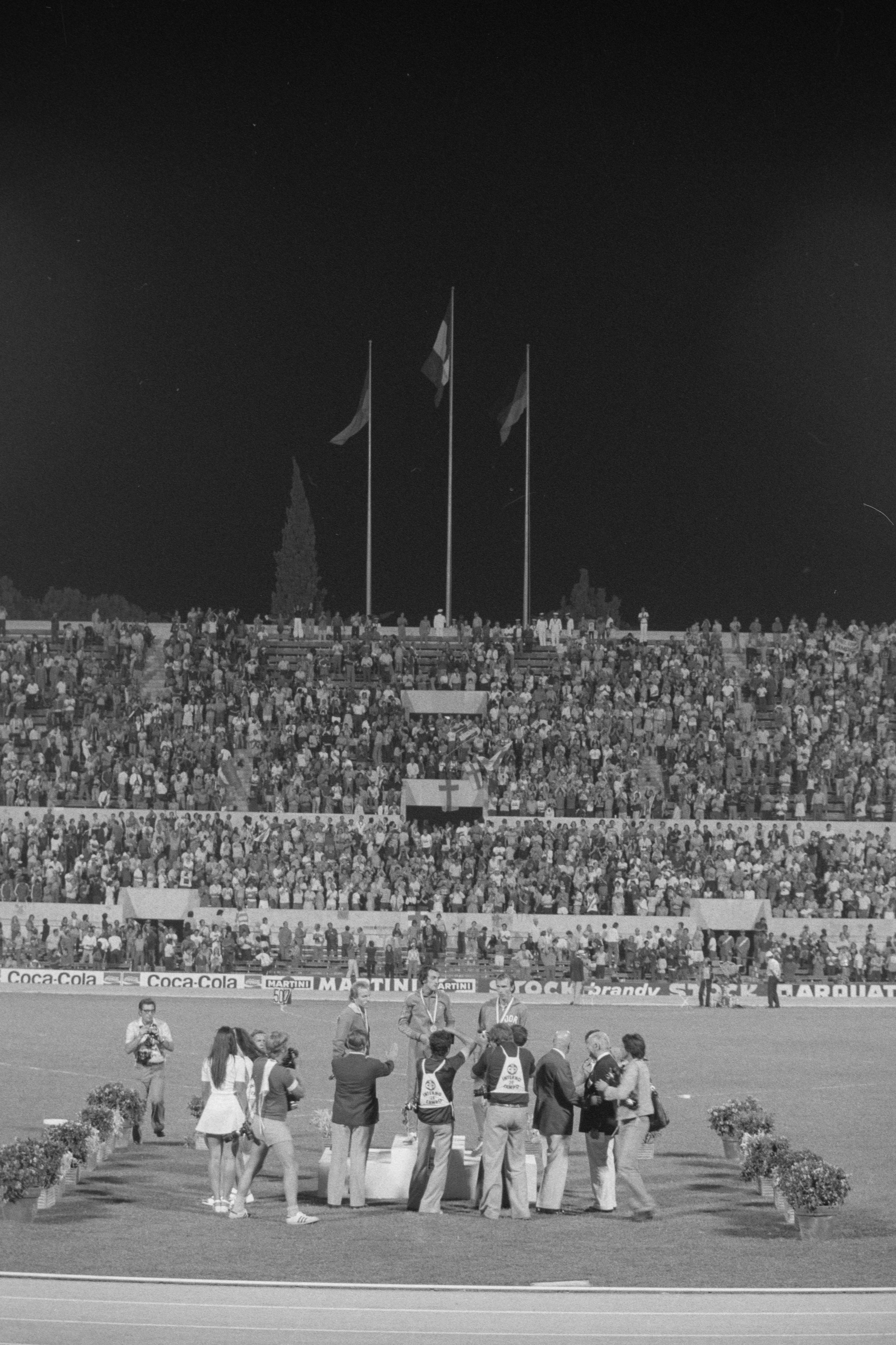
- Hans-Jürgen Bombach (standing on the podium, on the right) after coming third place at the 1974 European Athletics Championships in Rome

Personal information
- National team: East Germany
- Born: 11 August 1945 (age 80)

Sport
- Sport: Sprinting
- Event: 100m 200m
Medal record
Men's athletics
Representing East Germany
European Championships
Bronze medal – third place	1974 Rome	200 m
Bronze medal – third place	1974 Rome	4×100 m

Hans-Jürgen Bombach (born 11 August 1945, in Wehrsdorf) is a former sprinter who specialized in the 100 and 200 metres. He represented East Germany and competed for the club SC Dynamo Berlin.

On 20 July 1973 he established a new European record in 100 metres with 10.0 seconds in Dresden. The next day he ran the 200 m on the same track and set a new East German record of 20.2 seconds.

== Achievements ==
Year	Tournament	Venue	Result	Extra
1969	European Championships	Athens, Greece	4th	200 m
1969	European Championships	Athens, Greece	5th	4 × 100 m relay
1972	Olympic Games	Munich, West Germany	5th	4 × 100 m relay
1974	European Championships	Rome, Italy	3rd	200 m
1974	European Championships	Rome, Italy	3rd	4 × 100 m relay
source: The Olympics

Records
Preceded by (East Germany) Michael Droese	European Record Holder Men's 100m 20 July 1973 – 29 August 1973	Succeeded by (East Germany) Siegfried Schenke
