= Ingrīda Verbele =

Latvian sprinter

Personal information
- Nationality: Latvian
- Born: 18 January 1948 (age 78)

Sport
- Sport: Sprinting
- Event: 400 metres
Medal record
Women's athletics
Representing Soviet Union
European Championships
Bronze medal – third place	1974 Rome	4×400 m
European Indoor Championships
Gold medal – first place	1975 Katowice	4×320 m

Ingrīda Verbele (born 18 January 1948) is a Latvian sprinter. She competed in the women's 400 metres at the 1968 Summer Olympics representing the Soviet Union.
