= Aleksandr Kornelyuk =

Soviet sprinter

Personal information
- Born: 28 June 1950 (age 76) Baku, Soviet Union

Sport
- Sport: Track and field
Medal record
Representing Soviet Union
Olympic Games
Silver medal – second place	1972 Munich	4 × 100 m relay
European Indoor Championships
Silver medal – second place	1972 Grenoble	50 m
Bronze medal – third place	1974 Gothenburg	60 m
Summer Universiade
Bronze medal – third place	1970 Turin	4 × 100 m relay

Aleksandr Olegovich Kornelyuk (Russian: Александр Олегович Корнелюк; born 28 June 1950) was a Soviet athlete who competed mainly in the 100 metres. He trained at Dynamo in Moscow.

Kornelyuk began athletics in 1963 and became a member of the USSR National Team in 1970. He competed for the USSR in the 1972 Summer Olympics held in Munich, Germany in the 4 × 100 metre relay where he won the silver medal with his team mates Vladimir Lovetskiy, Juris Silovs and Valeriy Borzov. Kornelyuk also won a 50 m silver medal at the 1972 European Indoor Championships behind his teammate Borzov.

In 1972 Kornelyuk was awarded the Medal For Labour Heroism.

Records
Preceded by (Finland) Raimo Vilén	European Record Holder Men's 100 m 10 July 1973 – 10 July 1973	Succeeded by (East Germany) Michael Droese
