= Pietro Mennea =

Italian sprinter and politician (1952–2013)

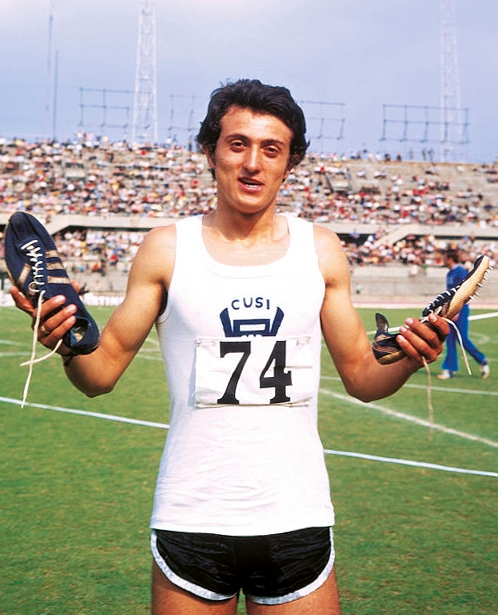
- Pietro Mennea, 1972

Personal information
- Full name: Pietro Paolo Mennea
- Nickname: la Freccia del Sud ("the Arrow of the South")
- Nationality: Italian
- Born: 28 June 1952 Barletta, Apulia, Italy
- Died: 21 March 2013 (aged 60) Rome, Italy
- Height: 1.80 m (5 ft 11 in)
- Weight: 73 kg (161 lb)
- Website: pietromennea.it

Sport
- Country: Italy
- Sport: Track and field
- Events: 100 m, 200 m
- Club: Avis Barletta (1967–1972); Aeronautica Militare (1973); Alco Atalanta Rieti (1974–1976); Fiat C.E. Bari (1977); Fiat Iveco Torino (1978–1980); Capannelle Roma (1984); A.C. Bergamo (1984)
- Coached by: Carlo Vittori
- Retired: 28 September 1988

Achievements and titles
- Personal bests: 100 m: 10.01 (1979); 200 m: 19.72 (1979, AR); 400 m: 45.87 (1977)
Medal record
Men's athletics
Representing Italy
| Event | 1st | 2nd | 3rd |
|---|---|---|---|
| Olympic Games | 1 | 0 | 2 |
| World Championships | 0 | 1 | 1 |
| European Championships | 3 | 2 | 1 |
| European Indoor Championships | 1 | 0 | 0 |
| Mediterranean Games | 8 | 1 | 0 |
| Universiade | 5 | 0 | 2 |
| World Cup | 0 | 1 | 0 |
| European Cup | 3 | 4 | 1 |
| Total | 21 | 9 | 7 |
Olympic Games
| Gold medal – first place | 1980 Moscow | 200 m |
| Bronze medal – third place | 1972 Munich | 200 m |
| Bronze medal – third place | 1980 Moscow | 4 × 400 m |
World Championships
| Silver medal – second place | 1983 Helsinki | 4 × 100 m |
| Bronze medal – third place | 1983 Helsinki | 200 m |
European Championships
| Gold medal – first place | 1974 Rome | 200 m |
| Gold medal – first place | 1978 Prague | 200 m |
| Gold medal – first place | 1978 Prague | 100 m |
| Silver medal – second place | 1974 Rome | 100 m |
| Silver medal – second place | 1974 Rome | 4 × 100 m |
| Bronze medal – third place | 1971 Helsinki | 4 × 100 m |
European Indoor Championships
| Gold medal – first place | 1978 Milan | 400 m |
Summer Universiade
| Gold medal – first place | 1973 Moscow | 200 m |
| Gold medal – first place | 1975 Rome | 100 m |
| Gold medal – first place | 1975 Rome | 200 m |
| Gold medal – first place | 1979 Mexico City | 200 m |
| Gold medal – first place | 1979 Mexico City | 4 × 100 m |
| Bronze medal – third place | 1973 Moscow | 100 m |
| Bronze medal – third place | 1973 Moscow | 4 × 100 m |
Mediterranean Games
| Gold medal – first place | 1971 Izmir | 200 m |
| Gold medal – first place | 1971 Izmir | 4 × 100 |
| Gold medal – first place | 1975 Algiers | 100 m |
| Gold medal – first place | 1975 Algiers | 200 m |
| Gold medal – first place | 1979 Split | 100 m |
| Gold medal – first place | 1979 Split | 4 × 100 m |
| Gold medal – first place | 1983 Casablanca | 200 m |
| Gold medal – first place | 1983 Casablanca | 4 × 100 m |
| Silver medal – second place | 1975 Algiers | 4 × 100 m |
World Cup
| Silver medal – second place | 1977 Düsseldorf | 200 m |

Pietro Paolo Mennea (Italian pronunciation: [ˈpjɛːtro menˈnɛːa]; 28 June 1952 – 21 March 2013), nicknamed la Freccia del Sud ("the Arrow of the South"), was an Italian sprinter and politician. He was most successful in the 200 m event, winning a gold medal at the 1980 Moscow Olympics, and setting a world record at 19.72 seconds in September 1979. This record stood for almost 17 years – the longest duration in the event history – and is still the European record. He is the only male sprinter who has qualified at four consecutive 200 metres Olympic finals: from 1972 to 1984.

== Biography ==
=== Early life ===
Mennea, who was born in Barletta, in the Italian region of Puglia, started his long international athletic career in 1968 when he took part in a junior race in Termoli and he was registered in AVIS Barletta club; in 1971, he won the first of his 14 Italian outdoor titles in the 100 and 200 m. He went on to win two indoor titles in 60 m and 400 m, along with five Mediterranean Games gold medals in 100 m and 200 m. He competed at the European Championships with a third place in the 4 × 100 m relay. He made his Olympic debut at the 1972 Summer Olympics in Munich, where he made the final of the 200 m, his strongest event. He finished in third place, behind Valeri Borzov and Larry Black. Three more consecutive Olympic 200 metre finals would follow later in his career, the longest run ever in this event.

At the 1974 European Championships, Mennea claimed the 200 m gold in front of his home crowd in Rome, while also placing second behind Borzov in the 100 m and the 4 × 100 m. After some poor performances in the 1976 Olympic season, Mennea decided to skip the Olympics, but when the Italian public protested Mennea went to Montreal. He finished fourth in the 200 m and sixth in the 4 × 100 m relay. In 1977, he finished second in the world cup 200, where a photo finish separated him from Clancy Edwards of the United States. He successfully defended his European 200 m title in 1978 but displayed his capabilities in the 100 metres by also winning that event in Prague.

=== 200 metres world record ===
In 1979, Mennea placed first in the 100 metres and second in the 200 m behind Allan Wells of Great Britain in the European Cup. Later in the year, aged 27, he took part in the World University Games, which were held on the high-altitude track of Mexico City. On 12 September 1979, he won the 200 metres with a time of 19.72. His time set a new world record, beating Tommie Smith's time of 19.83 set on the same track in the 1968 Summer Olympics. The record held for almost seventeen years before Michael Johnson broke it at the 1996 U.S. Olympic Trials. As of November 2020, only seventeen athletes have recorded a better time over 200 metres than Mennea. His time stands as the current European record. He also held the low-altitude world record, 19.96, from 1980 to 1983, set in his home town of Barletta. On 17 August 1980, Mennea became the first sprinter to run under 20 seconds for the 200 metres three times.

=== Olympic champion ===
Entering the 1980 Summer Olympics in Moscow, Mennea was a clear favourite for the Olympic gold, in part because of the United States boycott of the Moscow Olympics. In the 200 metre final, Mennea faced reigning champion Don Quarrie and 100 metre champion Allan Wells. Mennea drew the outer most lane with Wells in lane 7 to his inside. Wells got out to a blistering fast start and closed on Mennea within the first 50 m. They approached the straight with Wells more than a two-metre lead on Mennea with Quarrie in second and Silvio Leonard, hampered by his lane 1 draw, in fourth. However, in the straight Mennea gained ground and passed Quarrie and Leonard and at the very end of the race, just beating Wells, winning the gold by a mere 0.02 seconds. Later in the games, he was the anchor man on the Italian bronze medal-winning 4 × 400 relay team. He also competed in the 100 metres, reaching the semi-finals.

=== Last years ===
In 1983, in Cassino, he clocked a manual 14.8 seconds in 150 metres, a world best time that he held until it was bettered by Usain Bolt in Manchester in 2009. Mennea, known in Italy as the la Freccia del Sud ("the Arrow of the South"), then announced his retirement, allowing himself more time for his studies. However, he came back from retirement soon and won a bronze medal in the 200 m at the inaugural World Championships in Helsinki. A year later, he competed in his fourth consecutive Olympic 200 m final, becoming the first person to do so. The defending champion finished in seventh, and retired from athletics for a second time afterwards. Again, Mennea made a comeback, and competed in his fifth Olympics in Seoul, where he was the flag bearer: he qualified for the quarterfinals of the 200 m, but he decided to withdraw from the competition and did not take part into the next round.

Mennea admitted that he had used human growth hormone once during the last year of his career. In an interview to an Italian newspaper in 1987 he told that in 1984, during the Summer Olympics in Los Angeles, an American physiotherapist proposed a doping treatment to him. Back in Italy he tried two injections of human growth hormone but the crisis of conscience he got was so important that it induced him to retire from activity: "I realized that in my life I was looking for everything, except for that." Although the usage of the substance is banned in modern-day competition, it was not banned at the time by the IAAF.

=== After athletics ===
After his athletic career, Mennea worked as a lawyer and a sports agent. He was a member of the European Parliament from 1999 to 2004 elected on the list of The Democrats, but failed in his attempt to be re-elected. He also lobbied for independent doping testing.

=== Death ===
Mennea died on 21 March 2013, in a Rome hospital from pancreatic cancer. He was sixty years old. On the day of his death, the Italian Railways announced that the new superfast train Frecciarossa ETR 1000, entering service in 2014, would carry his name.

== Achievements ==
| Year | Competition | Venue | Position | Event | Time | Notes |
|---|---|---|---|---|---|---|
| 1971 | European Championships | (Finland) Helsinki | 6th | 200 metres | 20.88 | |
| 1971 | European Championships | (Finland) Helsinki | 3rd | 4 × 100 m relay | 39.78 | |
| 1972 | Olympic Games | (Germany) Munich | 3rd | 200 metres | 20.30 | |
| 1972 | Olympic Games | (Germany) Munich | 8th | 4 × 100 m relay | 39.14 | |
| 1974 | European Championships | (Italy) Rome | 2nd | 100 metres | 10.34 | |
| 1974 | European Championships | (Italy) Rome | 1st | 200 metres | 20.60 | |
| 1974 | European Championships | (Italy) Rome | 2nd | 4 × 100 m relay | 38.88 | |
| 1976 | Olympic Games | (Canada) Montreal | 4th | 200 metres | 20.54 | |
| 1976 | Olympic Games | (Canada) Montreal | 6th | 4 × 100 m relay | 39.08 | |
| 1978 | European Indoor Championships | (Italy) Milan | 1st | 400 metres | 46.51 | |
| 1978 | European Championships | (Czechoslovakia) Prague | 1st | 100 metres | 10.27 | |
| 1978 | European Championships | (Czechoslovakia) Prague | 1st | 200 metres | 20.16 | |
| 1978 | European Championships | (Czechoslovakia) Prague | 5th | 4 × 100 m relay | 39.11 | |
| 1978 | European Championships | (Czechoslovakia) Prague | 7th | 4 × 400 m relay | 3:06.7 | |
| 1980 | Olympic Games | (Soviet Union) Moscow | 14th (sf) | 100 metres | 10.58 | |
| 1980 | Olympic Games | (Soviet Union) Moscow | 1st | 200 metres | 20.19 | |
| 1980 | Olympic Games | (Soviet Union) Moscow | 3rd | 4 × 400 m relay | 3:04.54 | |
| 1982 | European Championships | (Greece) Athens | 6th | 4 × 400 m relay | 3:03.21 | |
| 1983 | World Championships | (Finland) Helsinki | 3rd | 200 metres | 20.51 | |
| 1983 | World Championships | (Finland) Helsinki | 2nd | 4 × 100 m relay | 38.37 | |
| 1984 | Olympic Games | (United States) Los Angeles | 7th | 200 metres | 20.55 | |
| 1984 | Olympic Games | (United States) Los Angeles | 4th | 4 × 100 m relay | 38.87 | |
| 1984 | Olympic Games | (United States) Los Angeles | 5th | 4 × 400 m relay | 3:01.44 | |
| 1988 | Olympic Games | Seoul | 40th (qf) | 200 metres | DNS | |

=== Track records ===
As of 6 September 2024, Mennea holds the following track records for 100 metres and 200 metres.

==== 100 metres ====
| Location | Time | Windspeed m/s | Date |
|---|---|---|---|
| Bari | 9.99 | +7.2 | 13/09/1978 |

==== 200 metres ====
| Location | Time | Windspeed m/s | Date | Notes |
|---|---|---|---|---|
| Barletta | 19.96 | 0.0 | 17/08/1980 | |
| Dar El Beïda | 20.30 | +3.2 | 15/09/1983 | |
| Mexico City | 19.72 | +1.8 | 12/09/1979 | This was the world record for 16 years 9 months and remains the European record. |
| Riccione | 20.34 | +2.1 | 26/08/1984 | |

== Personal bests ==
Outdoor

- 100 metres: 10.01 (+0.9 m/s; Mexico City, 4 September 1979)
- 200 metres: 19.72 (+1.8 m/s; Mexico City, 12 September 1979) AR, NR
- 300 metres: 32.23 ( (Italy) Rieti, 21 July 1979)
- 400 metres: 45.87 ( (Italy) Formia, 15 May 1977)

== Honors and awards ==
- On 24 May 2012, the Mayor of Durrës, Vangjush Dako, bestowed upon Mennea the title of honorary citizen of Durrës.
- Furthermore, President of Albania Bamir Topi awarded Pietro Mennea with the "Medal of Gratitude" with citation: "For value and contribution as the former World record holder in Athletics and major figure in the Foundation "Pietro Mennea", created to help sport and research".
- The 2016 edition of "Sport Movies & TV - Milano International FICTS Fest" was dedicated to his memory.
- He also is in the FICTS "Hall of Fame".
- Asteroid 73891 Pietromennea was named in his honor. The official naming citation was published by the Minor Planet Center on 31 January 2018 (M.P.C. 108697).

== See also ==
- Men's 200 metres world record progression
- List of flag bearers for Italy at the Olympics
- Italy national athletics team – Multiple medalists
- Italian all-time lists – 100 metres
- Italian all-time lists – 200 metres
- Italy national relay team
- FIDAL Hall of Fame
- Italy national athletics team – More caps
- List of Italian records in athletics

Records
| Preceded by Tommie Smith | Men's 200 metres world record holder 12 September 1979 – 23 June 1996 | Succeeded by Michael Johnson |
| Preceded by Valeri Borzov | Men's 100 m European record holder 14 September 1979 – 8 June 1984 | Succeeded by Marian Woronin |
| Preceded by Valeri Borzov | Men's 200 m European record holder 10 September 1979 – present | Succeeded by Current holder |
Achievements
| Preceded by Clancy Edwards | Men's 200 m Best Year Performance; 1979–1980 | Succeeded by James Sanford |
Summer Olympics
| Preceded by Sara Simeoni | Flag bearer for Italy; 1988 Seoul | Succeeded by Giuseppe Abbagnale |
