= Raimo Vilén =

Finnish sprinter

Personal information
- Nationality: Finnish
- Born: 10 August 1945 (age 80)

Sport
- Sport: Sprinting
- Event: 100 metres
Medal record
Men's athletics
Representing Finland
European Indoor Championships
Bronze medal – third place	1973 Rotterdam	60 m

Raimo Vilén (born 10 August 1945) is a Finnish sprinter. He competed in the men's 100 metres at the 1972 Summer Olympics.
