= Ossi Karttunen =

Finnish sprinter

Personal information
- Nationality: Finnish
- Born: 17 March 1948 (age 78)

Sport
- Sport: Sprinting
- Event: 400 metres
Medal record
Men's athletics
Representing Finland
European Championships
Bronze medal – third place	1974 Rome	4×400 m

Ossi Karttunen (born 17 March 1948) is a Finnish sprinter. He competed in the men's 400 metres at the 1976 Summer Olympics.
