= Athletics at the 1968 Summer Olympics – Men's 4 × 100 metres relay =

These are the official results of the men's 4 × 100 metres relay event at the 1968 Summer Olympics in Mexico City, Mexico. The event was held on Saturday and Sunday, 19 and 20 October 1968. There were a total number of 19 nations competing. The race was won by the United States in world record time.

During the heats, Jamaica had equalled the world record 38.6 (38.65) and improved upon it in the semi-finals 38.3 (38.39).

The random seeding of the final had semifinal 1 winner, with the fastest time, Jamaica in lane 5, but semifinal 2 winner Cuba in lane one and semifinal 2 runner up United States in lane 2, both regarded as inferior lanes. While Charles Greene got a quick start, USA struggled with poor handoffs so East Germany in lane 4 was the clear leader on the backstretch, with Jamaica and Cuba the closest competitors and Mel Pender racing to catch up. Through the turn Ronnie Ray Smith continued to chase Pablo Montes. East Germany still had the lead going into the final handoff, USA still behind Cuba but with a smooth handoff and France in competitive position. The East Germans took three attempts to finally make a handoff, losing ground. Once with baton in hand Jim Hines was clearly faster than Enrique Figuerola, catching him halfway down the straightaway and on to a two-metre victory. Lennox Miller equally outran Harald Eggers, but Roger Bambuck was able to hold off Miller and dive for the bronze medal for France.

The USA's time was a Fully automatic timing world record that was faster than the hand timed mark from before the Olympics. Miller had been the anchor of that previous record as well as the two Jamaican records earlier in the competition, though the 1967 USC record was never accepted as a world record by the IAAF because Miller was from a different country from his teammates (who included Earl McCullouch and O. J. Simpson).

== Medalists ==
Gold	Silver	Bronze
United States; Charles Greene; Mel Pender; Ronnie Ray Smith; Jim Hines	Cuba; Hermes Ramírez; Juan Morales; Pablo Montes; Enrique Figuerola	France; Gérard Fenouil; Jocelyn Delecour; Claude Piquemal; Roger Bambuck

== Records ==
These were the standing World and Olympic records (in seconds) prior to the 1968 Summer Olympics.

World record	38.4yA	(United States) Earl McCullouch (United States) Fred Kuller (United States) O. J. Simpson (Jamaica) Lennox Miller	Provo (USA)	17 June 1967
Olympic record	39.0	(United States) Paul Drayton (United States) Gerry Ashworth (United States) Richard Stebbins (United States) Bob Hayes	Tokyo (JPN)	21 October 1964

== Results ==
=== Heats ===
- Held on Saturday 19 October 1968

==== Heat 1 ====
RANK	NATION	ATHLETES	TIME (HAND)	TIME (AUTOMATIC)
1.	Cuba	• Hermes Ramírez • Juan Morales • Pablo Montes • Enrique Figuerola	38.7	38.76
2.	United States	• Charlie Greene • Mel Pender • Ronnie Ray Smith • Jim Hines	38.8	38.86
3.	Trinidad and Tobago	• Raymond Fabien • Winston Short • Carl Archer • Edwin Roberts	38.9	38.97
4.	Bahamas	• Jerry Wisdom • Tom Robinson • Bernard Nottage • Edwin Johnson	39.4	39.45
5.	Nigeria	• Timon Oyebami • Robert Ojo • Benedict Majekodunmi • Kola Abdulai	39.4	39.47
6.	Ghana	• Edward Owusu • Mike Ahey • William Quaye • James Addy	39.8	39.87
7.	Dominican Republic	• Luis Soriano • Alberto Torres • Rafael Domínguez • Porfirio Veras	41.4	41.48
–	Puerto Rico		DNS	–

==== Heat 2 ====
RANK	NATION	ATHLETES	TIME (HAND)	TIME (AUTOMATIC)
1.	Jamaica	• Errol Stewart • Mike Fray • Clifton Forbes • Lennox Miller	38.6	38.65
2.	France	• Gérard Fenouil • Jocelyn Delecour • Claude Piquemal • Roger Bambuck	39.0	39.03
3.	West Germany	• Karl-Peter Schmidtke • Gert Metz • Gerhard Wucherer • Jochen Eigenherr	39.1	39.16
4.	Great Britain	• Joseph Speake • Ron Jones • Ralph Banthorpe • Barrie Kelly	39.3	39.33
5.	Ivory Coast	• Atta Kouakou • Kouami N'Dri • Boy Akba Diby • Gaoussou Koné	39.6	39.68
6.	Japan	• Naoki Abe • Hiroomi Yamada • Shinji Ogura • Hideo Iijima	40.0	40.02
7.	Mexico	• Félix Bécquer • Enrique Labadie • Galdino Flores • Miguel Angel González	40.0	40.09

==== Heat 3 ====
RANK	NATION	ATHLETES	TIME (HAND)	TIME (AUTOMATIC)
1.	East Germany	• Heinz Erbstößer • Hartmut Schelter • Peter Haase • Harald Eggers	38.9	38.93
2.	Soviet Union	• Oleksiy Khlopotnov • Yevgeny Sinyayev • Nikolay Ivanov • Vladislav Sapeya	39.0	39.03
3.	Poland	• Wieslaw Maniak • Edward Romanowski • Zenon Nowosz • Marian Dudziak	40.2	40.27
4.	Malaysia	• Mani Jegathesan • Tambusamy Krishnan • Rajalingam Gunaratnam • Ooi Hock Lim	40.6	40.69
5.	Italy	• Sergio Ottolina • Ennio Preatoni • Angelo Sguazzero • Livio Berruti	41.5	41.59
–	Taiwan		DNS	–
–	Switzerland		DNS	–
–	Venezuela		DNS	–

=== Semifinals ===
- Held on Saturday 19 October 1968

==== Heat 1 ====
RANK	NATION	ATHLETES	TIME (HAND)	TIME (AUTOMATIC)
1.	Jamaica	• Errol Stewart • Michael Fray • Clifton Forbes • Lennox Miller	38.3 (WR)	38.39
2.	East Germany	• Heinz Erbstösser • Hartmut Schelter • Peter Haase • Harald Eggers	38.7	38.72
3.	West Germany	• Karl-Peter Schmidtke • Gert Metz • Gerhard Wucherer • Joachim Eigenherr	38.9	38.93
4.	Poland	• Wieslaw Maniak • Edward Romanowski • Zenon Nowosz • Marian Dudziak	38.9	38.99
5.	Great Britain	• Joseph Speake • Ron Jones • Ralph Banthorpe • Barrie Kelly	39.4	39.46
6.	Trinidad and Tobago	• Raymond Fabien • Winston Short • Carl Archer • Edwin Roberts	39.5	39.52
7.	Ivory Coast	• Atta Kouaukou • Kouami N'Dri • Boy Diby • Gaoussou Kone	39.6	39.69
8.	Malaysia	• Mani Jegathesan • Tambusamy Krishnan • Rajalingam Gunaratnam • Ooi Hock Lim	40.8	40.89

==== Heat 2 ====
RANK	NATION	ATHLETES	TIME (HAND)	TIME (AUTOMATIC)
1.	Cuba	• Hermes Ramírez • Juan Morales • Pablo Montes • Enrique Figuerola	38.6	38.64
2.	United States	• Charles Greene • Mel Pender • Ronnie Ray Smith • Jim Hines	38.6	38.69
3.	France	• Gérard Fenouil • Jocelyn Delecour • Claude Piquemal • Roger Bambuck	38.8	38.83
4.	Italy	• Sergio Ottolina • Ennio Preatoni • Angelo Sguazzero • Livio Berruti	39.4	39.46
5.	Ghana	• Edward Owusu • Michael Ahey • William Quaye • James Addy	39.9	39.96
—	Bahamas	• Gerald Wisdom • Thomas Robinson • Bernard Nottage • Edwin Johnson	DQ	–
—	Nigeria	• Timon Oyebami • Robert Ojo • Benedict Majekodunmi • Kola Abdulai	DQ	–
—	Soviet Union	• Aleksey Khlopotnov • Eugeny Siniaev • Nikolay Ivanov • Vladislav Sapeia	DQ	–

=== Final ===
- Held on Sunday 20 October 1968

RANK	NATION	ATHLETES	TIME (HAND)	TIME (AUTOMATIC)
Gold medal	United States	• Charles Greene • Mel Pender • Ronnie Ray Smith • Jim Hines	38.2 (WR)	38.24
Silver medal	Cuba	• Hermes Ramírez • Juan Morales • Pablo Montes • Enrique Figuerola	38.3	38.40
Bronze medal	France	• Gérard Fenouil • Jocelyn Delecour • Claude Piquemal • Roger Bambuck	38.4	38.43
4.	Jamaica	• Errol Stewart • Michael Fray • Clifton Forbes • Lennox Miller	38.4	38.47
5.	East Germany	• Heinz Erbstösser • Hartmut Schelter • Peter Haase • Harald Eggers	38.6	38.66
6.	West Germany	• Karl-Peter Schmidtke • Gert Metz • Gerhard Wucherer • Joachim Eigenherr	38.7	38.76
7.	Italy	• Sergio Ottolina • Ennio Preatoni • Angelo Sguazzero • Livio Berruti	39.2	39.22
8.	Poland	• Wieslaw Maniak • Edward Romanowski • Zenon Nowosz • Marian Dudziak	39.2	39.22
