= Athletics at the 1970 Summer Universiade – Men's 4 × 100 metres relay =

The men's 4 × 100 metres relay event at the 1970 Summer Universiade was held at the Stadio Comunale in Turin on 5 and 6 September 1970.

== Records ==
Standing records prior to the 1970 Summer Universiade
World record	United States	38.2	Mexico City, Mexico	20 October 1968
Universiade record	Italy	39.8	Tokyo, Japan	1967

== Results ==
=== Heats ===
Rank	Heat	Nation	Athletes	Time	Notes
1	1	United States	Jim Green, Tommie Turner, Ron Draper, Roger Colglazier	40.5	Q
2	1	Italy	Giovanni Lai, Ennio Preatoni, Franco Ossola, Pasqualino Abeti	40.7	Q
3	1	Ivory Coast	Allechi Alliko, Hauhout Assamo, Gaoussou Koné, Amadou Meïté	41.0	
4	1	Australia	Mal Baird, Alan Bradshaw, David Stokes, Lawrie Walkley	41.1	
5	1	Madagascar	Augustin Miadana, Jean-Aime Randrianalijaona, Henri Rafaralahy, Jean-Louis Ravelomamantsoa	41.7	
1	2	West Germany	Günther Nickel, Klaus-Dieter Bieler, Günther Rudolph, Joachim Eigenherr	39.9	Q
2	2	Cuba	Bárbaro Bandomo, Juan Morales, Pablo Montes, José Triana Matamoros	40.1	Q
3	2	France	Jacques Broux, Patrick Bourbeillon, Charles Ducasse, Jean-Pierre Carette	40.2	q
4	2	Spain	Julián Marco, Pedro Aguadé, José Luis Sánchez Paraíso, Juan Carlos Jones	41.4	
5	2	Nigeria	A. Otusanya, Ethelbert Nwagbo, David Urhobo Tonitse, O. T. Kelani	41.9	
6	2	Kuwait	Thanyan Al-Ghanim, Abdulghalil Al-Kassim, Abdulaziz Al-Hadba, Abdulrahman Al-Kaoud	45.8	
	2	Congo	Antoine Nkounkou, Louis Nkanza, Rigobert David Ibata, Jean-Pierre Bassegela	DQ	
1	3	Poland	Stanisław Wagner, Gerard Gramse, Jan Werner, Zenon Nowosz	39.7	Q, UR
2	3	Soviet Union	Aleksandr Kornelyuk, Vladislav Sapeya, Boris Izmestyev, Valentin Maslakov	40.2	Q
3	3	Great Britain	Ian Green, Martin Reynolds, John Williams, Ralph Banthorpe	40.2	q
4	3	Japan	Masahide Jinno, Naoki Abe, Kyoichiro Inoue, Shinji Ogura	41.1	
5	3	Austria	Erich Bonesch, Gert Herunter, Axel Nepraunik, Peter Culk	41.6	
6	3	Portugal	Abreu Matos, Carlos Cardoso, Fernando Lamy de Fortuna, Mario Oliveira	42.2	

=== Final ===
Rank	Nation	Athletes	Time	Notes
1st place, gold medalist(s)	Poland	Stanisław Wagner, Jan Werner, Gerard Gramse, Zenon Nowosz	39.2	UR
2nd place, silver medalist(s)	Cuba	Bárbaro Bandomo, Juan Morales, Pablo Montes, José Triana	39.2	
3rd place, bronze medalist(s)	Soviet Union	Aleksandr Kornelyuk, Vladislav Sapeya, Boris Izmestyev, Valentin Maslakov	39.4	
4	France	Jacques Broux, Patrick Bourbeillon, Charles Ducasse, Jean-Pierre Carette	39.7	
5	West Germany	Günther Nickel, Klaus-Dieter Bieler, Günther Rudolph, Joachim Eigenherr	39.7	
6	Great Britain	Ian Green, Martin Reynolds, John Williams, Ralph Banthorpe	40.0	
7	Italy	Francesco Zandano, Ennio Preatoni, Franco Ossola, Pasqualino Abeti	40.0	
8	United States	Ron Draper, Roger Colglazier, Jim Green, Tommie Turner	40.2	
