= Athletics at the 1970 Summer Universiade – Men's 200 metres =

The men's 200 metres event at the 1970 Summer Universiade was held at the Stadio Comunale in Turin on 5 and 6 September 1970.

== Medalists ==
| Gold | Silver | Bronze |
|---|---|---|
| Martin Reynolds; Great Britain | Siegfried Schenke; East Germany | Jim Green; United States |

== Results ==
=== Heats ===
Held on 5 September

Wind:
Heat 1: -1.0 m/s, Heat 2: ? m/s, Heat 3: -0.5 m/s, Heat 4: 0.0 m/s, Heat 5: ? m/s, Heat 6: 0.0 m/s

| Rank | Heat | Athlete | Nationality | Time | Notes |
|---|---|---|---|---|---|
| 1 | 1 | Martin Reynolds | Great Britain | 21.0 | Q |
| 2 | 1 | David Stokes | Australia | 21.3 | Q |
| 3 | 1 | Pasqualino Abeti | Italy | 21.5 | q |
| 4 | 1 | Brendan O'Regan | Ireland | 22.1 | |
| 5 | 1 | Noureddine Brahimi | Algeria | 22.4 | |
| 6 | 1 | Mario Oliveira | Portugal | 22.7 | |
| 6 | 1 | Abdulrahman Al-Kaoud | Kuwait | 24.0 | |
| 1 | 2 | Jan Werner | Poland | 21.1 | Q |
| 2 | 2 | Ralph Banthorpe | Great Britain | 21.3 | Q |
| 3 | 2 | Jiří Kynos | Czechoslovakia | 21.3 | q |
| 4 | 2 | Amadou Meïté | Ivory Coast | 21.6 | |
| 5 | 2 | Franco Ossola | Italy | 21.7 | |
| 6 | 2 | O. T. Kelani | Nigeria | 22.1 | |
| 7 | 2 | Carlos Cardoso | Portugal | 22.5 | |
| 8 | 2 | Philippe Clerc | Switzerland | 23.2 | |
| 1 | 3 | Alan Bradshaw | Australia | 21.8 | Q |
| 2 | 3 | Jean-Pierre Bassegela | Congo | 21.9 | Q |
| 3 | 3 | Axel Nepraunik | Austria | 22.2 | |
| 4 | 3 | Hamouda El-Fray | Tunisia | 22.2 | |
| 5 | 3 | Ertuğrul Oğulbulan | Turkey | 22.3 | |
| 6 | 3 | Abdulghalil Al-Kassim | Kuwait | 24.2 | |
| 1 | 4 | Jim Green | United States | 21.2 | Q |
| 2 | 4 | Charles Ducasse | France | 21.5 | Q |
| 3 | 4 | József Fügedi | Hungary | 21.5 | q |
| 4 | 4 | Pablo Bandomo | Cuba | 21.7 | |
| 5 | 4 | Reto Diezi | Switzerland | 21.7 | |
| 6 | 4 | Horst Schmude | West Germany | 22.0 | |
| 7 | 4 | D. O. Iyiewuare | Nigeria | 22.1 | |
| 8 | 4 | Henri Rafaralahy | Madagascar | 22.5 | |
| 1 | 5 | Siegfried Schenke | East Germany | 21.4 | Q |
| 2 | 5 | Ramón Magariños | Spain | 21.4 | Q |
| 3 | 5 | Valentin Maslakov | Soviet Union | 21.6 | |
| 4 | 5 | Michel Charland | Canada | 22.0 | |
| 5 | 5 | Salah Ghadri | Tunisia | 22.3 | |
| 6 | 5 | Kouassi Gnamien | Ivory Coast | 22.5 | |
| 7 | 5 | Juan Argüello | Nicaragua | 23.2 | |
| 1 | 6 | Jochen Eigenherr | West Germany | 21.4 | Q |
| 2 | 6 | István Bátori | Hungary | 21.5 | Q |
| 3 | 6 | Porfirio Veras | Dominican Republic | 21.6 | q |
| 4 | 6 | Masahide Jinno | Japan | 21.9 | |
| 5 | 6 | Christian Nicolau | France | 21.9 | |
| 6 | 6 | Erich Bonesch | Austria | 21.9 | |
| | 6 | Louis Nkanza | Congo | DNF | |

=== Semifinals ===
Held on 6 September

Wind:
Heat 1: -0.4 m/s, Heat 2: 0.0 m/s

| Rank | Heat | Athlete | Nationality | Time | Notes |
|---|---|---|---|---|---|
| 1 | 1 | Martin Reynolds | Great Britain | 21.0 | Q |
| 2 | 1 | Jiří Kynos | Czechoslovakia | 21.2 | Q |
| 3 | 1 | Charles Ducasse | France | 21.2 | Q |
| 4 | 1 | Siegfried Schenke | East Germany | 21.2 | Q |
| 5 | 1 | József Fügedi | Hungary | 21.4 | |
| 6 | 1 | David Stokes | Australia | 21.4 | |
| 7 | 1 | Porfirio Veras | Dominican Republic | 21.7 | |
| 8 | 1 | Jean-Pierre Bassegela | Congo | 22.2 | |
| 1 | 2 | Jan Werner | Poland | 21.1 | Q |
| 2 | 2 | Jim Green | United States | 21.1 | Q |
| 3 | 2 | Ralph Banthorpe | Great Britain | 21.3 | Q |
| 4 | 2 | Ramón Magariños | Spain | 21.5 | Q |
| 5 | 2 | Pasqualino Abeti | Italy | 21.6 | |
| 6 | 2 | István Bátori | Hungary | 21.6 | |
| 7 | 2 | Alan Bradshaw | Australia | 21.9 | |
| | 2 | Jochen Eigenherr | West Germany | ? | |

=== Final ===
Held on 6 September

Wind: 0.0 m/s

| Rank | Name | Nationality | Time | Notes |
|---|---|---|---|---|
| 1st place, gold medalist(s) | Martin Reynolds | Great Britain | 21.0 | |
| 2nd place, silver medalist(s) | Siegfried Schenke | East Germany | 21.0 | |
| 3rd place, bronze medalist(s) | Jim Green | United States | 21.1 | |
| 4 | Jan Werner | Poland | 21.2 | |
| 5 | Jiří Kynos | Czechoslovakia | 21.3 | |
| 6 | Ramón Magariños | Spain | 21.4 | |
| 7 | Charles Ducasse | France | 21.4 | |
| 8 | Ralph Banthorpe | Great Britain | 21.6 | |
