= Athletics at the 1970 Summer Universiade – Men's 100 metres =

The men's 100 metres event at the 1970 Summer Universiade was held at the Stadio Comunale in Turin on 2 and 3 September 1970.

== Medalists ==
Gold	Silver	Bronze
Siegfried Schenke; East Germany	Jim Green; United States	Jean-Louis Ravelomanantsoa; Madagascar

== Results ==
=== Heats ===
Held on 2 September

Wind:
Heat 1: +0.7 m/s, Heat 2: +0.2 m/s, Heat 3: +1.4 m/s, Heat 4: +2.7 m/s, Heat 5: +1.5 m/s, Heat 6: 0.0 m/s, Heat 7: +0.5 m/s

Rank	Heat	Athlete	Nationality	Time	Notes
1	1	José Triana	Cuba	10.3	Q
2	1	Willie Polk	United States	10.4	Q
3	1	Juan Carlos Jones	Spain	10.4	q
4	1	Porfirio Veras	Dominican Republic	10.5	q
5	1	Jiří Kynos	Czechoslovakia	10.5	q
6	1	Masahide Jinno	Japan	10.5	q
7	1	O.T. Kelani	Nigeria	10.7	
1	2	Jim Green	United States	10.5	Q
2	2	Gaoussou Koné	Ivory Coast	10.6	Q
3	2	Georgi Yovchev	Bulgaria	10.8	
4	2	Stanisław Wagner	Poland	10.9	
5	2	Brendan O'Regan	Ireland	11.0	
6	2	Hamouda El-Fray	Tunisia	11.0	
7	2	A. Otusanya	Nigeria	11.0	
1	3	Siegfried Schenke	East Germany	10.4	Q
2	3	Aleksandr Kornelyuk	Soviet Union	10.5	Q
3	3	Naoki Abe	Japan	10.6	q
4	3	Jean-Pierre Bassegela	Congo	10.7	
5	3	Mandy Djite	Senegal	10.7	
6	3	Axel Nepraunik	Austria	10.9	
7	3	Albert Van Hoorn	Belgium	11.1	
8	3	Abdulrahman Al-Kaoud	Kuwait	11.8	
1	4	Philippe Clerc	Switzerland	10.4	Q
2	4	Jean-Louis Ravelomanantsoa	Madagascar	10.4	Q
3	4	Günther Rudolph	West Germany	10.5	q
4	4	Amadou Meïté	Ivory Coast	10.7	
5	4	John Williams	Great Britain	10.8	
6	4	Ertuğrul Oğulbulan	Turkey	10.8	
7	4	Juan Argüello	Nicaragua	11.1	
8	4	Thanyan Al-Ghanim	Kuwait	11.9	
1	5	Pablo Montes	Cuba	10.3	Q
2	5	Klaus-Dieter Bieler	West Germany	10.5	Q
2	5	Patrick Bourbeillon	France	10.5	Q
4	5	Augustin Miadana	Madagascar	10.6	q
5	5	Ivica Karasi	Yugoslavia	10.6	q
6	5	Michel Charland	Canada	10.8	
7	5	Paulo Matschinske	Brazil	11.0	
8	5	Peter Culk	Austria	11.0	
1	6	Zenon Nowosz	Poland	10.5	Q
2	6	Jacques Broux	France	10.7	Q
3	6	Alan Bradshaw	Australia	10.7	
4	6	Admilson Chitarra	Brazil	10.7	
5	6	István Bátori	Hungary	10.8	
6	6	Ennio Preatoni	Italy	10.9	
7	6	Antonio Manso	Portugal	11.2	
7	6	Salah Ghadri	Tunisia	11.3	
1	7	Ian Green	Great Britain	10.5	Q
2	7	David Stokes	Australia	10.5	Q
3	7	Vladislav Sapeya	Soviet Union	10.7	q
4	7	Francesco Zandano	Italy	10.8	
5	7	József Fügedi	Hungary	10.8	
6	7	Antoine Nkounkou	Congo	10.8	
7	7	Fernando Lamy de Fortuna	Portugal	11.2	
8	7	Arthur Azizarshadi	Iran	11.4	

=== Semifinals ===
Held on 3 September

Wind:
Heat 1: +1.8 m/s, Heat 2: +1.2 m/s, Heat 3: ? m/s

Rank	Heat	Athlete	Nationality	Time	Notes
1	1	José Triana	Cuba	10.4	Q
2	1	Jean-Louis Ravelomanantsoa	Madagascar	10.4	Q
3	1	Philippe Clerc	Switzerland	10.4	q
4	1	Ian Green	Great Britain	10.4	q
5	1	David Stokes	Australia	10.5	
6	1	Jacques Broux	France	10.7	
	1	Naoki Abe	Japan	?	
	1	Porfirio Veras	Dominican Republic	?	
1	2	Jim Green	United States	10.4	Q
2	2	Pablo Montes	Cuba	10.5	Q
3	2	Klaus-Dieter Bieler	West Germany	10.5	
3	2	Patrick Bourbeillon	France	10.5	
5	2	Günther Rudolph	West Germany	10.6	
6	2	Juan Carlos Jones	Spain	10.6	
7	2	Vladislav Sapeya	Soviet Union	10.6	
8	2	Ivica Karasi	Yugoslavia	10.7	
1	3	Siegfried Schenke	East Germany	10.3	Q
2	3	Zenon Nowosz	Poland	10.4	Q
3	3	Gaoussou Koné	Ivory Coast	10.5	
4	3	Aleksandr Kornelyuk	Soviet Union	10.5	
5	3	Willie Polk	United States	10.5	
6	3	Augustin Miadana	Madagascar	10.6	
7	3	Jiří Kynos	Czechoslovakia	10.7	
8	3	Masahide Jinno	Japan	10.7	

=== Final ===
Held on 3 September

Wind: 0.0 m/s

Rank	Name	Nationality	Time	Notes
1st place, gold medalist(s)	Siegfried Schenke	East Germany	10.5	
2nd place, silver medalist(s)	Jim Green	United States	10.5	
3rd place, bronze medalist(s)	Jean-Louis Ravelomanantsoa	Madagascar	10.5	
4	Zenon Nowosz	Poland	10.6	
5	José Triana	Cuba	10.6	
6	Pablo Montes	Cuba	10.6	
7	Ian Green	Great Britain	10.6	
8	Philippe Clerc	Switzerland	10.8	
