= Athletics at the 1968 Summer Olympics – Men's 200 metres =

Men's 200 metres at the Games of the XIX Olympiad
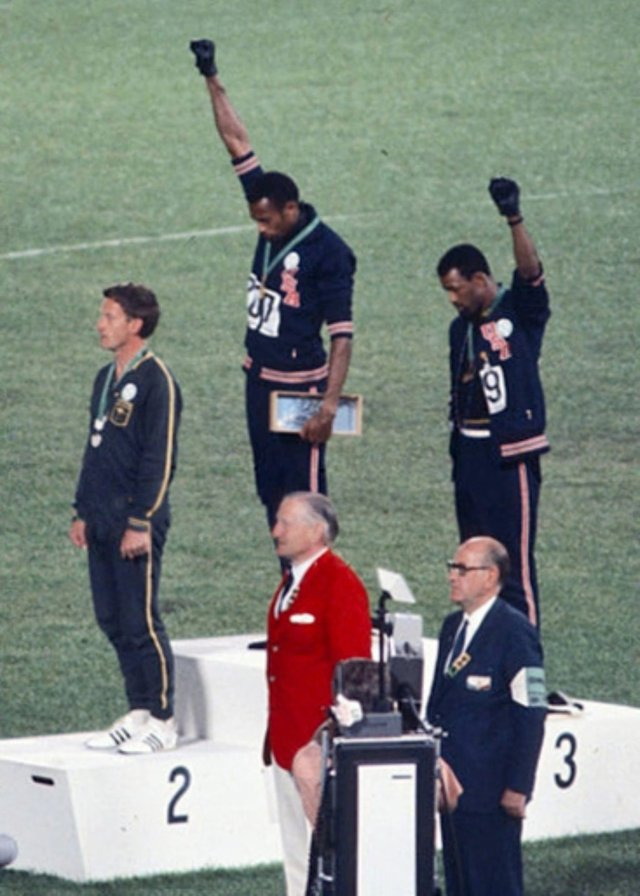
- The medal award ceremony for the 200 metres. Tommie Smith (center) and John Carlos (right) showing the Black Power salute while silver medalist Peter Norman (left) wears an OPHR badge to show his support for the two Americans.
- Venue: Estadio Olímpico Universitario
- Dates: 15–16 October 1968
- Competitors: 50 from 37 nations
- Winning time: 19.83 WR

Medalists
1st place, gold medalist(s)		Tommie Smith; United States
2nd place, silver medalist(s)		Peter Norman; Australia
3rd place, bronze medalist(s)		John Carlos; United States

The men's 200 metres event at the 1968 Summer Olympics was held in Mexico City, Mexico. The final was won by 0.23 seconds by Tommie Smith in a time of 19.83, a new world record. However, the race is perhaps best known for what happened during the medal ceremony – the Black Power salute of Smith and bronze medallist John Carlos. The background, consequences, and legacy of the salute carried forward into subsequent Olympics and is perhaps the single most memorable event from these Olympics.

The event started on 15 October and finished on 16 October. There were 50 athletes from 37 nations competing. The maximum number of athletes per nation had been set at 3 since the 1930 Olympic Congress. Smith's win was the second consecutive and 12th overall for the United States. Peter Norman's medal was the second for Australia in the men's 200 metres, after Stan Rowley's bronze 68 years earlier.

== Background ==
This was the 15th appearance of the event, which was not held at the first Olympics in 1896 but has been on the program ever since. Three of the eight finalists from the 1964 Games returned: bronze medalist Edwin Roberts of Trinidad and Tobago, fourth-place finisher Harry Jerome of Canada, and fifth-place finisher (and 1960 gold medalist) Livio Berruti of Italy.

Tommie Smith was the 1967 and 1968 AAU champion; John Carlos was the 1967 Pan American Games and 1968 U.S. Olympic trials winners (with a time that would have been a world record, but was not ratified because his shoes had too many spikes). The two were heavily favored, though had considered boycotting the Olympics to protest racial inequality in the United States.

Barbados, British Honduras (Belize), the Dominican Republic, El Salvador, West Germany, Honduras, Nicaragua, Sudan, Tanzania, and the Virgin Islands each made their debut in the event. The United States made its 15th appearance, the only nation to have competed at each edition of the 200 metres to date.

== Competition format ==
The competition used the four round format introduced in 1920: heats, quarterfinals, semifinals, and a final. The "fastest loser" system introduced in 1960 was used again in the heats.

There were 7 heats of between 7 and 8 runners each, with the top 4 men in each advancing to the quarterfinals along with the next 4 fastest overall. The quarterfinals consisted of 4 heats of 8 athletes each; the 4 fastest men in each heat advanced to the semifinals. There were 2 semifinals, each with 8 runners. Again, the top 4 athletes advanced. The final had 8 runners. The races were run on a 400-metre track.

== Records ==
Prior to the competition, the existing world and Olympic records were as follows.

World record	Tommie Smith (USA)	20.0y	Sacramento, United States	11 June 1966
Olympic record	Henry Carr (USA)	20.3	Tokyo, Japan	17 October 1964

Tommie Smith's 20.3 / 20.37 in the second heat matched the hand-timed Olympic record. Peter Norman broke that record with a 20.2 / 20.23 in the sixth heat. Smith's time in the third quarterfinal was 20.2 / 20.28, equaling the record. Mike Fray matched the old 20.3 second record in the fourth quarterfinal. In the first semifinal, Norman again ran a 20.2 (/ 20.22) but was behind John Carlos at 20.1 / 20.12 for another new Olympic record. Smith matched Carlos's hand-timing in the second semifinal, with 20.1 / 20.14. Smith then broke the 20-second barrier in the final, recording 19.8 hand-timed and 19.83 auto-timed for a new world record.

== Schedule ==
All times are Central Standard Time (UTC-6)

Date	Time	Round
Tuesday, 15 October 1968	10:30; 15:40	Heats; Quarterfinals
Wednesday, 16 October 1968	15:20; 17:50	Semifinals; Final

== Results ==
=== Heats ===
==== Heat 1 ====
Wind: 0.0 m/s

Rank	Athlete	Nation	Time	Notes
1	John Carlos	United States	20.54	Q
2	Andrés Calonge	Argentina	20.81	Q
3	Mani Jegathesan	Malaysia	20.92	Q, NR
4	Livio Berruti	Italy	21.06	Q
5	Valentin Maslakov	Soviet Union	21.07	q
6	Norman Chihota	Tanzania	21.28	
7	Canagasabai Kunalan	Singapore	21.39	
8	Hadley Hinds	Barbados	22.35	

==== Heat 2 ====
Wind: +0.5 m/s

Rank	Athlete	Nation	Time	Notes
1	Tommie Smith	United States	20.37	Q, =OR
2	Charles Asati	Kenya	20.66	Q
3	Jochen Eigenherr	West Germany	20.69	Q
4	Edwin Roberts	Trinidad and Tobago	20.69	Q
5	David Ejoke	Nigeria	21.09	q
6	Edwin Johnson	Bahamas	21.22	q
7	Kun Min-mu	Taiwan	22.44	
	Pablo Montes	Cuba	DNS	

|}

==== Heat 3 ====
Wind: 0.0 m/s

Rank	Athlete	Nation	Time	Notes
1	Larry Questad	United States	20.75	Q
2	Julius Sang	Kenya	20.90	Q
3	Edward Romanowski	Poland	20.95	Q
4	Miguel Angel González	Mexico	21.31	Q
5	Jean-Louis Ravelomanantsoa	Madagascar	21.53	
6	Norris Stubbs	Bahamas	21.64	
7	Morgan Gesmalla	Sudan	22.70	

==== Heat 4 ====
Wind: 0.0 m/s

Rank	Athlete	Nation	Time	Notes
1	Mike Fray	Jamaica	20.62	Q
2	Winston Short	Trinidad and Tobago	21.00	Q
3	Hansruedi Wiedmer	Switzerland	21.06	Q
4	Bernard Nottage	Bahamas	21.31	Q
5	Philippe Housiaux	Belgium	21.41	
6	Porfirio Veras	Dominican Republic	21.53	
7	Juan Argüello	Nicaragua	22.80	

==== Heat 5 ====
Wind: 0.0 m/s

Rank	Athlete	Nation	Time	Notes
1	Iván Moreno	Chile	20.93	Q
2	Jacques Carette	France	20.97	Q
3	James Addy	Ghana	21.00	Q
4	Fernando Acevedo	Peru	21.02	Q
5	Harry Jerome	Canada	21.22	q
6	William Dralu	Uganda	21.38	
7	Colin Thurton	British Honduras	22.14	
	Lennox Miller	Jamaica	DNS	

==== Heat 6 ====
Wind: +1.2 m/s

Rank	Athlete	Nation	Time	Notes
1	Peter Norman	Australia	20.17	Q, OR
2	Roger Bambuck	France	20.61	Q
3	Dick Steane	Great Britain	20.66	Q
4	Rajalingam Gunaratnam	Malaysia	21.58	Q
5	Alberto Torres	Dominican Republic	21.99	
6	José Astacio	El Salvador	23.13	
—	Juan Franceschi	Puerto Rico	DNF	
	Ito Giani	Italy	DNS	

==== Heat 7 ====
Wind: +1.0 m/s

Rank	Athlete	Nation	Time	Notes
1	Greg Lewis	Australia	20.71	Q
2	Ralph Banthorpe	Great Britain	20.73	Q
3	Nikolay Ivanov	Soviet Union	20.78	Q
4	Pedro Grajales	Colombia	21.07	Q
5	Gert Metz	West Germany	21.24	
6	Carl Plaskett	Virgin Islands	21.29	
7	Cristóbal Corrales	Honduras	23.93	
	Hassan El-Mech	Morocco	DNS	

=== Quarterfinals ===
==== Quarterfinal 1 ====
Wind: 0.0 m/s

Rank	Athlete	Nation	Time	Notes
1	John Carlos	United States	20.69	Q
2	Greg Lewis	Australia	20.81	Q
3	Dick Steane	Great Britain	20.81	Q
4	Mani Jegathesan	Malaysia	21.01	Q
5	Julius Sang	Kenya	21.04	
6	Jacques Carette	France	21.15	
7	Edwin Johnson	Bahamas	21.41	
8	Harry Jerome	Canada	21.43	

==== Quarterfinal 2 ====
Wind: 0.0 m/s

Rank	Athlete	Nation	Time	Notes
1	Peter Norman	Australia	20.44	Q
2	Jochen Eigenherr	West Germany	20.53	Q
3	Fernando Acevedo	Peru	20.78	Q
4	Iván Moreno	Chile	20.83	Q
5	Charles Asati	Kenya	20.84	
6	Livio Berruti	Italy	21.01	
7	Winston Short	Trinidad and Tobago	21.51	
8	Rajalingam Gunaratnam	Malaysia	21.52	

==== Quarterfinal 3 ====
Wind: 0.0 m/s

Rank	Athlete	Nation	Time	Notes
1	Tommie Smith	United States	20.28	Q, =OR
2	Edwin Roberts	Trinidad and Tobago	20.50	Q
3	Edward Romanowski	Poland	20.85	Q
4	Nikolay Ivanov	Soviet Union	20.90	Q
5	David Ejoke	Nigeria	20.99	
6	Andrés Calonge	Argentina	21.03	
7	Hansruedi Wiedmer	Switzerland	21.42	
8	Miguel Angel González	Mexico	21.57	

==== Quarterfinal 4 ====
Wind: 0.0 m/s

Rank	Athlete	Nation	Time	Notes
1	Mike Fray	Jamaica	20.39	Q
2	Larry Questad	United States	20.54	Q
3	Roger Bambuck	France	20.63	Q
4	Ralph Banthorpe	Great Britain	20.83	Q
5	James Addy	Ghana	20.90	
6	Valentin Maslakov	Soviet Union	20.96	
7	Pedro Grajales	Colombia	21.05	
8	Bernard Nottage	Bahamas	21.53	

=== Semifinals ===
==== Semifinal 1 ====
Wind: +0.2 m/s

Rank	Athlete	Nation	Time	Notes
1	John Carlos	United States	20.12	Q, OR
2	Peter Norman	Australia	20.22	Q
3	Mike Fray	Jamaica	20.46	Q
4	Roger Bambuck	France	20.47	Q
5	Iván Moreno	Chile	20.84	
6	Dick Steane	Great Britain	20.85	
7	Nikolay Ivanov	Soviet Union	20.89	
8	Fernando Acevedo	Peru	20.91	

==== Semifinal 2 ====
Wind: +0.6 m/s

Rank	Athlete	Nation	Time	Notes
1	Tommie Smith	United States	20.14	Q, =OR
2	Edwin Roberts	Trinidad and Tobago	20.44	Q
3	Larry Questad	United States	20.48	Q
4	Jochen Eigenherr	West Germany	20.49	Q
5	Greg Lewis	Australia	20.53	
6	Edward Romanowski	Poland	20.80	
7	Ralph Banthorpe	Great Britain	20.88	
8	Mani Jegathesan	Malaysia	21.05	

=== Final ===
Wind: +0.9 m/s

Rank	Athlete	Nation	Time	Notes
1st place, gold medalist(s)	Tommie Smith	United States	19.83	WR
2nd place, silver medalist(s)	Peter Norman	Australia	20.06	NR
3rd place, bronze medalist(s)	John Carlos	United States	20.10	
4	Edwin Roberts	Trinidad and Tobago	20.34	
5	Roger Bambuck	France	20.51	
6	Larry Questad	United States	20.62	
7	Mike Fray	Jamaica	20.63	
8	Jochen Eigenherr	West Germany	20.66	
