= 1969 European Athletics Championships – Men's 4 × 100 metres relay =

Men's 4 × 100 metres relay at the European Athletics Championships

The men's 4 × 100 metres relay at the 1969 European Athletics Championships was held in Athens, Greece, at Georgios Karaiskakis Stadium on 19 and 20 September 1969.

== Medalists ==
Gold	Alain Sarteur; Patrick Bourbeillon; Gérard Fenouil; François Saint-Gilles; France
Silver	Aleksandr Lebedev; Vladislav Sapeya; Nikolay Ivanov; Valeriy Borzov; Soviet Union
Bronze	Ladislav Kříž; Dionýz Szögedi; Jiří Kynos; Luděk Bohman; Czechoslovakia

== Results ==
=== Final ===
20 September

Rank	Nation	Competitors	Time	Notes
1st place, gold medalist(s)	France	Alain Sarteur; Patrick Bourbeillon; Gérard Fenouil; François Saint-Gilles	38.89	CR
2nd place, silver medalist(s)	Soviet Union	Aleksandr Lebedev; Vladislav Sapeya; Nikolay Ivanov; Valeriy Borzov	39.40	
3rd place, bronze medalist(s)	Czechoslovakia	Ladislav Kříž; Dionýz Szögedi; Jiří Kynos; Luděk Bohman	39.52	NR
4	Poland	Stanisław Wagner; Edward Romanowski; Zenon Nowosz; Tadeusz Cuch	39.55	
5	East Germany	Günther Gollos; Peter Haase; Hermann Burde; Hans-Jürgen Bombach	39.67	
6	West Germany	Manfred Knickenberg; Gerhard Wucherer; Volker Stöckel; Günther Nickel	39.68	
7	Yugoslavia	Miro Kocuvan; Gabor Lenđel; Ivica Karasi; Predrag Križan	39.72	
8	Italy	Giorgio Rietti; Ennio Preatoni; Angelo Squazzero; Francesco Zandano	39.85	

=== Heats ===
19 September

==== Heat 1 ====
Rank	Nation	Competitors	Time	Notes
1	France	Alain Sarteur; Patrick Bourbeillon; Gérard Fenouil; François Saint-Gilles	39.3	CR Q
2	Czechoslovakia	Ladislav Kříž; Dionýz Szögedi; Jiří Kynos; Luděk Bohman	39.6	Q
3	Poland	Stanisław Wagner; Edward Romanowski; Zenon Nowosz; Tadeusz Cuch	39.6	Q
4	Italy	Giorgio Rietti; Ennio Preatoni; Angelo Squazzero; Francesco Zandano	39.8	Q
5	Greece	Vasilios Papageorgopoulos; Georgios Mikelidis; Antonios Mitrakis; Nikolaos Argiris	40.5	

==== Heat 2 ====
Rank	Nation	Competitors	Time	Notes
1	East Germany	Günther Gollos; Peter Haase; Hermann Burde; Hans-Jürgen Bombach	39.6	Q
2	Yugoslavia	Miro Kocuvan; Gabor Lendjel; Ivica Karasi; Predrag Križan	40.0	Q
3	West Germany	Manfred Knickenberg; Günther Nickel; Gerhard Wucherer; Volker Stöckel	40.0	Q
4	Soviet Union	Aleksandr Lebedev; Vladislav Sapeya; Nikolay Ivanov; Valeriy Borzov	40.1	Q
5	Great Britain	Ian Green; Ron Jones; Dave Dear; Don Halliday	40.2	

== Participation ==
According to an unofficial count, 40 athletes from 10 countries participated in the event.

- Czechoslovakia (4)
- East Germany (4)
- France (4)
- Greece (4)
- Italy (4)
- Poland (4)
- Soviet Union (4)
- Great Britain (4)
- West Germany (4)
- Yugoslavia (4)
