= Juraj Demeč =

Czechoslovak sprinter

Medal record

Men's athletics

Representing Czechoslovakia

European Championships
Gold medal – first place	1971 Helsinki	4×100 m

Juraj Demeč (born 29 January 1945 in Uzhhorod, Russian occupied Ruthenia, present-day Ukraine) is a Czechoslovak former track and field athlete who competed in the 100 metres. He represented Czechoslovakia at the 1972 Summer Olympics.

He was a three-time participant at the European Athletics Championships (1966, 1971, 1974) and was part of the gold medal-winning team in the 4 × 100 metres relay at the 1971 European Athletics Championships, running alongside Ladislav Kříž, Jiří Kynos, and Luděk Bohman. He was also a relay silver medallist at the 1966 European Indoor Games, an event that would become the European Athletics Indoor Championships.

He participated in the Olympic Games of 1972, being eliminated in series on 100 m. But in the 4 × 100 m relay, he finished 4th in the final and beat Czechoslovakia's record in 38 s 82 (record in force for the Czech Republic alone until 2019, the team, made up of Jaroslav Matoušek, Juraj Demeč, Jiří Kynos, Luděk Bohman). The previous year, he won the gold medal in the relay with 39 s 3 at the 1971 European Athletics Championships.
