= 1971 European Athletics Championships – Men's 4 × 100 metres relay =

Men's 4 × 100 metres relay at the European Athletics Championships

The men's 4 × 100 metres relay at the 1971 European Athletics Championships was held in Helsinki, Finland, at Helsinki Olympic Stadium on 14 and 15 August 1971.

== Medalists ==
Gold	Ladislav Kříž; Juraj Demeč; Jiří Kynos; Luděk Bohman; Czechoslovakia
Silver	Gerard Gramse; Tadeusz Cuch; Zenon Nowosz; Marian Dudziak; Poland
Bronze	Vincenzo Guerini; Pietro Mennea; Pasqualino Abeti; Ennio Preatoni; Italy

== Results ==
=== Final ===
15 August

Rank	Nation	Competitors	Time	Notes
1st place, gold medalist(s)	Czechoslovakia	Ladislav Kříž; Juraj Demeč; Jiří Kynos; Luděk Bohman	39.32	NR
2nd place, silver medalist(s)	Poland	Gerard Gramse; Tadeusz Cuch; Zenon Nowosz; Marian Dudziak	39.72	
3rd place, bronze medalist(s)	Italy	Vincenzo Guerini; Pietro Mennea; Pasqualino Abeti; Ennio Preatoni	39.78	
4	Great Britain	Brian Green; Martin Reynolds; Don Halliday; Les Piggot	39.78	
5	Soviet Union	Aleksandr Kornelyuk; Aleksandr Zhidkikh; Aleksandr Lebedev; Aleksey Chebykin	40.00	
	West Germany	Manfred Ommer; Karl-Heinz Klotz; Gerhard Wucherer; Franz-Peter Hofmeister	DNF	
	East Germany	Hans-Jürgen Bombach; Jörg Pfeifer; Hermann Burde; Hans-Joachim Zenk	DQ	
	France	Dominique Chauvelot; Patrick Bourbeillon; Gérard Fenouil; Jean-Pierre Grès	DQ	

=== Heats ===
14 August

==== Heat 1 ====
Rank	Nation	Competitors	Time	Notes
1	West Germany	Manfred Ommer; Karl-Heinz Klotz; Gerhard Wucherer; Franz-Peter Hofmeister	39.55	Q
2	Great Britain	Brian Green; Martin Reynolds; Don Halliday; Les Piggot	39.77	Q
3	Poland	Gerard Gramse; Tadeusz Cuch; Zenon Nowosz; Marian Dudziak	39.83	Q
4	Italy	Vincenzo Guerini; Pietro Mennea; Pasqualino Abeti; Ennio Preatoni	39.95	Q
5	Sweden	Curt Johansson; Thorsten Johansson; Bo Söderberg; Anders Faager	40.67	

==== Heat 2 ====
Rank	Nation	Competitors	Time	Notes
1	France	Dominique Chauvelot; Patrick Bourbeillon; Gérard Fenouil; Jean-Pierre Grès	39.40	Q
2	East Germany	Hans-Jürgen Bombach; Jörg Pfeifer; Hermann Burde; Hans-Joachim Zenk	39.42	Q
3	Czechoslovakia	Ladislav Kříž; Juraj Demeč; Jiří Kynos; Luděk Bohman	39.77	Q
4	Soviet Union	Aleksandr Kornelyuk; Aleksandr Zhidkikh; Aleksandr Lebedev; Aleksey Chebykin	39.78	Q
	Yugoslavia	Hrvoje Vincijanovic; Ivica Karasi; Miro Kocuvan; Predrag Križan	DNF	

== Participation ==
According to an unofficial count, 40 athletes from 10 countries participated in the event.

- Czechoslovakia (4)
- East Germany (4)
- France (4)
- Italy (4)
- Poland (4)
- Soviet Union (4)
- Sweden (4)
- Great Britain (4)
- West Germany (4)
- Yugoslavia (4)
