= Tadeusz Cuch =

Polish sprinter (born 1945)

Medal record

Men's athletics

Representing Poland

European Championships
Silver medal – second place	1971 Helsinki	4x100 m

Tadeusz Cuch (Polish pronunciation: [ˈta.dɛwʂ 't͡sux]) (born 17 February 1945) was a Polish sprinter who specialized in the 100 metres.

He was born in Stary Bazanów and represented the club Legia Warszawa. At the inaugural 1964 European Junior Championships he won the bronze medal in the 100 metres, as well as a gold medal in the 4 x 100 metres relay and a silver medal in the medley relay where he ran the opening leg.

At the 1971 European Championships he won a silver medal in the 4 x 100 metres relay together with Marian Dudziak, Gerard Gramse and Zenon Nowosz. At the 1972 Olympic Games he competed in the 100 metres without progressing from round one. He also finished sixth in the 4 x 100 metres relay final, together with Stanisław Wagner, Jerzy Czerbniak and Zenon Nowosz.

His personal best time was 10.49 seconds, achieved in 1973.

== International competitions ==
Year	Competition	Venue	Position	Event	Notes
Representing Poland
1964	European Junior Games	Warsaw, Poland	3rd	100 m	10.8
1964	European Junior Games	Warsaw, Poland	1st	4 × 100 m relay	41.6
1964	European Junior Games	Warsaw, Poland	2nd	Sprint medley relay	1:55.9
1969	European Championships	Athens, Greece	17th (h)	100 m	10.9
1969	European Championships	Athens, Greece	4th	4 × 100 m relay	39.55
1970	European Cup Final	Stockholm, Sweden	2nd	4 × 100 m relay	39.5
1971	European Championships	Helsinki, Finland	13th (h)	100 m	10.75
1971	European Championships	Helsinki, Finland	2nd	4 × 100 m relay	39.72
1972	Olympic Games	Munich, West Germany	62nd (h)	100 m	10.89
1972	Olympic Games	Munich, West Germany	6th	4 × 100 m relay	39.03

== Personal bests ==
Outdoor

- 100 metres – 10.49 (10.49 1973)
- 200 metres – 21.1h (Warsaw 1970)

Indoor

- 60 metres – 6.67 (Zabrze 1973)
