= Gerard Gramse =

Polish sprinter

Personal information
- Born: 18 August 1944 Mrocza, Poland
- Died: 8 November 2012 (aged 68) Poznań, Poland

Sport
- Sport: Track and field
- Club: AZS Poznań
Medal record
Representing Poland
European Championships
Silver medal – second place	1971 Helsinki	4x100m relay
Summer Universiade
Gold medal – first place	1970 Turin	4x100m relay

Gerard Gramse (18 August 1944 – 8 November 2012) was a Polish sprinter who specialized in the 100 and 200 metres.

He was born in Mrocza and represented the club AZS Poznań. At the 1971 European Championships he won a silver medal in the 4 x 100 metres relay together with Marian Dudziak, Tadeusz Cuch and Zenon Nowosz. He also won a gold medal in the same event at the 1970 Summer Universiade, together with Stanisław Wagner, Jan Werner and Zenon Nowosz.

His personal best times were 10.3 seconds in the 100 metres and 21.0 seconds in the 200 metres.

== International competitions ==
Year	Competition	Venue	Position	Event	Notes
Representing Poland
1965	Universiade	Budapest, Hungary	5th	4 × 100 m relay	41.0
1970	Universiade	Turin, Italy	1st	4 × 100 m relay	39.2
1971	European Championships	Helsinki, Finland	2nd	4 × 100 m relay	39.72
