= 1964 European Junior Games =

- Level: Under 20
- Events: 29

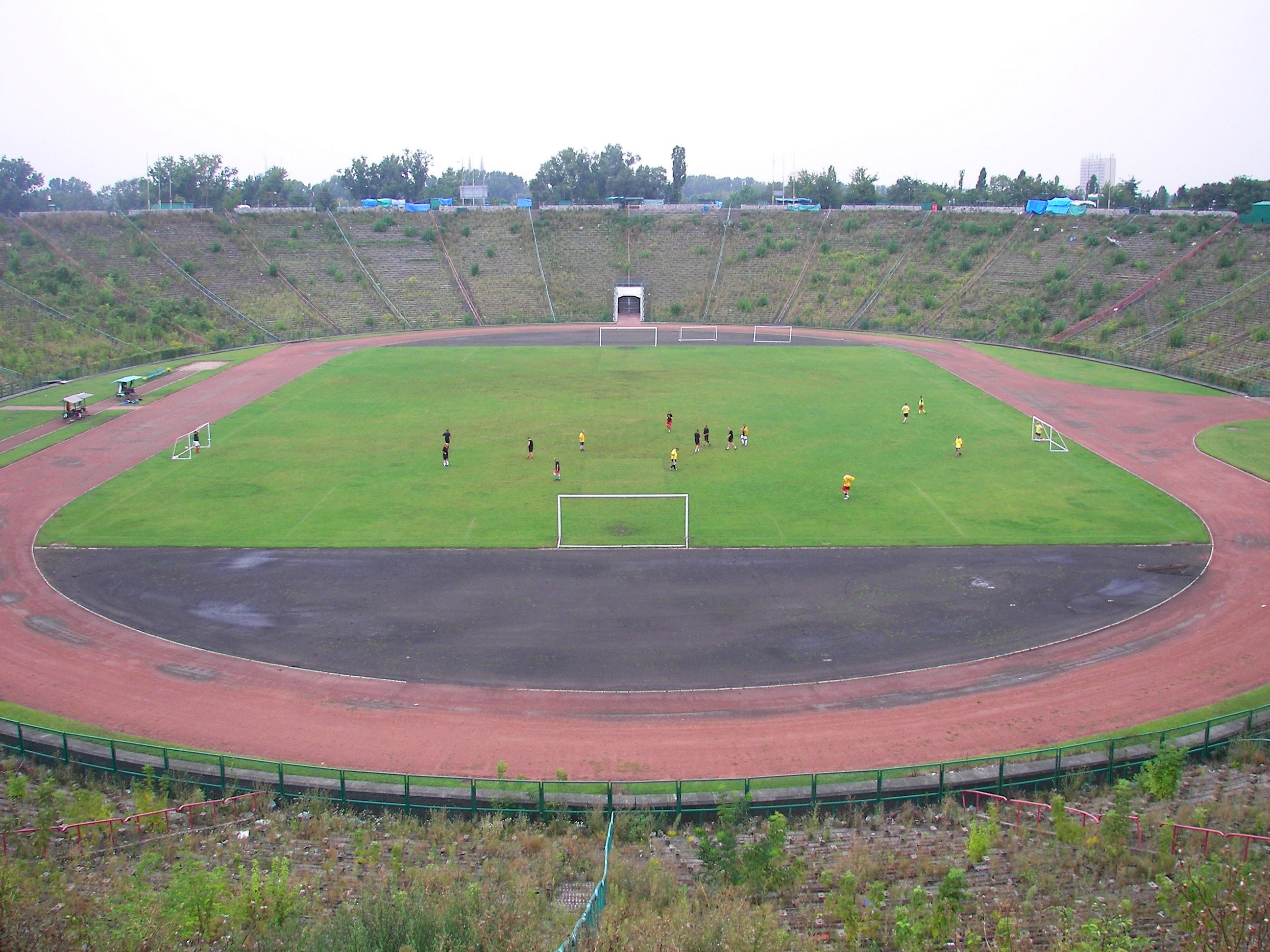
The host stadium in Warsaw

The 1964 European Junior Games was the first edition of what would become the biennial athletics competition for European athletes aged under twenty. It was an unofficial competition without sanction from the European Athletic Association. The event was held at the 10th-Anniversary Stadium in Warsaw, Poland, between 18 and 20 September. The success of the competition eventually led to the creation of the official European Athletics Junior Championships in 1970.

== Medal summary ==
=== Men ===
Event	Gold		Silver		Bronze	
100 m	Zhivko Traykov (BUL)	10.6	Aleksandr Lebedev (URS)	10.8	Tadeusz Cuch (POL)	10.8
200 m	Gérard Fenouil (FRA)	21.6	Tadeusz Jaworski (POL)	21.9	István Batori (HUN)	21.9
400 m	Ingo Röper (FRG)	48.9	Stanisław Grędziński (POL)	48.9	Nikolay Shkarnikov (URS)	49.0
800 m	Franz-Josef Kemper (FRG)	1:51.9	Oleg Rayko (URS)	1:53.2	Jean-Pierre Dufresne (FRA)	1:55.1
1500 m	Jürgen Haase (GDR)	3:52.4	Oleg Rayko (URS)	3:52.7	Ulf Högberg (SWE)	3:53.6
3000 m	Jürgen Haase (GDR)	8:25.4	Jörg Blümer (GDR)	8:31.6	Ivan Pavličević (YUG)	8:32.2
110 metres hurdles	Boris Pishchulin (URS)	14.5	Włodzimierz Martinek (POL)	15.0	Jean-Pierre Morelatto (FRA)	15.0
400 metres hurdles	Włodzimierz Martinek (POL)	51.9	Stanisław Grędziński (POL)	52.3	Werner Schiedewitz (GDR)	53.8
1500 m steeplechase	Anders Gärderud (SWE)	4:08.0	Francesco Valenti (ITA)	4:13.1	Constantin Perju (ROM)	4:13.2
4 × 100 m relay	Poland (POL); Bogusław Pelc; Tadeusz Jaworski; Wojciech Kinowski; Tadeusz Cuch	41.6	Soviet Union (URS); Aleksandr Lebedev; Valeriy Ryabenko; Zauri Sarkysyan; Vladimir Kosyak	41.8	East Germany (GDR); Dieter Bartholomey; Bernd Hering; Heiner Malo; Werner Wishöth	42.1
Sprint medley relay	Soviet Union (URS); Valeriy Ryabenko; Vladimir Kosyak; Zauri Sarkysyan; Nikolay Shkarnikov	1:55.8	Poland (POL); Tadeusz Cuch; Tadeusz Jaworski; Włodzimierz Martinek; Stanisław Grędziński	1:55.9	Hungary (HUN); István Batori; László Bodor; Péter Petrovics; László Horváth	1:56.1
High jump	Igor Matveyev (URS)	2.04	Bo Jonsson (SWE)	2.01	Vitaliy Paltsatov (URS)	1.98
Pole vault	John-Erik Blomqvist (SWE)	4.40	Eugeniusz Miklas (POL)	4.35	Valeriy Talalay (URS)	4.30
Long jump	Jan Kobuszewski (POL)	7.48	Viktor Saneyev (URS)	7.42	Wojciech Chwaluczyk (POL)	7.18
Triple jump	Aleksey Borzenko (URS)	15.72	Viktor Saneyev (URS)	15.71	Siegfried Dähne (GDR)	15.37
Shot put	Géza Fejér (HUN)	17.05	Jarosław Grabowski (POL)	15.95	Adriano Buffon (ITA)	15.66
Discus throw	Géza Fejér (HUN)	51.50	Jarosław Grabowski (POL)	50.84	Iosif Naghi (ROM)	50.54
Hammer throw	Gheorghe Costache (ROM)	62.12	Virgil Ţibulschi (ROM)	56.46	Martin Šebesta (TCH)	56.19
Javelin throw (old model)	Witold Krupiński (POL)	74.59	Valeriy Popkov (URS)	69.09	Åke Nilsson (SWE)	68.50

=== Women ===
Event	Gold		Silver		Bronze	
100 m	Ewa Kłobukowska (POL)	11.6	Galina Bukharina (URS)	12.0	Angela Höhme (GDR)	12.0
200 m	Irena Kirszenstein (POL)	23.5	Natalya Burda (URS)	24.4	Angela Höhme (GDR)	24.8
600 m	Gunilla Olausson (SWE)	1:32.3	Leontina Frunza (ROM)	1:32.6	Inge Ebert (GDR)	1:32.6
80 m hurdles	Elżbieta Bednarek (POL)	11.2	Galina Kostinyuk (URS)	11.3	Gerda Mittenzwei (GDR)	11.3
4 × 100 m relay	Poland (POL); Jadwiga Dudek; Irena Woldańska; Elżbieta Bednarek; Irena Kirszenstein	46.6	Soviet Union (URS); Natalya Burda; Lyudmila Gaponova; Galina Bukharina; Natalya Runova	46.8	East Germany (GDR); Roswitha Handwerk; Angela Höhme; Gerda Mittenzwei; Irmgard Schneider	47.6
High jump	Rita Gildemeister (GDR)	1.67	Jaroslava Králová (TCH)	1.64	Dagmar Melzer (GDR)	1.61
Long jump	Irena Kirszenstein (POL)	6.19	Dorothee Sander (FRG)	5.83	Maria Zafirova (BUL)	5.78
Shot put	Nadezhda Chizhova (URS)	16.60	Galina Nyagolova (BUL)	13.17	Ani Rudova (BUL)	12.23
Discus throw	Nadezhda Chizhova (URS)	45.86	Gabriele Trepschek (GDR)	45.71	Wanda Harasimiuk (POL)	45.31
Javelin throw (old model)	Mihaela Peneș (ROM)	54.54	Valentina Popova (URS)	52.33	Helgard Richter (GDR)	50.27

== Medal table ==
* Host nation (Poland)

Rank	Nation	Gold	Silver	Bronze	Total
1	Poland (POL)*	9	8	3	20
2	Soviet Union (URS)	6	12	3	21
3	East Germany (GDR)	3	2	10	15
4	Sweden (SWE)	3	1	2	6
5	Romania (ROU)	2	2	2	6
6	West Germany (FRG)	2	1	0	3
7	Hungary (HUN)	2	0	2	4
8	Bulgaria (BUL)	1	1	2	4
9	France (FRA)	1	0	2	3
10	Czechoslovakia (TCH)	0	1	1	2
10	Italy (ITA)	0	1	1	2
12	Yugoslavia (YUG)	0	0	1	1
Totals (12 entries)		29	29	29	87
