= Athletics at the 1970 Summer Universiade – Women's 100 metres hurdles =

The women's 100 metres hurdles event at the 1970 Summer Universiade was held at the Stadio Comunale in Turin on 2 and 3 September 1970. It was the first time that this hurdling distance was contested replacing the 80 metres hurdles.

== Medalists ==
Gold	Silver	Bronze
Teresa Sukniewicz; Poland	Bärbel Podeswa; East Germany	Valeria Bufanu; Romania

== Results ==
=== Heats ===
Wind:
Heat 1: +1.3 m/s, Heat 2: +1.4 m/s, Heat 3: +1.5 m/s

Rank	Heat	Athlete	Nationality	Time	Notes
1	1	Teresa Sukniewicz	Poland	13.1	Q
2	1	Valeria Bufanu	Romania	13.7	Q
3	1	Patrice Donnelly	United States	14.0	
4	1	Martine Laval	France	14.2	
5	1	Ivanka Koshnicharska	Bulgaria	14.2	
6	1	Gloria Iweka	Nigeria	15.4	
1	2	Mieke Sterk	Netherlands	13.6	Q
2	2	Jacqueline André	France	13.8	Q
3	2	Tatyana Antaryan	Soviet Union	13.8	
4	2	Lourdes Jones	Cuba	14.0	
5	2	Dimitrina Koleva	Bulgaria	14.2	
6	2	Cheryl Rogers	United States	14.6	
1	3	Danuta Straszyńska	Poland	13.4	Q
2	3	Bärbel Podeswa	East Germany	13.6	Q
3	3	Heidi Schüller	West Germany	13.7	q
4	3	Sheila Garnett	Great Britain	13.8	q
5	3	Henriette Vooys	Netherlands	14.1	
6	3	Penny May	Canada	14.3	
7	3	Mária Kiss	Hungary	14.6	
8	3	Manjit Kaur Walia	India	14.9	

=== Final ===
Rank	Name	Nationality	Time	Notes
1st place, gold medalist(s)	Teresa Sukniewicz	Poland	13.0	UR
2nd place, silver medalist(s)	Bärbel Podeswa	East Germany	13.4	
3rd place, bronze medalist(s)	Valeria Bufanu	Romania	13.5	
4	Danuta Straszyńska	Poland	13.6	
5	Heidi Schüller	West Germany	13.7	
6	Sheila Garnett	Great Britain	13.9	
7	Jacqueline André	France	14.1	
	Mieke Sterk	Netherlands	DNS	
