= Porfirio Veras =

Dominican Republic sprinter

Personal information
- Full name: Porfirio Veras Mercedes
- Nationality: Dominican
- Born: 15 July 1943 (age 82) Concepción de la Vega, Dominican Republic
- Height: 1.65 m (5 ft 5 in)
- Weight: 77 kg (170 lb)

Sport
- Sport: Sprinting
- Event: 100 metres
Medal record
Representing Dominican Republic
Central American and Caribbean Games
Silver medal – second place	1974 Santo Domingo	4x100m relay

Porfirio Veras Mercedes (born 15 July 1943) is a Dominican Republic former track and field athlete, baseball player, and sports administrator. He represented the Dominican Republic in the 100-meter and 200-meter dashes at several international competitions, including the 1968 Summer Olympics and multiple Central American and Caribbean Games. Veras set a national milestone during the 1968 Olympics when he completed the 100-meter event in 10.5 seconds. He officially retired from competitive track and field in 1974.

In addition to his career as a sprinter, Veras was a multi-sport athlete who played for the Dominican Republic national baseball team. Following his retirement from athletics and graduating with a law degree, he transitioned into sports governance. In 2004, he was appointed as the National Commissioner of Baseball for the Dominican Republic.

== Early life and education ==
He was born on 15 July 1943 in Los Pomos, La Vega and completed his primary and secondary education at the Federico García Godoy School in La Vega. Then he attended Pontificia Universidad Católica Madre y Maestra in Santiago, where he graduated with a law degree.

== Career ==
=== Athletics ===
Veras began his career in track and field at 23 and excelled in short-distance running, making his international debut at the 1966 Central American and Caribbean Games in Puerto Rico and taking second place in the 100-meter dash at a regional competition in Ponce.

In 1968, Veras competed in the II National Sports Games, where he won gold medals in both the 100-meter and 200-meter dashes, defeating Alberto Torres , the current champion of that event. In the same year, he competed at the 1968 Summer Olympics in Mexico. During the games, he finished fifth in the 100-meters heats with a time of 10.51 seconds and running 21.53 in the 200 meters heats, not qualifying. Veras traveled to Panama in 1970 for the XI Central American and Caribbean Games, where he finished fourth in the 100-meter event. In 1971, he suffered a fractured right ankle, which hindered his sprinting. Despite the injury, he participated in the 1974 Central American and Caribbean Games, where he won a silver medal in the 4 x 100-meter relay and ran the 100-meter dash in 10.6 seconds. By 1974, Veras had officially retired from competitive athletics.

=== Later career ===
Veras was also a member of the Dominican Republic national baseball team and was appointed the country's baseball commissioner in 2004.

== International competitions ==
Year	Competition	Venue	Position	Event	Notes
Representing the Dominican Republic
1966	Central American and Caribbean Games	San Juan, Puerto Rico	12th (h)	100 m	10.7
1966	Central American and Caribbean Games	San Juan, Puerto Rico	18th (h)	200 m	22.7
1966	Central American and Caribbean Games	San Juan, Puerto Rico	5th	4 × 100 m relay	41.0
1968	Olympic Games	Mexico City, Mexico	32nd (h)	100 m	10.51
1968	Olympic Games	Mexico City, Mexico	38th (h)	200 m	21.53
1968	Olympic Games	Mexico City, Mexico	18th (h)	4 × 100 m relay	41.4
1970	Central American and Caribbean Games	Panama City, Panama	6th	4 × 100 m relay	41.7
1970	Universiade	Turin, Italy	8th (h)	100 m	10.5
1970	Universiade	Turin, Italy	13th (sf)	200 m	21.7
1974	Central American and Caribbean Games	Santo Domingo, Dominican Republic	4th	100 m	10.78
1974	Central American and Caribbean Games	Santo Domingo, Dominican Republic	2nd	4 × 100 m relay	40.35

== Personal bests ==
- 100 metres – 10.51 (1968)
- 200 metres – 21.53 (1968)
