= Colglazier =

Colglazier is a surname. Notable people with the surname include:

- Michael Colglazier (born 1967), American executive at Disney and Virgin Galactic
- Robert Wesley Colglazier Jr. (1904–1993), United States Army General
- Roger Colglazier (born 1950), American sprinter
- William Colglazier (born 1944), American physicist
