= Athletics at the 1968 Summer Olympics – Men's 100 metres =

Men's 100 metres at the Games of the XIX Olympiad
- Venue: Estadio Olímpico Universitario; Mexico City, Mexico
- Dates: October 13, 1968 (heats, quarterfinals); October 14, 1968 (semifinals, final)
- Competitors: 65 from 42 nations
- Winning time: 9.95 seconds

Medalists
1st place, gold medalist(s)		Jim Hines; United States
2nd place, silver medalist(s)		Lennox Miller; Jamaica
3rd place, bronze medalist(s)		Charles Greene; United States

Official Video Highlights

The men's 100 metres sprint event at the 1968 Olympic Games took place at Estadio Olímpico Universitario in Mexico City, Mexico, on October 13 and 14. Sixty-five athletes from 42 nations took part. Each nation was limited to 3 runners by rules in place since the 1930 Olympic Congress. The final was won by American Jim Hines, the second consecutive time the event was won by an American (and the nation's 12th title in the event overall). Jamaica won its first medal in the event since 1952.

== Background ==
This was the sixteenth time the event was held, having appeared at every Olympics since the first in 1896. The gold medalist from 1964, American Bob Hayes, did not return (playing in the National Football League instead), but Tokyo silver medalist Cuban Enrique Figuerola and bronze medalist Canadian Harry Jerome did. The American team was led by Jim Hines and Charles Greene, two of the three men to establish the world record at 9.9 seconds during the Night of Speed; Mel Pender, a 1964 finalist, was the third member of the team. Jamaican Lennox Miller was the strongest challenger to the Americans.

El Salvador, Nicaragua, Puerto Rico, Suriname, and Tanzania were represented in the event for the first time. East and West Germany also competed separately for the first time. The United States was the only nation to have appeared at each of the first sixteen Olympic men's 100 metres events.

== Competition format ==
The event retained the same basic four round format from 1920–1964: heats, quarterfinals, semifinals, and a final. A significant change, however, was the introduction of the "fastest loser" system. Previously, advancement depended solely on the runners' place in their heat. The 1968 competition added advancement places to the fastest runners across the heats in the first round who did not advance based on place.

The first round consisted of nine heats, most with 7–8 athletes but the first having only 5. The top three runners in each heat advanced, along with the next five fastest runners overall. This made 32 quarterfinalists, who were divided into four heats of 8 runners. The top four runners in each quarterfinal advanced (with no "fastest loser" provision in rounds after the first). The 16 semifinalists competed in two heats of 8, with the top four in each semifinal advancing to the eight-man final.

== Records ==
Prior to the competition, the existing World and Olympic records were as follows.

World record	9.9	(United States) Jim Hines	Sacramento, United States	20 June 1968
World record	9.9	(United States) Ronnie Ray Smith	Sacramento, United States	20 June 1968
World record	9.9	(United States) Charles Greene	Sacramento, United States	20 June 1968
Olympic record	10.0	(United States) Bob Hayes	Tokyo, Japan	15 October 1964

Jim Hines had a time of 9.9 seconds (hand-timed) or 9.95 seconds (auto-timed) in the final. This equalled the world record and set a new Olympic record, which were measured by hand-timing at that point. The 9.95 second time was recognized as the initial world record for electronic timed results when the IAAF changed its records rules in 1977.

== Results ==
=== Heats ===
The top three runners in each of the nine heats, and the next fastest five, advanced to the quarterfinal round.

==== Heat 1 ====
Wind: +2.8 m/s . The strong tailwind made this heat ineligible for records.

Rank	Athlete	Nation	Time	Notes
1	Charles Greene	United States	10.09	Q
2	Hideo Iijima	Japan	10.24	Q
3	Canagasabai Kunalan	Singapore	10.47	Q
4	Wiesław Maniak	Poland	10.49	
5	Barka Sy	Senegal	10.61	

==== Heat 2 ====
Wind: +0.8 m/s

Rank	Athlete	Nation	Time	Notes
1	Jim Hines	United States	10.26	Q
2	Jean-Louis Ravelomanantsoa	Madagascar	10.30	Q
3	Gaoussou Koné	Ivory Coast	10.37	Q
4	Amos Omolo	Uganda	10.50	q
5	Porfirio Veras	Dominican Republic	10.51	
6	Julius Sang	Kenya	10.64	
7	Jorge Vizcarrondo	Puerto Rico	10.71	
8	Manuel Planchart	Venezuela	10.80	

==== Heat 3 ====
Wind: 0.0 m/s

Rank	Athlete	Nation	Time	Notes
1	Enrique Figuerola	Cuba	10.40	Q
2	Iván Moreno	Chile	10.53	Q
3	Barrie Kelly	Great Britain	10.55	Q
4	Yevgeny Sinyayev	Soviet Union	10.56	
5	Zenon Nowosz	Poland	10.57	
6	Charles Asati	Kenya	10.63	
7	Jimmy Sierra	Colombia	10.88	

==== Heat 4 ====
Wind: +0.6 m/s

Rank	Athlete	Nation	Time	Notes
1	Pablo Montes	Cuba	10.14	Q
2	Mel Pender	United States	10.35	Q
3	Ron Jones	Great Britain	10.45	Q
4	Oleksiy Khlopotnov	Soviet Union	10.49	
5	Norris Stubbs	Bahamas	10.67	
6	Chen Chuan-show	Taiwan	10.91	
7	Philippe Housiaux	Belgium	10.94	

==== Heat 5 ====
Wind: +0.7 m/s

Rank	Athlete	Nation	Time	Notes
1	Roger Bambuck	France	10.18	Q
2	Heinz Erbstößer	East Germany	10.42	Q
3	Michael Ahey	Ghana	10.59	Q
4	Bernard Nottage	Bahamas	10.64	
5	Ennio Preatoni	Italy	10.65	
6	Hansruedi Wiedmer	Switzerland	10.75	
7	Su Wen-ho	Taiwan	10.81	

==== Heat 6 ====
Wind: +3.8 m/s. The strong tailwind made this heat ineligible for records.

Rank	Athlete	Nation	Time	Notes
1	Lennox Miller	Jamaica	10.15	Q
2	Hartmut Schelter	East Germany	10.34	Q
3	Manikavasagam Jegathesan	Malaysia	10.35	Q
4	Robert Ojo	Nigeria	10.47	q
5	Ron Monsegue	Trinidad and Tobago	10.56	
6	Rogelio Onofre	Philippines	10.58	
-	Tom Robinson	Bahamas	DNF	

==== Heat 7 ====
Wind: +0.4 m/s

Rank	Athlete	Nation	Time	Notes
1	Harry Jerome	Canada	10.35	Q
2	Karl-Peter Schmidtke	West Germany	10.38	Q
3	Harald Eggers	East Germany	10.38	Q
4	Kola Abdulai	Nigeria	10.45	q
5	Miguel Angel González	Mexico	10.59	
6	Pablo McNeil	Jamaica	10.62	
7	Hassan El-Mech	Morocco	10.79	
8	Morgan Gesmalla	Sudan	11.09	

==== Heat 8 ====
Wind: 0.0 m/s

Rank	Athlete	Nation	Time	Notes
1	Gérard Fenouil	France	10.42	Q
2	Gerhard Wucherer	West Germany	10.42	Q
3	Marian Dudziak	Poland	10.46	Q
4	Vladislav Sapeya	Soviet Union	10.46	q
5	Eddy Monsels	Suriname	10.48	q
6	Greg Lewis	Australia	10.55	
7	Félix Bécquer	Mexico	10.72	
8	Rafael Santos	El Salvador	11.22	

==== Heat 9 ====
Wind: 0.0 m/s

Rank	Athlete	Nation	Time	Notes
1	Hermes Ramírez	Cuba	10.30	Q
2	Andrés Calonge	Argentina	10.44	Q
3	Jocelyn Delecour	France	10.45	Q
4	Gert Metz	West Germany	10.55	
5	Norman Chihota	Tanzania	10.57	
6	Horacio Esteves	Venezuela	10.65	
7	José Luis Sánchez Paraíso	Spain	10.69	
8	Juan Argüello	Nicaragua	11.18	

=== Quarterfinals ===
The top four runners in each of the four heats advanced to the semifinal round.

==== Quarterfinal 1 ====
Wind: +1.8 m/s

Rank	Athlete	Nation	Time	Notes
1	Lennox Miller	Jamaica	10.11	Q
2	Jim Hines	United States	10.14	Q
3	Enrique Figuerola	Cuba	10.23	Q
4	Iván Moreno	Chile	10.37	Q
5	Andrés Calonge	Argentina	10.39	
6	Ron Jones	Great Britain	10.42	
7	Karl-Peter Schmidtke	West Germany	10.48	
8	Vladislav Sapeya	Soviet Union	10.51	

==== Quarterfinal 2 ====
Wind: +0.5 m/s

Rank	Athlete	Nation	Time	Notes
1	Hermes Ramírez	Cuba	10.10	Q
2	Mel Pender	United States	10.16	Q
3	Roger Bambuck	France	10.17	Q
4	Harry Jerome	Canada	10.22	Q
5	Heinz Erbstößer	East Germany	10.28	
6	Gerhard Wucherer	West Germany	10.33	
7	Kola Abdulai	Nigeria	10.38	
8	Michael Ahey	Ghana	10.49	

==== Quarterfinal 3 ====
Wind: +4.2 m/s. The strong tailwind made this heat ineligible for records.

Rank	Athlete	Nation	Time	Notes
1	Pablo Montes	Cuba	10.16	Q
2	Hartmut Schelter	East Germany	10.29	Q
3	Hideo Iijima	Japan	10.31	Q
4	Gérard Fenouil	France	10.31	Q
5	Marian Dudziak	Poland	10.32	
6	Manikavasagam Jegathesan	Malaysia	10.38	
7	Amos Omolo	Uganda	10.45	
8	Robert Ojo	Nigeria	10.45	

==== Quarterfinal 4 ====
Wind: +2.0 m/s

Rank	Athlete	Nation	Time	Notes
1	Charlie Greene	United States	10.02	Q
2	Jean-Louis Ravelomanantsoa	Madagascar	10.18	Q, NR
3	Gaoussou Koné	Ivory Coast	10.22	Q
4	Harald Eggers	East Germany	10.25	Q
5	Barrie Kelly	Great Britain	10.35	
6	Jocelyn Delecour	France	10.36	
7	Canagasabai Kunalan	Singapore	10.38	
8	Eddy Monsels	Suriname	10.45	

=== Semifinals ===
The top four runners in each of the two heats advanced to the final round.

==== Semifinal 1 ====
Wind: +1.6 m/s

Rank	Athlete	Nation	Time	Notes
1	Jim Hines	United States	10.08	Q
2	Roger Bambuck	France	10.11	Q
3	Harry Jerome	Canada	10.17	Q
4	Mel Pender	United States	10.21	Q
5	Enrique Figuerola	Cuba	10.23	
6	Hermes Ramírez	Cuba	10.25	
7	Harald Eggers	East Germany	10.29	
8	Hideo Iijima	Japan	10.34	

==== Semifinal 2 ====
Wind: 0.0 m/s

Rank	Athlete	Nation	Time	Notes
1	Charlie Greene	United States	10.13	Q
2	Lennox Miller	Jamaica	10.15	Q
3	Pablo Montes	Cuba	10.19	Q
4	Jean-Louis Ravelomanantsoa	Madagascar	10.26	Q
5	Gaoussou Koné	Ivory Coast	10.27	
6	Iván Moreno	Chile	10.37	
7	Gérard Fenouil	France	10.40	
8	Hartmut Schelter	East Germany	10.40	

=== Final ===
Mel Pender and Charlie Greene were known for their fast starts. In the final, while Greene reacted to the gun noticeably slower, Pender did not disappoint, taking a quick lead. Greene, Lennox Miller and Jim Hines were the next chase group, the three outer lanes already left behind. The diminutive Pender's lead disappeared, the much larger Miller leading the group in passing by the halfway point. Hines was just getting into gear, exploding past Miller and putting a gap on the field to take the race by two metres. Miller leaned but he already had a metre on Green who was a metre ahead of Pablo Montes, Roger Bambuck and Pender to take the bronze.

Wind: +0.3 m/s (0.67 mph)

Rank	Lane	Athlete	Nation	Time (h)	Time (a)	Notes
1st place, gold medalist(s)	3	Jim Hines	United States	9.9	9.95	=WR (h), WR (a)
2nd place, silver medalist(s)	4	Lennox Miller	Jamaica	10.0	10.04	
3rd place, bronze medalist(s)	1	Charlie Greene	United States	10.0	10.07	
4	2	Pablo Montes	Cuba	10.1	10.14	
5	6	Roger Bambuck	France	10.1	10.14	
6	5	Mel Pender	United States	10.1	10.17	
7	7	Harry Jerome	Canada	10.2	10.20	
8	8	Jean-Louis Ravelomanantsoa	Madagascar	10.2	10.28	Photo-finish shows 10.275
