= 1971 European Athletics Championships =

10th European Athletics Championships
- The logo of the 1971 European Athletics Championships
- Dates: 10 – 15 August
- Host city: Helsinki, Finland
- Venue: Helsinki Olympic Stadium
- Level: Senior
- Type: Outdoor
- Events: 38
- Participation: 857 athletes from 29 nations

The 10th (X) European Athletics Championships were held from 10 August to 15 August 1971 in the Olympic Stadium of Helsinki, the capital of Finland. Contemporaneous reports on the event were given in the Glasgow Herald.

== Men's results ==
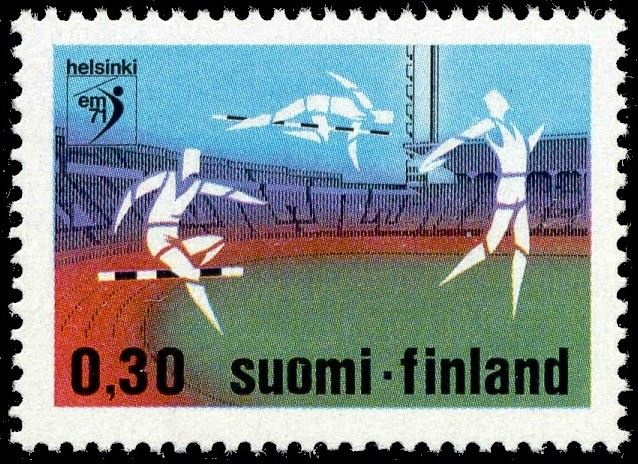
Finnish Postage stamp

Complete results were published.

=== Track ===
1966 |1969 |1971 |1974 |1978

| Event | Gold | | Silver | | Bronze | |
|---|---|---|---|---|---|---|
| 100 metres | Valeriy Borzov; Soviet Union | 10.26 CR | Gerhard Wucherer; West Germany | 10.48 | Vasilis Papageorgopoulos; Greece | 10.56 |
| 200 metres | Valeriy Borzov; Soviet Union | 20.30 CR | Franz-Peter Hofmeister; West Germany | 20.71 | Jörg Pfeifer; East Germany | 20.72 |
| 400 metres | David Jenkins; Great Britain | 45.45 CR | Marcello Fiasconaro; Italy | 45.49 | Jan Werner; Poland | 45.56 |
| 800 metres | Yevhen Arzhanov; Soviet Union | 1:45.62 CR | Dieter Fromm; East Germany | 1:45.96 | Andy Carter; Great Britain | 1:46.16 |
| 1500 metres | Francesco Arese; Italy | 3:38.43 CR | Henryk Szordykowski; Poland | 3:38.73 | Brendan Foster; Great Britain | 3:39.24 |
| 5000 metres | Juha Väätäinen; Finland | 13:32.48 CR | Jean Wadoux; France | 13:33.56 | Harald Norpoth; West Germany | 13:33.79 |
| 10,000 metres | Juha Väätäinen; Finland | 27:52.78 CR | Jürgen Haase; East Germany | 27:53.35 | Rashid Sharafetdinov; Soviet Union | 27:56.26 |
| Marathon | Karel Lismont; Belgium | 2:13:09 CR | Trevor Wright; Great Britain | 2:13:59 | Ron Hill; Great Britain | 2:14:34 |
| 20 kilometres walk | Nikolay Smaga; Soviet Union | 1:27:20 CR | Gerhard Sperling; East Germany | 1:27:29 | Paul Nihill; Great Britain | 1:27:34 |
| 50 kilometres walk | Veniamin Soldatenko; Soviet Union | 4:02:22 CR | Christoph Höhne; East Germany | 4:04:45 | Peter Selzer; East Germany | 4:06:11 |
| 110 metres hurdles | Frank Siebeck; East Germany | 14.00 | Alan Pascoe; Great Britain | 14.09 | Lubomír Nádeníček; Czechoslovakia | 14.30 |
| 400 metres hurdles | Jean-Claude Nallet; France | 49.15 =CR | Christian Rudolph; East Germany | 49.34 | Dmitriy Stukalov; Soviet Union | 50.04 |
| 3000 metres steeplechase | Jean-Paul Villain; France | 8:25.12 | Dušan Moravčík; Czechoslovakia | 8:26.11 | Pavel Sysoyev; Soviet Union | 8:26.42 |
| 4 × 100 metres relay | Ladislav Kříž; Juraj Demeč; Jiří Kynos; Luděk Bohman; Czechoslovakia (TCH) | 39.32 | Gerard Gramse; Tadeusz Cuch; Zenon Nowosz; Marian Dudziak; Poland (POL) | 39.72 | Vincenzo Guerini; Pietro Mennea; Pasqualino Abeti; Ennio Preatoni; Italy (ITA) | 39.78 |
| 4 × 400 metres relay | Horst-Rüdiger Schlöske; Thomas Jordan; Martin Jellinghaus; Hermann Köhler; West Germany (FRG) | 3:02.94 | Andrzej Badeński; Jan Balachowski; Waldemar Korycki; Jan Werner; Poland (POL) | 3:03.64 | Lorenzo Cellerino; Giacomo Puosi; Sergio Bello; Marcello Fiasconaro; Italy (ITA) | 3:04.58 |

=== Field ===
1966 |1969 |1971 |1974 |1978

| Event | Gold | | Silver | | Bronze | |
|---|---|---|---|---|---|---|
| High jump | Kęstutis Šapka; Soviet Union | 2.20 m | Csaba Dosa; Romania | 2.20 m | Rustam Akhmetov; Soviet Union | 2.20 m |
| Pole vault | Wolfgang Nordwig; East Germany | 5.35 m CR | Kjell Isaksson; Sweden | 5.30 m | Renato Dionisi; Italy | 5.30 m |
| Long jump | Max Klauß; East Germany | 7.92 m | Igor Ter-Ovanesyan; Soviet Union | 7.91 m | Stanisław Szudrowicz; Poland | 7.87 m |
| Triple jump | Jörg Drehmel; East Germany | 17.16 m w | Viktor Saneyev; Soviet Union | 17.10 m w | Carol Corbu; Romania | 16.87 m |
| Shot put | Hartmut Briesenick; East Germany | 21.08 m CR | Heinz-Joachim Rothenburg; East Germany | 20.47 m | Władysław Komar; Poland | 20.04 m |
| Discus throw | Ludvík Daněk; Czechoslovakia | 63.90 m CR | Lothar Milde; East Germany | 61.62 m | Géza Fejér; Hungary | 61.54 m |
| Hammer throw | Uwe Beyer; West Germany | 72.36 m | Reinhard Theimer; East Germany | 71.80 m | Anatoliy Bondarchuk; Soviet Union | 71.40 m |
| Javelin throw | Jānis Lūsis; Soviet Union | 90.68 m | Jānis Doniņš; Soviet Union | 85.30 m | Wolfgang Hanisch; East Germany | 84.22 m |
| Decathlon | Joachim Kirst; East Germany | 8196 pts CR | Lennart Hedmark; Sweden | 8038 pts | Hans-Joachim Walde; West Germany | 7951 pts |

== Women's results ==
=== Track ===
1966 |1969 |1971 |1974 |1978

| Event | Gold | | Silver | | Bronze | |
|---|---|---|---|---|---|---|
| 100 metres | Renate Stecher; East Germany | 11.35 =CR | Ingrid Mickler; West Germany | 11.46 | Elfgard Schittenhelm; West Germany | 11.51 |
| 200 metres | Renate Stecher; East Germany | 22.70 CR | Györgyi Balogh; Hungary | 23.26 | Irena Szewińska; Poland | 23.32 |
| 400 metres | Helga Seidler; East Germany | 52.14 | Inge Bödding; West Germany | 52.90 | Ingelore Lohse; East Germany | 52.93 |
| 800 metres | Vera Nikolić; Yugoslavia | 2:00.00 CR | Pat Lowe; Great Britain | 2:01.66 | Rosemary Stirling; Great Britain | 2:02.08 |
| 1500 metres | Karin Burneleit; East Germany | 4:09.62 WR, CR, | Gunhild Hoffmeister; East Germany | 4:10.31 | Ellen Tittel; West Germany | 4:10.35 |
| 100 metres hurdles | Karin Balzer; East Germany | 12.94 CR | Annelie Ehrhardt; East Germany | 12.96 | Teresa Sukniewicz; Poland | 13.21 |
| 4 × 100 metres relay | Elfgard Schittenhelm; Inge Helten; Annegret Irrgang; Ingrid Mickler; West Germany (FRG) | 43.28 CR | Karin Balzer; Renate Stecher; Petra Vogt; Ellen Stropahl; East Germany (GDR) | 43.62 | Lyudmila Zharkova; Galina Bukharina; Marina Sidorova; Nadezhda Besfamilnaya; Soviet Union (URS) | 44.45 |
| 4 × 400 metres relay | Rita Kühne; Ingelore Lohse; Helga Seidler; Monika Zehrt; East Germany (GDR) | 3:29.28 CR | Anette Rückes; Christel Frese; Hildegard Falck; Inge Bödding; West Germany (FRG) | 3:33.04 | Raissa Nikaronova; Vera Popkova; Nadezhda Kolesnikova; Natalya Chistyakova; Soviet Union (URS) | 3:34.11 |

=== Field ===
1966 |1969 |1971 |1974 |1978

| Event | Gold | | Silver | | Bronze | |
|---|---|---|---|---|---|---|
| High jump | Ilona Gusenbauer; Austria | 1.87 m CR | Cornelia Popescu; Romania | 1.85 m | | |
| High jump | Ilona Gusenbauer; Austria | 1.87 m CR | Barbara Inkpen; Great Britain | 1.85 m | | |
| Long jump | Ingrid Mickler; West Germany | 6.76 m CR | Meta Antenen; Switzerland | 6.73 m | Heide Rosendahl; West Germany | 6.66 m |
| Shot put | Nadezhda Chizhova; Soviet Union | 20.16 m | Marita Lange; East Germany | 19.25 m | Margitta Gummel; East Germany | 19.22 m |
| Discus throw | Faina Melnik; Soviet Union | 64.22 m WR, CR | Liesel Westermann; West Germany | 61.68 m | Lyudmila Muravyova; Soviet Union | 59.48 m |
| Javelin throw | Daniela Jaworska; Poland | 61.00 m CR | Ameli Koloska; West Germany | 59.40 m | Ruth Fuchs; East Germany | 59.16 m |
| Pentathlon | Heide Rosendahl; West Germany | 4675 pts | Burglinde Pollak; East Germany | 4638 pts | Margrit Herbst; East Germany | 4570 pts |

== Medal table ==
* Host nation (Finland)

| Rank | Nation | Gold | Silver | Bronze | Total |
|---|---|---|---|---|---|
| 1 | East Germany (GDR) | 12 | 13 | 7 | 32 |
| 2 | Soviet Union (URS) | 9 | 3 | 8 | 20 |
| 3 | West Germany (FRG) | 5 | 7 | 5 | 17 |
| 4 | Czechoslovakia (TCH) | 2 | 1 | 1 | 4 |
| 5 | France (FRA) | 2 | 1 | 0 | 3 |
| 6 | Finland (FIN)* | 2 | 0 | 0 | 2 |
| 7 | Great Britain (GBR) | 1 | 4 | 5 | 10 |
| 8 | Poland (POL) | 1 | 3 | 5 | 9 |
| 9 | Italy (ITA) | 1 | 1 | 3 | 5 |
| 10 | Austria (AUT) | 1 | 0 | 0 | 1 |
| 10 | Belgium (BEL) | 1 | 0 | 0 | 1 |
| 10 | Yugoslavia (YUG) | 1 | 0 | 0 | 1 |
| 13 | Romania (ROU) | 0 | 2 | 1 | 3 |
| 14 | Sweden (SWE) | 0 | 2 | 0 | 2 |
| 15 | Hungary (HUN) | 0 | 1 | 1 | 2 |
| 16 | Switzerland (SUI) | 0 | 1 | 0 | 1 |
| 17 | Greece (GRE) | 0 | 0 | 1 | 1 |
| Totals (17 entries) | | 38 | 39 | 37 | 114 |

== Participation ==
According to an unofficial count, 871 athletes from 29 countries participated in the event, fourteen athletes more than the official number of 857 as published.

- Austria (16)
- Belgium (16)
- Bulgaria (12)
- Czechoslovakia (32)
- Denmark (14)
- East Germany (68)
- Finland (48)
- France (67)
- Gibraltar (1)
- Great Britain (65)
- Greece (4)
- Hungary (42)
- Iceland (3)
- Ireland (9)
- Italy (47)
- Liechtenstein (1)
- Luxembourg (1)
- Netherlands (20)
- Norway (30)
- Poland (65)
- Portugal (5)
- Romania (18)
- Soviet Union (84)
- Spain (16)
- Sweden (43)
- Switzerland (20)
- Turkey (9)
- West Germany (88)
- Yugoslavia (27)
