= Ferdinand Freudenstein =

American physicist and engineer (1926–2006)

- Ferdinand Freudenstein
- Born: May 12, 1926; Frankfurt, Germany
- Died: March 30, 2006 (aged 79)
- Education: New York University; Harvard University; Columbia University
- Known for: works in programming computation and kinematics
- Awards: National Academy of Engineering, National Academy of Sciences
- Scientific career
- Fields: Physics, mechanical engineering

Ferdinand Freudenstein (12 May 1926 – 30 March 2006) was an American physicist and engineer known as the "Father of Modern Kinematics." Freudenstein applied digital computation to the kinematic synthesis of mechanisms. In his Ph.D. dissertation, he developed what became known as the Freudenstein equation, which uses a simple algebraic method to synthesize planar four-bar function generators.

== Early life ==
Ferdinand Freudenstein was born into a Jewish family, on May 12, 1926, in Frankfurt, Germany. He was the son of a successful merchant George Freudenstein and Charlotte Rosenberg. At the age of ten, Freudenstein — along with his parents and two sisters — fled Nazi Germany for refuge in the Netherlands.

In the spring of 1937, Freudenstein moved to England after having spent six months in the city of Amsterdam. In England, he joined his brother and studied in London. During Hitler's blitzkrieg, Freudenstein temporarily moved to Cambridge, England, for safety, and then spent several years in Llandudno, North Wales. Meanwhile, his father and brother were sent to exile in Australia by the British government which regarded all adult male German citizens as enemy of the state.

In 1942, when he was 16 years old, Ferdinand with his mother and two sisters sailed from England to Trinidad where they remained for six weeks before moving permanently to the United States.

== Education ==
Arriving in New York City in 1942, Freudenstein enrolled in New York University, studying two years before joining the US Army. After the army, he used the financial assistance granted by the GI Bill to study at Harvard University, where he earned his M.S. in mechanical engineering in 1948.

After receiving his M.S., Freudenstein worked as a development engineer for the American Optical Company in Buffalo, New York. After two years, Freudenstein decided to pursue a Ph.D. degree in Columbia University under the supervision of H. Dean Baker.

== Career ==
In 1954, Freudenstein was appointed as the associate professor of mechanical engineering in Columbia. Then in 1958, he was promoted to the chair of the university's Department of Mechanical Engineering and then full-ranking professor in 1959. Under his leadership, Columbia attracted numerous academics including mathematician Oenne Bottema and British mathematician Eric Primrose. In 1985, Freudenstein became Columbia's Higgins Professor of Mechanical Engineering, a position which he held until his retirement.

While working as a faculty at Columbia, Freudenstein also consulted for Bell Telephone Laboratories, IBM, and General Motors. His many consultations were later made into open publications.

As a professor, Freudenstein mentored many Ph.D. students, including current Stanford professor of mechanical engineering Bernard Roth, engineer George Sandor, and Texas A&M professor Norris Stubbs, a former Olympic sprinter. Freudenstein’s teaching became so influential across the world that a Freudenstein Academic Tree was created in his honor: His Ph.D. students, in turn, mentored younger students, so that — at the time of Freudenstein’s death — over 500 academics could claim membership in the Freudenstein "family tree."

Freudenstein's prominence in the field of kinematics of mechanisms inspired the publication of Modern Kinematics: Developments in the Last Forty Years, written during the celebration of his 65th birthday.

== Awards and recognition ==
Freudenstein was elected member of the National Academy of Engineering in 1979. He is an honorary member of the American Society of Mechanical Engineers, a Guggenheim Fellow and a recipient of the Egleston Medal conferred by Columbia University. Freudenstein had served on the advisor panels of the National Science Foundation and the United States Army Research Laboratory.

== See also ==
- Mechanical engineering
- Ivy League
- National Academy of Engineering
- Columbia University
