= Jerry Wisdom =

Bahamian sprinter

Personal information
- Nationality: Bahamian
- Born: 28 October 1947 Kingston, Jamaica
- Died: 8 August 2009 (aged 61)

Sport
- Sport: Sprinting
- Event: 4 × 100 metres relay
- College team: University of Texas at El Paso

Gerald Lloyd "Jerry" Wisdom (28 October 1947 – 8 August 2009) was a Bahamian sprinter. He competed in the men's 4 × 100 metres relay at the 1968 Summer Olympics.
