= Angelo Sguazzero =

Italian sprinter

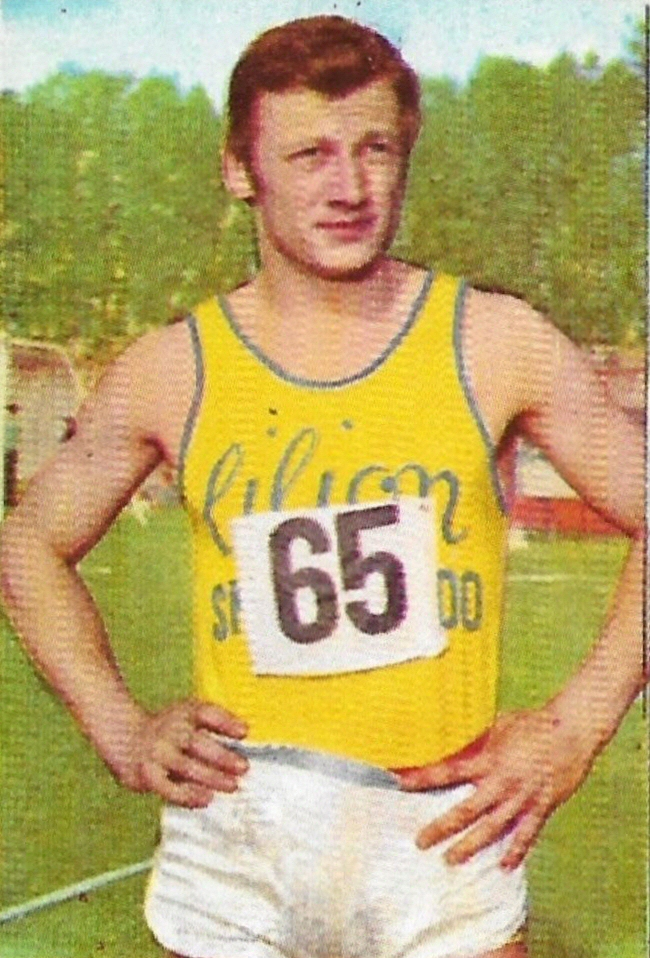

Personal information
- Nationality: Italian
- Born: January 4, 1946 (age 80) Como, Italy
- Height: 1.73 m (5 ft 8 in)
- Weight: 70 kg (150 lb)

Sport
- Country: Italy
- Sport: Athletics
- Event: Sprint
- Club: Snia Milano

Achievements and titles
- Personal best: 100 m: 10.3 (1966)

Angelo Sguazzero (born 4 January 1946, in Como) is a former Italian sprinter, that finished 7th with the national relay team on 4×100 metres relay at the 1968 Olympic Games.

== Biography ==
Angelo Sguazzero participated at one edition of the Summer Olympics (1968), he has 8 caps in national team from 1965 to 1969.

== Achievements ==
| Year | Competition | Venue | Position | Event | Performance | Note |
|---|---|---|---|---|---|---|
| 1968 | Olympic Games | Mexico City | 7th | 4×100 m relay | 39.22 | |

== See also ==
- Italy national relay team
