= Joseph Speake =

British sprinter

Personal information
- Nationality: British
- Born: 8 January 1944 (age 82)

Sport
- Sport: Sprinting
- Event: 4 × 100 metres relay

Joseph Speake (born 8 January 1944) is a British sprinter. He competed in the men's 4 × 100 metres relay at the 1968 Summer Olympics.
