= Ooi Hock Lim =

Malaysian sprinter

Personal information
- Nationality: Malaysian
- Born: 19 September 1943 (age 82)

Sport
- Sport: Sprinting
- Event: 4 × 100 metres relay

Ooi Hock Lim (born 19 September 1943) is a Malaysian sprinter. He competed in the men's 4 × 100 metres relay at the 1968 Summer Olympics.
