= Mel Pender =

American sprinter

Personal information
- Born: October 31, 1937 (age 88) Atlanta, Georgia, U.S.
Medal record
Men's athletics
Representing the United States
Olympic Games
Gold medal – first place	1968 Mexico City	4 × 100 m relay

Mel Pender
- Military career
- Allegiance: United States of America
- Branch: U.S. Army
- Service years: 1955–1976
- Rank: Captain
- Units: 82nd Airborne Division; 9th Infantry Division
- Conflicts: Cold War, Vietnam War
- Awards: Bronze Star

Melvin Pender Jr. (born October 31, 1937, in Atlanta, Georgia) competed as a runner in the 1964 and 1968 Olympics, winning an Olympic gold medal in the 4 × 100 m relay at the 1968 Summer Olympics. He had been a member of the Philadelphia Pioneer Track Club where he was coached by Alex Woodley, who had coached several other athletes who went on to participate in Olympic events.

== U.S. Army career ==
Pender enlisted in the U.S. Army at age 17. In 1960 he was assigned to the 82nd Airborne Division on Okinawa. Following the 1964 Tokyo Olympics, he returned to military service, graduating from Officer Candidate School in 1965. He was subsequently deployed to South Vietnam where he served with the 9th Infantry Division in the Mekong Delta. Subsequently he was ordered to return to the U.S. to train for 1968 Olympics in Mexico City.

After the 1968 Olympics, Pender returned to South Vietnam where he earned a Bronze Star Medal. Returning to the U.S. in August 1970, he then worked as assistant track and field coach and then as head track coach at the United States Military Academy at West Point. He later earned a bachelor's degree from Adelphi University. He retired from the Army in 1976 with the rank of Captain.

== Olympic athlete ==
While serving in the U.S. Army his incredible speed was noticed in camp football games. He was selected to the 1964 Olympic Team, but was hampered by injury and finished seventh in the 100 meters at Tokyo.

Nearing age 31, Pender again made it to the 100 m final, where his explosive start and exceptional acceleration brought him to the lead midway through the race, but he faded slightly and finished sixth. In the relay, he was chosen to run the second leg. The American team won the gold medal in a new world record of 38.24 seconds. He also set world records in the 50 yds at 5.0, 60 yds at 5.8, 70 yds at 6.8 and 100 meters at 9.9 seconds.
