= Enrique Labadie =

Mexican sprinter

Personal information
- Born: 14 November 1944 (age 81) Mexico City, Mexico

Sport
- Sport: Sprinting
- Event: 4 × 100 metres relay

Enrique Labadie (born 14 November 1944) is a Mexican sprinter. He competed in the men's 4 × 100 metres relay at the 1968 Summer Olympics.
