= Atta Kouakou =

Ivorian sprinter (1945–2010)

Personal information
- Nationality: Ivorian
- Born: 1945
- Died: 17 November 2010 (aged 64–65)

Sport
- Sport: Sprinting
- Event: 4 × 100 metres relay

Atta Kouakou (1945 – 17 November 2010) was an Ivorian sprinter. He competed in the men's 4 × 100 metres relay at the 1968 Summer Olympics, and finished seventh.
