= Larry Questad =

American sprinter (1943–2020)

Personal information
- Nationality: American
- Born: July 10, 1943 Livingston, Montana, USA
- Died: October 29, 2020 (aged 77) Boise, Idaho, USA
- Height: 188 cm (6 ft 2 in)
- Weight: 84 kg (185 lb)

Sport
- Sport: Athletics
- Event: Sprints
- Club: Southern California Striders, Anaheim

Lawrence Ronald "Larry" Questad (July 10, 1943 – October 29, 2020) was a track and field athlete from the United States who specialized in sprinting events.

== College career ==
He was a mediocre football and basketball player, but excelled at track at Park High School in Livingston, Montana. Questad went on to Stanford University, where he was the 1963 NCAA champion in the 100-yard dash sprint with a time of 9.7 seconds. Questad was a three-time All-American in the 100-yard dash, the 220, and the 440. His time in the 220, 20.74 seconds, remains the Stanford record, tied with James Lofton. He is a member of the school's Athletic Hall of Fame.

Questad finished runner-up in both the 100 and 200 yards events at the British 1963 AAA Championships.

== Olympics ==
Questad qualified for the 1968 Summer Olympics in the 200 meters and finished sixth in the final.

== After track ==
Questad purchased Superior Steel, a supplier of bulk storage and transportation tanks in Caldwell, Idaho, in 1995 and ran the business until 2011, when he sold it to his sons.

Questad died in Boise, Idaho, on October 29, 2020, following a lung infection and pneumonia.
