= Bärbel Podeswa =

East German hurdler (born 1946)

Personal information
- Born: 8 December 1946 (age 79) Naumburg, East Germany

Sport
- Sport: Track and field
Medal record
Representing East Germany
European Championships
Gold medal – first place	1969 Athens	4 × 100 m relay
Silver medal – second place	1969 Athens	100 m hurdles
European Indoor Championships
Silver medal – second place	1968 Madrid	50 m hurdles
Universiade
Silver medal – second place	1970 Turin	100 m hurdles

Bärbel Podeswa (née Weidlich; born 8 December 1946) is a retired East German hurdler.

She won the silver medal in 50 m hurdles at the 1968 European Indoor Games, behind Karin Balzer. At the 1969 European Championships she won the silver medal in the 100 metres hurdles, again behind Karin Balzer, as well as a gold medal in 4 × 100 metres relay, together with teammates Renate Meißner, Regina Höfer and Petra Vogt. Podeswa then won the silver medal in the 100 metres hurdles at the 1970 Summer Universiade, where she also competed in the 100 metres without reaching the final.

Domestically, she won the silver medal at the 1969 East German championships as well as the bronze medals in 1967, 1970 and 1972. Indoors, she won the bronze in 1966 and silver in 1968. She competed for the club SC Chemie Halle.
