= Boy Akba Diby =

Ivorian sprinter

Personal information
- Nationality: Ivorian
- Born: 1945 (age 80–81)

Sport
- Sport: Sprinting
- Event: 4 × 100 metres relay

Boy Akba Diby (born 1945) is an Ivorian sprinter. He competed in the men's 4 × 100 metres relay at the 1968 Summer Olympics.
