= William Quaye =

Ghanaian sprinter

Personal information
- Nationality: Ghanaian
- Born: 29 March 1941 (age 85)

Sport
- Sport: Sprinting
- Event: 4 × 100 metres relay

Achievements and titles
- Olympic finals: 1968 Summer Olympics

William Quaye (born 29 March 1941) is a Ghanaian sprinter. He competed in the men's 4 × 100 metres relay at the 1968 Summer Olympics.
