= José Triana (athlete) =

Cuban sprinter

Personal information
- Born: 30 November 1948 (age 77) Florida, Camagüey, Cuba

Sport
- Sport: Track and field
Medal record
Representing Cuba
Pan American Games
Silver medal – second place	1975 Mexico City	4 x 100 m relay
Central American and Caribbean Games
Gold medal – first place	1970 Panama City	4x100m relay
Gold medal – first place	1974 Santo Domingo	4x100m relay
Silver medal – second place	1974 Santo Domingo	100m
Bronze medal – third place	1974 Santo Domingo	200m
Summer Universiade
Silver medal – second place	1970 Turin	4x100m relay

José Triana Matamoros (born 30 November 1948) is a Cuban former track and field athlete who competed as a short-distance sprinter during the late 1960s and 1970s. As part of Cuba's relay squads, Triana is a two-time Central American and Caribbean Games gold medalist in the 4×100 meters relay (1970 and 1974) and a silver medalist at the 1970 Summer Universiade.

He represented Cuba at the 1972 Summer Olympics in Munich, competing in the men's 4×100 meters relay alongside Pablo Montes, Hermes Ramírez, and Juan Morales. He also achieved individual success at the 1974 Central American and Caribbean Games, securing the silver medal in the 100-meter sprint and the bronze medal in the 200-meter sprint.

== Early life and career ==
He was born on 30 November 1948 in Florida, Camagüey.

In 1970, he won the gold medal in the 4 × 100 meters relay at the 1970 Central American and Caribbean Games with his teammates, Pablo Montes, Juan Morales, and Hermes Ramírez, with a time of 39.4 seconds, followed by Colombia and Puerto Rico. In the same year, he also won a silver medal in the 1970 Summer Universiade for the same sport

Then, in 1972, he competed in the Summer Olympics, placing 5th in heat 1 of round 2, with the same teammate he had at the Central American and Caribbean Games in 1970.

During his second participation in the Central American and Caribbean Games in 1974, he won the gold medal in the same category with Montes, Leonard, and 39.62 seconds, followed by the Dominican Republic and the Netherlands Antilles. Other than the 4 × 100 meters relay, he also competed in other categories and won the silver medal in the 100m sprint the bronze medal in the 200m sprint.

== International competitions ==
Year	Competition	Venue	Position	Event	Notes
Representing Cuba
1969	Central American and Caribbean Championships	Havana, Cuba	2nd	100 m	10.7
1970	Central American and Caribbean Games	Panama City, Panama	1st	4 × 100 m relay	39.4
1970	Universiade	Turin, Italy	5th	100 m	10.6
1970	Universiade	Turin, Italy	2nd	4 × 100 m relay	39.2
1972	Olympic Games	Munich, West Germany	7th (sf)	4 × 100 m relay	39.04
1973	Central American and Caribbean Championships	Maracaibo, Venezuela	2nd	100 m	10.2
1973	Central American and Caribbean Championships	Maracaibo, Venezuela	2nd	4 × 100 m relay	40.2
1974	Central American and Caribbean Games	Santo Domingo, Dominican Republic	2nd	100 m	10.67
1974	Central American and Caribbean Games	Santo Domingo, Dominican Republic	3rd	200 m	21.54
1974	Central American and Caribbean Games	Santo Domingo, Dominican Republic	1st	4 × 100 m relay	39.62
1975	Pan American Games	Mexico City, Mexico	2nd	4 × 100 m relay	38.46

== Personal bests ==
- 100 metres – 10.1 (Dresden 1972).
