= Rajalingam Gunaratnam =

Malaysian sprinter

Personal information
- Nationality: Malaysian
- Born: 14 December 1941 (age 84)

Sport
- Sport: Sprinting
- Event: 200 metres

Rajalingam Gunaratnam (born 14 December 1941) is a Malaysian sprinter. He competed in the men's 200 metres at the 1968 Summer Olympics.
