= Félix Bécquer =

Mexican sprinter

Personal information
- Born: 1 February 1947 (age 79) Mexico City, Mexico

Sport
- Sport: Sprinting
- Event: 100 metres

Félix Bécquer (born 1 February 1947) is a Mexican sprinter. He competed in the men's 100 metres at the 1968 Summer Olympics.
