= Ladislav Kříž =

Czech former athlete (born 1944)

Medal record

Men's athletics

Representing Czechoslovakia

European Championships
Gold medal – first place	1971 Helsinki	4×100 m
Bronze medal – third place	1969 Athens	4×100 m

Ladislav Kříž (born 28 January 1944) is a Czech former athlete who competed in the 1972 Summer Olympics.
