= Luděk Bohman =

Czechoslovak sprinter

Medal record

Men's athletics

Representing Czechoslovakia

European Championships
Gold medal – first place	1971 Helsinki	4×100 m
Bronze medal – third place	1969 Athens	4×100 m

Luděk Bohman (born 2 December 1946 in Nymburk) is a former Czechoslovak athlete who competed in the 1972 Summer Olympics.

He is the father of sprinter Ludvík Bohman and bobsledder Martin Bohman.
