= Peter Haase =

German sprinter

Personal information
- Nationality: German
- Born: 23 January 1943 (age 83)

Sport
- Sport: Sprinting
- Event: 4 × 100 metres relay

Peter Haase (born 23 January 1943) is a German sprinter. He competed in the men's 4 × 100 metres relay at the 1968 Summer Olympics representing East Germany.
