= Pablo Montes (athlete) =

Cuban sprinter

Personal information
- Full name: Pablo Montes Casanova
- Born: November 23, 1947 Vedado, Havana, Cuba
- Died: October 26, 2008 (aged 60) Havana, Cuba
- Height: 1.84 m (6 ft 0 in)
- Weight: 83 kg (183 lb)
Medal record
Men's athletics
Representing Cuba
Olympic Games
| Silver medal – second place | 1968 Mexico City | 4 x 100 m relay |
Pan American Games
| Silver medal – second place | 1975 Mexico City | 4 x 100 m relay |
| Bronze medal – third place | 1967 Winnipeg | 200 metres |
Central American and Caribbean Games
| Gold medal – first place | 1970 Panama City | 100 metres |
| Gold medal – first place | 1970 Panama City | 200 metres |
| Gold medal – first place | 1970 Panama City | 4x100m relay |
| Bronze medal – third place | 1974 Santo Domingo | 100 metres |
Summer Universiade
| Silver medal – second place | 1970 Turin | 4x100m relay |

Pablo Montes Casanova (November 23, 1947 – October 26, 2008) was a Cuban sprinter who competed in short-distance track events. He achieved international prominence at the 1968 Summer Olympics in Mexico City, where he ran the third leg of the men's 4 × 100 meters relay alongside Hermes Ramírez, Juan Morales, and Enrique Figuerola and got a silver medal, while also finishing fourth in the individual 100-meter sprint with a time of 10.14 seconds.

His international career began with a bronze medal in the 200 meters at the 1967 Pan American Games. He later achieved a three-gold-medal sweep at the 1970 Central American and Caribbean Games, winning the 100 meters, 200 meters, and the 4 × 100 meters relay. Montes died from a heart attack in 2008.

== Early life and career ==
He was born on 23 November 1947 in Vedado, Havana.

His international career began with a bronze medal in the 200 m sprint at the 1967 Pan American Games and fourth place in the 400 m sprint.

In 1968, he competed in the 1968 Summer Olympics in a few sports. He competed in the 100 m sprint and placed 4th in 10.100 seconds. In the same event, he won a silver medal in the 4 × 100 meters relay with Hermes Ramírez, Juan Morales, and Enrique Figuerola, running the third leg.

At the 1970 Central American and Caribbean Games, he won three gold medals in all the sports he competed in. He won a gold medal in the 100 m sprint, 200 m sprint, and 4 × 100 meters relay with his teammates, José Triana, Juan Morales, and Hermes Ramírez, with a time of 39.4 seconds, followed by Colombia and Puerto Rico.

== Death ==
He died of heart attack in 2008.

== International competitions ==
| Year | Competition | Venue | Position | Event | Notes |
Representing Cuba
| 1967 | Pan American Games | Winnipeg, Canada | 3rd | 200 m | 21.0 |
| 1967 | Pan American Games | Winnipeg, Canada | 6th | 400 m | 46.88 |
| 1967 | Pan American Games | Winnipeg, Canada | 2nd | 4 × 100 m relay | 39.26 |
| 1968 | Olympic Games | Mexico City, Mexico | 4th | 100 m | 10.14 |
| 1968 | Olympic Games | Mexico City, Mexico | 2nd | 4 × 100 m relay | 38.40 |
| 1969 | Central American and Caribbean Championships | Havana, Cuba | – | 4 × 100 m relay | DNF |
| 1970 | Central American and Caribbean Games | Panama City, Panama | 1st | 100 m | 10.24 |
| 1970 | Central American and Caribbean Games | Panama City, Panama | 1st | 200 m | 21.20 |
| 1970 | Central American and Caribbean Games | Panama City, Panama | 1st | 4 × 100 m relay | 39.4 |
| 1970 | Universiade | Turin, Italy | 6th | 100 m | 10.6 |
| 1970 | Universiade | Turin, Italy | 2nd | 4 × 100 m relay | 39.2 |
| 1971 | Central American and Caribbean Championships | Kingston, Jamaica | 3rd | 100 m | 10.4 |
| 1971 | Central American and Caribbean Championships | Kingston, Jamaica | 3rd | 200 m | 21.3 |
| 1971 | Pan American Games | Cali, Colombia | 4th | 100 m | 10.40 |
| 1971 | Pan American Games | Cali, Colombia | 2nd | 4 × 100 m relay | 39.84 |
| 1972 | Olympic Games | Munich, West Germany | 7th (sf) | 4 × 100 m relay | 39.04 |
| 1973 | Universiade | Moscow, Soviet Union | 6th | 100 m | 10.59 |
| 1974 | Central American and Caribbean Games | Santo Domingo, Dominican Republic | 3rd | 100 m | 10.77 |
| 1974 | Central American and Caribbean Games | Santo Domingo, Dominican Republic | 1st | 4 × 100 m relay | 39.62 |
| 1975 | Pan American Games | Mexico City, Mexico | 6th | 200 m | 21.35 |
| 1975 | Pan American Games | Mexico City, Mexico | 2nd | 4 × 100 m relay | 38.46 |

== Personal bests ==
- 100 metres – 10.14 (+0.6 m/s, Mexico City 1968)
- 200 metres – 20.88 (NWI, Havana 1975)
- 400 metres – 46.7h (Winnipeg 1967)
