= Robert Ojo =

Nigerian sprinter

Personal information
- Nationality: Nigerian
- Born: 29 April 1941 Ikare, British Nigeria
- Died: 27 March 2014 (aged 72) Ibadan, Nigeria
- Height: 180 cm (5 ft 11 in)
- Weight: 70 kg (154 lb)

Sport
- Sport: Athletics
- Event: Sprinting/400m

Robert Ojo (29 April 1941 – 27 March 2014) was a Nigerian sprinter. He competed in the men's 100 metres at the 1968 Summer Olympics.

Ojo finished third behind David Jenkins in the 400 metres event at the British 1972 AAA Championships.
