= Norris Stubbs =

Bahamian sprinter

Personal information
- Nationality: Bahamian
- Born: 8 November 1948 Nassau, Bahamas
- Died: 9 August 2014 (aged 65)

Sport
- Sport: Sprinting
- Event: 100 metres

Norris Stubbs (8 November 1948 – 9 August 2014) was a Bahamian sprinter and college professor. He competed in the men's 100 metres at the 1968 Summer Olympics.

He completed his undergraduate degree at Grinnell College before attending Columbia University. There he studied under Ferdinand Freudenstein, receiving his doctoral degree in Engineering Mechanics in 1976. He spent the majority of his professional career as a professor in the department of Civil Engineering at Texas A&M
