= Stanisław Wagner =

Polish sprinter

Personal information
- Born: 11 November 1947 (age 78) Starkówko, Poland
- Height: 1.65 m (5 ft 5 in)
- Weight: 63 kg (139 lb)

Sport
- Sport: Track and field
- Club: AZS Łódź
Medal record
Representing Poland
Summer Universiade
Gold medal – first place	1970 Turin	4x100m relay

Stanisław Wagner (born 11 November 1947) is a Polish former sprinter who competed in the 1972 Summer Olympics.

== International competitions ==
Year	Competition	Venue	Position	Event	Notes
Representing Poland
1966	European Junior Games	Odessa, Soviet Union	4th	100 m	10.8
1966	European Junior Games	Odessa, Soviet Union	4th	200 m	21.6
1966	European Junior Games	Odessa, Soviet Union	3rd	4 × 100 m relay	41.0
1969	European Championships	Athens, Greece	4th	4 × 100 m relay	39.55
1970	European Cup Final	Stockholm, Sweden	2nd	4 × 100 m relay	39.5
1970	Universiade	Turin, Italy	39th (h)	100 m	10.9
1970	Universiade	Turin, Italy	1st	4 × 100 m relay	39.2
1972	Olympic Games	Munich, West Germany	32nd (qf)	100 m	10.61
1972	Olympic Games	Munich, West Germany	6th	4 × 100 m relay	39.03

== Personal bests ==
Outdoor

- 100 metres – 10.2h (Warsaw 1972)
- 200 metres – 21.0h (Otwock 1973)

Indoor

- 60 metres – 6.58 (Zabrze 1973)
