= Oleksiy Khlopotnov =

Ukrainian sprinter

Personal information
- Nationality: Ukrainian
- Born: 17 August 1946 (age 79) Chernihiv, Soviet Union

Sport
- Sport: Sprinting
- Event: 100 metres

Oleksiy Khlopotnov (born 17 August 1946) is a Ukrainian sprinter. He competed in the men's 100 metres at the 1968 Summer Olympics representing the Soviet Union.
