= Hartmut Schelter =

German sprinter

Personal information
- Nationality: German
- Born: 22 May 1943 (age 83)

Sport
- Sport: Sprinting
- Event: 100 metres

Hartmut Schelter (born 22 May 1943) is a German sprinter. He competed in the men's 100 metres at the 1968 Summer Olympics representing East Germany.
