= Yevgeny Sinyayev =

Soviet sprinter

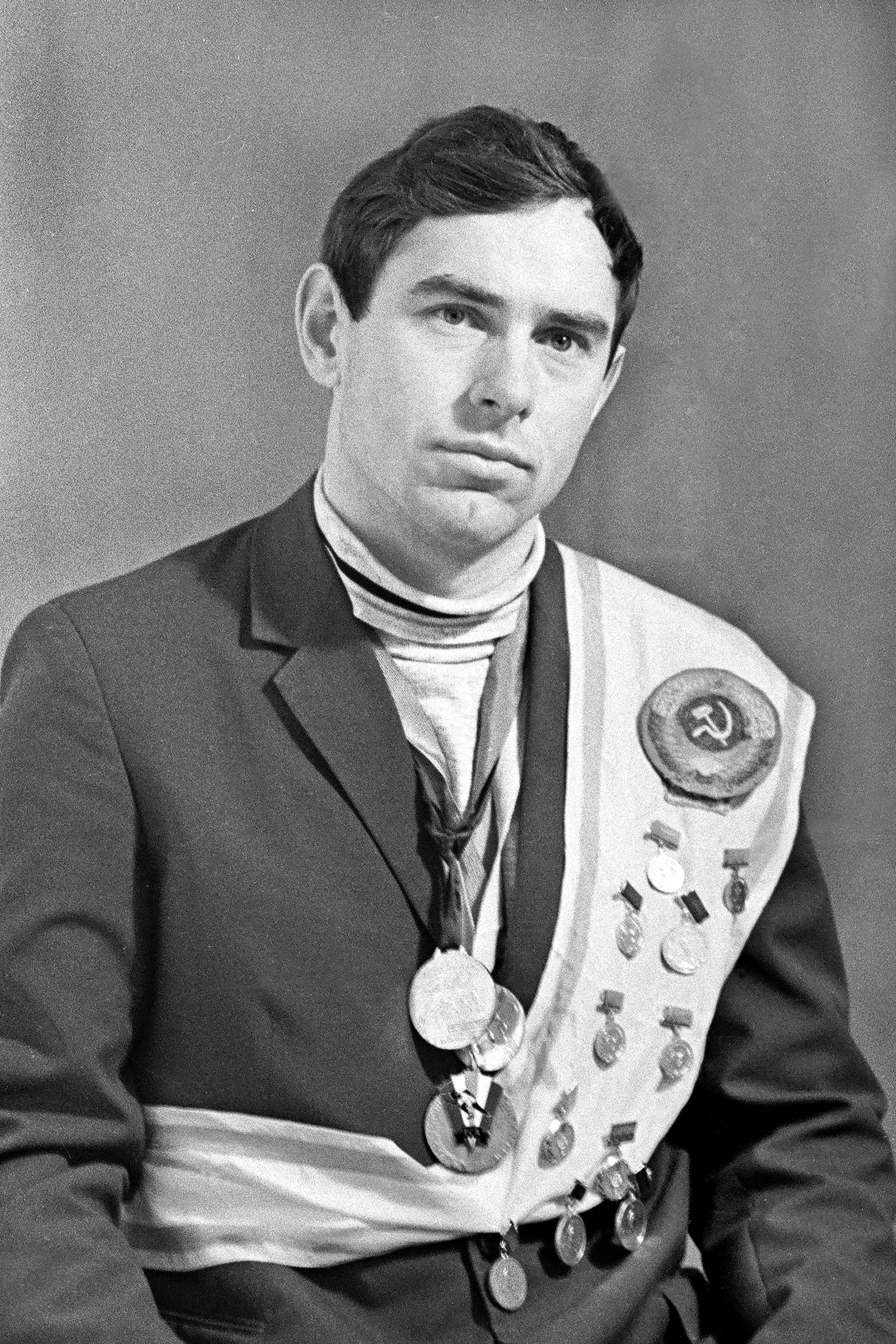

Personal information
- Nationality: Soviet
- Born: 2 January 1948
- Died: 11 August 2006 (aged 58)

Sport
- Sport: Sprinting
- Event: 100 metres

Yevgeny Sinyayev (2 January 1948 – 11 August 2006) was a Soviet sprinter. He competed in the men's 100 metres at the 1968 Summer Olympics.
