= Karl-Peter Schmidtke =

German sprinter

Personal information
- Nationality: German
- Born: 16 December 1945 (age 80) Boek (part of Gorlosen), Germany

Sport
- Sport: Sprinting
- Event: 100 metres

Karl-Peter Schmidtke (born 16 December 1945) is a German sprinter. He competed in the men's 100 metres at the 1968 Summer Olympics representing West Germany.
