= Morgan Gesmalla =

Sudanese sprinter

Personal information
- Nationality: Sudanese
- Born: 1947 (age 78–79)

Sport
- Sport: Sprinting
- Event: 100 metres

Morgan Gesmalla (born 1947) is a Sudanese sprinter. He competed in the men's 100 metres at the 1968 Summer Olympics.
