= Miguel Ángel González (sprinter) =

Mexican sprinter

Personal information
- Born: 3 July 1944 (age 82) Mexico City, Mexico

Sport
- Sport: Sprinting
- Event: 100 metres

Miguel Ángel González (born 3 July 1944) is a retired Mexican sprinter. He competed in the men's 100 meters at the 1968 Summer Olympics.
