= Valentin Maslakov =

Belarusian sprinter

Personal information
- Nationality: Belarusian
- Born: 4 December 1944 (age 81) Gomel, Soviet Union

Sport
- Sport: Sprinting
- Event: 200 metres
Medal record
Representing Soviet Union
Summer Universiade
Bronze medal – third place	1970 Turin	4x100m relay

Valentin Mikhaylovich Maslakov (born 4 December 1944) is a Belarusian sprinter. He competed in the men's 200 metres at the 1968 Summer Olympics representing the Soviet Union.
