= Roger Colglazier =

American sprinter (born 1950)

Personal information
- Born: August 28, 1950 (age 75) Davenport, Iowa, United States

Sport
- Sport: Track and field
- Club: Abilene Christian Wildcats
Medal record
Representing United States
Summer Universiade
Gold medal – first place	1970 Turin	4x400m relay

Roger Colglazier (born August 28, 1950) is an American former sprinter. He competed for the Abilene Christian Wildcats and graduated in University of Texas in 1976.
