= Pasqualino Abeti =

Italian sprinter (1948–2024)

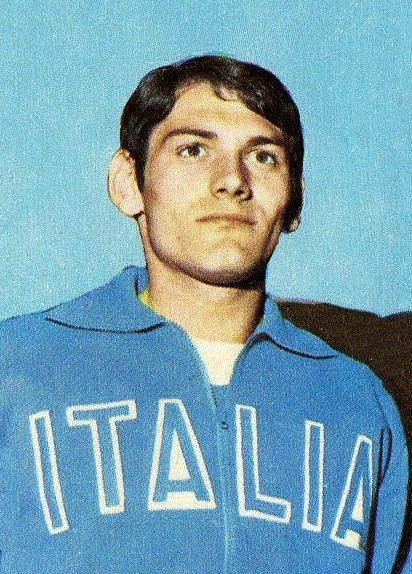
- Abeti circa 1970

Personal information
- National team: Italy
- Born: 2 April 1948 Correggio, Italy
- Died: 24 February 2024 (aged 75) Correggio, Italy
- Height: 1.73 m (5 ft 8 in)
- Weight: 66 kg (146 lb)

Sport
- Sport: Athletics
- Event: Sprint

Achievements and titles
- Personal best: 200 m: 20.7 (1972)
Medal record
Men's athletics
Representing Italy
European Championships
Bronze medal – third place	1971 Helsinki	4×100 m

Pasqualino Abeti (2 April 1948 – 24 February 2024) was an Italian sprinter who competed in the 1972 Summer Olympics. He was part of the Italian 4 × 100 m relay team that won the gold medal at the 1971 Mediterranean Games.

Abeti died on 24 February 2024, at the age of 75.

== Biography ==
In the "Pietro Mennea era", Pasqualino Abeti won three national titles in the 100 and 200 m events, in 1969 and 1975.

== National titles ==
He won 7 national championships.

- Italian Athletics Championships
  - 100 metres: 1969, 1975
  - 200 metres: 1969, 1975
- Italian Athletics Indoor Championships
  - 60 metres: 1970
  - 200 metres: 1980
  - 400 metres: 1973
