= Jiří Kynos =

Czech sprinter

Personal information
- Born: 24 March 1943 (age 83) Třebechovice pod Orebem, Protectorate of Bohemia and Moravia

Sport
- Sport: Track and field
Medal record
Representing Czechoslovakia
European Championships
Gold medal – first place	1971 Helsinki	4×100 m
Bronze medal – third place	1969 Athens	4×100 m

Jiří Kynos (born 24 March 1943) is a Czech former track and field sprinter who competed in the 1972 Summer Olympics. He competed in the 200 metres and 4 × 100 metres relay races, and helped Czechoslovakia finish 4th in the 4 × 100 at the Olympics. At the 1971 European championships, he helped Czechoslovakia win 1st in the 4x100 metres relay.
