= Vladislav Sapeya =

Belarusian sprinter

Personal information
- Nationality: Belarusian
- Born: 11 June 1943 (age 83) Vileyka, Soviet Union

Sport
- Sport: Sprinting
- Event: 100 metres
Medal record
Men's athletics
Representing Soviet Union
European Championships
Silver medal – second place	1969 Athens	4×100 m relay
Summer Universiade
Bronze medal – third place	1970 Turin	4x100m relay

Vladislav Vladimirovich Sapeya (Russian: Владислав Сапея; born 11 June 1943) is a Belarusian sprinter. He competed in the men's 100 metres at the 1968 Summer Olympics representing the Soviet Union.
