= Jochen Eigenherr =

German sprinter

Personal information
- Nationality: German
- Born: 18 February 1947 (age 79) Bevensen, Germany

Sport
- Sport: Sprinting
- Event: 200 metres

Joachim "Jochen" Eigenherr (born 18 February 1947) is a German former sprinter. He competed in the men's 200 metres at the 1968 Summer Olympics representing West Germany.
