= Gérard Fenouil =

French sprinter (1945–2023)

Medal record

Men's athletics

Representing France

Olympic Games
Bronze medal – third place	1968 Mexico City	4×100 m

European Championships
Gold medal – first place	1969 Athens	4×100 m

Gérard Fenouil (23 June 1945 – 8 October 2023) was a French athlete who mainly competed in the 100 metres.

Born in Paris, he competed for France in the 1968 Summer Olympics held in Mexico City, Mexico, where he won the bronze medal in the 4 × 100 metre relay with his teammates Jocelyn Delecour, Claude Piquemal and Roger Bambuck. Fenouil died in Sables d'Olonne on 8 October 2023, at the age of 78.

== Sources ==
- Sports Reference
