= Ennio Preatoni =

Italian sprinter

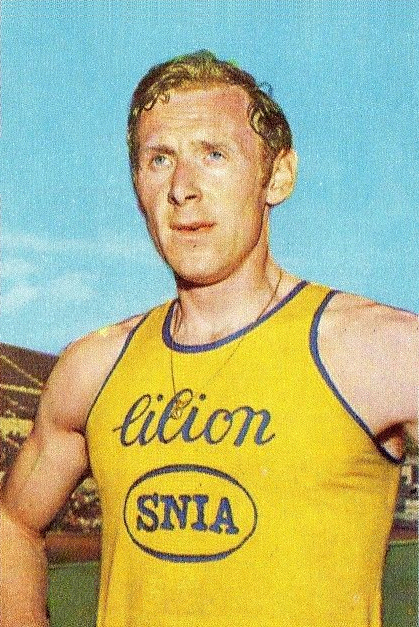

Personal information
- Nationality: Italian
- Born: 11 December 1944 (age 81) Garbagnate Milanese, Italy
- Height: 1.84 m (6 ft 1/2 in)
- Weight: 82 kg (181 lb)

Sport
- Country: Italy
- Sport: Athletics
- Event: Sprint
- Club: Snia Milano

Achievements and titles
- Personal best: 100 m: 10.2 (1970)
Medal record
Men's athletics
Representing Italy
European Championships
Bronze medal – third place	1971 Helsinki	4×100 m relay
Summer Universiade
Gold medal – first place	1967 Tokyo	4×100 m relay
Mediterranean Games
Gold medal – first place	1967 Tunis	4×100 m relay
Gold medal – first place	1971 Izmir	4×100 m relay
Bronze medal – third place	1967 Tunis	100 m

Ennio Preatoni (born 11 December 1944) is a retired Italian sprinter. He competed at the 1964, 1968 and 1972 Olympics and reached the final of the 4 × 100 m relay event in 1964, 1968 and 1972. Preatoni won an individual bronze and two relay gold medals at the Mediterranean Games.

== Olympic results ==
Year	Competition	Venue	Position	Event	Performance	Note
1964	Olympic Games	Tokyo	7th	4 × 100 m relay	39.5	
1968	Olympic Games	Mexico City	Heat	100 metres	10.6	
1968	Olympic Games	Mexico City	7th	4 × 100 m relay	39.2	
1972	Olympic Games	(West Germany) Munich	8th	4 × 100 m relay	39.14	

== National titles ==
- Italian Athletics Championships
  - 100 metres: 1968, 1970

== See also ==
- Italy national relay team
