= Patrick Bourbeillon =

French sprinter

Personal information
- Born: 24 March 1947 Angers, France
- Died: 13 July 2015 (aged 70) Bayonne, France

Sport
- Sport: Track and field
Medal record
Representing France
European Championships
Gold medal – first place	1969 Athens	4×100 m

Patrick Pierre Yves Charles Bourbeillon (24 March 1947 – 13 July 2015) was a French athlete who competed in the 1972 Summer Olympics. He was born in Angers.
