= Ralph Banthorpe =

British sprinter (born 1949)

Personal information
- Nationality: British (English)
- Born: 6 February 1949 (age 77) Wolverhampton, England
- Height: 174 cm (5 ft 9 in)
- Weight: 63 kg (139 lb)

Sport
- Sport: Athletics
- Event: Sprinting
- Club: WBAC

Ralph Banthorpe (born 6 February 1949) is a British retired international sprinter who competed at the 1968 Summer Olympics.

== Biography ==
Banthorpe lived on Lingfield Avenue in Wolverhampton, and attended Wolverhampton Municipal Grammar School (now the Colton Hills Community School). He studied Dentistry at the University of Birmingham.

He finished second behind South African Paul Nash in the 220 yards event at the 1968 AAA Championships but by virtue of being the highest placed British athlete was considered the British 220 yards champion.

At the 1968 Summer Olympics in Mexico City, he represented Great Britain in the men's 200 metres.

He also represented England in the 200 metres, at the 1970 British Commonwealth Games in Edinburgh, Scotland.
