= 1969 European Athletics Championships =

9th European Athletics Championships
- Dates: 16–21 September
- Host city: Piraeus, Greece
- Venue: Georgios Karaiskakis Stadium
- Level: Senior
- Type: Outdoor
- Events: 38
- Participation: 674 athletes from 30 nations

The 1969 European Athletics Championships were the ninth European Athletics Championships which were held from 16–21 September 1969 at the Georgios Karaiskakis Stadium in Piraeus, Greece. New at these championships were the women's 1500 metres and the women's 4 × 400 metres relay event. Moreover, women's 80 metres hurdles was replaced by women's 100 metres hurdles. Contemporaneous reports on the event were given in the Glasgow Herald.

Former East German runner Jürgen May, who had defected, was not allowed to compete for his new country, West Germany, due to IAAF rules requiring him to live there for at least three years; he had competed for East Germany in the 1966 championships. West German officials promptly withdrew their athletes from all individual events in protest, but decided to compete in the relay races as a symbolic gesture to show their respect for the Greek organisers.

The Dutch decathlete Edward de Noorlander was disqualified for the use of amphetamine, the first disqualification for doping in athletics.

== Medal summary ==
Complete results were published.

=== Men ===
Event	Gold		Silver		Bronze	
100 metres	Valeriy Borzov (URS)	10.49	Alain Sarteur (FRA)	10.50	Philippe Clerc (SUI)	10.56
200 metres	Philippe Clerc (SUI)	20.70 CR	Herman Burde (GDR)	20.94	Zenon Nowosz (POL)	20.96
400 metres	Jan Werner (POL)	45.75 CR	Jean-Claude Nallet (FRA)	45.81	Stanisław Grędziński (POL)	45.83
800 metres	Dieter Fromm (GDR)	1:45.98 =CR	Jozef Plachý (TCH)	1:46.26	Manfred Matuschewski (GDR)	1:46.83
1500 metres	John Whetton (GBR)	3:39.45 CR	Frank Murphy (IRL)	3:39.51	Henryk Szordykowski (POL)	3:39.87
5000 metres	Ian Stewart (GBR)	13:44.8	Rashid Sharafetdinov (URS)	13:45.8	Alan Blinston (GBR)	13:47.6
10,000 metres	Jürgen Haase (GDR)	28:41.6	Michael Tagg (GBR)	28:43.2	Nikolay Sviridov (URS)	28:45.8
110 metres hurdles	Eddy Ottoz (ITA)	13.59 CR	David Hemery (GBR)	13.74	Alan Pascoe (GBR)	13.94
400 metres hurdles	Vyacheslav Skomorokhov (URS)	49.70	John Sherwood (GBR)	50.10	Andrew Todd (GBR)	50.38
3000 metres steeplechase	Mikhail Zhelev (BUL)	8:25.02 CR	Aleksandr Morozov (URS)	8:25.57	Vladimir Dudin (URS)	8:26.60
4 × 100 metres relay	France; Alain Sarteur; Patrick Bourbeillon; Gérard Fenouil; François St.-Gilles	38.89 CR	Soviet Union; Aleksandr Lebedev; Vladislav Sapeya; Nikolay Ivanov; Valeriy Borzov	39.40	Czechoslovakia; Ladislav Kříž; Dionys Szogedi; Jiří Kynos; Luděk Bohman	39.52
4 × 400 metres relay	France; Gilles Bertould; Christian Nicolau; Jacques Carette; Jean-Claude Nallet	3:02.30 CR	Soviet Union; Yevgeniy Borisenko; Boris Savchuk; Yuriy Zorin; Aleksandr Bratchikov	3:03.05	West Germany; Horst-Rüdiger Schlöske; Ingo Röper; Gerhard Hennige; Martin Jellinghaus	3:03.13
Marathon	Ron Hill (GBR)	2:16:47	Gaston Roelants (BEL)	2:17:22	Jim Alder (GBR)	2:19:05
20 kilometres walk	Paul Nihill (GBR)	1:30:48	Leonida Karaiosifoglu (ROU)	1:31:06	Nikolay Smaga (URS)	1:31:20
50 kilometres walk	Christoph Höhne (GDR)	4:12:32 CR	Peter Selzer (GDR)	4:16:09	Veniamin Soldatenko (URS)	4:23:04
High jump	Valentin Gavrilov (URS)	2.17 m	Reijo Vähälä (FIN)	2.17 m	Erminio Azzaro (ITA)	2.17 m
Pole vault	Wolfgang Nordwig (GDR)	5.30 m CR	Kjell Isaksson (SWE)	5.20 m	Aldo Righi (ITA)	5.10 m
Long jump^{[nb1]}	Igor Ter-Ovanesyan (URS)	8.17 m w	Lynn Davies (GBR)	8.07 m w	Tõnu Lepik (URS)	8.04 m w
Triple jump	Viktor Saneyev (URS)	17.34 m ^{[nb2]}	Zoltán Cziffra (HUN)	16.85 m	Klaus Neumann (GDR)	16.68 m
Shot put	Dieter Hoffmann (GDR)	20.12 m CR	Heinz-Joachim Rothenburg (GDR)	20.05 m	Hans-Peter Gies (GDR)	19.78 m
Discus throw	Hartmut Losch (GDR)	61.82 m CR	Ricky Bruch (SWE)	61.08 m	Lothar Milde (GDR)	59.34 m
Hammer throw	Anatoliy Bondarchuk (URS)	74.68 m (WR) CR	Romuald Klim (URS)	72.74 m	Reinhard Theimer (GDR)	72.02 m
Javelin throw	Jānis Lūsis (URS)	91.52 m CR	Pauli Nevala (FIN)	89.58 m	Janusz Sidło (POL)	82.90 m
Decathlon	Joachim Kirst (GDR)	8041 pts CR	Herbert Wessel (GDR)	7828 pts	Viktor Chelnikov (URS)	7801 pts

- ^{nb1} Max Klauß from East Germany jumped 8.00 in the final, which was a new championship record.
- ^{nb2} Probably wind assisted. As of statistic handbooks Viktor Saneyev's mark wasn't ratified as a new championship record.

=== Women ===
Event	Gold		Silver		Bronze	
100 metres	Petra Vogt (GDR)	11.66	Wilma van den Berg (NED)	11.74	Anita Neil (GBR)	11.81
200 metres	Petra Vogt (GDR)	23.30	Renate Meissner (GDR)	23.33	Val Peat (GBR)	23.34
400 metres	Nicole Duclos (FRA)	51.72 (WR) CR	Colette Besson (FRA)	51.74	Maria Sykora (AUT)	53.00
800 metres	Lillian Board (GBR)	2:01.4 CR	Annelise Damm Olesen (DEN)	2:02.6	Vera Nikolić (YUG)	2:02.6
1500 metres	Jaroslava Jehličková (TCH)	4:10.77 (WR)	Maria Gommers (NED)	4:11.90	Paola Pigni (ITA)	4:12.00
100 metres hurdles	Karin Balzer (GDR)	13.29	Bärbel Podeswa (GDR)	13.68	Teresa Nowak (POL)	13.77
4 × 100 metres relay	East Germany; Regina Hofer; Renate Meissner; Bärbel Podeswa; Petra Vogt	43.63 CR	West Germany; Bärbel Hohnle; Jutta Stock; Rita Jahn-Wilden; Ingrid Becker	44.09	Great Britain; Anita Neil; Denise Ramsden; Sheila Cooper; Val Peat	44.39
4 × 400 metres relay	Great Britain; Rosemary Stirling; Pat Lowe; Janet Simpson; Lillian Board	3:30.82 (WR)	France; Bernadette Martin; Nicole Duclos; Eliane Jacq; Colette Besson	3:30.85	West Germany; Christa Czekay; Antje Gleichfeld; Inge Eckhoff; Christel Frese	3:32.70
High jump	Miloslava Rezková (TCH)	1.83 m =CR	Antonina Lazareva (URS)	1.83 m	Mária Mračnová (TCH)	1.83 m
Long jump	Mirosława Sarna (POL)	6.49 m	Viorica Viscopoleanu (ROU)	6.45 m	Berit Berthelsen (NOR)	6.44 m
Shot put	Nadezhda Chizhova (URS)	20.43 m (WR) CR	Margitta Gummel (GDR)	19.58 m	Marita Lange (GDR)	19.56 m
Discus throw	Tamara Danilova (URS)	59.28 m CR	Lyudmila Muravyova (URS)	59.24 m	Karin Illgen (GDR)	58.66 m
Javelin throw	Angéla Németh (HUN)	59.76 m CR	Magda Vidos (HUN)	58.80 m	Valentina Evert (URS)	56.56 m
Pentathlon	Liese Prokop (AUT)	5030 pts CR	Meta Antenen (SUI)	4793 pts	Mariya Sizyakova (URS)	4773 pts

== Medal table ==
Rank	Nation	Gold	Silver	Bronze	Total
1	East Germany (GDR)	11	7	7	25
2	Soviet Union (URS)	9	7	8	24
3	Great Britain (GBR)	6	4	7	17
4	France (FRA)	3	4	0	7
5	Czechoslovakia (TCH)	2	1	2	5
6	Poland (POL)	2	0	5	7
7	Hungary (HUN)	1	2	0	3
8	Switzerland (SUI)	1	1	1	3
9	Italy (ITA)	1	0	3	4
10	Austria (AUT)	1	0	1	2
11	Bulgaria (BUL)	1	0	0	1
12	Finland (FIN)	0	2	0	2
12	Netherlands (NED)	0	2	0	2
12	Romania (ROU)	0	2	0	2
12	Sweden (SWE)	0	2	0	2
16	West Germany (FRG)	0	1	2	3
17	Belgium (BEL)	0	1	0	1
17	Denmark (DEN)	0	1	0	1
17	Ireland (IRL)	0	1	0	1
20	Norway (NOR)	0	0	1	1
20	Yugoslavia (SFR Yugoslavia)	0	0	1	1
Totals (21 entries)		38	38	38	114

== Participation ==
According to an unofficial count, 675 athletes from 30 countries participated in the event, one athlete more than the official number of 674 as published.

- Austria (9)
- Belgium (18)
- Bulgaria (19)
- Czechoslovakia (27)
- Denmark (8)
- East Germany (60)
- Finland (24)
- France (57)
- Gibraltar (1)
- Great Britain (71)
- Greece (24)
- Hungary (32)
- Iceland (3)
- Ireland (4)
- Italy (36)
- Liechtenstein (1)
- Luxembourg (4)
- Malta (1)
- Netherlands (9)
- Norway (18)
- Poland (51)
- Portugal (4)
- Romania (17)
- Soviet Union (79)
- Spain (6)
- Sweden (29)
- Switzerland (19)
- Turkey (10)
- West Germany (16)
- Yugoslavia (18)
