= Athletics at the 1970 Summer Universiade =

Athletics at the VI Summer Universiade
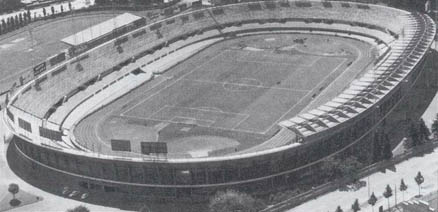
- The host stadium (shown in the 1930s)
- Dates: 2–6 September 1970
- Host city: Turin, Italy
- Venue: Stadio Comunale di Torino
- Events: 33

At the 1970 Summer Universiade, the athletics events were held at the Stadio Comunale in Turin, Italy between 2 and 6 September.

== Medal summary ==
=== Men ===
Event	Gold		Silver		Bronze	
100 metres (wind: 0.0 m/s)	Siegfried Schenke (GDR)	10.5	Jim Green (USA)	10.5	Jean-Louis Ravelomanantsoa (MAD)	10.5
200 metres (wind: 0.0 m/s)	Martin Reynolds (GBR)	21.0	Siegfried Schenke (GDR)	21.0	Jim Green (USA)	21.1
400 metres	Tom Ulan (USA)	45.9	Martin Jellinghaus (FRG)	46.2	Jacques Carette (FRA)	46.3
800 metres	Franz-Josef Kemper (FRG)	1:49.1	Martin Winbolt Lewis (GBR)	1:49.2	Donaldo Arza (PAN)	1:49.5
1500 metres	Francesco Arese (ITA)	3:52.7	John Kirkbride (GBR)	3:52.9	Gianni Del Buono (ITA)	3:53.0
5000 metres	Nikolay Puklakov (URS)	13:56.4	Jens Wollenberg (FRG)	14:00.8	Giuseppe Cindolo (ITA)	14:01.4
10,000 metres	Rashid Sharafetdinov (URS)	29:02.2	Jack Lane (GBR)	29:08.8	Mike Tagg (GBR)	29:22.2
110 metres hurdles	David Hemery (GBR)	13.8	Günther Nickel (FRG)	13.9	Sergio Liani (ITA)	13.9
400 metres hurdles	Larry James (USA)	50.2	Werner Reibert (FRG)	50.4	Dmitriy Stukalov (URS)	50.7
3000 metres steeplechase	Mikhail Zhelev (BUL)	8:32.6	Andy Holden (GBR)	8:36.6	Takaharu Koyama (JPN)	8:38.0
4 × 100 metres relay	Poland (POL); Stanisław Wagner; Jan Werner; Gerard Gramse; Zenon Nowosz	39.2	Cuba (CUB); Bárbaro Bandomo; Juan Morales; Pablo Montes; José Triana	39.2	Soviet Union (URS); Aleksandr Kornelyuk; Vladislav Sapeya; Boris Izmestyev; Valentin Maslakov	39.4
4 × 400 metres relay	United States (USA); Tom Ulan; Roger Colglazier; Tommie Turner; Larry James	3:03.3	Soviet Union (URS); Yevgeniy Borisenko; Yuriy Zorin; Borys Savchuk; Aleksandr Bratchikov	3:04.2	France (FRA); Patrice Viel; Christian Nicolau; Gilles Bertould; Jacques Carette	3:04.4
High jump	Valentin Gavrilov (URS)	2.18	Erminio Azzaro (ITA)	2.15	Șerban Ioan (ROM)	2.15
Pole vault	Wolfgang Nordwig (GDR)	5.46	Christos Papanikolaou (GRE)	5.42	François Tracanelli (FRA)	5.30
Long jump	Alan Lerwill (GBR)	7.91	Arnie Robinson (USA)	7.78	Geoff Hignett (GBR)	7.76
Triple jump	Viktor Saneyev (URS)	17.22	Nikolay Dudkin (URS)	17.00	Jörg Drehmel (GDR)	16.93
Shot put	Hartmut Briesenick (GDR)	19.97	Valeriy Voykin (URS)	19.30	Uwe Grabe (GDR)	19.06
Discus throw	János Murányi (HUN)	60.16	Hein-Direck Neu (FRG)	58.62	Silvano Simeon (ITA)	58.22
Hammer throw	Jochen Sachse (GDR)	72.34	Vasiliy Khmelevskiy (URS)	68.54	Vladimir Ambrosyev (URS)	66.80
Javelin throw	Miklós Németh (HUN)	81.94	József Csík (HUN)	80.32	Zygmunt Jałoszyński (POL)	79.84
Decathlon	Mykola Avilov (URS)	7803	Lennart Hedmark (SWE)	7783	Vladimir Shcherbatykh (URS)	7551

=== Women ===
Event	Gold		Silver		Bronze	
100 metres	Renate Meißner (GDR)	11.5	Wilma van den Berg (NED)	11.6	Györgyi Balogh (HUN)	11.7
200 metres	Renate Meißner (GDR)	22.7	Györgyi Balogh (HUN)	23.2	Wilma van den Berg (NED)	23.5
400 metres	Maria Sykora (AUT)	52.8	Carmen Trustée (CUB)	53.5	Aurelia Pentón (CUB)	53.8
800 metres	Gunhild Hoffmeister (GDR)	2:01.8	Maria Sykora (AUT)	2:01.9	Karin Burneleit (GDR)	2:02.2
100 metres hurdles	Teresa Sukniewicz (POL)	13.0	Bärbel Podeswa (GDR)	13.4	Valeria Bufanu (ROM)	13.5
4 × 100 metres relay	Soviet Union (URS); Lyudmila Zharkowa; Marina Nikiforova; Lyudmila Golomazova; Tatyana Kondrasheva	44.7	Hungary (HUN); Éva Pusztai; Judit Szabóné; Györgyi Balogh; Klára Woth	45.1	West Germany (FRG); Heidi Schuller; Kirsten Roggenkamp; Hannelore Groh; Heide Rosendahl	45.4
High jump	Snežana Hrepevnik (YUG)	1.86	Cornelia Popescu (ROM)	1.83	Ilona Gusenbauer (AUT)	1.83
Long jump	Heide Rosendahl (FRG)	6.84	Elena Vintila (ROM)	6.35	Hiroko Yamashita (JPN)	6.17
Shot put	Nadezhda Chizhova (URS)	19.51	Hannelore Friedel (GDR)	17.84	Ingeburg Friedrich (GDR)	17.03
Discus throw	Karin Illgen (GDR)	62.04	Brigitte Berendonk (FRG)	56.78	Liesel Westermann (FRG)	56.46
Javelin throw	Daniela Jaworska (POL)	56.16	Magda Vidos (HUN)	50.60	Valentina Evert (URS)	50.00
Pentathlon	Tatyana Kondrashova (URS)	4884	Nedyalka Angelova (BUL)	4859	Mieke Sterk (NED)	4828

== Medal table ==
Rank	Nation	Gold	Silver	Bronze	Total
1	Soviet Union (URS)	8	4	5	17
2	East Germany (GDR)	8	3	4	15
3	Great Britain (GBR)	3	4	2	9
4	United States (USA)	3	2	1	6
5	Poland (POL)	3	0	1	4
6	West Germany (FRG)	2	6	2	10
7	Hungary (HUN)	2	4	1	7
8	Italy (ITA)	1	1	4	6
9	Austria (AUT)	1	1	1	3
10	Bulgaria (BUL)	1	1	0	2
11	Yugoslavia (YUG)	1	0	0	1
12	Romania (ROM)	0	2	2	4
13	Cuba (CUB)	0	2	1	3
14	Netherlands (NED)	0	1	2	3
15	Greece (GRE)	0	1	0	1
15	Sweden (SWE)	0	1	0	1
17	France (FRA)	0	0	3	3
18	Japan (JPN)	0	0	2	2
19	Madagascar (MAD)	0	0	1	1
19	Panama (PAN)	0	0	1	1
Totals (20 entries)		33	33	33	99

== See also ==
- FISU World University Games
- University and college sport
