= Athletics at the 1972 Summer Olympics – Men's 200 metres =

Men's 200 metres at the Games of the XX Olympiad
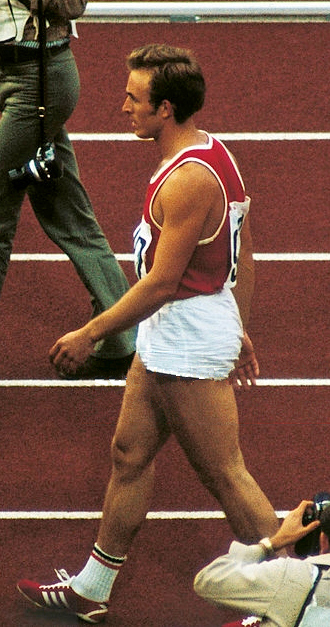
- Valeriy Borzov
- Venue: Olympic Stadium, Munich
- Dates: 3–4 September 1972
- Competitors: 57 from 42 nations
- Winning time: 20.00

Medalists
1st place, gold medalist(s)		Valeriy Borzov; Soviet Union
2nd place, silver medalist(s)		Larry Black; United States
3rd place, bronze medalist(s)		Pietro Mennea; Italy

The men's 200 metres was an event at the 1972 Summer Olympics in Munich. The competition was held on 3–4 September. There were 57 competitors from 42 nations. The maximum number of athletes per nation had been set at 3 since the 1930 Olympic Congress. The event was won by 0.19 seconds by Valeriy Borzov of the Soviet Union, the nation's first medal in the event. Larry Black took silver, extending the United States' podium streak in the men's 200 metres to nine Games. Italy earned its first medal in the event since 1960 with Pietro Mennea's bronze.

== Background ==
This was the 16th appearance of the event, which was not held at the first Olympics in 1896 but has been on the program ever since. One of the eight finalists from the 1968 Games returned: fourth-place finisher (and 1964 bronze medalist) Edwin Roberts of Trinidad and Tobago. Larry Black was the top American and one of the favorites, along with 1971 Pan American Games winner Don Quarrie of Jamaica. European champion Valeriy Borzov of the Soviet Union was also a contender.

Chad, the Republic of the Congo, East Germany, Lesotho, Malawi, Saudi Arabia, and Suriname each made their debut in the event. The United States made its 16th appearance, the only nation to have competed at each edition of the men's 200 metres to date.

== Competition format ==
The competition used the four round format introduced in 1920: heats, quarterfinals, semifinals, and a final. The "fastest loser" system introduced in 1960 was used again in the heats and, for the first time, in the quarterfinals.

There were 9 heats of between 7 and 8 runners each (before withdrawals), with the top 4 men in each advancing to the quarterfinals along with the next 4 fastest overall. The quarterfinals consisted of 5 heats of 8 athletes each; the 3 fastest men in each heat as well as the next fastest runner overall advanced to the semifinals. There were 2 semifinals, each with 8 runners. Again, the top 4 athletes advanced. The final had 8 runners. The races were run on a 400 metre track.

== Records ==
Prior to the competition, the existing world and Olympic records were as follows.

World record	Tommie Smith (USA)	19.83	Mexico City, Mexico	16 October 1968
Olympic record	Tommie Smith (USA)	19.83	Mexico City, Mexico	16 October 1968

No new world or Olympic records were set during the competition.

== Schedule ==
All times are Central European Time (UTC+1)

Date	Time	Round
Sunday, 3 September 1972	11:00; 15:40	Heats; Quarterfinals
Monday, 4 September 1972	15:25; 18:10	Semifinals; Final

== Results ==
=== Heats ===
The top four runners in each of the nine heats and the next fastest four advanced to the quarterfinal round.

==== Heat 1 ====
Rank	Athlete	Nation	Time	Notes
1	Siegfried Schenke	East Germany	20.66	Q
2	Bruno Cherrier	France	20.79	Q
3	Jiří Kynos	Czechoslovakia	20.95	Q
4	Audun Garshol	Norway	21.16	Q
5	Pasqualino Abeti	Italy	21.17	q
6	Solomon Belay	Ethiopia	21.73	
—	Zenon Nowosz	Poland	DNS	

==== Heat 2 ====
Rank	Athlete	Nation	Time	Notes
1	Don Quarrie	Jamaica	21.04	Q
2	Martin Jellinghaus	West Germany	21.10	Q
3	Andrés Calonge	Argentina	21.39	Q
4	Ladislav Kříž	Czechoslovakia	21.58	Q
5	Mike Sands	Bahamas	21.61	q
6	Yeo Kian Chye	Singapore	21.89	
—	Amadou Meïté	Ivory Coast	DNS	
—	Rodolfo Rieder	Paraguay	DNS	

==== Heat 3 ====
Rank	Athlete	Nation	Time	Notes
1	Valeriy Borzov	Soviet Union	20.64	Q
2	Edwin Roberts	Trinidad and Tobago	20.95	Q
3	Richard Hardware	Jamaica	21.09	Q
4	Motsapi Moorosi	Lesotho	21.15	Q
5	Su Wen-Ho	Republic of China	21.55	q
6	Jean-Pierre Bassegela	Republic of the Congo	21.72	
7	Hamad Ndee	Tanzania	21.74	

==== Heat 4 ====
Wind assisted.

Rank	Athlete	Nation	Time	Notes
1	Pietro Mennea	Italy	20.53	Q
2	Markku Juhola	Finland	20.98	Q
3	Ainsley Armstrong	Trinidad and Tobago	21.12	Q
4	Guillermo González	Puerto Rico	21.22	Q
5	Sammy Monsels	Suriname	21.26	q
6	Gaston Malam	Cameroon	21.71	
7	Gary Georges	Haiti	22.97	

==== Heat 5 ====
Rank	Athlete	Nation	Time	Notes
1	Larry Black	United States	20.79	Q
2	René Metz	France	21.08	Q
3	Brian Green	Great Britain	21.26	Q
4	Omar Chokhmane	Morocco	21.29	Q
5	Luiz de Silva	Brazil	21.81	
6	Eston Kaonga	Malawi	22.18	
—	Benedict Majekodumni	Nigeria	DNS	

==== Heat 6 ====
Rank	Athlete	Nation	Time	Notes
1	Chuck Smith	United States	20.79	Q
2	Vladimir Lovetskiy	Soviet Union	20.99	Q
3	Sunil Gunawardene	Ceylon	21.60	Q
4	Trevor James	Trinidad and Tobago	21.83	Q
5	Zainuddin Wahab	Malaysia	21.87	
6	Dominic Saidu	Liberia	22.48	
7	Saad Khalil Al-Dosari	Saudi Arabia	22.56	
—	Jean-Louis Ravelomanantsoa	Madagascar	DNS	

==== Heat 7 ====
Rank	Athlete	Nation	Time	Notes
1	Jaroslav Matoušek	Czechoslovakia	20.70	Q
2	Francisco García	Spain	20.89	Q
3	George Daniels	Ghana	21.05	Q
4	Jimmy Sierra	Colombia	21.10	Q
5	Kevin Johnson	Bahamas	21.70	
6	Ibrahim Saad Abdel Galil	Sudan	22.41	
—	Mao Samphon	Khmer Republic	DNS	
—	Abdulazeez Abdulkareem	Kuwait	DNS	

==== Heat 8 ====
Rank	Athlete	Nation	Time	Notes
1	Manfred Ommer	West Germany	20.80	Q
2	Hans-Joachim Zenk	East Germany	20.93	Q
3	James Addy	Ghana	21.06	Q
4	Dan Amuke	Kenya	21.53	Q
5	Nusrat Iqbal Sahi	Pakistan	22.07	
—	Saleh Alah-Djaba	Chad	DNF	
—	Charlie Francis	Canada	DNS	

==== Heat 9 ====
Rank	Athlete	Nation	Time	Notes
1	Larry Burton	United States	20.80	Q
2	Lucien Sainte-Rose	France	21.09	Q
3	Bevan Smith	New Zealand	21.17	Q
4	Philippe Clerc	Switzerland	21.32	Q
5	Tukal Mokalam	Philippines	21.81	
6	William Dralu	Uganda	21.87	
—	Larmeck Mukonde	Zambia	DNS	

=== Quarterfinals ===
The top three runners (blue) in each of the five heats and the next fastest (green) advanced to the semifinal round.

==== Quarterfinal 1 ====
Rank	Athlete	Nation	Time	Notes
1	Valeriy Borzov	Soviet Union	20.30	Q
2	Manfred Ommer	West Germany	20.53	Q
3	Jiří Kynos	Czechoslovakia	20.68	Q
4	René Metz	France	20.83	
5	Jimmy Sierra	Colombia	20.87	
6	Omar Chokhmane	Morocco	21.00	
7	Guillermo González	Puerto Rico	21.10	
—	Mike Sands	Bahamas	DNS	

==== Quarterfinal 2 ====
Rank	Athlete	Nation	Time	Notes
1	Jaroslav Matoušek	Czechoslovakia	20.65	Q
2	Chuck Smith	United States	20.66	Q
3	Ainsley Armstrong	Trinidad and Tobago	21.00	Q
4	Bevan Smith	New Zealand	21.04	
5	George Daniels	Ghana	21.10	
6	Andrés Calonge	Argentina	21.11	
7	Markku Juhola	Finland	21.19	
8	Sunil Gunawardene	Ceylon	21.31	

==== Quarterfinal 3 ====
Rank	Athlete	Nation	Time	Notes
1	Larry Burton	United States	20.68	Q
2	Martin Jellinghaus	West Germany	20.70	Q
3	Siegfried Schenke	East Germany	20.79	Q
4	Philippe Clerc	Switzerland	20.82	
5	Edwin Roberts	Trinidad and Tobago	20.99	
6	Pasqualino Abeti	Italy	21.00	
7	Ladislav Kříž	Czechoslovakia	21.46	
—	James Addy	Ghana	DSQ	

==== Quarterfinal 4 ====
Rank	Athlete	Nation	Time	Notes
1	Larry Black	United States	20.28	Q
2	Don Quarrie	Jamaica	20.43	Q
3	Bruno Cherrier	France	20.62	Q
4	Vladimir Lovetskiy	Soviet Union	20.83	
5	Motsapi Moorosi	Lesotho	20.90	
6	Su Wen-Ho	Republic of China	21.47	
7	Audun Garshol	Norway	25.30	
—	Dan Amuke	Kenya	DNF	

==== Quarterfinal 5 ====
Rank	Athlete	Nation	Time	Notes
1	Pietro Mennea	Italy	20.47	Q
2	Hans-Joachim Zenk	East Germany	20.59	Q
3	Richard Hardware	Jamaica	20.76	Q
4	Lucien Sainte-Rose	France	20.76	q
5	Francisco García	Spain	20.77	
6	Trevor James	Trinidad and Tobago	21.34	
7	Brian Green	Great Britain	21.41	
—	Samuel Monsels	Suriname	DNS	

=== Semifinals ===
Top four in each heat advance to final.

==== Semifinal 1 ====
Quarrie pulled his hamstring during the race and could not finish.

Rank	Athlete	Nation	Time	Notes
1	Valeriy Borzov	Soviet Union	20.74	Q
2	Larry Burton	United States	20.78	Q
3	Chuck Smith	United States	20.86	Q
4	Siegfried Schenke	East Germany	20.97	Q
5	Jaroslav Matoušek	Czechoslovakia	20.99	
6	Manfred Ommer	West Germany	21.08	
7	Lucien Sainte-Rose	France	21.42	
—	Don Quarrie	Jamaica	DNF	

==== Semifinal 2 ====
Rank	Athlete	Nation	Time	Notes
1	Larry Black	United States	20.36	Q
2	Pietro Mennea	Italy	20.52	Q
3	Hans-Joachim Zenk	East Germany	20.63	Q
4	Martin Jellinghaus	West Germany	20.75	Q
5	Jiří Kynos	Czechoslovakia	20.88	
6	Ainsley Armstrong	Trinidad and Tobago	21.13	
7	Bruno Cherrier	France	21.15	
8	Richard Hardware	Jamaica	21.24	

=== Final ===
Rank	Athlete	Nation	Time
1st place, gold medalist(s)	Valeriy Borzov	Soviet Union	20.00
2nd place, silver medalist(s)	Larry Black	United States	20.19
3rd place, bronze medalist(s)	Pietro Mennea	Italy	20.30
4	Larry Burton	United States	20.37
5	Chuck Smith	United States	20.55
6	Siegfried Schenke	East Germany	20.56
7	Martin Jellinghaus	West Germany	20.65
8	Hans-Joachim Zenk	East Germany	21.05
