= Athletics at the 1972 Summer Olympics – Men's 100 metres =

Men's 100 metres at the Games of the XX Olympiad
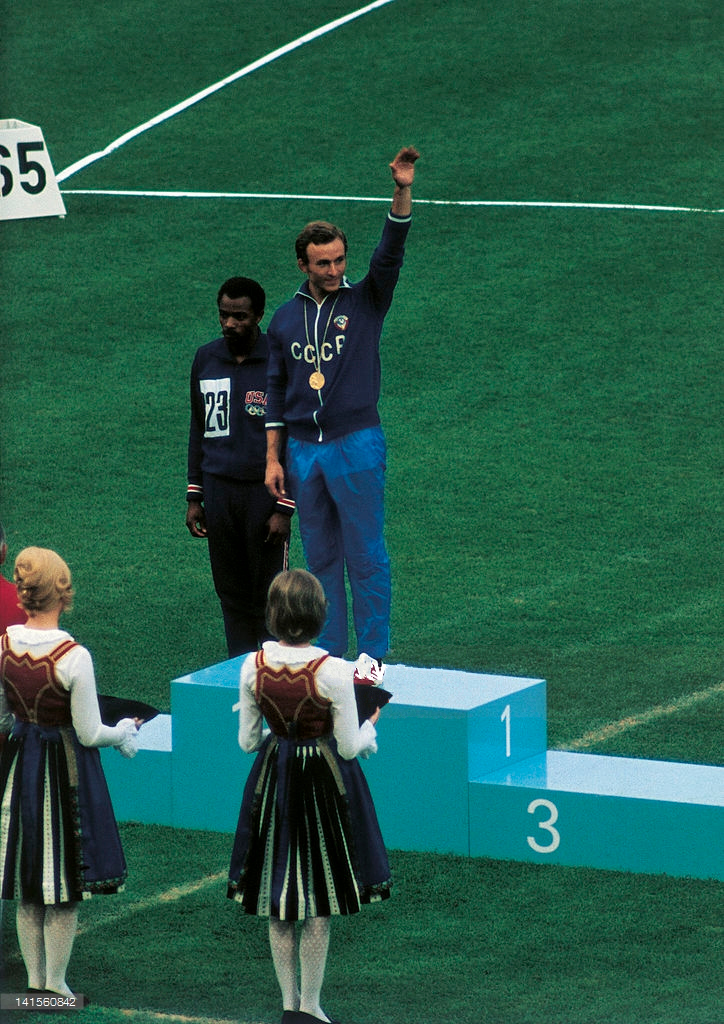
- Valeriy Borzov and Robert Taylor
- Venue: Olympiastadion; Munich, West Germany
- Dates: 31 August (heats, quarterfinals); 1 September 1972 (semifinals, final)
- Competitors: 85 from 55 nations
- Winning time: 10.14 seconds

Medalists
1st place, gold medalist(s)		Valeriy Borzov; Soviet Union
2nd place, silver medalist(s)		Robert Taylor; United States
3rd place, bronze medalist(s)		Lennox Miller; Jamaica

Video on YouTube Official Video Highlights

The men's 100 metres sprint event at the 1972 Olympic Games in Munich, West Germany, was held at Olympiastadion on 31 August and 1 September. Eighty-five athletes from 55 nations competed. Each nation was limited to 3 athletes per rules in force since the 1930 Olympic Congress. The event was won by Valeriy Borzov of the Soviet Union, the first medal in the men's 100 metres for that nation. Jamaican Lennox Miller, silver medalist four years earlier, became the second man to make the podium twice in the event by taking bronze (after Ralph Metcalfe in 1932 and 1936).

This event is notable for the absence of favourites and world record holders Eddie Hart and Rey Robinson from their quarterfinal heats due to American sprint coach Stan Wright being given the wrong starting time. The three qualified American athletes, Robinson, Hart and Robert Taylor, were at the ABC television headquarters watching what they believed were replays of their morning preliminary races before being informed they were watching live coverage of the races they were scheduled to run in. The athletes rushed to the stadium, but Hart and Robinson, scheduled in the first two races, missed their heats, while Robert Taylor hurried to take off his warm up uniform before running his heat. An appeal by American officials to have Robinson and Hart run in another heat was rejected.

== Background ==
This was the seventeenth time the event was held, having appeared at every Olympics since the first in 1896. Two finalists from 1968 returned: Lennox Miller of Jamaica and Jean-Louis Ravelomanantsoa of Madagascar. The favourite was Soviet Valeriy Borzov, the European champion. The American team was missing John Carlos, who had turned to professional football, but still had strong runners in Eddie Hart and Rey Robinson, who had matched the world record of 9.9 seconds in the U.S. Olympic trials, and Robert Taylor.

Thirteen nations appeared in the event for the first time: Bolivia, Cambodia (then Khmer Republic), Chad, Kuwait, Lesotho, Malawi, Mongolia, Paraguay, Saudi Arabia, Sri Lanka, Upper Volta, the Virgin Islands, and Zambia (though Northern Rhodesia had competed previously). The United States was the only nation to have appeared at each of the first seventeen Olympic men's 100 metres events.

== Competition format ==
The event retained the same basic four round format introduced in 1920: heats, quarterfinals, semifinals, and a final. It also expanded the "fastest loser" system, introduced in 1968, to include the quarterfinals as well as the preliminary heats.

The first round consisted of 12 heats, each with 6–8 athletes. The top three runners in each heat advanced, along with the next four fastest runners overall. This made 40 quarterfinalists, who were divided into five heats of 8 runners. The top three runners in each quarterfinal advanced, along with the single fastest fourth-place finisher. The 16 semifinalists competed in two heats of 8, with the top four in each semifinal advancing to the eight-man final.

== Records ==
Prior to the competition, the existing world and Olympic records were as follows.

World record	9.9	(United States) Jim Hines	Sacramento, United States	20 June 1968
World record	9.9	(United States) Ronnie Ray Smith	Sacramento, United States	20 June 1968
World record	9.9	(United States) Charles Greene	Sacramento, United States	20 June 1968
World record	9.9	(United States) Jim Hines	Mexico City, Mexico	14 October 1968
World record	9.9	(United States) Eddie Hart	Eugene, United States	1 July 1972
World record	9.9	(United States) Rey Robinson	Eugene, United States	1 July 1972
Olympic record	9.9	(United States) Jim Hines	Mexico City, Mexico	14 October 1968

No records were set in the event at the 1972 Games.

== Results ==
=== Heats ===
The top three runners in each of the twelve heats, and the next fastest four, advanced to the quarterfinal round.

==== Heat 1 ====
Rank	Athlete	Nation	Time	Notes
1	Lennox Miller	Jamaica	10.45	Q
2	Amadou Meïté	Ivory Coast	10.51	Q
3	Hans-Jürgen Bombach	East Germany	10.66	Q
4	Rudy Reid	Trinidad and Tobago	10.74	
5	Dan Amuke	Kenya	10.76	
6	Byambajavyn Enkhbaatar	Mongolia	10.93	
7	Samphon Mao	Khmer Republic	10.95	
8	Luis Alers	Puerto Rico	11.09	

==== Heat 2 ====
Rank	Athlete	Nation	Time	Notes
1	Valeriy Borzov	Soviet Union	10.47	Q
2	Mike Sands	Bahamas	10.67	Q
3	Luděk Bohman	Czechoslovakia	10.72	Q
4	Gerhard Wucherer	West Germany	10.82	
5	Tadeusz Cuch	Poland	10.89	
6	Yeo Kian Chye	Singapore	10.92	
7	Alphonse Yanghat	Republic of the Congo	10.95	
8	Andrew Sartee	Liberia	11.09	

==== Heat 3 ====
Rank	Athlete	Nation	Time	Notes
1	Manfred Kokot	East Germany	10.49	Q
2	Sandy Osei-Agyemang	Ghana	10.52	Q
3	Les Piggot	Great Britain	10.54	Q
4	John Mwebi	Kenya	10.60	
5	Luís da Silva	Brazil	10.63	
6	Kevin Johnson	Bahamas	10.91	
7	Mansour Al-Juaid	Saudi Arabia	11.23	
–	Robert Arega	Togo	DNS	

==== Heat 4 ====
The tailwind of 2.3 m/s made this heat ineligible for records purposes.

Rank	Athlete	Nation	Time	Notes
1	Jaroslav Matoušek	Czechoslovakia	10.37	Q
2	Brian Green	Great Britain	10.41	Q
3	Kouakou Komenan	Ivory Coast	10.50	Q
4	Walter Callander	Bahamas	10.78	
5	George Calhern	Virgin Islands	10.90	
6	Farhad Navab	Iran	11.02	
7	Angel Guerreros	Paraguay	11.12	
–	Anat Ratanapol	Thailand	DNS	

==== Heat 5 ====
Rank	Athlete	Nation	Time	Notes
1	Aleksandr Kornelyuk	Soviet Union	10.38	Q
2	Kola Abdulai	Nigeria	10.57	Q
3	Stanisław Wagner	Poland	10.62	Q
4	Juraj Demeč	Czechoslovakia	10.66	
5	Félix Mata	Venezuela	10.73	
6	Bjarni Stefánsson	Iceland	10.99	
7	Younis Abdallah	Kuwait	11.20	
–	Gaoussou Koné	Ivory Coast	DNS	

==== Heat 6 ====
Rank	Athlete	Nation	Time	Notes
1	Rey Robinson	United States	10.56	Q
2	Philippe Clerc	Switzerland	10.58	Q
3	Sammy Monsels	Suriname	10.61	Q
4	George Daniels	Ghana	10.65	
5	André Bicaba	Upper Volta	10.71	
6	Motsapi Moorosi	Lesotho	10.74	
7	William Dralu	Uganda	10.92	

==== Heat 7 ====
Rank	Athlete	Nation	Time	Notes
1	Hasely Crawford	Trinidad and Tobago	10.50	Q
2	Don Halliday	Great Britain	10.58	Q
3	Erik Gustafsson	Finland	10.68	Q
4	Guillermo González	Puerto Rico	10.73	
5	Norman Chihota	Tanzania	10.79	
6	Egzi Gebre-Gebre	Ethiopia	10.89	
7	Pierre-Richard Gaetjens	Haiti	11.50	
–	Pablo Montes	Cuba	DNS	

==== Heat 8 ====
The tailwind of 2.10 m/s made this heat ineligible for records purposes.

Rank	Athlete	Nation	Time	Notes
1	Barka Sy	Senegal	10.30	Q
2	Bernd Borth	East Germany	10.48	Q
3	Audun Garshol	Norway	10.49	Q
4	Su Wen-Ho	Republic of China	10.59	q
5	Gana Abba Kimet	Chad	10.89	
6	Raimo Vilén	Finland	11.00	
7	Lionel Caero	Bolivia	11.19	

==== Heat 9 ====
Rank	Athlete	Nation	Time	Notes
1	Alain Sarteur	France	10.42	Q
2	Saleh Alah-Djaba	Chad	10.65	Q
3	Charlie Francis	Canada	10.68	Q
4	Andrés Calonge	Argentina	10.73	
5	Laurie D'Arcy	New Zealand	10.77	
6	Larmeck Mukonde	Zambia	11.16	
–	Hermes Ramírez	Cuba	DNS	

==== Heat 10 ====
Rank	Athlete	Nation	Time	Notes
1	Vasilios Papageorgopoulos	Greece	10.24	Q
2	Jean-Louis Ravelomanantsoa	Madagascar	10.29	Q
3	Michael Fray	Jamaica	10.47	Q
4	Antti Rajamäki	Finland	10.52	q
5	Ainsley Armstrong	Trinidad and Tobago	10.56	q
6	Jorge Vizcarrondo	Puerto Rico	10.79	
7	Zain-ud-Din bin Abdul Wahab	Malaysia	10.80	

==== Heat 11 ====
Rank	Athlete	Nation	Time	Notes
1	Eddie Hart	United States	10.47	Q
2	Dominique Chauvelot	France	10.66	Q
3	Klaus Ehl	West Germany	10.67	Q
4	Benedict Majekodunmi	Nigeria	10.70	
5	Gaston Malam	Cameroon	10.88	
6	Sunil Gunawardene	Ceylon	11.00	
7	Tukal Mokalam	Philippines	11.02	

==== Heat 12 ====
Rank	Athlete	Nation	Time	Notes
1	Robert Taylor	United States	10.32	Q
2	Jobst Hirscht	West Germany	10.36	Q
3	Zenon Nowosz	Poland	10.36	Q
4	Volodymyr Atamas	Soviet Union	10.51	q
5	Axel Nepraunik	Austria	10.61	
6	André Byrame	France	10.64	
7	Moustafa Matola	Malawi	11.31	

=== Quarterfinals ===
The top three runners in each of the five heats and the next fastest one, advanced to the semifinal round.

==== Quarterfinal 1 ====
Hart failed to appear due to a scheduling change and coaching error.

Rank	Athlete	Nation	Time	Notes
1	Jobst Hirscht	West Germany	10.25	Q
2	Jaroslav Matoušek	Czechoslovakia	10.35	Q
3	Bernd Borth	East Germany	10.44	Q
4	Philippe Clerc	Switzerland	10.45	
5	Ainsley Armstrong	Trinidad and Tobago	10.47	
6	Mike Sands	Bahamas	10.50	
7	Audun Garshol	Norway	10.55	
-	Eddie Hart	United States	DNS	

==== Quarterfinal 2 ====
Robinson failed to appear due to a scheduling change and coaching error.

Rank	Athlete	Nation	Time	Notes
1	Jean-Louis Ravelomanantsoa	Madagascar	10.47	Q
2	Brian Green	Great Britain	10.58	Q
3	Kouakou Komenan	Ivory Coast	10.60	Q
4	Stanisław Wagner	Poland	10.61	
5	Sandy Osei-Agyemang	Ghana	10.66	
6	Erik Gustafsson	Finland	10.78	
7	Su Wen-Ho	Republic of China	10.82	
-	Rey Robinson	United States	DNS	

==== Quarterfinal 3 ====
Rank	Athlete	Nation	Time	Notes
1	Valeriy Borzov	Soviet Union	10.07	Q, ER
2	Robert Taylor	United States	10.16	Q
3	Hasely Crawford	Trinidad and Tobago	10.18	Q
4	Zenon Nowosz	Poland	10.40	q
5	Klaus Ehl	West Germany	10.44	
6	Les Piggot	Great Britain	10.53	
7	Dominique Chauvelot	France	10.54	
8	Hans-Jürgen Bombach	East Germany	10.64	

==== Quarterfinal 4 ====
The tailwind of 3.40 m/s made this heat ineligible for records purposes.

Rank	Athlete	Nation	Time	Notes
1	Aleksandr Kornelyuk	Soviet Union	10.23	Q
2	Barka Sy	Senegal	10.27	Q
3	Michael Fray	Jamaica	10.28	Q
4	Kola Abdulai	Nigeria	10.41	
5	Antti Rajamäki	Finland	10.43	
6	Manfred Kokot	East Germany	10.44	
7	Saleh Alah-Djaba	Chad	10.51	
8	Charlie Francis	Canada	10.51	

==== Quarterfinal 5 ====
Rank	Athlete	Nation	Time	Notes
1	Lennox Miller	Jamaica	10.33	Q
2	Alain Sarteur	France	10.40	Q
3	Vasilios Papageorgopoulos	Greece	10.45	Q
4	Amadou Meïté	Ivory Coast	10.52	
5	Luděk Bohman	Czechoslovakia	10.52	
6	Don Halliday	Great Britain	10.60	
7	Sammy Monsels	Suriname	10.64	
8	Vladimir Atamas	Soviet Union	10.83	

=== Semifinals ===
The top four runners in each of the two heats advanced to the final round.

==== Semifinal 1 ====
Papageorgopoulos was forced to scratch after he pulled a groin muscle in the quarter-finals.

Rank	Athlete	Nation	Time	Notes
1	Valeriy Borzov	Soviet Union	10.21	Q
2	Hasely Crawford	Trinidad and Tobago	10.36	Q
3	Jobst Hirscht	West Germany	10.36	Q
4	Michael Fray	Jamaica	10.48	Q
5	Alain Sarteur	France	10.51	
6	Kouakou Komenan	Ivory Coast	10.57	
7	Bernd Borth	East Germany	10.60	
-	Vasilios Papageorgopoulos	Greece	DNS	

==== Semifinal 2 ====
Rank	Athlete	Nation	Time	Notes
1	Robert Taylor	United States	10.30	Q
2	Lennox Miller	Jamaica	10.31	Q
3	Aleksandr Kornelyuk	Soviet Union	10.35	Q
4	Zenon Nowosz	Poland	10.42	Q
5	Barka Sy	Senegal	10.42	
6	Jean-Louis Ravelomanantsoa	Madagascar	10.46	
7	Jaroslav Matoušek	Czechoslovakia	10.51	
8	Brian Green	Great Britain	10.52	

=== Final ===
Borzov "won fairly easily."

Rank	Lane	Athlete	Nation	Time
1st place, gold medalist(s)	2	Valeriy Borzov	Soviet Union	10.14
2nd place, silver medalist(s)	4	Robert Taylor	United States	10.24
3rd place, bronze medalist(s)	5	Lennox Miller	Jamaica	10.33
4	6	Aleksandr Kornelyuk	Soviet Union	10.36
5	8	Michael Fray	Jamaica	10.40
6	7	Jobst Hirscht	West Germany	10.40
7	1	Zenon Nowosz	Poland	10.46
–	3	Hasely Crawford	Trinidad and Tobago	DNF

- Wind speed = 0.3 m/s (0.67 mph)
