= 1972 United States Olympic trials (track and field) =

1972 United States Olympic track and field trials
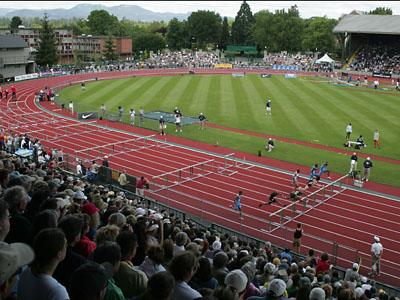
- Hayward Field years later
- Dates: June 29 – July 9, 1972
- Host city: Eugene, Oregon, U.S.
- Venue: Hayward Field
- Level: Senior
- Type: Outdoor

OU library Video on YouTube Video on YouTube Wottle WR @10:00, Seagren WR @ 12:20

The men's 1972 United States Olympic trials for track and field were held from June 29 to July 9 at Hayward Field in Eugene, Oregon, organized by the Amateur Athletic Union (AAU). These were the first trials with no preliminary events; athletes merely had to meet the qualification standard in their event. This was also the last time the women's Olympic trials were held separately, and the ten-day competition in Eugene was held over eleven days.

The women's trials were held separately over two days (July 7–8) in Frederick, Maryland, under less elegant conditions at Governor Thomas Johnson High School. There were no wind readings taken during the events that normally require them; while photo-finish equipment was available in Eugene to separate close finishes, it was not available when needed in Frederick. As a consequence, the women's 100 meter race had to declare a tie for second place and was only able to assess one hand time for the winner. Willye White, who qualified for her fifth Olympics at this meet, later complained that "We did poorly at the Olympics because of poor conditions; lack of meets, lack of qualified coaches, and lack of fairness. For example, the nationals and Olympic trials were conducted on tracks that were not superior, and the team was not in Munich early enough to adjust to the climate and time changes."

The pentathlon took place in New Mexico at Los Alamos on June 23 and 24 and allowed two Canadian athletes to participate. The Canadian athletes finished in the first two positions but did not displace the selection of the American team.

== Men's results ==
Key: ≠ Athlete without "A" standard, not selected.

=== Men track events ===
Event	Gold		Silver		Bronze	
100 meters Wind +0.9	Eddie Hart	9.9 =WR	Rey Robinson	9.9 =WR	Robert Taylor	10.0
200 meters Wind -0.5	Chuck Smith	20.4	Larry Burton	20.5	Larry Black	20.6
400 meters	Wayne Collett	44.1	John Smith	44.3	Vince Matthews	44.9
800 meters	Dave Wottle	1:44.3 =WR	Rick Wohlhuter	1:45.0	Ken Swenson	1:45.1
1500 meters	Jim Ryun	3:41.5	Dave Wottle	3:42.3	Bob Wheeler	3:42.4
5000 meters	Steve Prefontaine	13:22.8 NR	George Young	13:29.4	Len Hilton	13.40.2
10,000 meters	Frank Shorter	28:35.6	Jeff Galloway	28:48.8	Jon Anderson	29:08.2
110 m hurdles Wind +2.1	Thomas Hill	13.5w	Willie Davenport	13.5w	Rod Milburn	13.6w
400 m hurdles	Ralph Mann	48.4 NR	Dick Bruggeman	48.6	Jim Seymour	49.3
3000 m s'chase	Mike Manley	8.29.8	Doug Brown	8.31.8	Steve Savage	8.32.0
20K racewalk	Larry Young	1:35:56.4	Goetz Klopfer	1:37:53.4	Tom Dooley	1:38:03
50K racewalk	Larry Young	4:13:04.4 NR	Bill Weigle	4:20:09.4	Steve Hayden	4:23:22.6
Marathon	Kenny Moore	2:15:57.8	Frank Shorter	2:15:57.8	Jack Bacheler	2:20:29.2

=== Men field events ===
Event	Gold		Silver		Bronze	
High jump	Dwight Stones	2.21 m (7 ft 3 in)	Ronnie Jourdan	2.21 m (7 ft 3 in)	Chris Dunn	2.21 m (7 ft 3 in)
Pole vault	Bob Seagren	5.63 m (18 ft 5 1/2 in) WR	Steve Smith	5.50 m (18 ft 1/2 in)	Jan Johnson	5.50 m (18 ft 1/2 in)
Long jump	Arnie Robinson	8.04 m (26 ft 4 1/2 in)w +1.0	Randy Williams	8.02 m (26 ft 3 1/2 in)w +0.1	Preston Carrington	8.02 m (26 ft 3 1/2 in)w +0.8
Triple jump	John Craft	17.12 m (56 ft 2 in)w +2.4	Dave Smith	17.07 m (56 ft 0 in) +0.3 NR	Art Walker	16.79 m (55 ft 1 in)w +2.6
Shot put	George Woods	21.37 m (70 ft 1 1/4 in)	Al Feuerbach	20.99 m (68 ft 10 1/4 in)	Brian Oldfield	20.69 m (67 ft 10 1/2 in)
Discus throw	Jay Silvester	64.36 m (211 ft 1 in)	John Powell	62.74 m (205 ft 10 in)	Tim Vollmer	61.56 m (201 ft 11 in)
Hammer throw	Tom Gage	70.08 m (229 ft 11 in)	Al Schoterman	68.70 m (225 ft 4 in)	George Frenn	68.46 m (224 ft 7 in)
Javelin throw	Bill Schmidt	82.46 m (270 ft 6 in)	Milt Sonsky	81.66 m (267 ft 10 in)	Fred Luke	81.62 m (267 ft 9 in)
Decathlon	Jeff Bannister	8120	Jeff Bennett	8076	Bruce Jenner	7846

==== Notes ====
^{a}

== Women's results ==
=== Women track events ===
Event	Gold		Silver		Bronze	
100 meters Wind NWI	Barbara Ferrell	11.3	Iris Davis; Mattline Render	NT; NT		
200 meters Wind NWI	Jackie Thompson	23.4	Barbara Ferrell	23.4	Pam Greene	23.7
400 meters	Kathy Hammond	51.8 NR	Debra Edwards	53.3	Mable Fergerson	53.3
800 meters	Madeline Manning-Jackson	2:05.2	Cheryl Toussaint	2:05.7	Carol Hudson	2:06.0
1500 meters	Francie Larrieu	4:10.4 NR	Francie Johnson	4:15.2	Doris Brown	4:18.5
100 m hurdles Wind NWI	Patty Johnson	13.0 NR	Lacy O'Neal	13.3	Mamie Rallins	13.4

=== Women field events ===
Event	Gold		Silver		Bronze	
High jump	Deanne Wilson	1.76 m (5 ft 9 1/4 in)	Sandi Goldsberry	1.76 m (5 ft 9 1/4 in)	Cindy Gilbert	1.71 m (5 ft 7 1/4 in)
Long jump	Martha Watson	6.14 m (20 ft 1 1/2 in)	Willye White	6.13 m (20 ft 1 1/4 in)	Kim Attlesey	5.88 m (19 ft 3 1/4 in)
Shot put	Maren Seidler	16.28 m (53 ft 4 3/4 in)	Lynn Graham	15.30 m (50 ft 2 1/4 in)	Mary Jacobson	14.87 m (48 ft 9 1/4 in)
Discus throw	Olga Connolly	51.92 m (170 ft 4 in)	Vivian Turner	48.80 m (160 ft 1 in)	Denise Wood	45.41 m (148 ft 11 in)
Javelin throw	Kate Schmidt	60.28 m (197 ft 9 in)	Sherry Calvert	54.40 m (178 ft 5 in)	Roberta Brown	52.00 m (170 ft 7 in)
Pentathlon	Jennifer Meldrum Canada; Jane Frederick	4251; 4169	Penny May Canada; Marilyn King	4202; 4064	Gale Fitzgerald	4034
