= Byambajavyn Enkhbaatar =

Mongolian sprinter (born 1950)

Personal information
- Nationality: Mongolian
- Born: 18 December 1950 (age 75)

Sport
- Sport: Sprinting
- Event: 100 metres

Byambajavyn Enkhbaatar (born 18 December 1950) is a Mongolian sprinter. He competed in the men's 100 metres at the 1972 Summer Olympics.
