= Sunil Gunawardene =

Sri Lankan sprinter (born 1949)

Personal information
- Nationality: Sri Lankan
- Born: 6 October 1949 (age 77)

Sport
- Sport: Sprinting
- Event: 100 metres

Sunil B. Gunawardene (born 6 October 1949) is a Sri Lankan former sprinter. He competed in the men's 100 metres and 200 metres at the 1972 Summer Olympics.
