= Farhad Navab =

Iranian sprinter

Personal information
- Nationality: Iranian
- Born: 1 July 1956 (age 70)

Sport
- Sport: Sprinting
- Event: 100 metres

Farhad Navab (Persian: فرهاد نواب, born 1 July 1956) is an Iranian sprinter. He competed in the men's 100 metres at the 1972 Summer Olympics.
