= Kouakou Komenan =

Ivorian sprinter

Personal information
- Nationality: Ivorian
- Born: 1942 (age 83–84)

Sport
- Sport: Sprinting
- Event: 100 metres

Kouakou Komenan (born 1942) is an Ivorian sprinter. He competed in the men's 100 metres at the 1972 Summer Olympics.
