= Robert Taylor (sprinter, born 1948) =

American sprint athlete

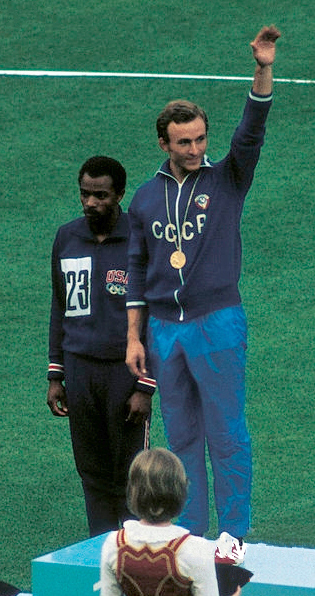
- Taylor (left) at the 1972 Olympics

Personal information
- Born: September 14, 1948 Tyler, Texas, U.S.
- Died: November 13, 2007 (aged 59) Houston, Texas, U.S.
- Height: 183 cm (6 ft 0 in)
- Weight: 80 kg (176 lb)

Sport
- Sport: Athletics
- Event: Sprint
- Club: TSU Tigers, Houston

Achievements and titles
- Personal bests: 100 yd – 9.2 (1969); 100 m – 10.16 (1972); 220 yd – 20.8 (1970)
Medal record
Representing the United States
Olympic Games
Gold medal – first place	1972 Munich	4 × 100 m relay
Silver medal – second place	1972 Munich	100 m

Robert Taylor (September 14, 1948 – November 13, 2007) was an American sprinter. He became Olympic champion in the 4 × 100 m relay at the 1972 Olympics and placed second in the 100 m final. He is the father of former NFL player Bobby Taylor.

== Career ==
Taylor won the AAU championships in the 100-meter dash in 1972.

At the Munich Olympics, Taylor was second in the 100 m. On the way to the final, Taylor was unwittingly a participant in the first athletics controversy of his career. Unlike his teammates Eddie Hart and Rey Robinson, Taylor was narrowly able to reach the start of his quarter-final race, when their coach Stan Wright unknowingly used an outdated Olympic schedule and failed to deliver his athletes to the track in time. As Taylor told it in a 2000 interview with the Tyler Morning Telegraph, the three athletes and Wright had left the Olympic village for their quarter-final runs. Whilst waiting for the bus to transport them, they wandered into the ABC-TV headquarters where they saw to their utter horror the athletes lining-up for the first heat, Robinson's heat. A frantic dash to the stadium ensued in a car driven by the ABC-TV employee Bill Norris. Both Robinson and Hart, who was scheduled to run in heat 2, were too late. Taylor, who was scheduled to run in heat 3, only had time to rip-off his sweats, put on his running shoes, and do a couple of knee bends before running.

Taylor also ran the second leg for the American 4 × 100 m relay team, which became Olympic champion and equaled the United States' own world record of 38.19.

== World rankings ==
Taylor was voted by the experts at Track and Field News to be ranked among the best in the US and the world in the 100 meters sprint event from 1969 to 1972.

100 meters
Year	World rank	US rank
1969	10th	5th
1970	–	6th
1971	–	–
1972	2nd	1st

== Personal life ==
Taylor's image from the 1972 Olympics was a central piece of Olympic footage integrated into the music video for Manfred Mann's Earth Band's 1984 version of Runner.

Taylor graduated from Emmett J. Scott High School in Tyler, Texas in 1968. He then attended Texas Southern University and graduated with a degree in education. After graduation, Taylor worked as a teacher, first at Hogg Middle School in Tyler, and then moved to Houston to teach physical education at Lucian L. Lockhart Elementary in Third Ward, and later special education and physical education at Lovett Elementary in the Meyerland area. He died from a heart attack in Houston at the age of 59. At the time of his death, he was teaching in Missouri City, Texas.

== Awards ==
As well as participating at an Olympics, which Taylor has said was "the highlight" of his athletics career, Taylor was a respected family man, athlete and teacher. He received the following accolades:

- All-Southwestern Athletic Conference and NAIA All-American.
- Inducted in 1973 into the Outstanding College Athletes Hall of Fame.
- In 1996, inducted into the Texas Southern University Hall of Fame.
- Inducted in 2007 into the Prairie View Interscholastic League Coaches Hall of Fame.
- Southwestern Conference Hall of Fame.
