= Lionel Caero =

Bolivian sprinter

Personal information
- Nationality: Bolivian
- Born: 7 February 1951
- Died: 6 November 2014 (aged 63)

Sport
- Sport: Sprinting
- Event: 100 metres

Lionel Caero (7 February 1951 – 6 November 2014) was a Bolivian sprinter. He competed in the men's 100 metres at the 1972 Summer Olympics.
