= Erik Gustafsson (sprinter) =

Finnish sprinter

Personal information
- Nationality: Finnish
- Born: 24 September 1943 (age 82)

Sport
- Sport: Sprinting
- Event: 100 metres

Erik Gustafsson (born 24 September 1943) is a Finnish sprinter. He competed in the men's 100 metres at the 1972 Summer Olympics.
