= Markku Juhola =

Finnish sprinter

Personal information
- Nationality: Finnish
- Born: 2 November 1947 (age 78)

Sport
- Sport: Sprinting
- Event: 200 metres

Markku Juhola (born 2 November 1947) is a Finnish sprinter. He competed in the men's 200 metres at the 1972 Summer Olympics.
