= Manfred Ommer =

German sprinter (1950–2021)

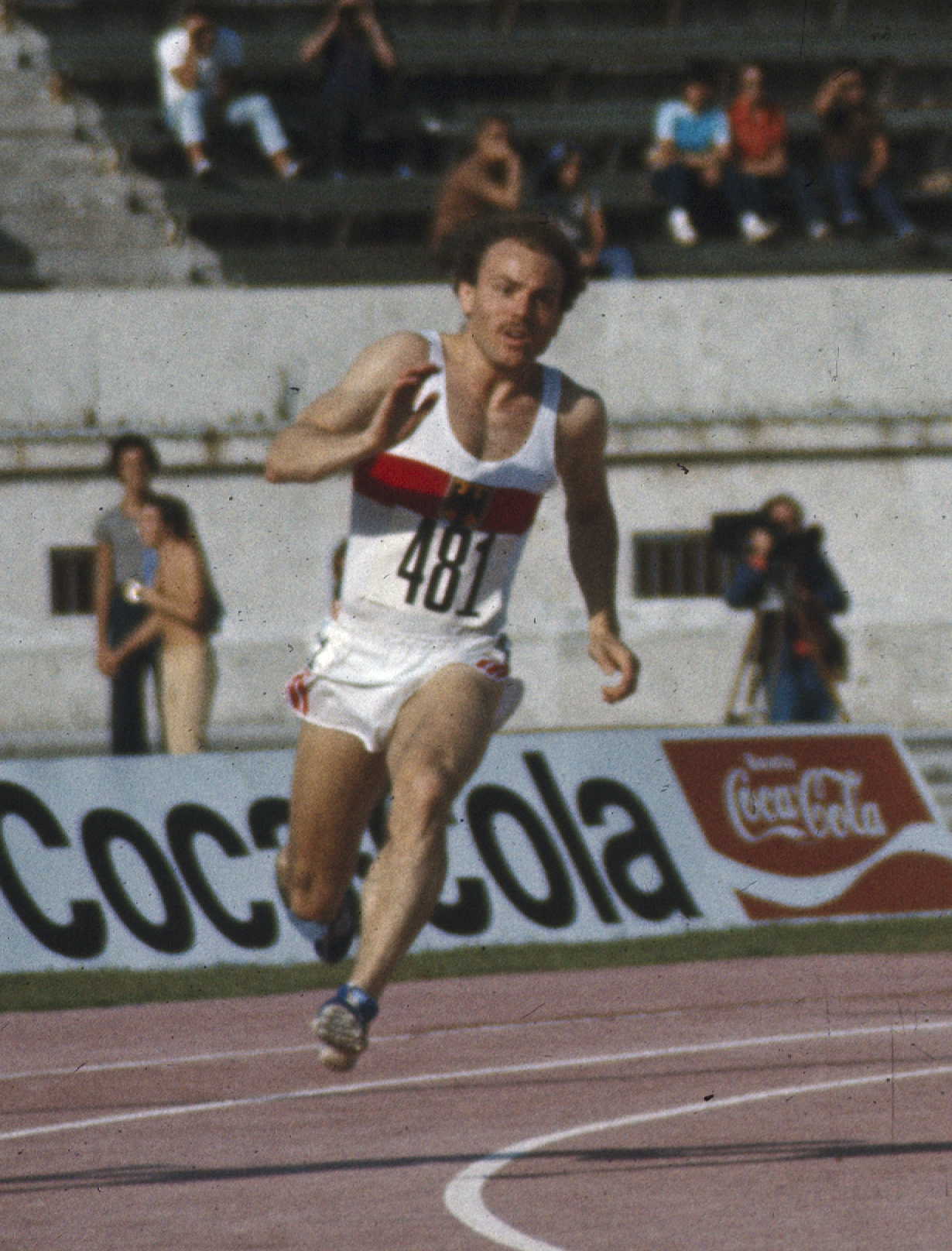
- Manfred Ommer competing at the 1974 European Athletics Championships in Rome

Personal information
- Nationality: German
- Born: 13 September 1950 Bergisch Gladbach, West Germany
- Died: 21 May 2021 (aged 70)

Sport
- Sport: Sprinting
- Event: 200 metres
Medal record
Men's athletics
Representing West Germany
European Championships
Silver medal – second place	1974 Rome	200 m

Manfred Ommer (13 September 1950 – 21 May 2021) was a German sprinter. He competed in the men's 200 metres at the 1972 Summer Olympics representing West Germany.

== Life ==
At the 1971 European Athletics Championships, he was eliminated with the 4 × 100 metres relay in the final (loss of baton). In 1972 he became German champion over 100 and 200 meters. At the 1972 Summer Olympics in Munich he retired in the 200 metres run in the semifinals. Ommer - a member of the relay - was the only German athlete who did not compete after the Munich massacre at the 1972 Summer Olympics in Munich. In 1974 he was German champion over 100 and 200 meters again. His greatest success is the silver medal with 20.76s in the 200 metres run at the 1974 European Athletics Championships. In the 100 metres run he was in 10.36s sixth, the relay was disqualified. In 1977 he confessed to doping with Dianabol. In the newly emerging doping discussion in 2013 after submission of the final report of the anti-doping commission, he accused the Freiburg physician Armin Klümper: Klümper was the largest doper on this planet.

Manfred Ommer belonged to the sports club Bayer 04 Leverkusen. In his active time he was 1.77 m tall and weighed 71 kg.

From 1986 until March 8, 1994, Ommer was president of the German soccer club FC 08 Homburg in Homburg, Saarland. Ommer led this into the Bundesliga and made headlines in 1987 when he signed the condom manufacturer London as the main sponsor for the club. The DFB banned advertising on the jersey, imposed a fine and threatened Homburg with a point deduction.

In 1988, Ommer was active in investment consulting with 17 of his own companies after dropping out of his law degree after seven semesters.

Ommer also caused a stir with the so-called "Ommer model". The business idea behind this was to collect money in various funds in order to buy players, which would be passed on to clubs for a kind of leasing fee. Some of the players financed in this way ended up in Homburg. The model has often been viewed as a "slave trade". At Rot-Weiss Essen, Ommer was a member of the board of directors. Ommer suffered from Parkinson's disease as he aged and died on 21 May 2021 at the age of 70.
