= Solomon Belaye =

Ethiopian sprinter

Personal information
- Nationality: Ethiopian
- Born: 17 July 1947 (age 78)

Sport
- Sport: Sprinting
- Event: 200 metres

Solomon Belay (born 17 July 1947) is an Ethiopian sprinter. He competed in the men's 200 metres at the 1972 Summer Olympics.
