= Bob Wheeler =

Personal information
- Born: Robert Tomlinson Wheeler III; January 11, 1952 Timonium, Maryland, U.S.
- Died: November 2010 (aged 58) La Jolla, California, U.S.

Sport
- Country: United States of America
- Sport: Track & field
- Event(s): mile, 1500 m
- College team: Duke University

Achievements and titles
- Olympic finals: Semifinals, 1972
- Regional finals: ACC champion, mile (1971, 1973)
- National finals: NCAA champion, 1,000 yards (1971)

Robert Tomlinson Wheeler III (January 11, 1952 – November 2010) was an American athlete in track & field who specialized in the mile. Born in Timonium, Maryland, he went to Dulaney High School in Baltimore County, Maryland, and attended Duke University. He represented the United States at the 1972 Summer Olympics in Munich, where he ran the 1500 metres. He is still the Duke record holder at the mile (indoor), the 1500 metres (outdoor), and the 1000 metres (indoor), records he ran between 1971 and 1973.

== College career ==
Wheeler attended Duke between 1971 and 1973. He won the 1,000-yard run at the 1971 NCAA Indoor Championships (his 2:07.4 was an NCAA championship record until 1976) and was ACC Champion in the mile in 1971 and 1973, with winning times of 4:05.9 and 4:03.2. He won ACC titles in cross country and indoor and outdoor track. In 1971, he won the 1000 metres event at the Millrose Games, the oldest athletics invitational in the United States, and at least until 2004 was the only Duke athlete to win at the Millrose Games.

Wheeler is still the fastest miler in Duke history, having run 3:39.00 on the 1500 metres outdoor in 1972. His indoor record of 4:00.70, which he set in 1973, is a full second faster than the second-best Duke time, 4:02.06, run by Ryan McDermott in 2011.

He also holds the Duke record at 1000 metres indoor at 2:22.20 (1971) and the record in the 4x mile relay at 16:22.34 (1973), and has the second-best time at the 800 metres outdoor at 1:47.70 (1972). In 2002 he was voted, as one of 50, into the ACC's 50th anniversary team for indoor track and field. In November 2010, he died in Mountain View, California, at the age of 58.

== 1972 Olympic appearance ==
Qualifiers for the 1500 metres race at the Olympics were held at the 1972 United States Olympic Trials (track and field) in Eugene, Oregon. On the first day in Oregon, Wheeler impressed with the best time, 3:42.7, though favorite Jim Ryun went on to win the title.

Before the actual Olympics started, there was considerable controversy over the proposed participation of Southern Rhodesia; in the weeks before the Olympics, a number of African countries (including Kenya, home of later 1500 metres Gold medal winner Kip Keino) threatened to withdraw from the event. The American track and field delegation composed a statement asking the International Olympic Committee to reconsider their decision to invite the former British colony; Wheeler spoke out in support of the African athletes who threatened to withdraw: "Everyone is in sympathy with this situation. It's going to be a matter of individual conscience what each is going to do."

In Munich, Wheeler reached the semifinals in the 1500 metres, a competition which proved disastrous for the American delegation after Jim Ryun, one of America's best milers ever, fell during qualifications. Like Dave Wottle, the other remaining American, Wheeler failed to make it through his heat; it was the first time since 1956, and only the second time ever, that the 1500 final was run without an American in it.
