= Motsapi Moorosi =

Lesotho sprinter (1945–2013)

Personal information
- Born: 4 May 1945 Springs, Union of South Africa
- Died: 8 February 2013 (aged 67) Maseru, Lesotho
- Height: 5 ft 4 in (163 cm)
- Weight: 140 lb (64 kg)

Sport
- Sport: Sprinting
- Event: 100 metres

Motsapi Moorosi (4 May 1945 – 8 February 2013) was a Mosotho sprinter. He was the first person to compete for Lesotho at the Summer Olympics, competing in the men's 100 metres and 200 metres at the 1972 Summer Olympics. He later served as a coach.

== Biography ==
Moorosi was born on 4 May 1945 in Springs, South Africa, to a Basotho family. His parents, from Lesotho worked as laborers in South Africa. In South Africa, Moorosi worked as a welfare officer at a gold mine in Orange Free State. He held residency rights in Lesotho due to his family and owned a Lesotho passport, and eventually he moved there in 1971. After moving, he began working for the Lesotho National Development Corporation while also serving as a coach to local athletes.

Moorosi was a top sprinter and the fastest in Southern Africa at the time. CNN later described him as "A humble young man with an easy smile and a ready laugh," as well as his name being "synonymous with speed". He ran his personal best time of 10.2 seconds in the 100 metres twice. Around 1971, he toured Europe and won five of six competitions he entered in. That year, he expressed hopes of competing at the 1972 Summer Olympics in Munich, but South Africa was not allowed to take part due to their apartheid policies, while Lesotho's National Olympic Committee had not yet been recognized. Eventually, at the start of 1972, Lesotho's Olympic Committee was recognized, and they sent Moorosi as their lone athlete at the 1972 Olympics. He thus became Lesotho's first Olympian and served as the country's flag bearer at the opening ceremony. Moorosi was also the first black Olympian from Southern Africa in 68 years. At the Olympics, he competed in the men's 100 metres, failing to advance in his heat with a time of 10.74, and the men's 200 metres, where he reached the quarterfinals, but advanced no further with a time of 20.9. A picture of him competing alongside Su Wen-ho, Edwin Roberts and Valeriy Borzov was included on the Voyager Golden Record that was sent in space to represent life on Earth to any extraterrestrial life that may find it.

Moorosi worked as a sports trainer at the President Brand Gold Mine and served as an athletics coach following his Olympic appearance, coaching Lesotho teams at the All-African Games and the Commonwealth Games. He also helped develop athletics in his country for the Lesotho Sports Council in the Ministry of Education. Moorosi ran workshops and coaching clinics and also founded a sports shop and a boys' football tournament. He died on 8 February 2013 in Maseru, Lesotho, from cancer, at the age of 67.
