= Saleh Alah-Djaba =

Chadian sprinter

Saleh Alah-Djaba (born January 5, 1950) is a track and field sprint athlete who competes internationally for Chad

Alah-Djaba represented Chad at the 1972 Summer Olympics in Munich. He competed in the 100 metres and in his heat he finished 2nd thus qualifying for the next round, he ran the next round in 10.51 seconds but came 7th so didn't reach the semi-finals, he also entered the 200 metres but didn't finish his heat.
