= Omar Chokhmane =

Moroccan sprinter

Omar Chokhman
Personal information
- Nationality: Moroccan
- Born: 14 June 1948 (age 78)

Sport
- Sport: Sprinting
- Event: 200 metres

Omar Chokhman (born 14 June 1948) is a Moroccan sprinter. He competed in the men's 200 metres at the 1972 Summer Olympics.
