= André Byrame =

French sprinter (born 1943)

André Byrame (10 November 1943 – April 2025) was a French athlete who specialised in the 100 metres. Born in Goyave, Guadeloupe, Byrame competed at the 1972 Summer Olympics for France.
