= Stan Wright (track coach) =

US track and field coach (1921–1998)

Stan Wright

Stanley Vandorne Wright (August 11, 1921 – November 6, 1998) was the first African-American head coach of a United States track and field team. A noted college and national track coach and administrator over a forty-year period, he coached many Olympians and world record holders, for which, in 1993, he was rewarded with membership in the USA National Track and Field Hall of Fame. He achieved notoriety in 1972 as the man held responsible for the two American favourites for the 100 meters title, Eddie Hart and Rey Robinson, missing their quarter-final races. He was later exonerated in an official report to the United States Olympic Committee.

== College coaching career ==
Born August 11, 1921 in Englewood, New Jersey, Wright graduated from Springfield College in Massachusetts in 1949.

Wright was a track coach for 26 years at Texas Southern University, acting as Head Track Coach between 1950 and 1967. Here he coached four Olympians, including the winner of the 100 meters at the 1968 Olympics, Jim Hines. Jim Hines, from Oakland, California had deliberately chosen to study at Texas Southern because it had the best track and field team in the country.

He was later head track coach at Western Illinois University, between 1967 and 1969, and California State University, Sacramento, between 1969 and 1979. He acted as Athletics Director for Sacramento State from 1975 to 1979 and Fairleigh Dickinson University between 1979 and 1985.

== National coaching career ==
In 1966, he was appointed head coach for the USA track and field teams for dual athletics meets against Poland and the USSR that occurred a week apart in Los Angeles. This is notable because he was the first Black American to be awarded this honour

In 1968 and 1972, he was the Assistant Sprints Coach for the United States Olympic Team.

Wright took on many senior administrative roles within sport: he was a member of the United States Olympic Committee and took financial roles with The Athletics Congress (the predecessor of United States Track and Field organisation).

In recognition of his years as a highly respected coach and administrator, he received the accolade in 1993 of becoming an inductee into the United States Track and Field Hall of Fame.

== 1972 controversy ==
On the morning of August 31, 1972, all three American representatives – Eddie Hart, Rey Robinson and Robert Taylor – in the 100 meters at the 1972 Munich Olympics qualified for the quarter-final round to be held later that day.

Walking through the Olympic Village at 4:17 pm, Hart saw 100 meters races being shown on a TV monitor in the ABC-TV studios. It soon became shockingly clear that these were live images of the quarter-finals that the 3 athletes were meant to run in, and that his name had 'N/A' – Not Available – against it. A mad dash to the Olympic Stadium in an ABC-TV car resulted in two of three, Hart and Robinson, arriving too late for their quarter-finals, and the third, Taylor, arriving only seconds before his, so enabling him to run, but totally unprepared. An appeal by the United States team failed and the eliminations of Hart and Robinson stood.

Valeriy Borzov went on to win the Olympic 100 meters title with Taylor second. It remains a subject of intense debate as to how the result would have been affected if Hart and Robinson had run in the final. They held the two fastest times that year going into the Olympics and finished first and second at the Olympic Trials, ahead of Taylor.

The 4 × 100 meters sprint relay team coached by Wright (with Hart on the final leg) later would win the gold medal, but it was a "bittersweet ending" to the Olympics for all concerned.

Wright claimed he was given an old schedule that showed the quarter-finals as not starting before 7 pm, and had had this fact confirmed by Olympic officials. Track and Field News had published the correct schedule in its Olympic preview issue. An investigation for the United States Olympic Committee later cleared Wright, but not before much opprobrium was heaped on him. The report lays the blame on the late amendment to the schedule by the International Amateur Athletics Federation (IAAF) not being conveyed effectively to the responsible coaches. That it was a more general misunderstanding is given credence by the fact that Borzov later admitted that he nearly missed his quarter-final, and that Lee Evans, a fellow American athlete, who was in the stadium and who had realised what was happening with the schedule, sprinted back to the Olympic Village in a desperate attempt to try to warn the three sprinters of the impending calamity.

John Smith (American athlete in 1972 and later UCLA Assistant Coach) has stated that it meant for Wright that 'his career was never the same after that". and that "if everybody is going to blast Stan, well, the whole staff should apologize to the whole team for not making sure Stan knew the right time."

Wright was made to feel the scapegoat, particularly after a television interview with Howard Cosell on ABC television after the Olympics that many felt, including Wright, was more an excoriation and less an interview. Wright has been quoted as stating ”In the interview, I took the responsibility, but not as an admission of incompetence or negligence on my part. I took the responsibility to get the athletes off the hook because it wasn’t their responsibility and they didn’t act irresponsibly.”.

Wright nearly did not make the trip to Munich. He is reported as having been upset at being overlooked by the AAU as the head coach for the track and field team, and so no longer wanted to be a part of the Olympics coaching team. (Bill Bowerman of the University of Oregon was appointed instead.) However, when he was assured he would be a shoo-in as head coach in 1976, he did agree to be the sprint coach in 1972.

== Personal life ==
Wright served in the United States Army Air Forces from November 1945 to January 1947. On leaving, he trained first as a coach at Springfield College, then earned a master's degree in education at Teachers College, Columbia University. On graduation, Wright could not find work in the north of the United States so had to move south for a coaching job.

After retirement, he remained active despite a stroke and multiple heart by-pass surgery. He died in Harris, Texas on November 6, 1998 following a long illness, two days after the death of his cousin, Larry Ellis, who had been head coach of the 1984 United States Olympic Team and the former president of USA Track and Field Organisation.

== Bibliography ==
- Duncanson, Neil (2011), The Fastest Men on Earth, Andre Deutsch, ISBN 0233003363.
- Wright, George, 'Stan Wright – Track Coach: Forty Years in the "Good Old Boy Network" – The Story of an African-American Pioneer', Pacifica Sports Research Publications, 2005.
