= Dan Amuke =

Kenyan sprinter

Personal information
- Nationality: Kenyan
- Born: 5 November 1949

Sport
- Sport: Sprinting
- Event: 100 metres

Daniel Amuke (born 5 November 1949) was a Kenyan sprinter. He competed in the men's 100 metres at the 1972 Summer Olympics.
