= Tukal Mokalam =

Filipino sprinter

Personal information
- Nationality: Filipino
- Born: June 15, 1949
- Died: March 1, 1975 (aged 25) Manila, Philippines

Sport
- Sport: Sprinting
- Event: 100 metres

Tukal Mokalam (June 15, 1949 – March 1, 1975) was a Filipino sprinter. He competed in the men's 100 metres at the 1972 Summer Olympics.
