= Chuck Smith (sprinter) =

American former sprinter (born 1949)

Chuck Smith (born March 12, 1949) is an American former sprinter, born in Chicago, who competed in the 1972 Summer Olympics. Running in the 200 meters, he finished fifth in the final. He won the 200 meters race at the 1972 U.S. Olympic Team Trials. He attended Occidental College and won both the 100 meter and 200 meter NCAA College Division races in his first year of competitive running.
