= Larmeck Mukonde =

Zambian sprinter

Personal information
- Nationality: Zambian
- Born: 1 April 1945 (age 81)

Sport
- Sport: Sprinting
- Event: 100 metres

Larmeck Mukonde (born 1 April 1945) is a Zambian sprinter. He competed in the men's 100 metres at the 1972 Summer Olympics.
