= Ainsley Armstrong =

Trinidad and Tobago sprinter

Personal information
- Born: 27 December 1952 (age 73) Arima, Trinidad and Tobago

Sport
- Sport: Sprinting
- Event: 100 metres

Ainsley Edward Armstrong (born 27 December 1952) is a Trinidad and Tobago sprinter. He competed in the 100 metres at the 1972 Summer Olympics and the 1976 Summer Olympics.

Armstrong competed for the Texas Southern Tigers track and field team in the NCAA.

Armstrong married Debra Edwards-Armstrong. His son Aaron Armstrong was an Olympic gold medallist sprinter.
