= Su Wen-ho =

Taiwanese sprinter (born 1945)

Personal information
- Nationality: Taiwanese
- Born: 蘇文和, Pinyin: Sū Wén-hé; 10 December 1945 (age 80)

Sport
- Sport: Sprinting
- Event: 100 metres
Medal record
Men's athletics
Representing Taiwan
Asian Championships
Silver medal – second place	1973 Marikina	200 m
Silver medal – second place	1973 Marikina	Long jump

Su Wen-ho (born 10 December 1945) is a Taiwanese sprinter. He competed in the 100 metres at the 1968 Summer Olympics and the 1972 Summer Olympics.

The picture, featuring Su Wen-ho, Motsapi Moorosi, Valeriy Borzov and Edwin Roberts in the 200 m heats at the 1972 Summer Olympics was selected for the Voyager Golden Record and later launched into space aboard two Voyager spacecraft in 1977.
