= Larry Burton =

American football player and sprinter (born 1951)

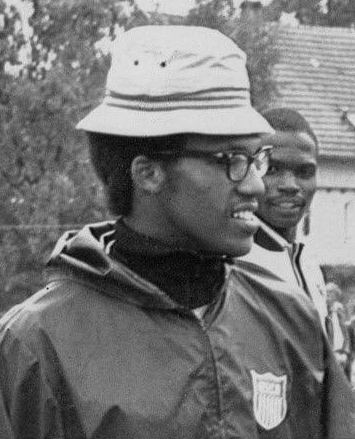

No. 80, 87
- Position: Wide receiver

Personal information
- Born: December 15, 1951 (age 74); Northampton County, Virginia, U.S.
- Listed height: 6 ft 2 in (1.88 m)
- Listed weight: 192 lb (87 kg)

Career information
- College: Purdue
- NFL draft: 1975: 1st round, 7th overall pick

Career history
- New Orleans Saints (1975–1977); San Diego Chargers (1978–1979)

Awards and highlights
- First-team All-American (1974); First-team All-Big Ten (1974)

Career NFL statistics
- Receptions: 44
- Receiving yards: 804
- Touchdowns: 7
- Stats at Pro Football Reference

Larry Burton
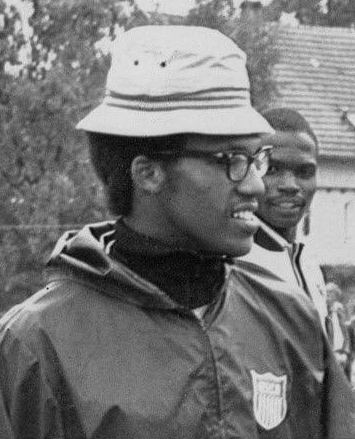
- Burton at the 1972 Olympics

Personal information
- Height: 6 ft 2 in (188 cm)
- Weight: 190 lb (86 kg)

Sport
- Sport: Athletics
- Event: Sprint
- Club: Purdue Boilermakers

Achievements and titles
- Personal bests: 60 yd - 5.9 (1972); 100 yd – 9.3 (1974); 100 m – 10.2 (1972); 200 m – 20.37 (1972)

Lawrence Godfrey Burton (born December 15, 1951) is an American former professional football player and world-class Olympic sprinter, finishing fourth for the United States team in the 200 meter final at the 1972 Summer Olympic Games. He held the world record in the 60-yard dash at 5.9 seconds.

As a Senior at Purdue University, he finished his season with 38 catches for 702 yards (18.5 YPR) and 4 TD. He led the Big 10 in catches, receiving yards, and was 2nd in yards per reception. He was named to numerous All-American teams.

Burton was selected by the New Orleans Saints in the first round (7th overall) of the 1975 NFL draft; a wide receiver from Purdue University, he played in the NFL for five seasons for the Saints and the San Diego Chargers between 1975 and 1979. Despite having over 250 receiving yards in each of his first two seasons, he was never able to become a regular starter for any team.

== Boys Town career ==
In 1980, Larry, along with his wife Ida, became Family Teachers at Boys Town located outside of Omaha, Nebraska.

In 1992, after being Family Teachers, Larry became the Director of the Long Beach Shelter, where he worked until 2008.

Larry said, "Many of the youth who come to our Long Beach Shelter are in crisis upon arrival. This is a safety net for them. Otherwise, their lives would be endangered for this is an emergency place."

The Burtons earned the Civic Leader Award, given by the National Academy of Sports and Athletics.

== Personal life ==
In 2013, Burton was inducted into the Virginia Sports Hall of Fame.

He has 3 children, and Burton's grandsons, Clay and Trey, played football for the Florida Gators. Trey was a tight end for the Indianapolis Colts, and also played for the Philadelphia Eagles, and the Chicago Bears.
