= Rey Robinson =

American sprinter

Personal information
- Full name: Reynaud Syverne Robinson
- Born: April 1, 1952 (age 74) Fort Meade, Florida, U.S.
- Education: Florida A&M
- Height: 6 ft 0 in (183 cm)
- Weight: 146 lb (66 kg)

Sport
- Country: United States
- Sport: Track and field
- Event: 100m dash, 200m

Achievements and titles
- Olympic finals: 1972 quarterfinal heat
- Personal bests: 100 m – 9.9 (1972); 220 yd – 20.8 (1974)

Reynaud Syverne "Rey" Robinson (born April 1, 1952) is a former American athlete, one of the world's top sprinters in the early 1970s.

At age twenty on July 1, 1972, Robinson finished second to Eddie Hart in the 100 meters at the Olympic Trials in Eugene, Oregon, equalling the world record at 9.9 seconds. Both were favorites at the 1972 Summer Olympics in Munich, West Germany, held two months later.

However, they were eliminated in the 100 m race because their coach, Stan Wright, unknowingly using an outdated Olympic schedule to determine the starting time of their quarterfinal heat, failed to deliver them to the track on time. This failure due to disorganization created much controversy. Though still bitter at what occurred, Robinson declared he did not blame Wright for what happened.

Robinson continued in the sport as head track coach at Florida A&M University (2001–2009), coaching multiple Olympic medalist Walter Dix.
