= Eddie Hart (sprinter) =

American sprinter (born 1949)

Personal information
- Full name: Edward James Hart
- Born: April 24, 1949 (age 77) Martinez, California, U.S.
Medal record
Men's athletics
Representing the United States
Olympic Games
Gold medal – first place	1972 Munich	4 × 100 m relay

Edward James "Eddie" Hart (born April 24, 1949) is an American former track and field sprinter and Olympic champion in the men's 4 × 100 m relay race at the 1972 Summer Olympics.

Born in Martinez, California, Hart won the 1970 NCAA University Division Outdoor Track and Field Championships over 100 yards as a University of California, Berkeley student. He also won the 4 × 110 yards relay title, but was later disqualified after his teammate Isaac Curtis was controversially found to be academically ineligible.

At the US Olympic Trials in 1972, both Hart and Rey Robinson repeated the world record, running the 100 m in 9.9 seconds, and were favored to win the race at the Olympic Games. But in Munich, they were both eliminated in the 100 m race because their coach, Stan Wright, unknowingly using an outdated Olympic schedule to determine the starting time of their quarterfinal heat, failed to deliver them to the track on time. This failure due to disorganization created much controversy. Hart also ran the anchoring leg in the American 4 × 100 m relay team, which won a gold medal and equalled the United States' own world record of 38.19.

Hart continued to run and in 1989 set the Masters world record in the 100 m that lasted for 14 years.

In 2017 Hart released a book, Disqualified: Eddie Hart, Munich 1972, and the Voices of the Most Tragic Olympics about his Olympic experience.
