= 1972 Summer Olympics =

Multi-sport event in Munich, West Germany

Games of the XX Olympiad
- Emblem of the 1972 Summer Olympics
- Location: Munich, West Germany
- Motto: The Cheerful Games (German: Heitere Spiele)
- Nations: 121
- Athletes: 7,134 (6,075 men, 1,059 women)
- Events: 195 in 21 sports (28 disciplines)
- Opening: 26 August 1972
- Closing: 11 September 1972 (Note: Originally scheduled for 10 September, the date was reset to the following day by the organizers due to a suspension caused by the Munich massacre.)
- Opened by: President Gustav Heinemann
- Closed by: IOC president Avery Brundage
- Cauldron: Günther Zahn
- Stadium: Olympiastadion

The 1972 Summer Olympics (German: Olympische Sommerspiele 1972), officially known as the Games of the XX Olympiad (German: Spiele der XX. Olympiade) and officially branded as Munich 1972 (German: München 1972; Bavarian: Minga 1972), were an international multi-sport event held in Munich, West Germany, from 26 August to 11 September 1972. It was the second Summer Olympics to be held in Germany, after the 1936 Games in Berlin, which had taken place under the Nazi rule. Germany became only the second country at that point after the United States to have two different cities host the Summer Olympics.

The West German government had been eager to have the Munich Olympics present a democratic and optimistic Germany to the world, as shown by the Games' official motto, "Die Heiteren Spiele", or "the cheerful Games". The logo of the Games was a blue solar logo (the "Bright Sun") by Otl Aicher, the designer and director of the visual conception commission. The hostesses wore sky-blue dirndls as a promotion of Bavarian cultural heritage. The Olympic mascot, the dachshund "Waldi", was the first officially named Olympic mascot. The Olympic Fanfare was composed by Herbert Rehbein. The Soviet Union won the most gold and overall medals.

The Olympic Park (Olympiapark) was based on Frei Otto's plans and became a Munich landmark after the Games. The competition sites, designed by architect Günther Behnisch, included the Olympic swimming hall, the Olympics Hall (Olympiahalle, a multipurpose facility) and the Olympic Stadium (Olympiastadion), and an Olympic village very close to the park. The design of these stadia was considered revolutionary, with sweeping canopies of acrylic glass stabilized by metal ropes, used on such a large scale for the first time.

The event was overshadowed by the Munich massacre in the second week, in which 11 Israeli athletes and coaches and a West German police officer at the Olympic Village were killed by the Palestinian militant organisation Black September.

== Host city selection ==
1972 Summer Olympics bidding results
City	Country	Round	
City	Country	1	2
Munich	West Germany	29	31
Madrid	(Francoist Spain) Spain	16	16
Montréal	Canada	6	13
Detroit	United States	6	

Munich won its Olympic bid on 26 April 1966, at the 64th IOC Session in Rome, Italy, over bids presented by Detroit, Madrid, and Montréal. Montréal would eventually host the following Olympic Games in 1976. Within Spain, Barcelona had prepared a project more developed than Madrid, but the decisive meeting was held on Christmas Eve, 1965 in Madrid and the Barcelona members of the Spanish Olympic Committee were told that no matter of importance would be dealt with so they did not meet. Thus, the SOC presented the Madrid bid. Other bids, including one from the two cities that expressed interest alongside Paris, submitted a letter to the IOC to make an official bid, but it ultimately did not materialize.

== Munich massacre ==
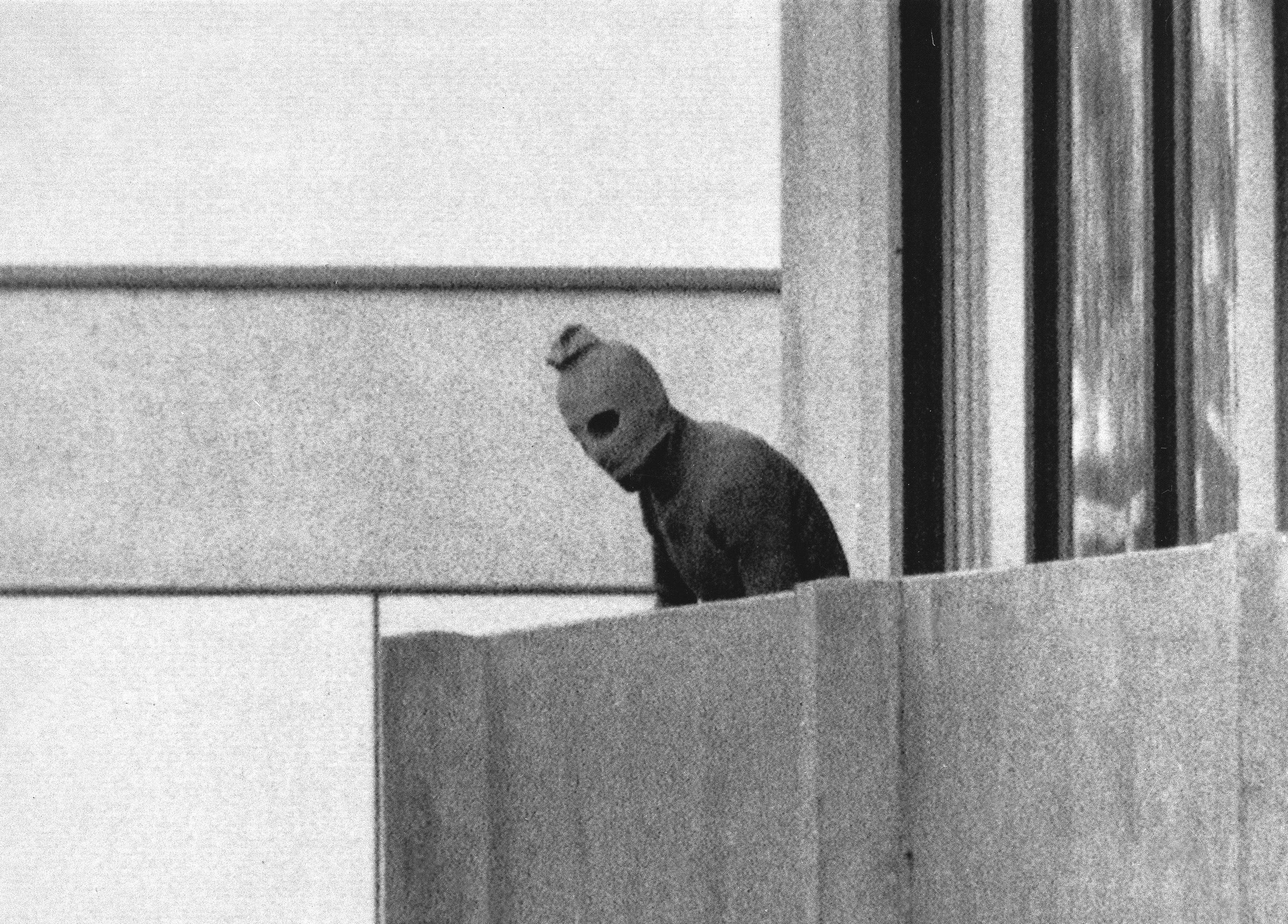
One of the most reproduced photos taken during the siege shows a kidnapper on the balcony attached to Munich Olympic village Building 31, where members of the Israeli Olympic team and delegation were held.

The Games were largely overshadowed by what has come to be known as the "Munich massacre". Just before dawn on 5 September, a group of eight members of the Palestinian Black September militant organization broke into the Olympic Village and took eleven Israeli athletes, coaches and officials hostage in their apartments. Two of the hostages who resisted were killed in the first moments of the break-in; the subsequent standoff in the Olympic Village lasted for almost 18 hours.

Late in the evening of 5 September that same day, the terrorists and their nine remaining hostages were transferred by helicopter to the military airport of Fürstenfeldbruck, ostensibly to board a plane bound for an undetermined Arab country. The German authorities planned to ambush them there, but underestimated the numbers of their opposition and were thus undermanned. During a botched rescue attempt, all of the Israeli hostages were killed. Four of them were shot, then incinerated when one of the terrorists detonated a grenade inside the helicopter in which the hostages were sitting. The five remaining hostages were then shot and killed with a machine gun.

"Our worst fears have been realized tonight. They have now said that there were 11 hostages. Two were killed in their rooms, yesterday morning. Nine were killed at the airport, tonight. They're all gone."

— After a series of conflicting reports and rumours, Jim McKay of ABC brought the news at 3:24 a.m. local time.

All but three of the terrorists were killed as well. Although arrested and imprisoned pending trial, they were released by the West German government on 29 October 1972, in exchange for the hijacked Lufthansa Flight 615. Two of those three were supposedly hunted down and assassinated later by the Mossad. Jamal Al-Gashey, who is believed to be the sole survivor, is still living today in hiding in an unspecified African country with his wife and two children. The Olympic events were suspended several hours after the initial attack for the first time in the modern Olympic Games history, but once the incident was concluded, Avery Brundage, the International Olympic Committee president, declared that "the Games must go on". A memorial ceremony was then held in the Olympic stadium, and the competitions resumed after a stoppage of 34 hours. Due to the suspension, the Games that were originally to close on 10 September were rescheduled to 11 September. The attack prompted heightened security at subsequent Olympics beginning with the 1976 Winter Olympics.

The massacre led the German federal government to re-examine its anti-terrorism policies, which at the time were dominated by a pacifist approach imposed after World War II. This led to the creation of the elite counter-terrorist unit GSG 9, similar to the British SAS. It also led Israel to launch the Mossad assassinations following the Munich massacre, in which those suspected of involvement were systematically tracked down and assassinated.

The events of the Munich massacre were chronicled in the Oscar-winning documentary, One Day in September. An account of the aftermath is also dramatized in three films: the 1976 made-for-TV movie 21 Hours at Munich, the 1986 made-for-TV movie Sword of Gideon, Steven Spielberg's 2005 film Munich. In her film 1972, Artist Sarah Morris interviews Georg Sieber, a former police psychiatrist who advised the Olympics' security team, about the events and aftermath of Black September. A historical drama thriller centered around the television coverage of the massacre, September 5, was released in 2024.

== Highlights ==
Sweeping canopies of acrylic glass stabilized by metal ropes

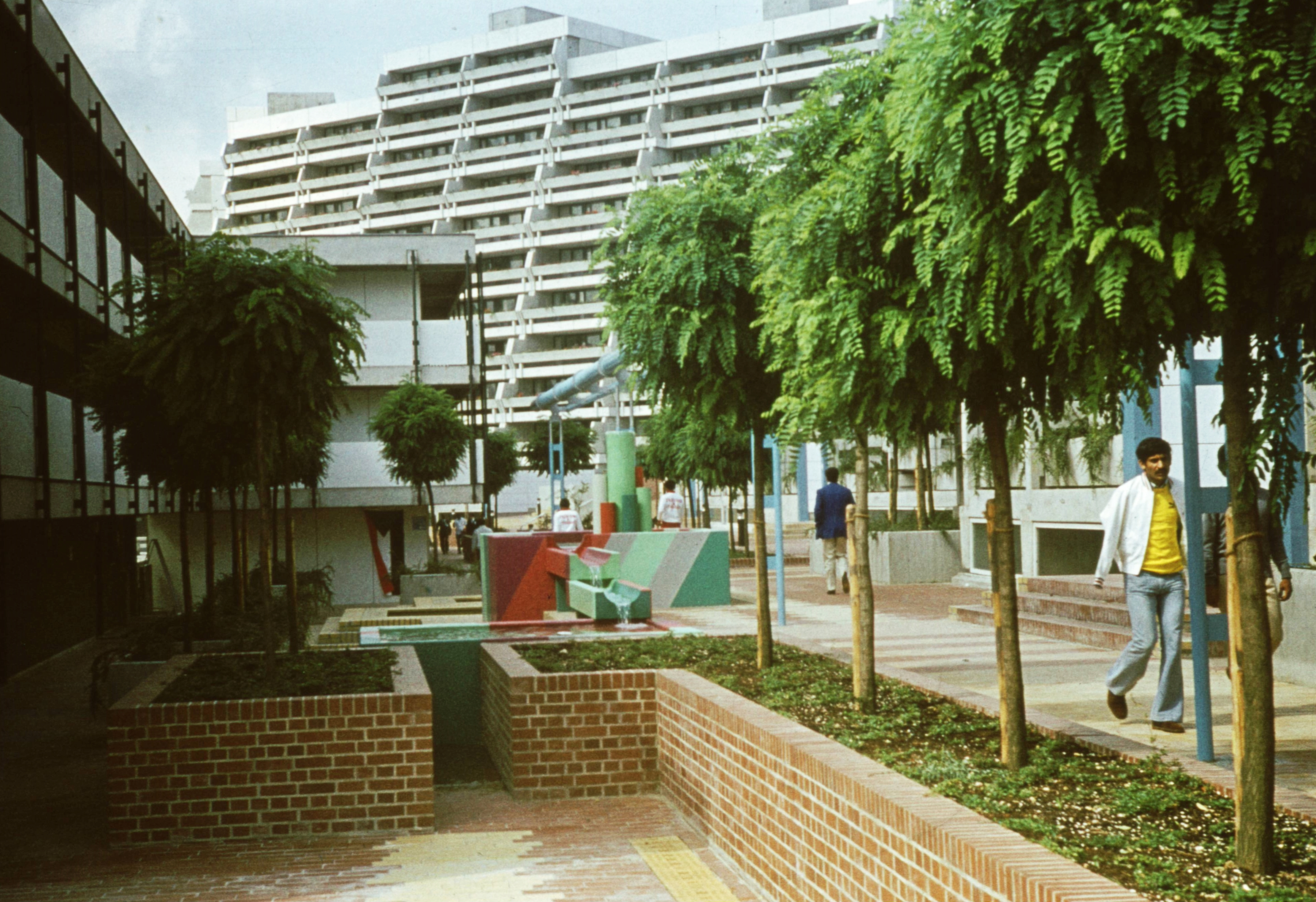
Olympic village

Sweeping canopies

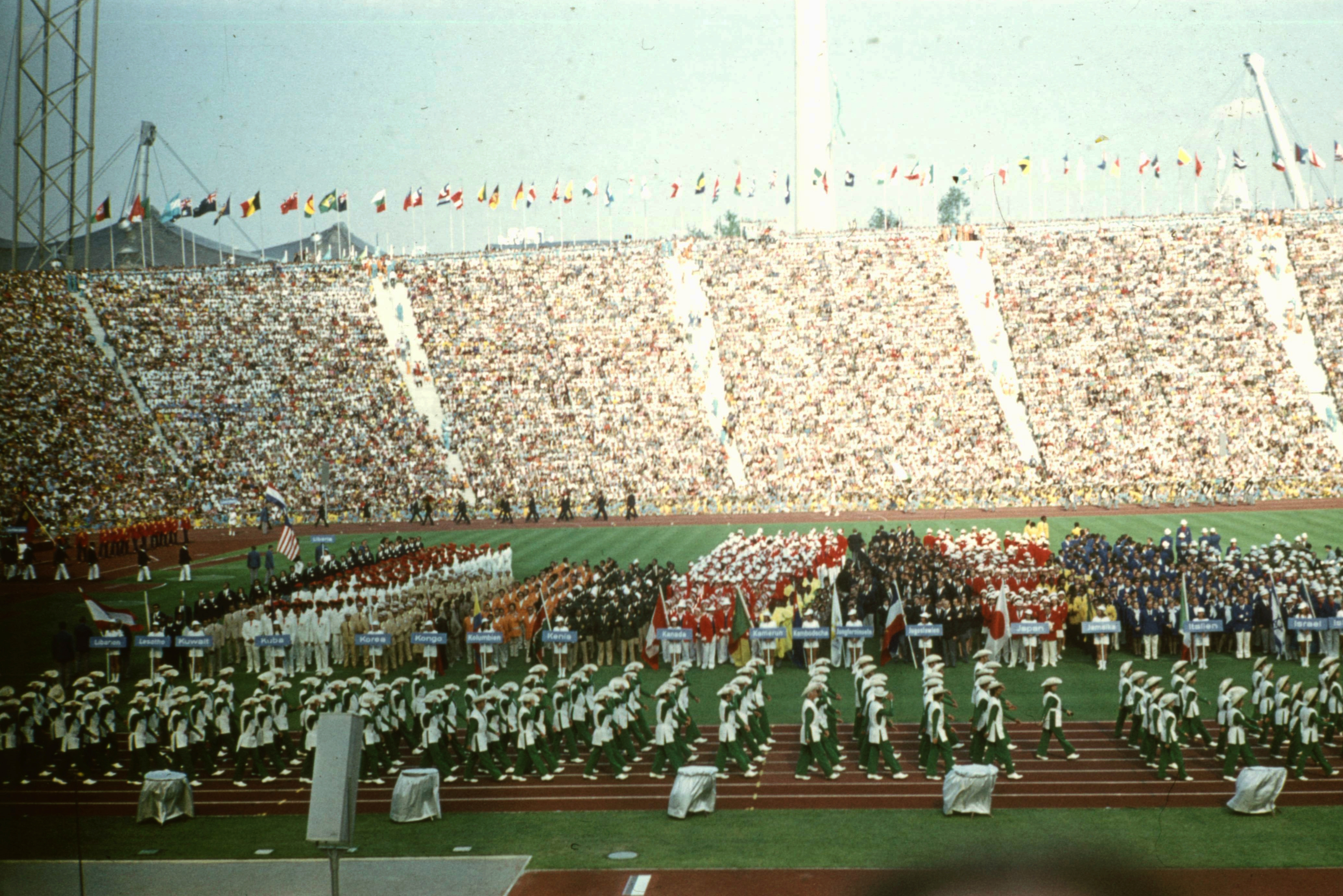
Procession of athletes in the Olympic Stadium in Munich

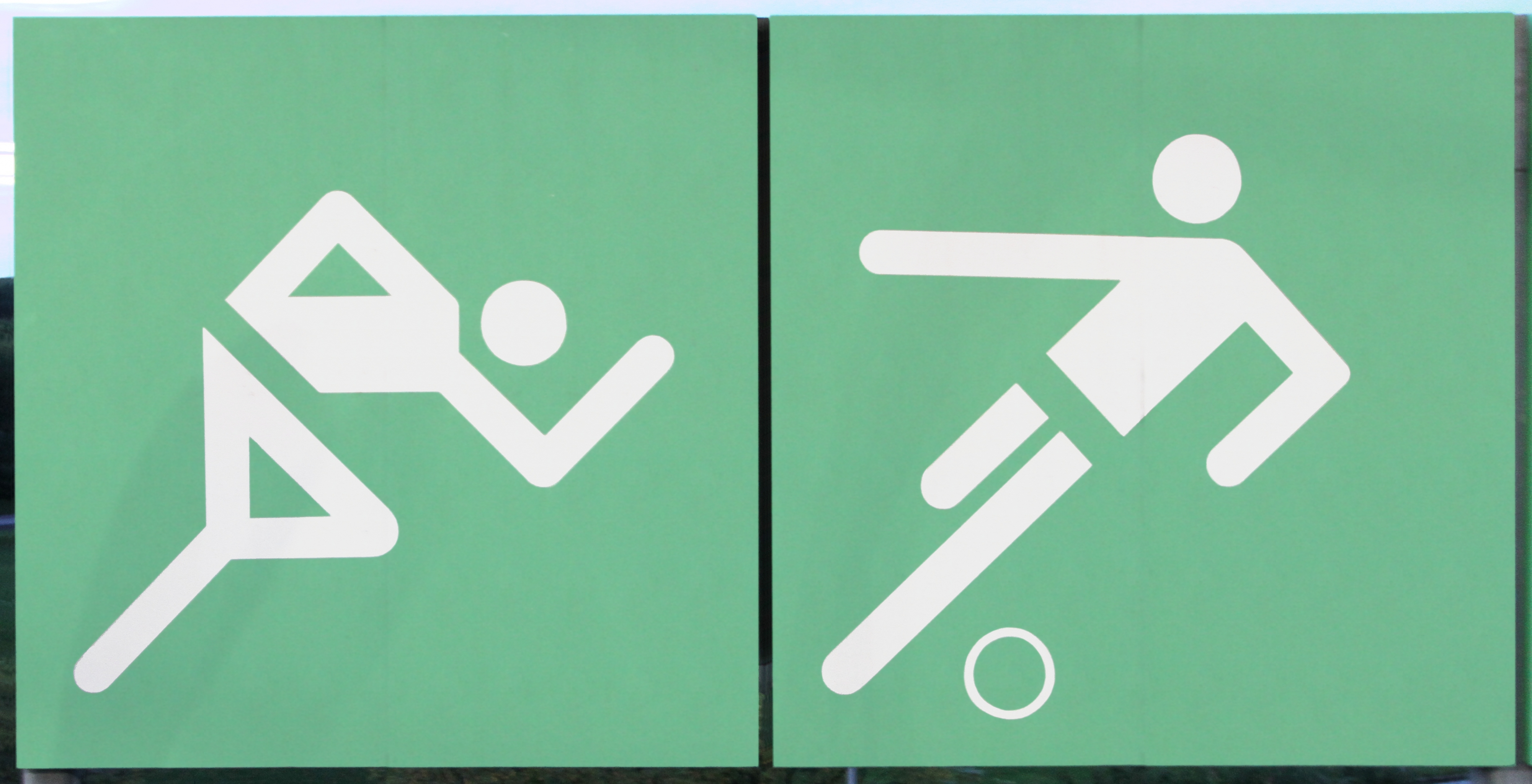
Otl Aicher's signage pictograms designed for the Munich Olympic Games

- These were the final Olympic Games under the IOC presidency of Avery Brundage.
- American Mark Spitz set a world record when he won seven gold medals (while on the way to setting a new world record for each of his seven gold medals) in a single Olympics, bringing his lifetime total to nine (he had won two golds in Mexico City's Games four years earlier). Being Jewish, Spitz was asked to leave Munich before the closing ceremonies for his own protection, after fears arose that he would be an additional target of those responsible for the Munich massacre. Spitz's record stood until 2008, when it was beaten by Michael Phelps who won eight gold medals in the pool.
- Olga Korbut, a Soviet gymnast, became a media star after winning a gold medal in the team competition event, failing to win in the individual all-around after a fall (she was beaten by teammate Lyudmilla Turischeva), and finally winning two gold medals in the balance beam and the floor exercise events.
- In the final of the men's basketball, the United States lost to the Soviet Union in what is widely considered as the most controversial game in international basketball history. In a close-fought match, the U.S. team appeared to have won by a score of 50–49. However, the final three seconds of the game were replayed three times by judges until the Soviet team came out on top and claimed a 51–50 victory. Ultimately the U.S. team refused to accept their silver medals, which are believed to be held in a vault in Lausanne, Switzerland. It has come to light since that five of the medals are missing and believed to be in the hands of a German Olympic official with Nazi ties.
- Lasse Virén of Finland won the 5,000 and 10,000 m (the latter after a fall), a feat he repeated in the 1976 Summer Olympics.
- Valeriy Borzov of the Soviet Union won both the 100 m and 200 m in track and field.
- The 100 metres event was notable for the absence of favorites and world record holders Eddie Hart and Rey Robinson for their quarterfinal heats. American sprint coach Stan Wright, had been given the wrong starting time. All three qualified American athletes were at the ABC television headquarters watching what they thought were replays of their morning preliminary races. In fact, they were watching live coverage of the races they should have been in. Hart and Robinson, scheduled in the first two races, missed their heats. The athletes rushed to the stadium, with Robert Taylor hurrying to take off his warm up uniform before running the later heat.
- Two American 400 m runners, Vincent Matthews (gold medalist) and Wayne Collett (silver medalist), staged a protest on the victory podium, talking to each other and failing to stand at attention during the medal ceremony. They were banned by the IOC, as Tommie Smith and John Carlos had been in the 1968 Summer Olympics. Since John Smith had pulled a hamstring in the final and had been ruled unfit to run, the United States were forced to scratch from the 4×400 m relay where they would have been heavily favored to win.
- Dave Wottle won the men's 800 m, after being last for the first 600 m, at which point he started to pass runner after runner up the final straightaway, finally grabbing the lead in the final 18 metres to win by 0.03 seconds ahead of the favorite, the Soviet Yevgeny Arzhanov. At the victory ceremony, Wottle forgot to remove his golf cap. This was interpreted by some as a form of protest against the Vietnam War, but Wottle later apologized.
- Australian swimmer Shane Gould won three gold medals, a silver, and a bronze medal at the age of 15.
- Hurdler Abdalá Bucaram carried the Ecuadorian flag at the opening ceremony. 24 years later he became the President of Ecuador. In Munich, he had to pull out of his event due to injury.
- Handball (last held in 1936) and Archery (last held in 1920) returned as Olympic sports after a long absence.
- Slalom canoeing was held for the first time at the Olympics.
- Dan Gable won the gold medal in wrestling without having a single point scored against him. No other athlete has ever accomplished such a feat in Olympic wrestling.
- Wim Ruska became the first judoka to win two gold medals.
- For the first time, the Olympic Oath was taken by a representative of the referees.
- American Frank Shorter, who was born in Munich, became the first from his country in 64 years to win the Olympic marathon. As Shorter was nearing the stadium, German student Norbert Sudhaus entered the stadium wearing a track uniform, joined the race and ran the last kilometre; thinking he was the winner, the crowd began cheering him before officials realized the hoax and security escorted Sudhaus off the track. Arriving seconds later, Shorter was understandably perplexed to see someone ahead of him and to hear the boos and catcalls meant for Sudhaus. This was the third time in Olympic history that an American had won the marathon (after Thomas Hicks 1904 and Johnny Hayes 1908) — and in none of those three instances did the winner enter the stadium first.

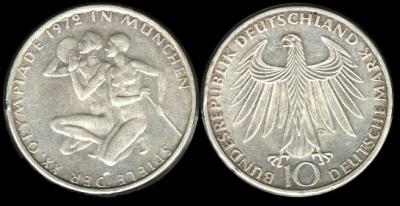
Munich Olympics commemorative 10-mark coin, 1972

- Rick DeMont of the United States originally won the gold medal in the men's 400 metre freestyle swimming. Following the race, the International Olympic Committee (IOC) stripped DeMont of his gold medal after his post-race urinalysis tested positive for traces of the banned substance ephedrine contained in his prescription asthma medication, Marax. The positive test following the 400-meter freestyle final also deprived him of a chance at multiple medals, as he was not permitted to swim in any other events at the 1972 Olympics, including the 1,500-meter freestyle for which he was the then-current world record-holder. Before the Olympics, DeMont had properly declared his asthma medications on his medical disclosure forms, but the U.S. Olympic Committee (USOC) had not cleared them with the IOC's medical committee. The United States Olympic Committee (USOC) has recognized his gold medal performance in the 1972 Summer Olympics in 2001, but only the IOC has the power to restore his medal, and it has refused to do so as of 2020.
- The men's pole vault field event at the games took place on 1 & 2 September. Controversy arose when the new Cata-Pole, used by defending champion American Bob Seagren and Sweden's Kjell Isaksson, was declared to be illegal, by the IAAF, on 25 July. The pole was banned based on the fact that the pole contained carbon fibers; after an East German-led protest revealed that it contained no carbon fibers, the ban was lifted on 27 August. Three days later the IAAF reversed itself again, reinstating the ban. The poles were then confiscated from the athletes. Seagren and Isaksson believed this gave other athletes, like the eventual gold medalist, Wolfgang Nordwig, an unfair advantage. Seagren and Isaksson were given substitute poles which they had never used before to jump with. Isaksson, who had lost the world record to Seagren only two months earlier, didn't clear a height in the qualifying round and was eliminated. After Seagren's last vault he was so incensed by the way IAAF officials handled the event, he took the pole he had been forced to vault with and handed it back to IAAF President Adriaan Paulen. This was the first Olympics where the pole vault had not been won by an American. Prior to 1972, the United States had won 16 straight. Since 1972, the United States has won the men's pole vault only twice, equalling the record of Poland and former republics of the Soviet Union. France has won three times since 1984.
- Badminton and water skiing were demonstration sports.
- Two images of the Olympic Games were included on the Voyager Golden Record.

== Venues ==
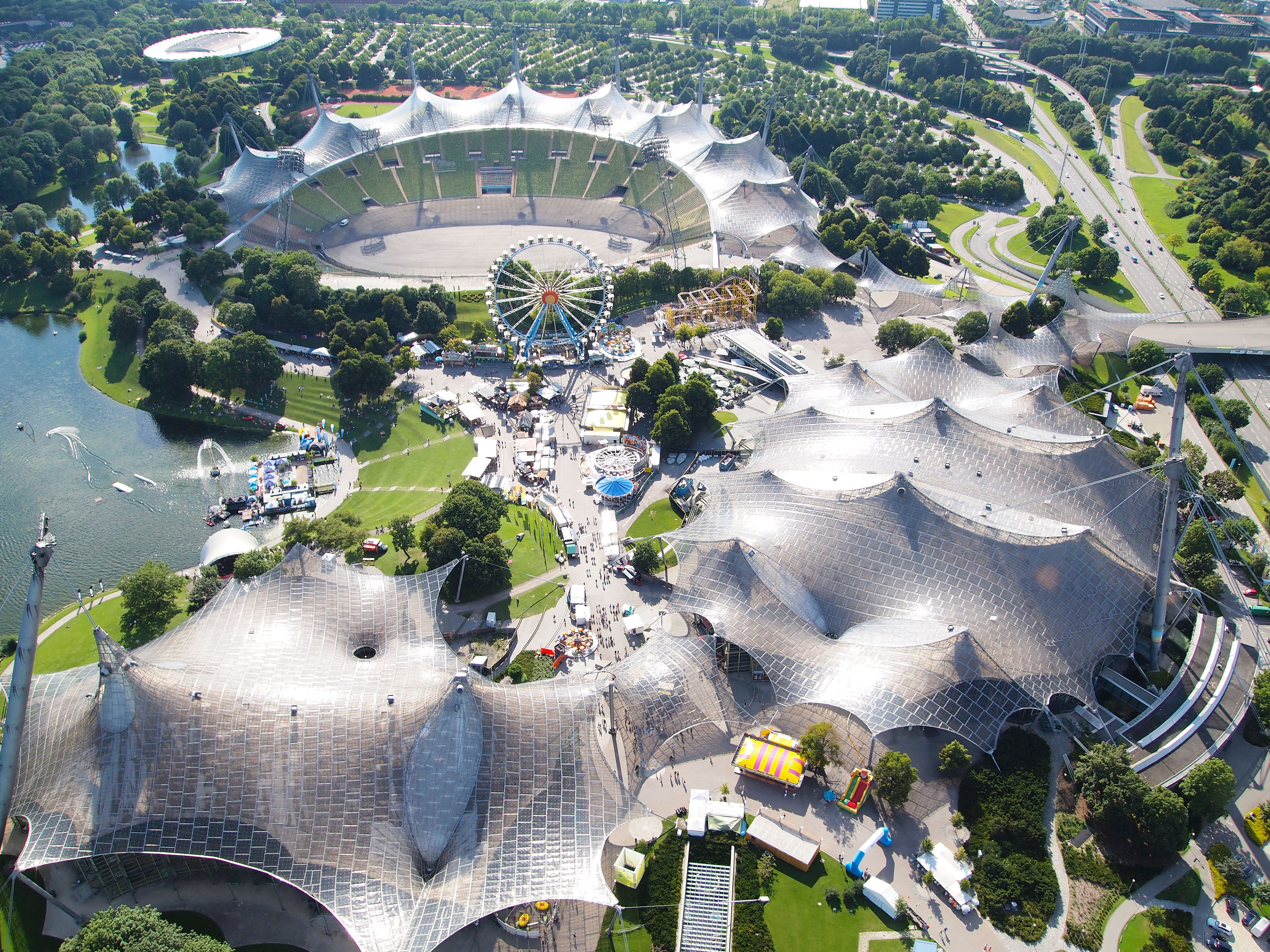
Aerial view of the Olympiapark in 2014.

- Munich Olympic Park (Olympiapark)
  - Olympic Stadium (Olympiastadion) – opening/closing ceremonies, athletics, equestrian (jumping team), football (final), modern pentathlon (running), memorial service for Israeli athletes
  - Boxing Hall (Boxhalle) – boxing, judo (final)
  - Cycling Stadium (Radstadion) – cycling (track)
  - Olympic Sports Hall (Sporthalle) – gymnastics, handball (final)
  - Hockey Facility (Hockeyanlage) – field hockey
  - Swimming Hall (Schwimmhalle) – swimming, diving, water polo (final), modern pentathlon (swimming)
  - Volleyball Hall (Volleyballhalle) – volleyball
  - Olympic Village (Olympisches Dorf)
- Venues in Greater Munich
  - Regatta Course (Regattastrecke), Oberschleißheim – canoe sprint, rowing
  - Basketball Hall (Basketballhalle), Siegenburger Straße – basketball, judo
  - Fairgrounds, Fencing Hall 1 (Messegelände, Fechthalle 1) – fencing (final)
  - Fairgrounds, Fencing Hall 2 (Messe München#1972 Summer Olympics, Fechthalle 2) – fencing, modern pentathlon (fencing)
  - Fairgrounds, Weightlifting Hall (Messe München#1972 Summer Olympics, Gewichtheberhalle) – weightlifting
  - Fairgrounds, Judo and Wrestling Hall (Messe München#1972 Summer Olympics, Judo- und Ringerhalle) – judo, wrestling
  - Dante Swimming Pool (Dantebad) – water polo
  - Shooting Facility (Schießanlage), Hochbrück – shooting, modern pentathlon (shooting)
  - Archery Facility (Bogenschießanlage), Englischer Garten – archery
  - Riding Facility, Riem – equestrian (jumping individual, eventing cross-country), modern pentathlon (riding)
  - Dressage Facility Nymphenburg – equestrian (dressage)
  - Grünwald – cycling (individual road race)
- Other venues
  - Olympic Yachting Center, Kiel-Schilksee – water skiing, sailing
  - Urban Stadium (Nuremberg) – football/soccer preliminaries
  - Jahnstadion (Regensburg) – football/soccer preliminaries
  - Dreiflüssestadion (Passau) – football/soccer preliminaries
  - ESV-Stadion (Ingolstadt) – football/soccer preliminaries
  - Augsburg – canoe slalom (Eiskanal), football/soccer preliminaries (Rosenaustadion), handball preliminaries (Sporthalle Augsburg)
  - Donauhalle Ulm – handball preliminaries
  - Hohenstaufenhalle Göppingen (Göppingen) – handball preliminaries
  - Böblingen Sportshalle – handball preliminaries
  - Bundesautobahn 95 – cycling (road team time trial)

== Cost ==
The Oxford Olympics Study established the outturn cost of the Munich 1972 Summer Olympics at US$1.0 billion in 2015-dollars. This includes sports-related costs only, that is, (i) operational costs incurred by the organizing committee for the purpose of staging the Games, e.g., expenditures for technology, transportation, workforce, administration, security, catering, ceremonies, and medical services, and (ii) direct capital costs incurred by the host city and country or private investors to build, e.g., the competition venues, the Olympic village, international broadcast center, and media and press center, which are required to host the Games. Indirect capital costs are not included, such as for road, rail, or airport infrastructure, or for hotel upgrades or other business investment incurred in preparation for the Games but not directly related to staging the Games. The cost for Munich 1972 compares with costs of US$4.6 billion for Rio 2016, US$15 billion for London 2012 (the most costly Summer Olympics to date) and US$51 billion for Sochi 2014 — the most expensive Olympic Games in history. Average cost for Summer Games since 1960 is US$5.2 billion.

== Sports ==
The 1972 Summer Olympic programme featured 195 events in the following 21 sports:

- Aquatics
  - Diving (4)
  - Swimming (29)
  - Water polo (1)
- Archery (2)
- Athletics (38)
- Basketball (1)
- Boxing (11)
- Canoeing
  - Flatwater (7)
  - Slalom (4)
- Cycling
  - Road (2)
  - Track (5)
- Equestrian
  - Dressage (2)
  - Eventing (2)
  - Show jumping (2)
- Fencing (8)
- Field hockey (1)
- Football (1)
- Gymnastics (14)
- Handball (1)
- Judo (6)
- Modern pentathlon (2)
- Rowing (7)
- Sailing (6)
- Shooting (8)
- Volleyball (2)
- Weightlifting (9)
- Wrestling
  - Freestyle (10)
  - Greco-Roman (10)

=== Demonstration sports ===
- Badminton
- Water skiing

== Participating National Olympic Committees ==
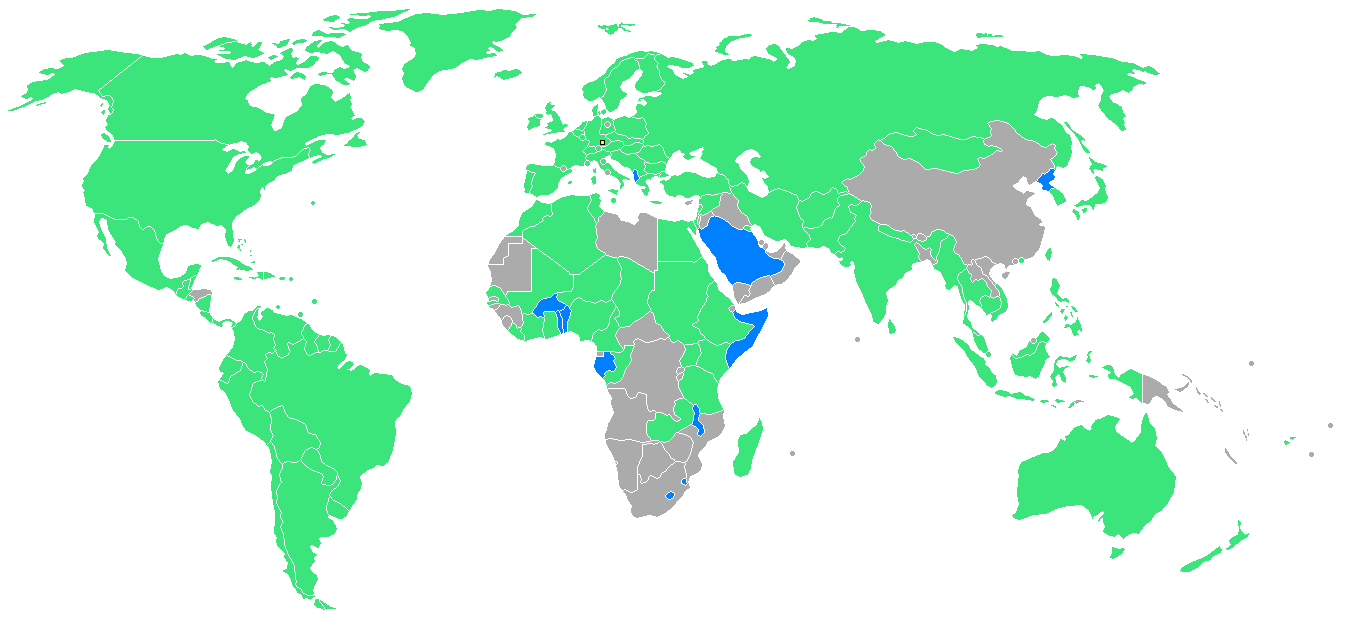
Participants

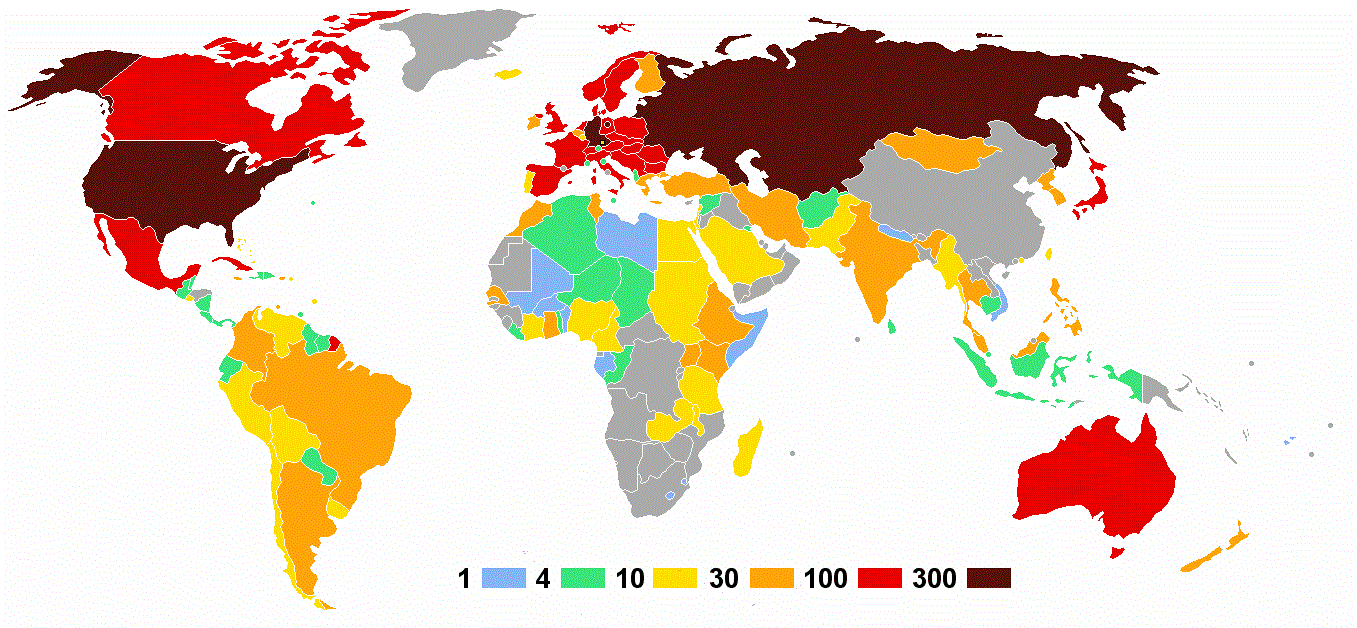
Number of competitors per nation.

Eleven nations made their first Olympic appearance in Munich: Albania, Dahomey (now Benin), Gabon, North Korea, Lesotho, Malawi, Saudi Arabia, Somalia, Swaziland, Togo, Upper Volta (now Burkina Faso).

Rhodesia's invitation to take part in the 1972 Summer Games was withdrawn by the International Olympic Committee four days before the opening ceremony, in response to African countries' (such as Ethiopia and Kenya) protests against the Rhodesian government. (Rhodesia did, however, compete in the 1972 Summer Paralympics, held a little earlier in Heidelberg.) The People's Republic of China last competed at the 1952 Summer Games but had since withdrawn from the IOC due to a dispute with the Republic of China over the right to represent China.

Participating National Olympic Committees
- Afghanistan (8)
- Albania (5)
- Algeria (5)
- Argentina (92)
- Australia (168)
- Austria (111)
- Bahamas (20)
- Barbados (13)
- Belgium (88)
- Bermuda (9)
- Bolivia (11)
- Brazil (81)
- British Honduras (1)
- Bulgaria (130)
- Burma (18)
- Cameroon (11)
- Canada (208)
- Ceylon (4)
- Chad (4)
- Chile (11)
- Republic of China (21)
- Colombia (59)
- Republic of the Congo (6)
- Costa Rica (3)
- Cuba (137)
- Czechoslovakia (181)
- Dahomey (3)
- Denmark (126)
- Dominican Republic (5)
- Ecuador (2)
- Egypt (23)
- El Salvador (11)
- Ethiopia (31)
- Fiji (2)
- Finland (96)
- France (227)
- Gabon (1)
- East Germany (297)
- West Germany (423) (host)
- Ghana (35)
- Great Britain (284)
- Greece (60)
- Guatemala (8)
- Guyana (3)
- Haiti (7)
- Hong Kong (10)
- Hungary (232)
- Iceland (25)
- India (41)
- Indonesia (6)
- Iran (50)
- Ireland (59)
- Israel (14)
- Italy (224)
- Ivory Coast (11)
- Jamaica (33)
- Japan (184)
- Kenya (57)
- Khmer Republic (9)
- North Korea (37)
- South Korea (42)
- Kuwait (4)
- Lebanon (19)
- Lesotho (1)
- Liberia (5)
- Liechtenstein (6)
- Luxembourg (11)
- Madagascar (11)
- Malawi (16)
- Malaysia (45)
- Mali (3)
- Malta (5)
- Mexico (174)
- Monaco (5)
- Mongolia (39)
- Morocco (35)
- Nepal (2)
- Netherlands (119)
- Netherlands Antilles (2)
- New Zealand (89)
- Nicaragua (8)
- Niger (4)
- Nigeria (25)
- Norway (112)
- Pakistan (25)
- Panama (7)
- Paraguay (3)
- Peru (20)
- Philippines (53)
- Poland (290)
- Portugal (29)
- Puerto Rico (53)
- Romania (159)
- San Marino (7)
- Saudi Arabia (10)
- Senegal (38)
- Singapore (7)
- Somalia (3)
- Soviet Union (371)
- Spain (123)
- Sudan (26)
- Suriname (2)
- Swaziland (2)
- Sweden (131)
- Switzerland (151)
- Syria (5)
- Tanzania (15)
- Thailand (33)
- Togo (7)
- Trinidad and Tobago (19)
- Tunisia (35)
- Turkey (43)
- Uganda (33)
- United States (400)
- Upper Volta (1)
- Uruguay (13)
- Venezuela (23)
- Vietnam (2)
- Virgin Islands (16)
- Yugoslavia (126)
- Zambia (11)

=== Number of athletes by National Olympic Committees ===
IOC Letter Code	Country	Athletes
AFG	Afghanistan	8
ALB	Albania	5
ALG	Algeria	5
ARG	Argentina	92
AUS	Australia	168
AUT	Austria	111
BAH	Bahamas	20
BAR	Barbados	13
BEL	Belgium	88
BER	Bermuda	9
BOL	Bolivia	11
BRA	Brazil	81
HBR	British Honduras	1
BUL	Bulgaria	130
BIR	Burma	18
CMR	Cameroon	11
CAN	Canada	208
CEY	Ceylon	4
CHA	Chad	4
CHI	Chile	11
ROC	Republic of China	21
COL	Colombia	59
CGO	Republic of the Congo	6
CRC	Costa Rica	3
CUB	Cuba	137
TCH	Czechoslovakia	181
DAH	Dahomey	3
DEN	Denmark	126
DOM	Dominican Republic	5
ECU	Ecuador	2
EGY	Egypt	23
SAL	El Salvador	11
ETH	Ethiopia	31
FIJ	Fiji	2
FIN	Finland	96
FRA	France	227
GAB	Gabon	1
GDR	East Germany	297
GER	West Germany	423
GHA	Ghana	35
GBR	Great Britain	284
GRE	Greece	60
GUA	Guatemala	8
GUY	Guyana	3
HAI	Haiti	7
HKG	Hong Kong	10
HUN	Hungary	232
ISL	Iceland	25
IND	India	41
INA	Indonesia	6
IRN	Iran	50
IRL	Ireland	59
ISR	Israel	14
ITA	Italy	224
CIV	Ivory Coast	11
JAM	Jamaica	33
JPN	Japan	184
KEN	Kenya	57
KHM	Khmer Republic	9
PRK	North Korea	37
COR	South Korea	42
KUW	Kuwait	4
LIB	Lebanon	19
LES	Lesotho	1
LBR	Liberia	5
LIE	Liechtenstein	6
LUX	Luxembourg	11
MAD	Madagascar	11
MAW	Malawi	16
MAS	Malaysia	45
MLI	Mali	3
MLT	Malta	5
MEX	Mexico	174
MON	Monaco	5
MGL	Mongolia	39
MAR	Morocco	35
NEP	Nepal	2
HOL	Netherlands	119
AHO	Netherlands Antilles	2
NZL	New Zealand	89
NCA	Nicaragua	8
NIG	Niger	4
NGR	Nigeria	25
NOR	Norway	112
PAK	Pakistan	25
PAN	Panama	7
PAR	Paraguay	3
PER	Peru	20
PHI	Philippines	53
POL	Poland	290
POR	Portugal	29
PUR	Puerto Rico	53
ROU	Romania	159
SMR	San Marino	7
ARS	Saudi Arabia	10
SEN	Senegal	38
SIN	Singapore	7
SOM	Somalia	3
URS	Soviet Union	371
ESP	Spain	123
SUD	Sudan	26
SUR	Suriname	2
SWZ	Swaziland	2
SWE	Sweden	131
SUI	Switzerland	151
SYR	Syria	5
TAN	Tanzania	15
THA	Thailand	33
TOG	Togo	7
TRI	Trinidad and Tobago	19
TUN	Tunisia	35
TUR	Turkey	43
UGA	Uganda	33
USA	United States	400
VOL	Upper Volta	1
URU	Uruguay	13
VEN	Venezuela	23
VNM	Vietnam	2
ISV	Virgin Islands	16
YUG	Yugoslavia	126
ZAM	Zambia	11
Total		7,134

== Calendar ==
All times are in Central European Time (UTC+1)

−8	OC	Opening ceremony	●	Event competitions	1	Gold medal events	CC	Closing ceremony	●	Suspended event competitions	MS	Memorial service

August/September 1972		August						September											Events
August/September 1972		26th Sat	27th Sun	28th Mon	29th Tue	30th Wed	31st Thu	1st Fri	2nd Sat	3rd Sun	4th Mon	5th Tue	6th Wed	7th Thu	8th Fri	9th Sat	10th Sun	11th Mon	Events
Ceremonies		OC											MS					CC	—N/a
Aquatics
Aquatics	Diving		●	1	●	1		●	1	●	1								34
Aquatics	Swimming			3	4	4	3	3	4	4	4								34
Aquatics	Water polo		●	●	●	●	●	●	●	●	1								34
Archery														●	●	●	2		2
Athletics							2	2	5	6	3			7	2	3	8		38
Basketball			●	●	●	●		●	●	●		●	●	●	●	1			1
Boxing			●	●	●	●	●	●	●	●	●	●	●	●			11		11
Canoeing	Slalom			1		3													11
Canoeing	Sprint											●		●	●	7			11
Cycling	Road cycling				1									1					7
Cycling	Track cycling						1	2	1	●	1								7
Equestrian				●	●	●	2			1	●			1		1		1	6
Fencing					●	1	1		1	1	1	●	1	●	1	1			8
Field hockey			●	●	●	●	●	●	●	●	●			●	●	●	1		1
Football			●	●	●	●	●	●		●		●	●		●		1		1
Gymnastics			●	1	1	2	4	6											14
Handball						●		●		●		●	●	●	●	●	1		1
Judo							1	1	1	1	1								5
Modern pentathlon			●	●	●	●	2												2
Rowing			●		●		●	●	7										7
Sailing				●	●	●	●			●	●			6					6
Shooting			1	1	1	1	●	2	2										8
Volleyball			●	●	●	●	●	●	●	●		●	●	1	●	1			2
Weightlifting			1	1	1	1	1		1	1	1	●	1						9
Wrestling			●	●	●	●	10					●	●	●	●	●	10		20
Daily medal events			2	8	8	13	27	16	23	14	13	‡	2	16	3	15	34	1	195
Cumulative total			2	10	18	31	58	74	97	111	124		126	142	145	160	194	195	195
August/September 1972		26th Sat	27th Sun	28th Mon	29th Tue	30th Wed	31st Thu	1st Fri	2nd Sat	3rd Sun	4th Mon	5th Tue	6th Wed	7th Thu	8th Fri	9th Sat	10th Sun	11th Mon	Total events
August/September 1972		August						September											Total events

‡ No medals were awarded on 5 September as all Olympic competitions were suspended during that day although events that were being held at the time of the suspension were allowed to finish to their conclusion.

Note: The Memorial service was held in the Olympic Stadium on 6 September which was attended by 80,000 spectators and 3,000 athletes. Following this all Olympic competitions were then allowed to resume after a 34-hour suspension.

== Medal count ==
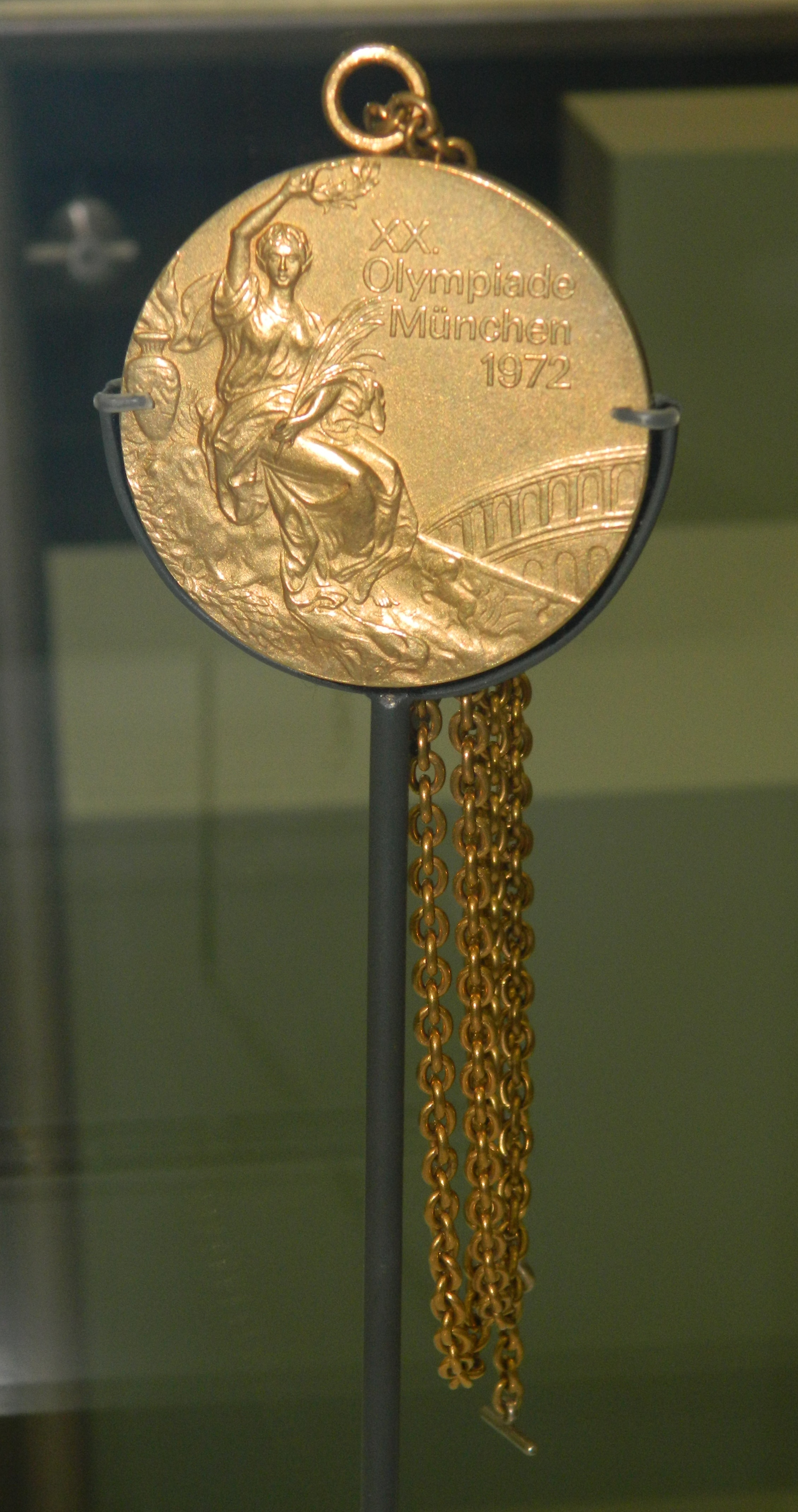
Gold medal awarded to Mary Peters for the 1972 Olympic women's pentathlon.

These are the top ten nations that won medals at the 1972 Games.

Rank	Nation	Gold	Silver	Bronze	Total
1	Soviet Union	50	27	22	99
2	United States	33	31	30	94
3	East Germany	20	23	23	66
4	West Germany*	13	11	16	40
5	Japan	13	8	8	29
6	Australia	8	7	2	17
7	Poland	7	5	9	21
8	Hungary	6	13	16	35
9	Bulgaria	6	10	5	21
10	Italy	5	3	10	18
Totals (10 entries)		161	138	141	440

Key

* Host nation (West Germany)

== Doping ==
The report, titled "Doping in Germany from 1950 to today", details how the West German government helped fund a wide-scale doping program. Doping of East German athletes also, by the GDR government, was systematic and prevalent at the Munich Games of 1972.

== See also ==
- 1972 Summer Paralympics
- 1972 Winter Olympics
- Olympic Games held in Germany
  - 1936 Winter Olympics – Garmisch-Partenkirchen
  - 1936 Summer Olympics – Berlin
  - 1972 Summer Olympics – Munich
- List of IOC country codes
- 1972 Summer Olympics – Munich, Bavaria, West Germany — Munich massacre
- 1972 Summer Olympics medal table
- The Rt. Hon. The 3rd Baron Killanin

== Notes and references ==
=== References ===
Summer Olympics
Preceded by Mexico City	XX Olympiad; Munich; 1972	Succeeded by Montreal
