= 1973 European Athletics Indoor Championships – Men's 60 metres =

The men's 60 metres event at the 1973 European Athletics Indoor Championships was held on 10 March in Rotterdam.

== Medalists ==
Gold	Silver	Bronze
Zenon Nowosz; Poland	Manfred Kokot; East Germany	Raimo Vilén; Finland

== Results ==
=== Heats ===
First 3 from each heat (Q) qualified directly for the semifinals.

Rank	Heat	Name	Nationality	Time	Notes
1	1	Zenon Nowosz	Poland	6.68	Q
2	5	Manfred Kokot	East Germany	6.72	Q
3	2	Brian Green	Great Britain	6.73	Q
4	3	Juris Silovs	Soviet Union	6.76	Q
5	2	Boris Izmestyev	Soviet Union	6.77	Q
5	5	Samuel Monsels	Netherlands	6.77	Q
7	4	Dorel Cristudor	Romania	6.78	Q
8	5	Vincenzo Guerini	Italy	6.80	Q
9	1	Raimo Vilén	Finland	6.81	Q
9	6	Luigi Benedetti	Italy	6.81	Q
9	6	Antti Rajamäki	Finland	6.81	Q
12	2	Mirolyub Stoychev	Bulgaria	6.82	Q
13	6	Hans-Joachim Zenk	East Germany	6.83	Q
14	2	Dominique Chauvelot	France	6.84	
14	4	Manfred Schumann	West Germany	6.84	Q
14	4	Manuel Carballo	Spain	6.84	Q, NR
17	3	Hans-Georg Teisner	West Germany	6.85	Q
18	2	Rolf Lewandowski	West Germany	6.87	
19	3	Michel Limousin	France	6.88	Q
19	3	Ryszard Tulkis	Poland	6.88	
19	5	Marc Delaunoit	Belgium	6.88	
22	5	Coen Jansen	Netherlands	6.90	
23	1	Alain Sarteur	France	6.91	Q
23	4	Georg Regner	Austria	6.91	NR
23	5	Francisco García	Spain	6.91	
26	6	Luis Sarría	Spain	6.92	
27	4	Raymond Heerenveen	Netherlands	6.93	
28	1	Krasimir Gutev	Bulgaria	6.96	
28	5	Juraj Demeč	Czechoslovakia	6.96	
30	6	Luděk Bohman	Czechoslovakia	6.97	
31	3	Rolf Trulsson	Sweden	6.99	
31	4	Thierry Boucquey	Belgium	6.99	
33	3	Gernot Massing	Austria	7.06	

=== Semifinals ===
First 2 from each heat (Q) qualified directly for the final.

Rank	Heat	Name	Nationality	Time	Notes
1	1	Zenon Nowosz	Poland	6.65	Q
2	2	Manfred Kokot	East Germany	6.66	Q
3	3	Brian Green	Great Britain	6.71	Q
4	3	Raimo Vilén	Finland	6.72	Q
5	1	Samuel Monsels	Netherlands	6.75	Q
5	2	Vincenzo Guerini	Italy	6.75	Q
7	1	Hans-Joachim Zenk	East Germany	6.77	
8	1	Dorel Cristudor	Romania	6.78	
8	2	Boris Izmestyev	Soviet Union	6.78	
10	1	Mirolyub Stoychev	Bulgaria	6.79	
10	2	Antti Rajamäki	Finland	6.79	
10	3	Luigi Benedetti	Italy	6.79	
13	3	Manuel Carballo	Spain	6.80	NR
14	3	Juris Silovs	Soviet Union	6.81	
15	2	Michel Limousin	France	6.82	
16	1	Alain Sarteur	France	6.84	
17	2	Manfred Schumann	West Germany	6.87	
18	3	Hans-Georg Teisner	West Germany	6.90	

=== Final ===
Rank	Name	Nationality	Time	Notes
1st place, gold medalist(s)	Zenon Nowosz	Poland	6.64	
2nd place, silver medalist(s)	Manfred Kokot	East Germany	6.66	
3rd place, bronze medalist(s)	Raimo Vilén	Finland	6.71	
4	Brian Green	Great Britain	6.74	
5	Samuel Monsels	Netherlands	6.81	
6	Vincenzo Guerini	Italy	6.84	
