= 1974 European Athletics Indoor Championships – Men's 60 metres =

The men's 60 metres event at the 1974 European Athletics Indoor Championships was held on 9 March in Gothenburg.

== Medalists ==
Gold	Silver	Bronze
Valeriy Borzov; Soviet Union	Manfred Kokot; East Germany	Aleksandr Kornelyuk; Soviet Union

== Results ==
=== Heats ===
First 4 from each heat (Q) qualified directly for the semifinals.

Rank	Heat	Name	Nationality	Time	Notes
1	4	Manfred Kokot	East Germany	6.66	Q
2	1	Christer Garpenborg	Sweden	6.68	Q
3	4	Zenon Nowosz	Poland	6.69	Q
4	1	Aleksandr Kornelyuk	Soviet Union	6.71	Q
5	1	Eberhard Weise	East Germany	6.73	Q
6	1	Dorel Cristudor	Romania	6.74	Q, NR
6	3	Vasilis Papageorgopoulos	Greece	6.74	Q
6	3	Juris Silovs	Soviet Union	6.74	Q
9	2	Valeriy Borzov	Soviet Union	6.78	Q
10	2	Hans-Jürgen Bombach	East Germany	6.79	Q
11	3	Dominique Chauvelot	France	6.80	Q
12	2	Lajos Gresa	Hungary	6.82	Q
13	4	Manfred Ommer	West Germany	6.83	Q
14	3	Rolf Trulsson	Sweden	6.84	Q
14	4	Raimo Vilén	Finland	6.84	Q
16	4	Raymond Heerenveen	Netherlands	6.85	
17	2	Alain Sarteur	France	6.86	Q
18	4	Audun Garshol	Norway	6.89	
19	2	Juraj Demeč	Czechoslovakia	6.90	
20	2	Jerzy Wieczorek	Poland	6.91	
20	2	Endre Lépold	Hungary	6.91	
22	1	Samuel Monsels	Netherlands	6.95	
23	3	José Luis Sánchez	Spain	6.96	
24	1	Kaj Pedersen	Denmark	6.97	

=== Semifinals ===
First 4 from each heat (Q) qualified directly for the final.

Rank	Heat	Name	Nationality	Time	Notes
1	1	Manfred Kokot	East Germany	6.58	Q, CR
2	1	Aleksandr Kornelyuk	Soviet Union	6.61	Q
3	1	Valeriy Borzov	Soviet Union	6.64	Q
3	2	Christer Garpenborg	Sweden	6.64	Q
5	2	Juris Silovs	Soviet Union	6.65	Q
6	1	Lajos Gresa	Hungary	6.68	Q
6	2	Zenon Nowosz	Poland	6.68	Q
8	1	Eberhard Weise	East Germany	6.69	
9	2	Vasilis Papageorgopoulos	Greece	6.71	Q
10	1	Dominique Chauvelot	France	6.73	
10	2	Hans-Jürgen Bombach	East Germany	6.73	
12	2	Dorel Cristudor	Romania	6.74	=NR
13	1	Rolf Trulsson	Sweden	6.76	
14	1	Manfred Ommer	West Germany	6.76	
15	2	Raimo Vilén	Finland	6.82	
16	2	Alain Sarteur	France	6.82	

=== Final ===
Rank	Name	Nationality	Time	Notes
1st place, gold medalist(s)	Valeriy Borzov	Soviet Union	6.58	=CR, NR
2nd place, silver medalist(s)	Manfred Kokot	East Germany	6.63	
3rd place, bronze medalist(s)	Aleksandr Kornelyuk	Soviet Union	6.66	
4	Christer Garpenborg	Sweden	6.66	
5	Juris Silovs	Soviet Union	6.68	
6	Zenon Nowosz	Poland	6.70	
7	Lajos Gresa	Hungary	6.71	
8	Vasilis Papageorgopoulos	Greece	6.73	
