= 1971 European Athletics Championships – Men's 100 metres =

Men's 100 metres at the 1971 European Athletics Championships
- Venue: Helsinki Olympic Stadium
- Location: Helsinki
- Dates: 10 August (heats); 11 August (semifinals & final)
- Competitors: 29 from 18 nations
- Winning time: 10.27

Medalists
gold medal	Valeriy Borzov	Soviet Union
silver medal	Gerhard Wucherer	West Germany
bronze medal	Vasilios Papageorgopoulos	Greece

The men's 100 metres at the 1971 European Athletics Championships was held in Helsinki, Finland, at Helsinki Olympic Stadium on 10 and 11 August 1971.

The winning margin was 0.22 seconds which with the conclusion of the 2024 championships remains the only time the men's 100 metres has been won by more than 0.2 seconds at these championships.

== Participation ==
According to an unofficial count, 29 athletes from 18 countries participated in the event.

- Czechoslovakia (3)
- Denmark (1)
- East Germany (3)
- Finland (1)
- France (3)
- Greece (1)
- Iceland (1)
- Italy (1)
- Norway (1)
- Poland (3)
- Romania (1)
- Soviet Union (2)
- Spain (1)
- Sweden (1)
- Switzerland (1)
- Turkey (1)
- Great Britain (1)
- West Germany (3)

== Results ==
=== Heats ===
10 August

==== Heat 1 ====
Rank	Name	Nationality	Time	Notes
1	Dominique Chauvelot	France	10.57	Q
2	Zenon Nowosz	Poland	10.62	Q
3	Karl-Heinz Klotz	West Germany	10.75	Q
4	Raimo Vilén	Finland	10.84	Q
5	Thorsten Johansson	Sweden	10.95	
6	Ole Egil Reitan	Norway	11.14	
			Wind: -1.6 m/s	

==== Heat 2 ====
Rank	Name	Nationality	Time	Notes
1	Valeriy Borzov	Soviet Union	10.56	Q
2	Hans-Jürgen Bombach	East Germany	10.75	Q
3	Eckart Brieger	West Germany	10.77	Q
4	Norberto Oliosi	Italy	10.82	Q
5	José Luis Sánchez Paraíso	Spain	10.87	
6	Petr Utekal	Czechoslovakia	10.98	
7	Alexandru Munteaunu	Romania	10.99	
8	Ertün Erdöl	Turkey	11.22	
			Wind: -1.3 m/s	

==== Heat 3 ====
Rank	Name	Nationality	Time	Notes
1	Gerhard Wucherer	West Germany	10.33	CR, Q
2	Gilles Échevin	France	10.44	Q
3	Aleksandr Kornelyuk	Soviet Union	10.44	Q
4	Brian Green	Great Britain	10.45	Q
5	Wiesław Maniak	Poland	10.74	
6	Juraj Demeč	Czechoslovakia	10.77	
7	Manfred Kokot	East Germany	10.78	
8	Bjarni Stefánsson	Iceland	11.00	
			Wind: -0.2 m/s	

==== Heat 4 ====
Rank	Name	Nationality	Time	Notes
1	Vasilios Papageorgopoulos	Greece	10.46	Q
2	Siegfried Schenke	East Germany	10.56	Q
3	Luděk Bohman	Czechoslovakia	10.69	Q
4	Philippe Clerc	Switzerland	10.73	Q
5	Tadeusz Cuch	Poland	10.75	
6	Søren Viggo Pedersen	Denmark	10.83	
7	René Metz	France	11.27	
			Wind: 0.0 m/s	

=== Semi-finals ===
11 August

==== Semi-final 1 ====
Rank	Name	Nationality	Time	Notes
1	Gilles Échevin	France	10.44	Q
2	Vasilios Papageorgopoulos	Greece	10.51	Q
3	Aleksandr Kornelyuk	Soviet Union	10.52	Q
4	Siegfried Schenke	East Germany	10.54	Q
5	Norberto Oliosi	Italy	10.68	
6	Karl-Heinz Klotz	West Germany	10.69	
7	Philippe Clerc	Switzerland	10.70	
	Raimo Vilén	Finland	DNS	
			Wind: 0.0 m/s	

==== Semi-final 2 ====
Rank	Name	Nationality	Time	Notes
1	Valeriy Borzov	Soviet Union	10.36	Q
2	Gerhard Wucherer	West Germany	10.44	Q
3	Zenon Nowosz	Poland	10.59	Q
4	Dominique Chauvelot	France	10.60	Q
5	Brian Green	Great Britain	10.62	
6	Hans-Jürgen Bombach	East Germany	10.75	
7	Eckart Brieger	West Germany	10.77	
8	Luděk Bohman	Czechoslovakia	10.84	
			Wind: 0.0 m/s	

=== Final ===
11 August

Rank	Name	Nationality	Time	Notes
1st place, gold medalist(s)	Valeriy Borzov	Soviet Union	10.27	CR
2nd place, silver medalist(s)	Gerhard Wucherer	West Germany	10.49	
3rd place, bronze medalist(s)	Vasilios Papageorgopoulos	Greece	10.56	
4	Siegfried Schenke	East Germany	10.63	
5	Zenon Nowosz	Poland	10.66	
6	Aleksandr Kornelyuk	Soviet Union	10.66	
7	Dominique Chauvelot	France	10.67	
8	Gilles Échevin	France	11.4	
			Wind: -1.3 m/s	
