= 1969 European Athletics Championships – Men's 100 metres =

Men's 100 metres at the 1969 European Athletics Championships
- Venue: Georgios Karaiskakis Stadium
- Location: Athens
- Dates: 16 September (heats); 17 September (semifinals & final)
- Competitors: 28 from 16 nations
- Winning time: 10.49

Medalists
gold medal	Valeriy Borzov	Soviet Union
silver medal	Alain Sarteur	France
bronze medal	Philippe Clerc	Switzerland

The men's 100 metres at the 1969 European Athletics Championships was held in Athens, Greece, at Georgios Karaiskakis Stadium on 16 and 17 September 1969.

== Participation ==
According to an unofficial count, 28 athletes from 16 countries participated in the event.

- Austria (1)
- Belgium (1)
- Czechoslovakia (3)
- East Germany (3)
- Finland (1)
- France (3)
- Greece (1)
- Malta (1)
- Norway (1)
- Poland (2)
- Soviet Union (3)
- Sweden (1)
- Switzerland (2)
- Turkey (1)
- Great Britain (3)
- Yugoslavia (1)

== Results ==
=== Heats ===
16 September

==== Heat 1 ====
Rank	Name	Nationality	Time	Notes
1	Valeriy Borzov	Soviet Union	10.7	Q
2	Hansruedi Wiedmer	Switzerland	10.8	Q
3	Hans-Jürgen Bombach	East Germany	10.8	Q
4	Ron Jones	Great Britain	10.9	Q
5	Ivica Karasi	Yugoslavia	11.0	
6	Vasilios Papageorgopoulos	Greece	11.0	
7	Godwin Zammit	Malta	11.8	
			Wind: -3.2 m/s	

==== Heat 2 ====
Rank	Name	Nationality	Time	Notes
1	Hermann Burde	East Germany	10.7	Q
2	René Metz	France	10.8	Q
3	Barrie Kelly	Great Britain	10.8	Q
4	Ossi Karttunen	Finland	10.8	Q
5	Tadeusz Cuch	Poland	10.9	
6	Ladislav Kříž	Czechoslovakia	11.0	
7	Paul Poels	Belgium	11.0	
			Wind: -3.3 m/s	

==== Heat 3 ====
Rank	Name	Nationality	Time	Notes
1	Alain Sarteur	France	10.6	Q
2	Peter Haase	East Germany	10.7	Q
3	Luděk Bohman	Czechoslovakia	10.8	Q
4	Vladislav Sapeya	Soviet Union	10.8	Q
5	Don Halliday	Great Britain	10.8	
6	Orhan Aydın	Turkey	11.0	
			Wind: -1.2 m/s	

==== Heat 4 ====
Rank	Name	Nationality	Time	Notes
1	Philippe Clerc	Switzerland	10.7	Q
2	Zenon Nowosz	Poland	10.7	Q
3	Gérard Fenouil	France	10.8	Q
4	Aleksandr Lebedev	Soviet Union	10.8	Q
5	Dionýz Szögedi	Czechoslovakia	10.9	
6	Axel Nepraunik	Austria	10.9	
7	Ole Bernt Skarstein	Norway	11.0	
8	Anders Faager	Sweden	12.4	
			Wind: -4.5 m/s	

=== Semi-finals ===
16 September

==== Semi-final 1 ====
Rank	Name	Nationality	Time	Notes
1	Philippe Clerc	Switzerland	10.5	Q
2	Valeriy Borzov	Soviet Union	10.5	Q
3	René Metz	France	10.5	Q
4	Peter Haase	East Germany	10.6	Q
5	Luděk Bohman	Czechoslovakia	10.6	
6	Hans-Jürgen Bombach	East Germany	10.7	
7	Ossi Karttunen	Finland	10.7	
8	Ron Jones	Great Britain	10.8	
			Wind: -2.3 m/s	

==== Semi-final 2 ====
Rank	Name	Nationality	Time	Notes
1	Alain Sarteur	France	10.6	Q
2	Hermann Burde	East Germany	10.6	Q
3	Gérard Fenouil	France	10.6	Q
4	Barrie Kelly	Great Britain	10.6	Q
5	Zenon Nowosz	Poland	10.6	
6	Hansruedi Wiedmer	Switzerland	10.7	
7	Aleksandr Lebedev	Soviet Union	10.8	
8	Vladislav Sapeya	Soviet Union	10.8	
			Wind: -3.1 m/s	

=== Final ===
17 September

Rank	Name	Nationality	Time	Notes
1st place, gold medalist(s)	Valeriy Borzov	Soviet Union	10.49	
2nd place, silver medalist(s)	Alain Sarteur	France	10.50	
3rd place, bronze medalist(s)	Philippe Clerc	Switzerland	10.56	
4	Gérard Fenouil	France	10.71	
5	Hermann Burde	East Germany	10.72	
6	Barrie Kelly	Great Britain	10.77	
7	Peter Haase	East Germany	10.84	
	René Metz	France	DNS	
			Wind: -2.7 m/s	
