= 1972 European Athletics Indoor Championships – Men's 50 metres =

The men's 50 metres event at the 1972 European Athletics Indoor Championships was held on 11 March in Grenoble.

== Medalists ==
Gold	Silver	Bronze
Valeriy Borzov; Soviet Union	Aleksandr Kornelyuk; Soviet Union	Vasilis Papageorgopoulos; Greece

== Results ==
=== Heats ===
First 4 from each heat (Q) qualified directly for the semifinals.

Rank	Heat	Name	Nationality	Time	Notes
1	3	Vasilis Papageorgopoulos	Greece	5.75	Q, WB
2	3	Aleksandr Kornelyuk	Soviet Union	5.80	Q
3	1	Gerhard Wucherer	West Germany	5.82	Q
4	2	Valeriy Borzov	Soviet Union	5.83	Q
5	2	Raimo Vilén	Finland	5.88	Q
6	1	Manuel Carballo	Spain	5.92	Q
6	1	Barrie Kelly	Great Britain	5.92	Q
6	2	Manfred Schumann	West Germany	5.92	Q
9	2	Romain Roels	Belgium	6.01	Q
9	3	Patrick Bourbeillon	France	6.01	Q, NR
9	3	Philippe Clerc	Switzerland	6.01	Q
12	1	Erik Gustafsson	Finland	6.02	Q
12	2	Søren Viggo Pedersen	Denmark	6.02	
12	3	Vittorio Roscio	Italy	6.02	
15	1	Luděk Bohman	Czechoslovakia	6.13	

=== Semifinals ===
First 3 from each heat (Q) qualified directly for the final.

Rank	Heat	Name	Nationality	Time	Notes
1	1	Vasilis Papageorgopoulos	Greece	5.77	Q
1	2	Valeriy Borzov	Soviet Union	5.77	Q, NR
3	1	Aleksandr Kornelyuk	Soviet Union	5.80	Q
4	1	Raimo Vilén	Finland	5.82	Q, NR
5	2	Gerhard Wucherer	West Germany	5.83	Q
6	1	Patrick Bourbeillon	France	5.85	
7	2	Manuel Carballo	Spain	5.90	Q, NR
8	1	Barrie Kelly	Great Britain	5.92	
8	2	Manfred Schumann	West Germany	5.92	
10	2	Romain Roels	Belgium	5.98	
11	2	Erik Gustafsson	Finland	6.05	
12	1	Philippe Clerc	Switzerland	6.15	

=== Final ===
Rank	Name	Nationality	Time	Notes
1st place, gold medalist(s)	Valeriy Borzov	Soviet Union	5.75	=WB
2nd place, silver medalist(s)	Aleksandr Kornelyuk	Soviet Union	5.81	
3rd place, bronze medalist(s)	Vasilis Papageorgopoulos	Greece	5.82	
4	Gerhard Wucherer	West Germany	5.84	
5	Raimo Vilén	Finland	5.93	
6	Manuel Carballo	Spain	6.28	
