= 1971 European Athletics Indoor Championships – Men's 60 metres =

The men's 60 metres event at the 1971 European Athletics Indoor Championships was held on 13 March in Sofia.

== Medalists ==
Gold	Silver	Bronze
Valeriy Borzov; Soviet Union	Jobst Hirscht; West Germany	Manfred Kokot; East Germany

== Results ==
=== Heats ===
First 4 from each heat (Q) qualified directly for the semifinals.

Rank	Heat	Name	Nationality	Time	Notes
1	1	Valeriy Borzov	Soviet Union	6.8	Q
2	1	Vasilios Papageorgopoulos	Greece	6.8	Q
3	1	Zenon Nowosz	Poland	6.8	Q
4	1	Alain Sarteur	France	6.8	Q
5	1	Gernot Hirscht	West Germany	6.8	
1	2	Manfred Kokot	East Germany	6.7	Q
2	2	Jobst Hirscht	West Germany	6.7	Q
3	2	Georgi Yovchev	Bulgaria	6.8	Q
4	2	Boris Izmestyev	Soviet Union	6.9	Q
5	2	Gert Herunter	Austria	6.9	
1	3	Aleksandr Kornelyuk	Soviet Union	6.8	Q
2	3	Romain Roels	Belgium	6.9	Q
3	3	Barrie Kelly	Great Britain	6.9	Q
4	3	Petr Utekal	Czechoslovakia	7.0	Q
5	3	Fernando Escrivá	Spain	7.0	
6	3	Georg Regner	Austria	7.1	

=== Semifinals ===
First 3 from each heat (Q) qualified directly for the final.

Rank	Heat	Name	Nationality	Time	Notes
1	1	Manfred Kokot	East Germany	6.7	Q
2	1	Aleksandr Kornelyuk	Soviet Union	6.8	Q
3	1	Vasilios Papageorgopoulos	Greece	6.8	Q
4	1	Barrie Kelly	Great Britain	6.8	
5	1	Romain Roels	Belgium	6.8	
	1	Georgi Yovchev	Bulgaria	DQ	
1	2	Jobst Hirscht	West Germany	6.7	Q
2	2	Valeriy Borzov	Soviet Union	6.7	Q
3	2	Boris Izmestyev	Soviet Union	6.8	Q
4	2	Zenon Nowosz	Poland	6.9	
5	2	Alain Sarteur	France	7.0	
6	2	Petr Utekal	Czechoslovakia	7.0	

=== Final ===
Rank	Name	Nationality	Time	Notes
1st place, gold medalist(s)	Valeriy Borzov	Soviet Union	6.6	
2nd place, silver medalist(s)	Jobst Hirscht	West Germany	6.7	
3rd place, bronze medalist(s)	Manfred Kokot	East Germany	6.8	
4	Boris Izmestyev	Soviet Union	6.8	
5	Vasilios Papageorgopoulos	Greece	6.8	
6	Aleksandr Kornelyuk	Soviet Union	6.9	
