= 60 metres world record progression =

The following table shows the world record progression in the men's and women's indoor 60 metres, as recognised by the IAAF. The IAAF have officially ratified world indoor records since 1 January 1987; previous to this, they were regarded as world indoor bests.

== Men ==
=== Pre-IAAF ===
Time	Athlete	Date	Place
Pre-IAAF ratified bests (prior to 1966)
6.6	Jesse Owens (USA)	23 February 1935	New York City, United States
6.6	Ben Johnson (USA)	23 February 1935	New York City, United States
6.6	Ben Johnson (USA)	26 February 1938	New York City, United States
6.6	Herbert Thompson (USA)	25 February 1939	New York City, United States
6.6	Barney Ewell (USA)	1942	New York City, United States

=== World record progression: 1966–present ===
Ratified
Not ratified
Ratified but later rescinded
Pending ratification

Time	Athlete	Date	Place
IAAF ratified bests (1966–1986)
6.6	Barrie Kelly (GBR)	27 March 1966	Westfalenhalle, West Germany
6.6 (Note: Kelly ran 6.6 in his semi-final at the European Indoor Games, and again in the final with Erbstößer and Kassatkin; the photofinish gave Kelly first, Erbstößer second and Kassatkin third, with each man being credited as having equalled the world record.)	Barrie Kelly (GBR)	27 March 1966	Westfalenhalle, West Germany
6.6	Heinz Erbstößer (GDR)	27 March 1966	Westfalenhalle, West Germany
6.6	Viktor Kassatkin (URS)	27 March 1966	Westfalenhalle, West Germany
6.6	Valeriy Borzov (URS)	14 March 1970	Vienna, Austria
6.6	Valeriy Borzov (URS)	13 March 1971	Sofia, Bulgaria
6.68	Hans-Joachim Zenk (GDR)	24 February 1973	Senftenberg, East Germany
6.62	Manfred Kokot (GDR)	24 February 1973	Senftenberg, East Germany
6.52	Zenon Nowosz (POL)	25 February 1973	Zabrze, Poland
IAAF ratified records (1987–present)
6.50	Ben Johnson (CAN) (Note: This time, along with his 6.44 on the same day and 6.41 in 1987, was rescinded in September 1989 after Johnson admitted to steroid use between 1981 and 1988.)	15 January 1986	Osaka, Japan
6.44	Ben Johnson (CAN)	15 January 1986	Osaka, Japan
6.52 (Note: Woronin's performances were not regarded as world indoor bests / records since Ben Johnson had run 6.50 and 6.44 in January 1986. Johnson ran ten times in the 6.41-6.50 range between 1986 and 1988, but all of these were rescinded after his admission to steroid use.)	Marian Woronin (POL)	21 February 1987	Liévin, France
6.51	Marian Woronin (POL)	21 February 1987	Liévin, France
6.41	Ben Johnson (CAN)	7 March 1987	Indianapolis, United States
6.50	Lee McRae (USA)	7 March 1987	Indianapolis, United States
6.48	Leroy Burrell (USA)	13 February 1991	Madrid, Spain
6.45	Andre Cason (USA)	29 January 1992	Ghent, Belgium
6.41	Andre Cason (USA)	14 February 1992	Madrid, Spain
6.41	Maurice Greene (USA)	1 February 1998	Stuttgart, Germany
6.39	Maurice Greene (USA)	3 February 1998	Madrid, Spain
6.39	Maurice Greene (USA)	3 March 2001	Atlanta, United States
6.37 (Note: Time rejected as a record since starting blocks were not wired, and drug testing was not done immediately after the race.)	Christian Coleman (USA)	20 January 2018	Clemson, United States
6.34	Christian Coleman (USA)	18 February 2018	Albuquerque, United States

== Women ==
The existing world indoor best, Nelli Cooman's 7.00 set in 1986, was deemed to be the inaugural world indoor record.

=== World bests ===
World bests 60 metres 1966–86
Athlete (Nation)	Time in s	Location	Date	Ref.
Margit Nemesházi (HUN)	7.2 h	Westfalenhalle, West Germany	27 March 1966	
Annegret Richter (FRG)	7.2	Rotterdam, Netherlands	11 March 1973	
Annegret Richter (FRG)	7.2 (Note: Richter ran 7.27 in the final at the European Indoor Championships, with Kandarr second in 7.29; as these times were 7.2 to the tenth of a second, each woman was credited as having equalled the world record.)	Rotterdam, Netherlands	11 March 1973	
Petra Kandarr (GDR)	7.2	Rotterdam, Netherlands	11 March 1973	
Irena Szewinska (POL)	7.24	Gothenburg, Sweden	10 March 1974	
Mona-Lisa Pursiainen (FIN)	7.22	Gothenburg, Sweden	10 March 1974	
Renate Stecher (GDR)	7.16	Gothenburg, Sweden	10 March 1974	
Marlies Göhr (GDR)	7.12	Milan, Italy	12 March 1978	
Marlies Göhr (GDR)	7.12	Berlin, East Germany	12 January 1980	
Marlies Göhr (GDR)	7.10	Senftenberg, East Germany	26 January 1980	
Marita Koch (GDR)	7.10	Senftenberg, East Germany	14 February 1981	
Marita Koch (GDR)	7.08	Senftenberg, East Germany	29 January 1983	
Marita Koch (GDR)	7.04	Senftenberg, East Germany	16 February 1985	

=== World records ===
World records of 60 metres since 1987
Athlete (Nation)	Time in s	Location	Date	Ref.
Nelli Cooman (NED)	7.00	Madrid, Spain	23 February 1986	
Merlene Ottey (JAM)	6.96	Madrid, Spain	14 February 1992	
Irina Privalova (RUS)	6.92	Madrid, Spain	11 February 1993	
Irina Privalova (RUS)	6.92	Madrid, Spain	9 February 1995	
