= 1971 European Athletics Championships – Men's 200 metres =

Men's 200 metres at the 1971 European Athletics Championships
- Venue: Helsinki Olympic Stadium
- Location: Helsinki
- Dates: 12 August (heats & semi-finals); 13 August (final)
- Competitors: 28 from 18 nations
- Winning time: 20.31

Medalists
gold medal	Valeriy Borzov	Soviet Union
silver medal	Franz-Peter Hofmeister	West Germany
bronze medal	Jörg Pfeifer	East Germany

The men's 200 metres at the 1971 European Athletics Championships was held in Helsinki, Finland, at Helsinki Olympic Stadium on 12 and 13 August 1971.

== Participation ==
According to an unofficial count, 28 athletes from 18 countries participated in the event.

- Belgium (1)
- Czechoslovakia (3)
- Denmark (1)
- East Germany (2)
- Finland (1)
- France (3)
- Great Britain (1)
- Iceland (1)
- Italy (1)
- Poland (1)
- Romania (1)
- Soviet Union (3)
- Spain (2)
- Sweden (1)
- Switzerland (2)
- Turkey (1)
- West Germany (2)
- Yugoslavia (1)

== Results ==
=== Heats ===
12 August

==== Heat 1 ====
Rank	Name	Nationality	Time	Notes
1	Franz-Peter Hofmeister	West Germany	20.92	Q
2	Jörg Pfeifer	East Germany	21.35	Q
3	Zenon Nowosz	Poland	21.47	Q
4	Aleksey Chebykin	Soviet Union	21.58	Q
5	José Luis Sánchez Paraíso	Spain	21.60	
6	Ladislav Kříž	Czechoslovakia	21.71	
7	Bjarni Stefánsson	Iceland	21.97	

==== Heat 2 ====
Rank	Name	Nationality	Time	Notes
1	Aleksandr Zhidkikh	Soviet Union	21.35	Q
2	Charles Ducasse	France	21.40	Q
3	Philippe Clerc	Switzerland	21.53	Q
4	Luděk Bohman	Czechoslovakia	21.61	Q
5	Jean-Pierre Borlée	Belgium	21.68	
6	Ertuğrul Oğulbolan	Turkey	22.1	

==== Heat 3 ====
Rank	Name	Nationality	Time	Notes
1	Gérard Fenouil	France	21.14	Q
2	Pietro Mennea	Italy	21.20	Q
3	Siegfried Schenke	East Germany	21.32	Q
4	Reto Diezi	Switzerland	21.47	Q
5	Karl Honz	West Germany	21.52	
6	Ossi Karttunen	Finland	21.64	
7	Predrag Križan	Yugoslavia	21.87	
8	Alexandru Munteanu	Romania	22.11	

==== Heat 4 ====
Rank	Name	Nationality	Time	Notes
1	Valeriy Borzov	Soviet Union	21.16	Q
2	Joseph Arame	France	21.44	Q
3	Jiří Kynos	Czechoslovakia	21.54	Q
4	Luis Sarría	Spain	21.56	Q
5	Søren Viggo Pedersen	Denmark	21.69	
6	Martin Reynolds	Great Britain	21.71	
7	Bo Söderberg	Sweden	21.91	

=== Semi-finals ===
12 August

==== Heat 1 ====
Rank	Name	Nationality	Time	Notes
1	Valeriy Borzov	Soviet Union	20.86	Q
2	Franz-Peter Hofmeister	West Germany	20.93	Q
3	Aleksandr Zhidkikh	Soviet Union	21.04	Q
4	Siegfried Schenke	East Germany	21.21	Q
5	Luis Sarría	Spain	21.35	
6	Joseph Arame	France	21.43	
7	Reto Diezi	Switzerland	21.53	
8	Jiří Kynos	Czechoslovakia	21.54	
			Wind: -0.2 m/s	

==== Heat 2 ====
Rank	Name	Nationality	Time	Notes
1	Gérard Fenouil	France	21.15	Q
2	Pietro Mennea	Italy	21.23	Q
3	Philippe Clerc	Switzerland	21.25	Q
4	Jörg Pfeifer	East Germany	21.29	Q
5	Luděk Bohman	Czechoslovakia	21.37	
6	Charles Ducasse	France	21.40	
7	Aleksey Chebykin	Soviet Union	21.45	
8	Zenon Nowosz	Poland	21.56	

=== Final ===
13 August

Rank	Name	Nationality	Time	Notes
1st place, gold medalist(s)	Valeriy Borzov	Soviet Union	20.31	CR
2nd place, silver medalist(s)	Franz-Peter Hofmeister	West Germany	20.71	
3rd place, bronze medalist(s)	Jörg Pfeifer	East Germany	20.73	
4	Siegfried Schenke	East Germany	20.74	
5	Philippe Clerc	Switzerland	20.86	
6	Pietro Mennea	Italy	20.88	
7	Gérard Fenouil	France	20.92	
8	Aleksandr Zhidkikh	Soviet Union	21.23	
