= 1966 European Indoor Games – Men's 60 metres =

The men's 60 metres event at the 1966 European Indoor Games was held on 27 March in Dortmund.

== Medalists ==
Gold	Silver	Bronze
Barrie Kelly; Great Britain	Heinz Erbstößer; East Germany	Viktor Kasatkin; Soviet Union

== Results ==
=== Heats ===
First 3 from each heat (Q) and the next 3 fastest (q) qualified for the semifinals.

Rank	Heat	Name	Nationality	Time	Notes
1	1	Hans Hönger	Switzerland	6.7	Q
2	1	Jürgen Schröter	West Germany	6.8	Q
3	1	Ramón Magariños	Spain	6.8	Q
4	1	Ladislav Kříž	Czechoslovakia	6.8	q
5	1	Alfred Jungbluth	Belgium	6.9	
6	1	Klaus-Jürgen Schneider	West Germany	7.0	
1	2	Heinz Schumann	West Germany	6.8	Q
2	2	Max Barandun	Switzerland	6.8	Q
3	2	Axel Nepraunik	Austria	6.8	Q
4	2	Pasquale Giannattasio	Italy	6.9	q
5	2	Josef Čeliš	Czechoslovakia	7.0	
1	3	Viktor Kasatkin	Soviet Union	6.7	Q
2	3	Heinz Erbstößer	East Germany	6.7	Q
3	3	Barrie Kelly	Great Britain	6.7	Q
4	3	Ivica Karasi	Yugoslavia	6.8	q

=== Semifinals ===
First 3 from each heat (Q) qualified directly for the final.

Rank	Heat	Name	Nationality	Time	Notes
1	1	Heinz Erbstößer	East Germany	6.7	Q
2	1	Jürgen Schröter	West Germany	6.7	Q
3	1	Hans Hönger	Switzerland	6.7	Q
4	1	Ivica Karasi	Yugoslavia	6.8	
5	1	Ladislav Kříž	Czechoslovakia	6.8	
6	1	Axel Nepraunik	Austria	6.8	
1	2	Barrie Kelly	Great Britain	6.6	Q, WB
2	2	Viktor Kasatkin	Soviet Union	6.7	Q
3	2	Ramón Magariños	Spain	6.7	Q
4	2	Max Barandun	Switzerland	6.8	
5	2	Pasquale Giannattasio	Italy	6.8	
6	2	Heinz Schumann	West Germany	6.8	

=== Final ===
Rank	Lane	Name	Nationality	Time	Notes
1st place, gold medalist(s)	2	Barrie Kelly	Great Britain	6.6	=WB
2nd place, silver medalist(s)	6	Heinz Erbstößer	East Germany	6.6	=WB
3rd place, bronze medalist(s)	3	Viktor Kasatkin	Soviet Union	6.6	=WB
4	1	Jürgen Schröter	West Germany	6.7	
5	5	Ramón Magariños	Spain	6.8	
6	4	Hans Hönger	Switzerland	6.8	
