= Viktor Kasatkin =

Soviet sprinter (born 1942)

Personal information
- Born: 13 June 1942 (age 84)
- Height: 6 ft 2 in (188 cm)

Sport
- Country: Soviet Union; Azerbaijan
- Sport: Athletics
- Event(s): 60 metres 100 metres

Achievements and titles
- Personal bests: 60 m: 6.6 WR (1966); 100 m: 10.3 (1966)
Medal record
Men's athletics
Representing the Soviet Union
European Indoor Championships
Bronze medal – third place	1966 Dortmund	60 m
Bronze medal – third place	1967 Prague	50 m

Viktor Kasatkin (Note: Also spelled Viktor Kassatkin or Viktor Kazatkin) (Russian: Виктор Касаткин; born 13 June 1942) is a Soviet and Azerbaijani former sprinter. In 1966, he was credited with the 60 metres world record along with Barrie Kelly and Heinz Erbstößer at the inaugural European Indoor Championships. He won the bronze medal in that race, and won another bronze in the 50 metres at the 1967 edition.

== Career ==
In May 1965, Kasatkin set his 200 metres personal best of 21.4 seconds at a meet in Baku. He did not qualify for the finals of the 1965 Soviet Athletics Championships and ran only 10.6 seconds over 100 m.

That winter, Kasatkin ran the equivalent of 6.1 seconds over 60 yards. He was noted for his good start, especially surprising given his 6 feet 2 inches (1.88 m) height and the reputation of Soviet sprinters to be slower starters compared to the Americans. Soviet coach Gavriil Korobkov said he was "hopeful" for Kasatkin given given that Soviet sprinters had lagged behind America's up to that point.

In March 1966, Kasatkin entered the 60 metres at the inaugural European Athletics Indoor Championships. After running 6.7 in the quarter-finals and semi-finals, Kasatkin improved by 0.1 seconds in the finals, running 6.6 seconds alongside Barrie Kelly and Heinz Erbstößer. All three were assigned the same winning time and the 60 metres world record, though the gold medal was given to Kelly, silver to Erbstößer, and bronze to Kasatkin. After the race, Igor Ter-Ovanesyan praised his ability to accelerate but critiqued his running technique.

Outdoors in 1966, Kasatkin won the 4 × 100 m relay at the Soviet Athletics Championships. He also set his 100 metres personal best of 10.3 seconds at a meet in Odessa on 2 July. Kasatkin was named to the Soviet 100 m team at the 1966 USA–USSR Track and Field Dual Meet Series in Los Angeles later that month before it was cancelled.

In 1967, the European Indoor Championships had changed the shortest sprint distance from 60 m to 50 metres. At the championships, Kasatkin won his quarter-final with a 5.7 second-clocking and was runner-up in his semi-final. He again won the bronze medal in the finals, recording a 5.9-second time behind Pasquale Giannattasio and Aleksandr Lebedev.

== Personal life ==
Kasatkin is from Baku, Azerbaijan. He represented the Azerbaijan Soviet Socialist Republic and the Soviet Armed Forces in competition.
