= 1970 European Athletics Indoor Championships – Men's 60 metres =

The men's 60 metres event at the 1970 European Athletics Indoor Championships was held on 14 March in Vienna.

== Medalists ==
Gold	Silver	Bronze
Valeriy Borzov; Soviet Union	Zenon Nowosz; Poland	Jarkko Tapola; Finland

== Results ==
=== Heats ===
First 4 from each heat (Q) qualified directly for the semifinals.

Rank	Heat	Name	Nationality	Time	Notes
1	1	Valeriy Borzov	Soviet Union	6.7	Q
2	1	Alain Sarteur	France	6.8	Q
3	1	Jarkko Tapola	Finland	6.9	Q
4	1	Josef Čeliš	Czechoslovakia	6.9	Q
5	1	Ivica Karasi	Yugoslavia	6.9	
1	2	Horst Schiebe	West Germany	6.8	Q
2	2	Philippe Clerc	Switzerland	6.9	Q
3	2	Dimcho Arnaudov	Bulgaria	6.9	Q
4	2	Aleksandr Kornelyuk	Soviet Union	6.9	Q
5	2	Romain Roels	Belgium	6.9	
6	2	Søren Viggo Pedersen	Denmark	7.0	
1	3	Juan Carlos Jones	Spain	6.9	Q
2	3	Zenon Nowosz	Poland	6.9	Q
3	3	Philippe Guillet	France	6.9	Q
4	3	Gert Herunter	Austria	6.9	Q
5	3	Luděk Bohman	Czechoslovakia	6.9	
6	3	Claudio Cialdi	Italy	7.0	

=== Semifinals ===
First 3 from each heat (Q) qualified directly for the final.

Rank	Heat	Name	Nationality	Time	Notes
1	1	Valeriy Borzov	Soviet Union	6.7	Q
2	1	Alain Sarteur	France	6.8	Q
3	1	Juan Carlos Jones	Spain	6.8	Q
4	1	Dimcho Arnaudov	Bulgaria	6.9	
5	1	Josef Čeliš	Czechoslovakia	6.9	
6	1	Gert Herunter	Austria	6.9	
1	2	Zenon Nowosz	Poland	6.8	Q
2	2	Jarkko Tapola	Finland	6.8	Q
3	2	Philippe Guillet	France	6.8	Q
4	2	Horst Schiebe	West Germany	6.8	
5	2	Aleksandr Kornelyuk	Soviet Union	7.0	
	2	Philippe Clerc	Switzerland	DNF	

=== Final ===
Rank	Lane	Name	Nationality	Time	Notes
1st place, gold medalist(s)	2	Valeriy Borzov	Soviet Union	6.6	=WB
2nd place, silver medalist(s)	5	Zenon Nowosz	Poland	6.7	
3rd place, bronze medalist(s)	1	Jarkko Tapola	Finland	6.7	
4	3	Alain Sarteur	France	6.7	
5	6	Juan Carlos Jones	Spain	6.7	
6	4	Philippe Guillet	France	6.8	
