= 1969 European Indoor Games – Men's 50 metres =

The men's 50 metres event at the 1969 European Indoor Games was held on 8 March in Belgrade.

== Medalists ==
Gold	Silver	Bronze
Zenon Nowosz; Poland	Valeriy Borzov; Soviet Union	Bob Frith; Great Britain

== Results ==
=== Heats ===
First 2 from each heat (Q) and the next 1 fastest (q) qualified for the final.

Rank	Heat	Name	Nationality	Time	Notes
1	1	Yevgeny Sinyayev	Soviet Union	5.9	Q
2	1	Petr Utekal	Czechoslovakia	5.9	Q
3	1	Zhivko Traykov	Bulgaria	6.0	
4	1	Marian Dudziak	Poland	6.0	
5	1	Philippe Clerc	Switzerland	6.1	
1	2	Valeriy Borzov	Soviet Union	5.8	Q
2	2	Zenon Nowosz	Poland	5.8	Q
3	2	Bob Frith	Great Britain	5.9	q
4	2	Gerhard Wucherer	West Germany	5.9	
5	2	Claudio Cialdi	Italy	6.0	
6	2	Ervin Sebestyen	Romania	6.0	
1	3	Günther Gollos	East Germany	5.8	Q
2	3	Ivica Karasi	Yugoslavia	5.8	Q
3	3	Juan Carlos Jones	Spain	5.9	
4	3	Alain Vermuse	France	6.0	
5	3	Konstantin Shipokliyev	Bulgaria	6.0	
6	3	Tamás Szabó	Hungary	6.0	

=== Final ===
Rank	Name	Nationality	Time	Notes
1st place, gold medalist(s)	Zenon Nowosz	Poland	5.8	
2nd place, silver medalist(s)	Valeriy Borzov	Soviet Union	5.8	
3rd place, bronze medalist(s)	Bob Frith	Great Britain	5.8	
4	Günther Gollos	East Germany	5.9	
5	Ivica Karasi	Yugoslavia	5.9	
6	Yevgeny Sinyayev	Soviet Union	5.9	
7	Petr Utekal	Czechoslovakia	5.9	
