= Jarkko Tapola =

Finnish sprinter (born 1944)

Medal record

Men's athletics

Representing Finland

European Indoor Championships
Bronze medal – third place	1970 Vienna	60 m

Jarkko Tapola (born 5 May 1944) is a Finnish former sprinter who participated in world athletics for Finland in the late 1960s and 1970s. He competed in the 60 metres and won a bronze medal at the 1970 European Athletics Indoor Championships in Vienna, behind Valeriy Borzov and Zenon Nowosz.
