= 1967 European Indoor Games – Men's 50 metres =

The men's 50 metres event at the 1967 European Indoor Games was held on 11 and 12 March in Prague.

== Medalists ==
Gold	Silver	Bronze
Pasquale Giannattasio; Italy	Aleksandr Lebedev; Soviet Union	Viktor Kasatkin; Soviet Union

== Results ==
=== Heats ===
Held on 11 March

First 3 from each heat (Q) qualified directly for the semifinals.

Rank	Heat	Name	Nationality	Time	Notes
1	1	Gert Metz	West Germany	5.8	Q
2	1	José Luis Sánchez	Spain	5.8	Q
3	1	Petr Utekal	Czechoslovakia	5.8	Q
4	1	Gernot Assing	Austria	5.8	
5	1	Jovan Mušković	Yugoslavia	5.8	
1	2	Bob Frith	Great Britain	5.7	Q
2	2	Ladislav Kříž	Czechoslovakia	5.7	Q
3	2	Marian Dudziak	Poland	5.7	Q
4	2	Konstantin Shipokliyev	Bulgaria	5.8	
5	2	Karl-Peter Schmidtke	West Germany	5.8	
1	3	Aleksandr Lebedev	Soviet Union	5.6	Q, WB
2	3	Ennio Preatoni	Italy	5.7	Q
3	3	Hermann Burde	East Germany	5.7	Q
4	3	Tadeusz Jaworski	Poland	5.7	
5	3	Gyula Rábai	Hungary	5.8	
1	4	Viktor Kasatkin	Soviet Union	5.7	Q
2	4	Pasquale Giannattasio	Italy	5.8	Q
3	4	Günther Gollos	East Germany	5.8	Q
4	4	Søren Viggo Pedersen	Denmark	5.9	
5	4	Sonar Coşan	Turkey	6.0	

=== Semifinals ===
Held on 11 March

First 3 from each heat (Q) qualified directly for the final.

Rank	Heat	Name	Nationality	Time	Notes
1	1	Günther Gollos	East Germany	5.6	Q, =WB
2	1	Aleksandr Lebedev	Soviet Union	5.7	Q
3	1	José Luis Sánchez	Spain	5.7	Q
4	1	Ladislav Kříž	Czechoslovakia	5.7	
5	1	Ennio Preatoni	Italy	5.8	
6	1	Gert Metz	West Germany	5.8	
1	2	Pasquale Giannattasio	Italy	5.8	Q
2	2	Viktor Kasatkin	Soviet Union	5.8	Q
3	2	Marian Dudziak	Poland	5.8	Q
4	2	Bob Frith	Great Britain	5.9	
5	2	Petr Utekal	Czechoslovakia	5.9	
6	2	Hermann Burde	East Germany	5.9	

=== Final ===
Held on 12 March

Rank	Lane	Name	Nationality	Time	Notes
1st place, gold medalist(s)	5	Pasquale Giannattasio	Italy	5.7	
2nd place, silver medalist(s)	4	Aleksandr Lebedev	Soviet Union	5.8	
3rd place, bronze medalist(s)	6	Viktor Kasatkin	Soviet Union	5.9	
4	3	Günther Gollos	East Germany	6.0	
5	2	Marian Dudziak	Poland	6.0	
	1	José Luis Sánchez	Spain	DNS	
