= Tapola =

Tapola is a Finnish surname. Notable people with the surname include:

- Jarkko Tapola (born 1944), Finnish sprinter
- Jussi Tapola (born 1974), Finnish ice hockey coach
- Mervi Tapola (1954–2019), heiress
