= 1969 European Athletics Championships – Men's 200 metres =

Men's 200 metres at the 1969 European Athletics Championships
- Venue: Georgios Karaiskakis Stadium
- Location: Athens
- Dates: 18 September (heats); 19 September (semi-finals); 20 September (final)
- Competitors: 21 from 17 nations
- Winning time: 20.70

Medalists
gold medal	Philippe Clerc	Switzerland
silver medal	Hermann Burde	East Germany
bronze medal	Zenon Nowosz	Poland

The men's 200 metres at the 1969 European Athletics Championships was held in Athens, Greece, at Georgios Karaiskakis Stadium on 18, 19, and 20 September 1969.

== Participation ==
According to an unofficial count, 21 athletes from 17 countries participated in the event.

- Austria (1)
- Bulgaria (1)
- Czechoslovakia (3)
- East Germany (2)
- Finland (1)
- France (1)
- Great Britain (1)
- Greece (1)
- Hungary (1)
- Italy (1)
- Luxembourg (1)
- Norway (1)
- Poland (1)
- Portugal (1)
- Soviet Union (1)
- Switzerland (2)
- Yugoslavia (1)

== Results ==
=== Heats ===
18 September

==== Heat 1 ====
Rank	Name	Nationality	Time	Notes
1	Ladislav Kříž	Czechoslovakia	21.4	Q
2	Predrag Križan	Yugoslavia	21.6	Q
3	Philippe Clerc	Switzerland	21.7	Q
4	Barcelo de Carvalho	Portugal	21.8	Q
5	Emile Jung	Luxembourg	22.2	
			Wind: -2.3 m/s	

==== Heat 2 ====
Rank	Name	Nationality	Time	Notes
1	Pasqualino Abeti	Italy	21.4	Q
2	Hansruedi Wiedmer	Switzerland	21.4	Q
3	Jiří Kynos	Czechoslovakia	21.4	Q
4	Dave Dear	Great Britain	21.6	Q
5	Georgios Mikelidis	Greece	21.8	
6	Trendafil Terziyski	Bulgaria	21.8	
			Wind: -4.5 m/s	

==== Heat 3 ====
Rank	Name	Nationality	Time	Notes
1	Nikolay Ivanov	Soviet Union	21.6	Q
2	Axel Nepraunik	Austria	21.7	Q
3	Hermann Burde	East Germany	21.7	Q
4	László Mihályfi	Hungary	21.8	Q
5	Ole Bernt Skarstein	Norway	21.9	
			Wind: -2.8 m/s	

==== Heat 4 ====
Rank	Name	Nationality	Time	Notes
1	Zenon Nowosz	Poland	21.2	Q
2	Philippe Guillet	France	21.3	Q
3	Hans-Jürgen Bombach	East Germany	21.3	Q
4	Luděk Bohman	Czechoslovakia	21.4	Q
5	Ossi Karttunen	Finland	21.4	
			Wind: -2.8 m/s	

=== Semi-finals ===
19 September

==== Heat 1 ====
Rank	Name	Nationality	Time	Notes
1	Philippe Clerc	Switzerland	20.9	Q
2	Zenon Nowosz	Poland	20.9	Q
3	Hermann Burde	East Germany	21.0	Q
4	Pasqualino Abeti	Italy	21.1	Q
5	Luděk Bohman	Czechoslovakia	21.1	
6	Predrag Križan	Yugoslavia	21.2	
7	Ladislav Kříž	Czechoslovakia	21.3	
8	László Mihályfi	Hungary	21.5	
			Wind: -1.2 m/s	

==== Heat 2 ====
Rank	Name	Nationality	Time	Notes
1	Hans-Jürgen Bombach	East Germany	21.2	Q
2	Jiří Kynos	Czechoslovakia	21.2	Q
3	Philippe Guillet	France	21.2	Q
4	Hansruedi Wiedmer	Switzerland	21.4	Q
5	Axel Nepraunik	Austria	21.5	
6	Dave Dear	Great Britain	21.5	
7	Nikolay Ivanov	Soviet Union	21.6	
	Barcelo de Carvalho	Portugal	DNS	
			Wind: -1.8 m/s	

=== Final ===
20 September

Rank	Name	Nationality	Time	Notes
1st place, gold medalist(s)	Philippe Clerc	Switzerland	20.70	CR
2nd place, silver medalist(s)	Hermann Burde	East Germany	20.94	
3rd place, bronze medalist(s)	Zenon Nowosz	Poland	20.96	
4	Hans-Jürgen Bombach	East Germany	21.07	
5	Jiří Kynos	Czechoslovakia	21.09	
6	Hansruedi Wiedmer	Switzerland	21.14	
7	Pasqualino Abeti	Italy	21.18	
8	Philippe Guillet	France	21.22	
			Wind: 0.0 m/s	
