= Konstantinos Kosmopoulos =

Greek politician (1928–2011)

Konstantinos Kosmopoulos (Greek: Κωνσταντίνος Κοσμόπουλος; 1928 – February 12, 2011) was a Greek politician who served as the Mayor of Thessaloniki, Greece's second largest city, from 1989 to 1998. He was succeeded in office by Vasilis Papageorgopoulos.

Kosmopoulos died on February 12 2011, of a cardiac arrest at the age of 83.
