= Ben Johnson (American sprinter) =

American track athlete (1914–1992)

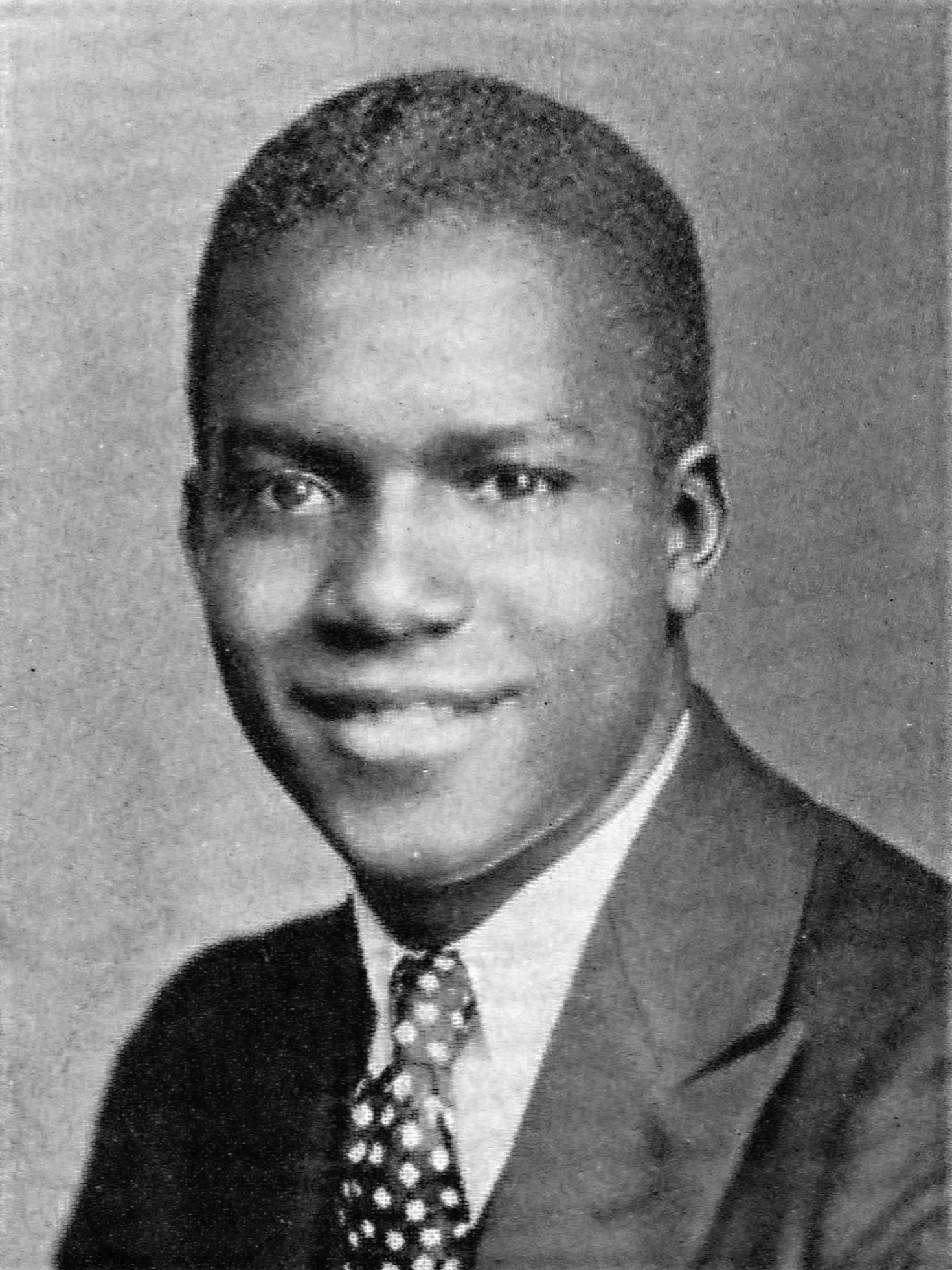
- Johnson in 1933

Personal information
- Born: Benjamin Washington Johnson; 1914 Virginia, US
- Died: 1992 (aged 77–78)
- Height: 5 ft 7 in (1.70 m)
- Weight: 150 lb (68 kg)

Benjamin Washington Johnson (1914–1992) was an American sprinter who was considered a serious rival to Olympic gold medalist Jesse Owens. Known as the "Columbia Comet", Johnson was the United States champion at 100 yards in 1938, but injuries and the outbreak of the Second World War denied him a chance to compete in the Olympics.

In later life he became one of the first African-Americans to attain the rank of colonel in the United States Army.

== Early life ==
Ben Johnson was born in Hamilton, Cumberland County, Virginia, on July 24, 1914. His mother, Ellen Washington, was the great-aunt of actor Denzel Washington. According to the 1915 New York Census, he and his parents were living at 788 Union Street, Brooklyn in an apartment above the horse stable where Johnson’s father worked. By 1920, Johnson and his family had moved back to Hamilton. After his father died, Johnson moved with his mother first to Lower Merion, Pennsylvania, and then, about 1929, to Plymouth, Pennsylvania. He attended Plymouth High School (aka Ward P. Davenport High School), where, beginning in his freshman year, he was a member of the track and field team. In May 1930, he and his teammates competed in the Pennsylvania state finals at Altoona, Pennsylvania, where Johnson placed third in the 220 yard dash. Johnson continued his track success as a junior, breaking state records in the 100 and 220 yard dash. He was invited to compete in the 1932 United States Olympic Trials in California, but initially declined because of the cost of travel. Local residents raised the necessary funds to pay for the trip, calling it the "Ben Johnson Olympic Fund," but at the trials, Johnson was eliminated in the 200 meter heats.

== College track career ==
After graduating from Plymouth High School, Johnson entered Columbia University, where he majored in political science, while competing as a member of the Columbia Lions track team.

During the 1935 season, Johnson won the AAU indoor title at 60 meters, equaling Jesse Owens's world best time of 6.6 seconds set earlier in the day. However, injury curtailed the remainder of the season.

In 1936, the Olympic year, he was injured in the AAU Championships a week before the Olympic Trials.

In 1937 at the National Association of Intercollegiate Athletics (NAIA) outdoor championships, Johnson, now known by the moniker "The Columbia Comet", won titles as 100 yards, 220 yards, and the long jump - the first athlete in the twentieth century to do so., That year he also won the NCAA 220 yard title.

In 1938, at the Millrose Games, he won the 60 yard title in a reputed new world's best time of 6.0 seconds. However, the time was not accepted and so he had to be content with being credited with a time of 6.1 s, simply equaling the world's best time up to that point. In 1938, he also claimed his third AAU indoor title at 60 yards, having won previously in 1935 and 1937.

Johnson won the 100 yards in the AAU (USA National Track and Field) Championships in 1938. In the AAU championships, he was also 6th in 1936, 2nd in 1937 and 5th in 1939. As a result of such runs, in the 1938 season he was considered the world's pre-eminent sprinter. His season was curtailed unfortunately by him suffering from a bout of measles.

== Later life ==
After graduation from college, Johnson taught at the Bordertown Manual Training School, in Bordentown, New Jersey.

He joined the United States Army in 1942, eventually reaching the rank of Colonel—one of the first African-Americans to do so. He left the army in 1968 to resume his education, earning a master's degree from Maryland University.

Afterwards, Johnson lived at Harrisburg, Pennsylvania where he worked as a bureau director for the Pennsylvania Department of Public Welfare, heading the department's affirmative action program. He died on December 17, 1992, and was buried in Arlington National Cemetery. His only child, Norbert Carl Benjamin Johnson, had died earlier that year. He is survived by his granddaughter Lauren Johnson.

== Accolades and awards ==
- In 1971, Johnson was elected a member of the inaugural class of the Wyoming Valley Sports Hall of Fame.
- In 1985, Johnson was inducted into the inaugural class of the Luzerne County Sports Hall of Fame.
- In 2006, Ben Johnson was a member of the inaugural class of the Columbia University Athletics Hall of Fame.

== Gallery ==
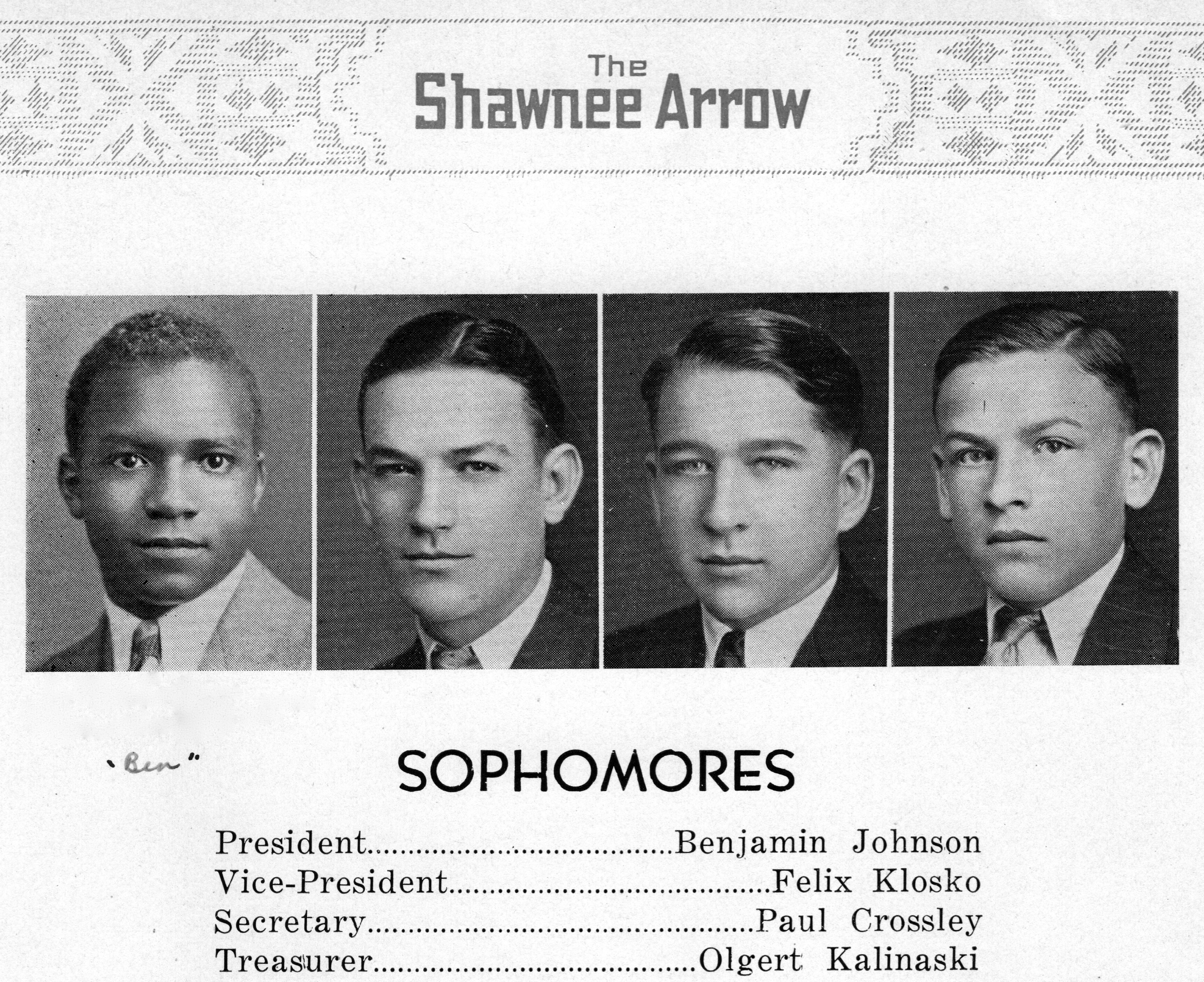
Ben Johnson, 1931, President Sophomore Class, Plymouth High School, Plymouth, Pennsylvania.

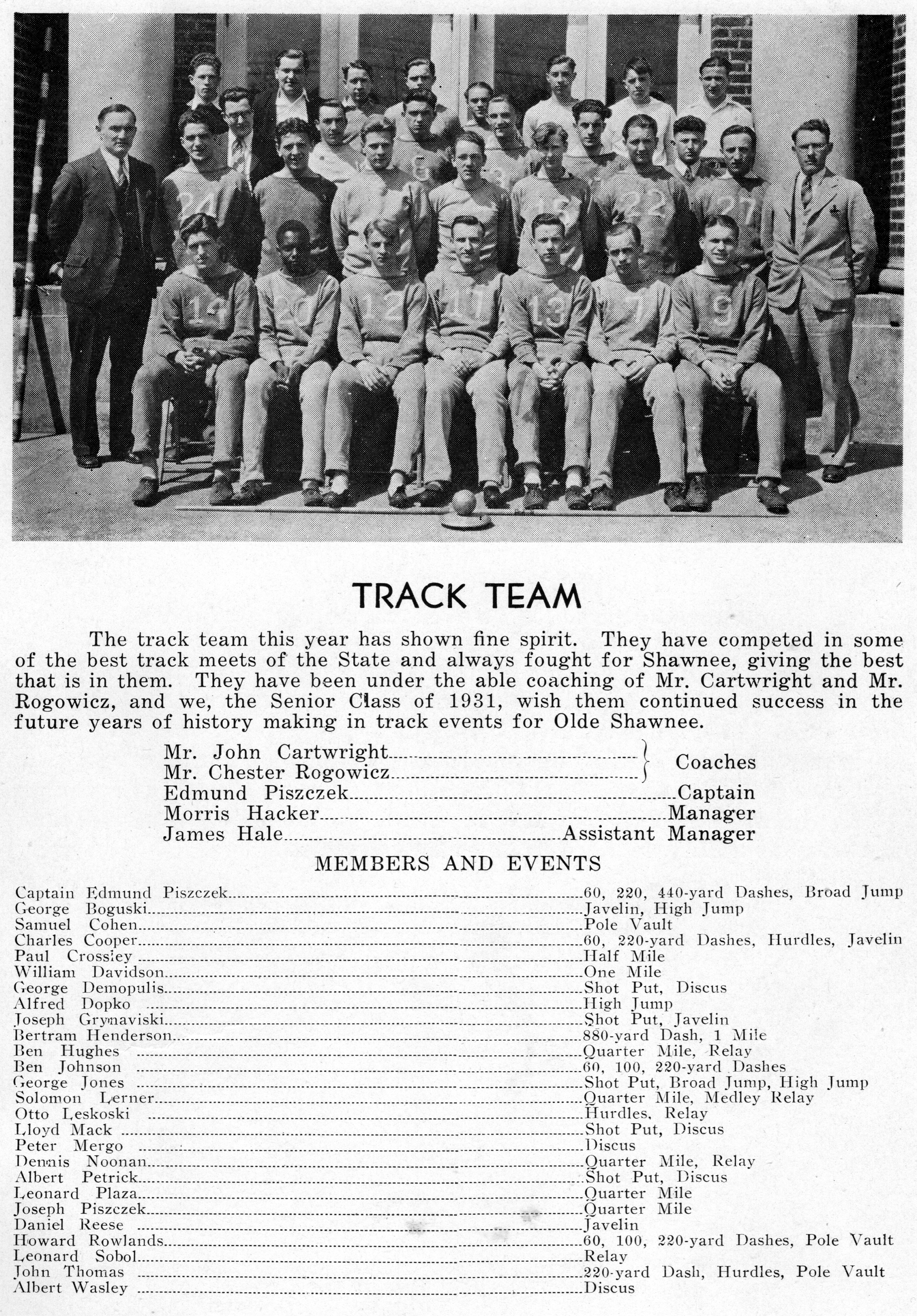
Ben Johnson, Front Row No. 20, Plymouth High School, Plymouth, Pennsylvania, Track Team 1931.

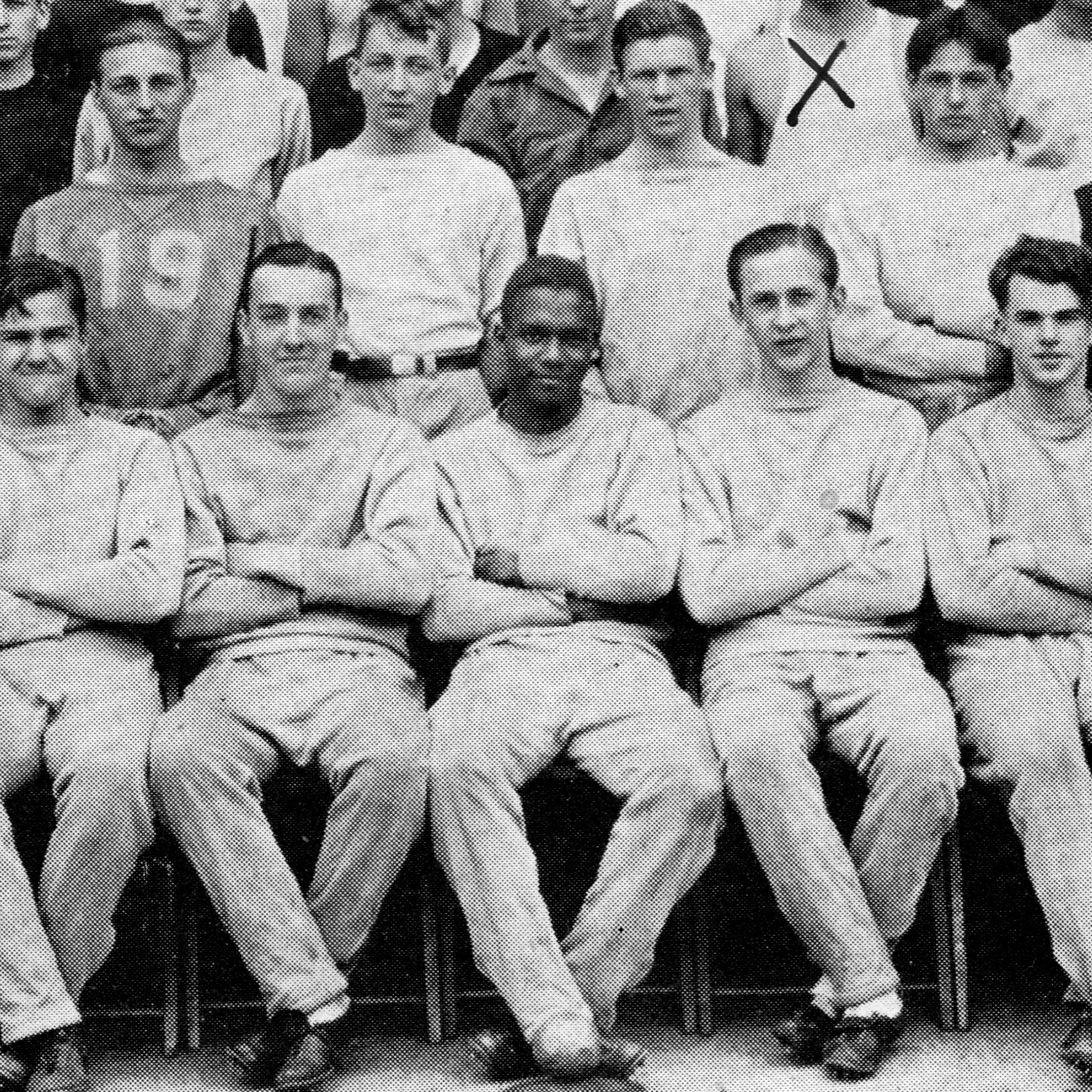
Ben Johnson, Captain of Track Team, Plymouth High School, 1933.
