= Zenon Nowosz =

Polish sprinter (born 1944)

Personal information
- Born: 6 February 1944 (age 82) Warsaw, Poland
- Height: 1.83 m (6 ft 0 in)
- Weight: 72 kg (159 lb)

Sport
- Sport: Track and field
- Club: Legia Warsaw
Medal record
Representing Poland
European Championships
Gold medal – first place	1978 Prague	4×100 m
Silver medal – second place	1971 Helsinki	4×100 m
Bronze medal – third place	1969 Athens	200 m
European Indoor Championships
Gold medal – first place	1969 Belgrade	50 m
Gold medal – first place	1973 Rottherdam	60 m
Silver medal – second place	1970 Vienna	60 m
Summer Universiade
Gold medal – first place	1970 Turin	4x100m relay

Zenon Stanisław Nowosz (born 6 February 1944) is a Polish sprinter who participated in world athletics for Poland in the late 1960s and 1970s. He competed in the 60 metres, 100 metres and 200 metres.

Nowosz won a bronze medal at the 1969 European Championships in Athletics in Athens in 200 metres. At the 1971 Championships in Helsinki he won a silver medal in 4 × 100 metres relay. He became a European Champion at 1978 Championships in Prague in 4 × 100 metres relay.

He also won a silver medal in Vienna in 60 metres at the 1970 European Indoor Championships in Athletics, behind winner Valeriy Borzov. At the same distance he won a gold medal at 1973 Championships in Rotterdam.

Nowosz participated in three Olympic Games: in 1968 Mexico City, 1972 Munich and 1976 Montreal.

== International competitions ==
Year	Competition	Venue	Position	Event	Notes
Representing Poland
1968	Olympic Games	Mexico City, Mexico	39th (h)	100 m	10.57
1968	Olympic Games	Mexico City, Mexico	8th	4 × 100 m relay	39.22
1969	European Indoor Games	Belgrade, Yugoslavia	1st	50 m	5.8
1969	European Championships	Athens, Greece	8th (sf)	100 m	10.6
1969	European Championships	Athens, Greece	3rd	200 m	20.96
1969	European Championships	Athens, Greece	4th	4 × 100 m relay	39.55
1970	European Indoor Championships	Vienna, Austria	2nd	60 m	6.7
1970	European Cup Final	Stockholm, Sweden	1st	100 m	10.4
1970	European Cup Final	Stockholm, Sweden	3rd	200 m	21.0
1970	European Cup Final	Stockholm, Sweden	2nd	4 × 100 m relay	39.5
1970	Universiade	Turin, Italy	4th	100 m	10.6
1970	Universiade	Turin, Italy	1st	4 × 100 m relay	39.2
1971	European Indoor Championships	Sofia, Bulgaria	9th (sf)	60 m	6.9
1971	European Championships	Helsinki, Finland	5th	100 m	10.66
1971	European Championships	Helsinki, Finland	16th (sf)	200 m	21.56
1971	European Championships	Helsinki, Finland	2nd	4 × 100 m relay	39.72
1972	Olympic Games	Munich, West Germany	7th	100 m	10.46
1972	Olympic Games	Munich, West Germany	6th	4 × 100 m relay	39.03
1973	European Indoor Championships	Rotterdam, Netherlands	1st	60 m	6.64
1974	European Indoor Championships	Gothenburg, Sweden	6th	60 m	6.70
1974	European Championships	Rome, Italy	15th (sf)	100 m	10.61
1974	European Championships	Rome, Italy	24th (h)	200 m	21.67
1974	European Championships	Rome, Italy	5th	4 × 100 m relay	39.35
1975	European Cup Final	Nice, France	5th	4 × 100 m relay	39.60
1976	European Indoor Championships	Munich, West Germany	6th	60 m	6.79
1976	Olympic Games	Montreal, Canada	19th (qf)	200 m	21.22
1977	European Cup "A" Final	Helsinki, Finland	3rd	4 × 100 m relay	39.38
1978	European Championships	Prague, Czechoslovakia	1st	4 × 100 m relay	38.58

== Personal bests ==
Outdoor

- 100 metres – 10.35 (Warsaw 1975)
- 200 metres – 20.88 (Dortmund 1972)

Indoor

- 60 metres – 6.52 (Zabrze 1973)
