= Gilles Échevin =

French sprinter

Personal information
- Born: 1 September 1948 (age 78) Bouillante, Guadeloupe
- Height: 172 cm (5 ft 8 in)
- Weight: 72 kg (159 lb)

Sport
- Country: France
- Sport: Athletics

Gilles Échevin (born 1 September 1948 in Bouillante, Guadeloupe) is a French athlete who specialises in the 100 meters. Echevin competed in the men's 100 meters at the 1976 Summer Olympics.
