= Hansruedi Wiedmer =

Swiss sprinter (born 1945)

Personal information
- Nationality: Swiss
- Born: 8 September 1945 (age 81)

Sport
- Sport: Sprinting
- Event: 100 metres

Hansruedi Wiedmer (born 8 September 1945) is a Swiss sprinter. He competed in the men's 100 metres at the 1968 Summer Olympics.
