= Raymond Heerenveen =

Dutch Antillean/Dutch sprinter

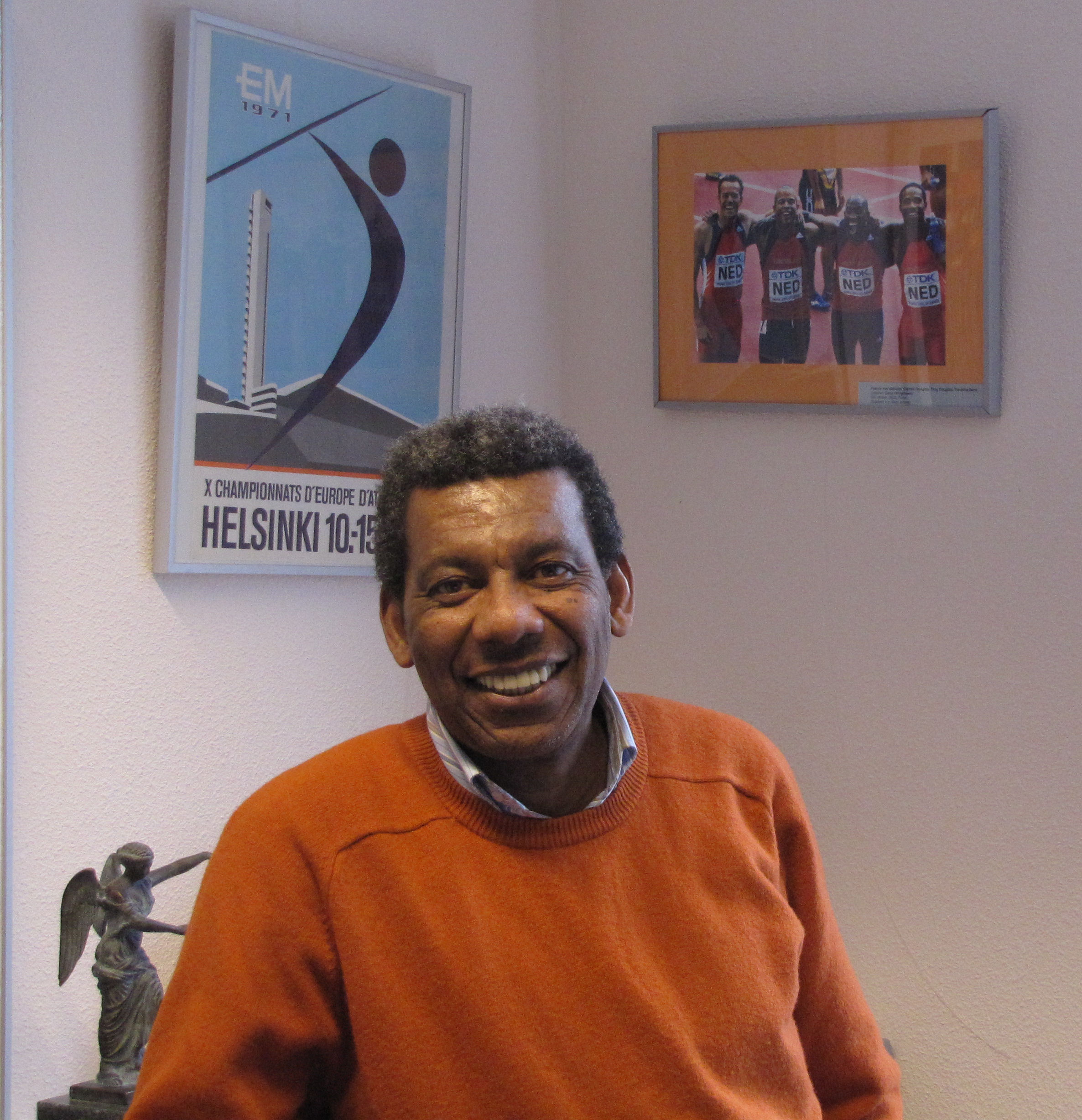
- Raymond Heerenveen in 2010

Personal information
- Born: 9 November 1948 (age 77) Curaçao
- Height: 1.76 m (5 ft 9 in)
- Weight: 62 kg (137 lb)

Sport
- Sport: Sprint
- Club: PEC, Zwolle

Raymond Alfred Heerenveen (born 9 November 1948) is a retired Dutch Antillean/Dutch sprinter. He competed at the 1976 Summer Olympics in the 400 metres event, but failed to reach the final.

== Biography ==
In 1968 Heerenveen moved from Curaçao to the Netherlands to study at the Technical College in Zwolle. He then played volleyball and some baseball. While studying in the Netherlands Heerenveen married a Dutch woman and consequently was granted permission to remain in the country until 1975. In 1971 he started training in athletics and ran the 100 metres in 10.9 seconds. Already by 1973 he was selected for the 60 metres event at the European Championships.

In 1974 he won the national title in the 60 metres and 200 metres and finished second in the 100 metres. The same year, he was part of the Dutch 4 × 400 metres relay team that finished fifth at the European Championships. In 1975 he won a national title in the 50 metres event, which was held only once in the Dutch history, and set a new national record in the 400 metres (46.33).

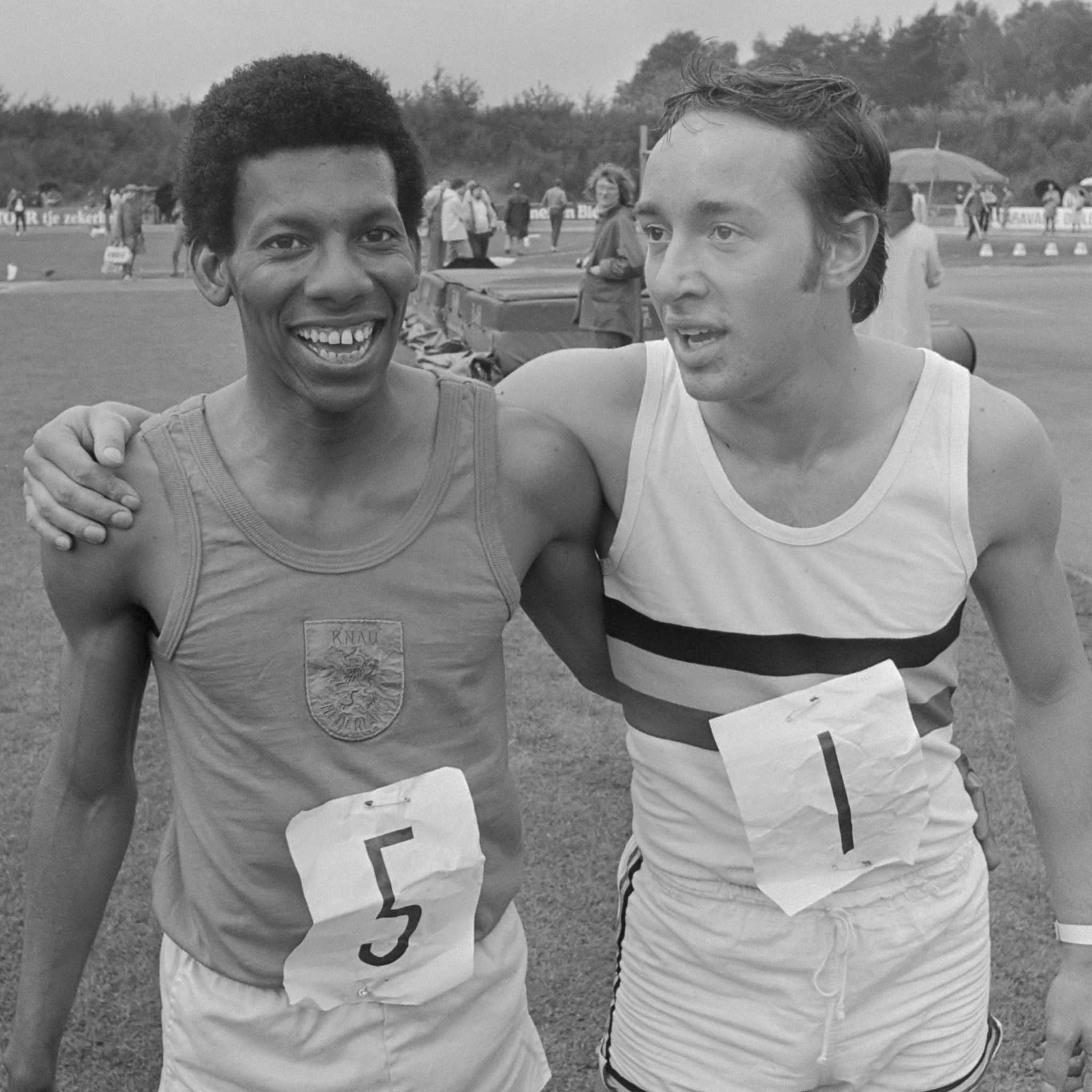
Raymond Heerenveen (left) with the Belgian Lambert Micha, first and second in the 200 metres at the Netherlands-Belgium-West Germany B meet at Papendal in 1974.

After leaving the Netherlands in 1975, Heerenveen competed for the Netherlands Antilles at the 1976 Summer Olympics and 1975 Pan American Games, where he finished seventh in the 200 metres. Since 1977 he was allowed to train and compete in the Netherlands, and already in the next year he won three national sprint titles. He planned to compete for the Netherlands at the 1980 Summer Olympics, and was selected for the national 4 × 400 metres relay team, but had to withdraw due to the rule set by the International Olympic Committee. The rule stated that an athlete may not compete for two different countries in the consecutive Games.

In 1981, after losing the 60 metres, 100 meteres and 200 metres Dutch titles (he finished in second-third place in all events), Heerenveen retired from competitions to focus on his family and two daughters. For the next 16 years he worked as electrical engineer in the Netherlands.
