= Dorel Cristudor =

Romanian sprinter and bobsledder

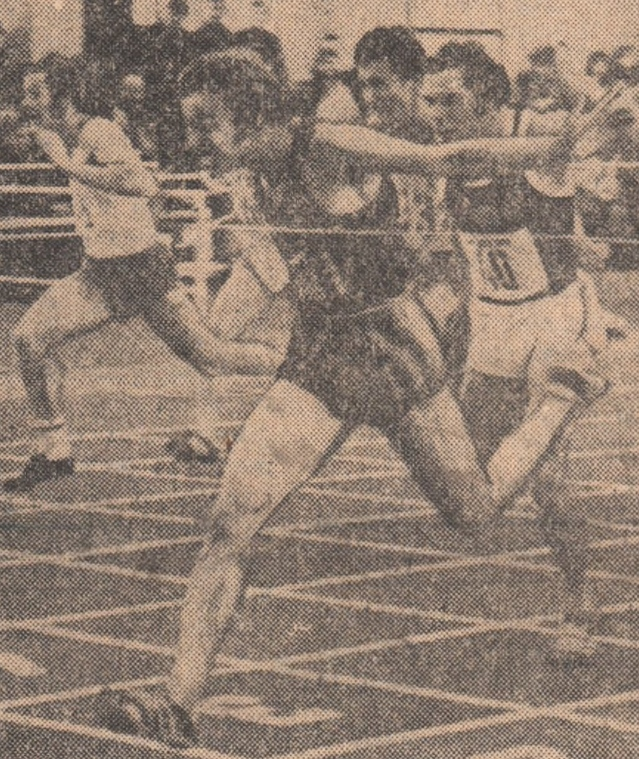
- Cristudor in 1974

Personal information
- Nationality: Romanian
- Born: 11 April 1954 (age 71)

Sport
- Sport: Bobsleigh

Dorel Cristudor (born 11 April 1954) is a Romanian former sprinter turned bobsledder. He competed in the four man event at the 1980 Winter Olympics.
