= Bjarni Stefánsson =

Icelandic sprinter (born 1950)

Personal information
- Nationality: Icelandic
- Born: 2 December 1950 (age 75)

Sport
- Sport: Sprinting
- Event: 100 metres

Bjarni Stefánsson (born 2 December 1950) is an Icelandic sprinter. He competed in the 100 metres at the 1972 Summer Olympics and the 1976 Summer Olympics.
