= Manuel Carballo (athlete) =

Spanish sprinter

Personal information
- Nationality: Spanish
- Born: 10 March 1948 (age 78)

Sport
- Sport: Sprinting
- Event: 4 × 100 metres relay

Achievements and titles
- Olympic finals: 1972 Summer Olympics

Manuel Carballo (born 10 March 1948) is a Spanish sprinter. He competed in the men's 4 × 100 metres relay at the 1972 Summer Olympics.
