= Vasilis Papageorgopoulos =

Greek sprinter and Mayor of Thessaloniki

- Βασίλης Παπαγεωργόπουλος
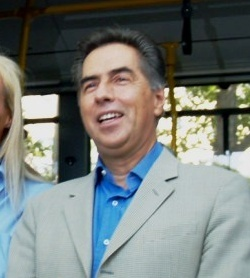
- Papageorgopoulos in 2009

59th Mayor of Thessaloniki
- In office 1 January 1999 – 31 December 2010
- Preceded by: Dimitris Dimitriadis
- Succeeded by: Yiannis Boutaris

Deputy Minister of Culture
- In office 1991–1992
- Prime Minister: Konstantinos Mitsotakis

Member of the Hellenic Parliament
- In office 1981–1998
- Constituency: Thessaloniki A

Personal details
- Born: 27 June 1947 (age 79) Thessaloniki, Greece
- Party: New Democracy
- Spouse: Eleni Papageorgopoulou
- Education: Aristotle University of Thessaloniki
- Profession: Politician; Dentist
- Sports career
Medal record
Men's athletics
Representing Greece
European Championships
Bronze medal – third place	1971 Helsinki	100 m
European Indoor Championships
Silver medal – second place	1976 Munich	60 m
Bronze medal – third place	1972 Grenoble	50 m

Vasilis Papageorgopoulos (Greek: Βασίλης Παπαγεωργόπουλος; born 27 June 1947) is a retired Greek sprinter, former mayor of Thessaloniki. He competed at two Olympic Games in 1972 and 1976.

== Biography ==
In addition to his two Olympic appearances, Papageorgopoulos won two medals at the European Indoor Championships as well as the bronze medal in the 100 metres at the 1971 European Championships in Athletics. He was named the 1971 Greek Athlete of the Year. His personal best in 100 metres was 10.22 seconds, achieved in August 1972 in İzmir. This ranks him twelfth among Greek 100 metre sprinters.

Papageorgopoulos won the British AAA Championships title in the 100 metres event at the 1972 AAA Championships.

He also studied medicine. Papageorgopoulos first got involved in politics in 1978 when he was elected City councilor of Thessaloniki. He practiced dentistry until 1981, when he was elected as a member of the Greek Parliament, representing Thessaloniki, for the Conservative New Democracy party. From 1 January 1999 to 31 December 2010, Papageorgopoulos was the mayor of Thessaloniki.

== Corruption charges ==
In April 2011, he was among 25 people contacted by an investigating magistrate with a probe into alleged embezzlement of 51.4 million euros of the municipality. He was also accused by his successor Yiannis Boutaris of providing inaccurate financial figures. In February 2013, he was found guilty and sentenced to life imprisonment for embezzling 17.9 million euro of the Municipality of Thessaloniki while he was mayor. In July 2014, the sentence was reduced to a maximum of 20 years after an appeals court in Thessaloniki ruled that Papageorgopoulos's crimes amounted to acting as "accessory to the stealing of municipal funds while in office.” In July 2015 Papageorgopoulos was granted parole due to health problems.

== Honours ==
Year	Competition	Venue	Position	Event	Notes
1971	European Indoor Championships	Sofia, Bulgaria	5th	60 m	
1971	European Championships	Helsinki, Finland	3rd	100 m	10.56 s
1971	Mediterranean Games	İzmir, Turkey	1st	100 m	10.4 s
1972	European Indoor Championships	Grenoble, France	3rd	50 m	5.82 s
1972	Olympic Games	Munich, West Germany	(sf)*	100 m	DNS
1974	European Indoor Championships	Gothenburg, Sweden	8th	60 m	
1974	European Championships	Rome, Italy	9th (sf)	100 m	10.44 s
1975	Mediterranean Games	Algiers, Algeria	2nd	100 metres	
1976	European Indoor Championships	Munich, West Germany	2nd	60 metres	6.67 s

- At the 1972 Summer Olympics he was forced to scratch from the semi-finals after he had pulled a groin muscle in the quarter-finals.

Records
Preceded by (East Germany) Manfred Kokot	European Record Holder Men's 100 m 3 June 1972 – 16 June 1972	Succeeded by (Italy) Pietro Mennea
Preceded by Konstantinos Kosmopoulos	Mayor of Thessaloniki; 1999 and 2010	Succeeded by Yiannis Boutaris
