= Valeriy Borzov =

Soviet-Ukrainian former sprinter and politician

- Валерій Борзов
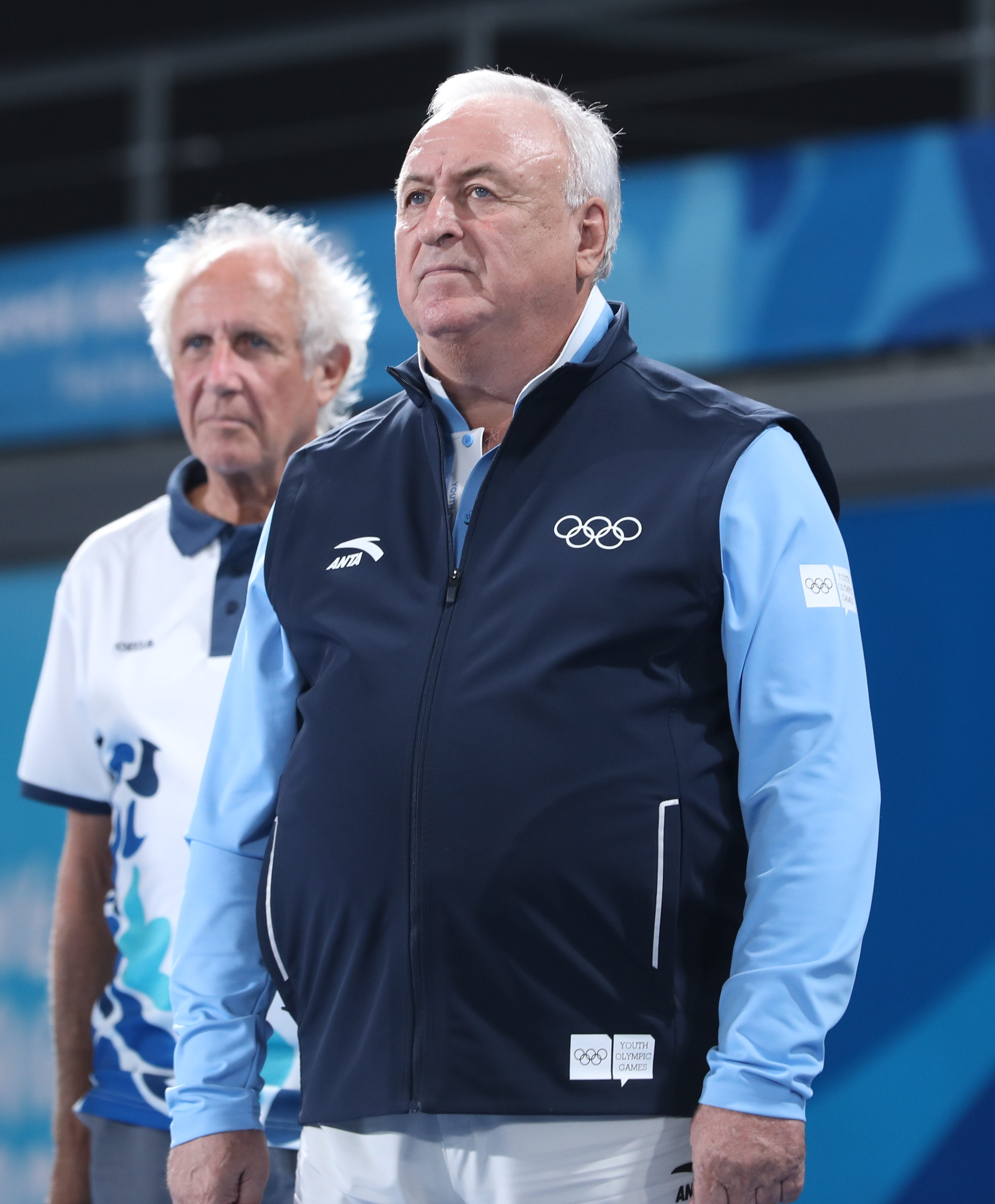
- Borzov at the 2018 Youth Olympics

People's Deputy of Ukraine
- In office 20 May 2003 – 25 May 2006
- Constituency: Social Democratic Party of Ukraine (united), No. 26
- In office 12 May 1998 – 15 May 2002
- Constituency: People's Movement of Ukraine, No. 35

Head of the State Committee of Youth, Fitness and Sport
- In office 30 July 1990 – 6 June 1991
- Prime Minister: Vitaliy Masol; Vitold Fokin
- Preceded by: Mykhailo Baka
- Succeeded by: Position abolished Himself as Minister of Youth and Sport of Ukraine

President of NOC Ukraine
- In office 1990–1998
- Preceded by: Position established
- Succeeded by: Ivan Fedorenko

Minister of Youth and Sport
- In office 6 June 1991 – 20 August 1996
- President: Leonid Kravchuk; Leonid Kuchma
- Prime Minister: Vitold Fokin; Leonid Kuchma; Vitaliy Masol; Yevhen Marchuk; Pavlo Lazarenko
- Preceded by: Position established Himself as head of the State Committee of Youth, Fitness and Sport
- Succeeded by: Position abolished Himself as head of the State Committee of Fitness and Sport

Head of the State Committee of Fitness and Sport
- In office 20 August 1996 – 26 August 1997
- President: Leonid Kuchma
- Prime Minister: Pavlo Lazarenko; Valeriy Pustovoitenko
- Preceded by: Position abolished Himself as Minister of Youth and Sport
- Succeeded by: Suzanna Stanik

Personal details
- Born: 20 October 1949 (age 76) Sambir, Ukrainian SSR, Soviet Union (now Ukraine)
- Party: Communist Party of the Soviet Union (1972–1991); People's Movement of Ukraine (1998-2003); SDPU(u) (2003–?)
- Other political affiliations: Hromada; Batkivshchyna
- Spouse: Ludmilla Tourischeva (1977)
- Children: Tetyana (1978)

Valeriy Borzov
Medal record

Men's athletics

Representing the Soviet Union

Olympic Games
| Gold medal – first place | 1972 Munich | 100 m |
| Gold medal – first place | 1972 Munich | 200 m |
| Silver medal – second place | 1972 Munich | 4 × 100 m relay |
| Bronze medal – third place | 1976 Montreal | 100 m |
| Bronze medal – third place | 1976 Montreal | 4 × 100 m relay |

European Championships
| Gold medal – first place | 1969 Athens | 100 m |
| Gold medal – first place | 1971 Helsinki | 100 m |
| Gold medal – first place | 1971 Helsinki | 200 m |
| Gold medal – first place | 1974 Rome | 100 m |
| Silver medal – second place | 1969 Athens | 4 × 100 m relay |

European Indoor Championships
| Gold medal – first place | 1970 Vienna | 60 m |
| Gold medal – first place | 1971 Sofia | 60 m |
| Gold medal – first place | 1972 Grenoble | 50 m |
| Gold medal – first place | 1974 Gothenburg | 60 m |
| Gold medal – first place | 1975 Katowice | 60 m |
| Gold medal – first place | 1976 Munich | 60 m |
| Gold medal – first place | 1977 San Sebastián | 60 m |
| Silver medal – second place | 1969 Belgrade | 50 m |

Valeriy Pylypovych Borzov (Ukrainian: Валерій Пилипович Борзов; Russian: Валерий Филиппович Борзов, romanized: Valeriy Filippovich Borzov; born 20 October 1949) is a Soviet-Ukrainian former sprinter and politician. He is a two-time Olympian, a former president of the National Olympic Committee of Ukraine, and Minister for Youth and Sports of Ukraine.

In 1972, he won the 100 and 200 metres sprint events at the Olympic Games in Munich.

== Career ==
Valeriy Borzov was born in Sambir, Drohobych Oblast, Ukrainian SSR, Soviet Union, Borzov started his track and field career in 1968. He became a household name in the Track and Field circles after having won the sprint-double at the 1971 European Championships in Helsinki. He had already won the 100 m championship in 1969, when he equalled Armin Hary's nine-year-old European record of 10.0 seconds.

At the 1972 Munich Olympics, two American favourites and world record holders, Eddie Hart and Rey Robinson, missed the 100 m quarterfinals due to a misunderstanding about the starting time of the heats. Coincidentally Borzov almost missed his own quarter-final as well, having fallen asleep in the stadium, his coach waking him up just as the race was about to start. Borzov won the 100 m sprint with relative ease in a time of 10.14 seconds. Borzov then won the 200 m in great style. The picture, featuring Borzov winning the 200 m heats at the 1972 Summer Olympics was selected for the Voyager Golden Record and later launched into space aboard two Voyager spacecraft in 1977. He also won silver as part of the Soviet 4 × 100 relay team, leaving Munich with three medals and the title of the fastest human in the world.

Between the 1972 and the 1976 Olympics, Borzov spent more time on his studies and soccer. Still, this did not stop him from winning his third successive 100 m title at the European Championships in 1974. At the 1976 Montreal Olympics, he finished third in the 100 m race behind Caribbean sprinters Hasley Crawford and Donald Quarrie, in a time of 10.14, his fourth Olympic medal. In the 4 × 100 m relay, his team won another bronze.

A persisting injury forced Borzov to abandon his hopes to participate in his third Olympic Games. He ended his career in 1979. He married Ludmilla Tourischeva, a four-time Olympic champion in gymnastics, in 1977.

== Political career ==
Borzov's political career started during the 1970s as a member of the Komsomol of Ukraine. In 1980–1986 he was one of the secretaries of the Central Committee of the Ukrainian Komsomol. From 1991 to 1998, Borzov served as the president of the Ukrainian Olympic Committee. He has been a member of the International Olympic Committee since 1994. He has also held a Youth and Sports cabinet minister position with the Government of Ukraine from 1990 till 1997. From 1998 until 2006, he was a member of the Ukrainian parliament.

Soon after being elected to the party list for People's Movement of Ukraine (commonly abbreviated as Rukh) in 1998 he changed from the Rukh faction to the faction "Reforms Center" in 1998–1999. Yet after dissolution of the parliamentary faction of Hromada, in 1999 Borzov became one of the first who joined the newly created parliamentary faction Batkivshchyna in Verkhovna Rada, with which he stayed almost to the end of the third parliamentary convocation. In 2001, Borzov joined the Social Democratic Party of Ukraine (united). He stayed with the same party for the next elections in 2002, and eventually became a member in 2003.

== Gallery ==
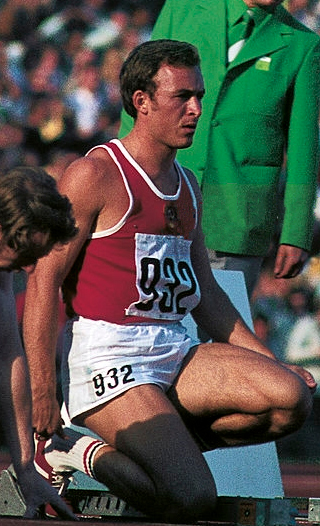
Borzov at the 1972 Olympics

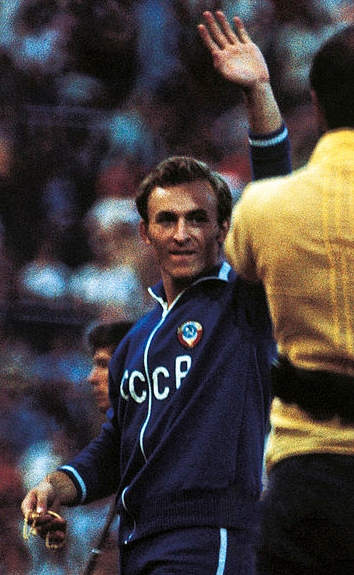
Borzov with a gold medal in 1972

== Bibliography ==
- Valeriy Borzov (1982). 10 Seconds – The Whole Life (in Russian). Moscow: Fizkultura i sport. Archived from the original on 2007-07-07.

Political offices
| Preceded by Himself as State Committee of Youth, Physical Culture and Sports | Chairman of the Ministry of Youth Affairs and Spors; 1991-1996 | Succeeded by Himself as State Committee on Physical Culture and Sports |
| Preceded by Himself as State Committee of Youth, Physical Culture and Sports | Chairman of the Ministry of Youth Affairs and Spors; 1991-1996 | Succeeded by Syuzanna Stanik as Ministry on Family Affairs and Youth |
Government offices
| Preceded by Mykhailo Baka | Chairman of the State Committee of Youth, Physical Culture and Sports; 1990-1991 | Succeeded by Himself |
| Preceded by Himself | Chairman of the State Committee on Physical Culture and Sports; 1996-1997 | Succeeded by Ivan Fedorenko |
Sporting positions
| Preceded by Pavlo Yesypenko | President of Ukrainian NOC; 1990–1998 | Succeeded by Ivan Fedorenko |

Records
| Preceded by (Jamaica) Donald Quarrie | Men's 200 m Best Year Performance; 1972 | Succeeded by (United States) Steve Williams |
| Preceded by (Soviet Union) Vladislav Sapeya | European Record Holder Men's 100 m 18 August 1968 – 6 September 1970 | Succeeded by (West Germany) Gert Metz |
| Preceded by — | European Record Holder Men's 100 m 31 August 1972 – 14 September 1979 | Succeeded by (Italy) Pietro Mennea |
| Preceded by (Switzerland) Philippe Clerc | European Record Holder Men's 200 m 18 July 1971 – 16 June 1972 | Succeeded by (Italy) Pietro Mennea |
| Preceded by (Italy) Pietro Mennea | European Record Holder Men's 200 m 4 September 1972 – 9 September 1979 | Succeeded by (Italy) Pietro Mennea |
