= Pasquale Giannattasio =

Italian sprinter (1941–2002)

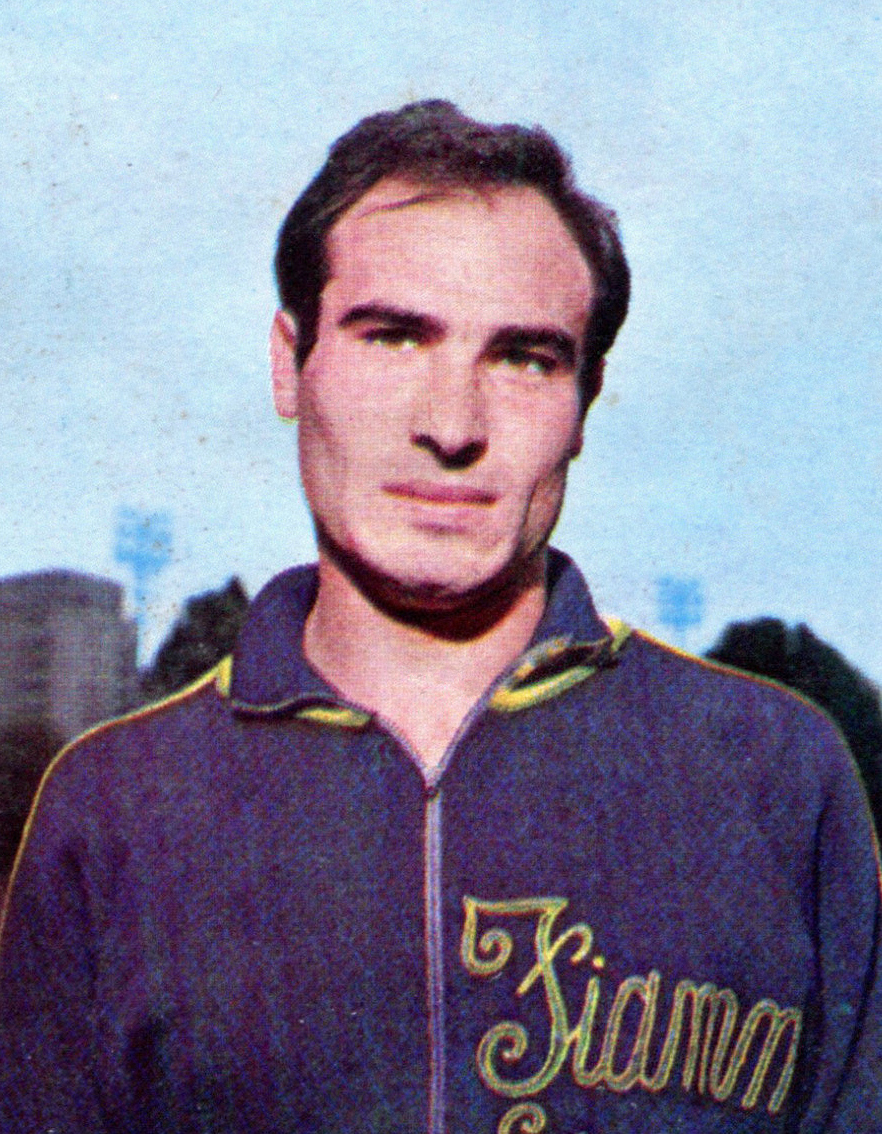

Personal information
- National team: Italy
- Born: 15 January 1941 Giffoni Valle Piana, Italy
- Died: 2 March 2002 (aged 61) Ostia, Italy
- Height: 1.74 m (5 ft 9 in)
- Weight: 74 kg (163 lb)

Sport
- Sport: Athletics
- Event: Sprint
- Club: G.S. Fiamme Gialle

Achievements and titles
- Personal best: 100 m: 10.26 (1968)
Medal record
European Indoor Games
Gold medal – first place	Prague 1967	50 m
Mediterranean Games
Gold medal – first place	Naples 1963	4×100 m relay
Gold medal – first place	Tunis 1967	4×100 m relay
Silver medal – second place	Tunis 1967	100 m

Pasquale Giannattasio (15 January 1941 – 2 March 2002) was an Italian sprinter who won a gold medal in the 50 m at the 1967 European Indoor Games. He was part of the Italian 4 × 100 m relay team that finished seventh at the 1964 Summer Olympics. He won two gold medals with the national relay team at the Mediterranean Games in 1963 and 1967. He took part in 23 international competitions from 1963 to 1968.

== National titles ==
Giannattasio won three national championships in a row at individual senior level.

- Italian Athletics Championships
  - 100 m: 1965, 1866, 1967 (3)
