= Manfred Kokot =

East German sprinter (born 1948)

Medal record

Men's athletics

Representing East Germany

Olympic Games
Silver medal – second place	1976 Montreal	4×100 m

European Championships
Silver medal – second place	1978 Prague	4×100 m
Bronze medal – third place	1974 Rome	4×100 m

European Indoor Championships
Silver medal – second place	1973 Rotterdam	60 m
Silver medal – second place	1974 Gothenburg	60 m
Bronze medal – third place	1971 Sofia	60 m

IAAF World Cup
Silver medal – second place	1977 Düsseldorf	4×100 m

Manfred Kokot (born 3 January 1948 in Templin, Brandenburg) is a former East German athlete, who won the silver medal in the 4 × 100 m relay at the 1976 Summer Olympics in Montreal, Quebec, Canada. He did so alongside Jörg Pfeifer, Klaus-Dieter Kurrat and Alexander Thieme. In 1977, his team came in second place in the 4 × 100 m relay at the IAAF World Cup in Düsseldorf.

In 1971 Kokot became a co-holder of the European 100 m record with 10.0 seconds, and in 1973 he set the world record in 50 metres indoor sprint at 5.61 seconds.
