= Alain Sarteur =

French sprinter

Medal record

Men's athletics

Representing France

European Championships
Silver medal – second place	1969 Athens	100 m

Alain Sarteur (born 17 June 1946 in Plailly, Oise, France) is a French former athlete who competed in the 1972 Summer Olympics.

== 1972 Olympics ==
Sarteur participated in the Men's 100 meters.
