= Barrie Kelly =

British sprinter (born 1940)

Personal information
- Nationality: British (English)
- Born: 2 August 1940 (age 85) Bury, England
- Height: 180 cm (5 ft 11 in)
- Weight: 75 kg (165 lb)

Sport
- Sport: Athletics
- Event: Sprints
- Club: Bury and Radcliffe AC

Barrie Harrison Kelly (born 2 August 1940) is a former sprinter from Bury who competed at the 1968 Summer Olympics.

== Biography ==
Kelly was a member of Bury and Radcliffe Athletic Club. Kelly finished second behind Enrique Figuerola in the 100 yards event at the 1965 AAA Championships but by virtue of being the highest placed British athlete was considered the British 100 yards champion.

His biggest success came in March 1966, when winning the 60 metres at the 1966 European Indoor Games, setting the inaugural world record in the semi-final with 6.6, and equaling this time in the final. He was again British champion after a third place finish at the 1966 AAA Championships and shortly afterwards he represented England in the 100 yards and 110 yards relay, at the 1966 British Empire and Commonwealth Games in Kingston, Jamaica. This was soon followed by appearing for Great Britain at the 1966 European Athletics Championships in Budapest.

Kelly won the 1967 AAA Championships 100 yards title and raced at a second European Championships at the 1969 European Athletics Championships Athens. His Olympic debut came at the 1968 Mexico Olympics, where he competed for Great Britain in the 100 metres and relay.

Between 1965 and 1973 he won 2 gold, 5 silver and 1 bronze medal in the AAA indoor 60 metres/60 yards, missing out on the medals only in 1970.

== Personal life ==
He suffered from asthma and didn't take up athletics till he was 22. He never told the British Amateur Athletic Board of his Asthma, afraid he would miss being selected for the Mexico Olympic Games, and other overseas trips. He went on to represent Great Britain on 33 occasions, which was a record for a sprinter at that time. He also captained the British Men's Team on several occasions.

He had a very successful career in the brewing industry, retiring at the age of 65.

Kelly has always had an interest in photography, and after his retirement, his passion is wildlife. He has a keenness for British wildlife, he has however travelled to many countries, such as Kenya, Botswana, Tanzania, Namibia, India, Canada, the USA, and across Europe.
