= Philippe Clerc =

Swiss sprinter (born 1946)

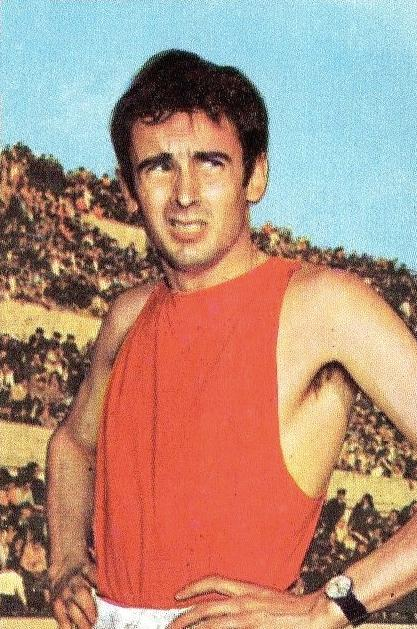

Personal information
- Born: 24 December 1946 (age 79) Port-Valais, Switzerland
- Height: 1.76 m (5 ft 9 in)
- Weight: 61 kg (134 lb)

Sport
- Sport: Athletics
- Event(s): 100 m, 200 m
- Club: CS Le Mouret, Stade Lausanne

Achievements and titles
- Personal best(s): 100 m – 10.42 (1970); 200 m – 20.50 (1969)
Medal record
Men's athletics
Representing Switzerland
European Championships
Gold medal – first place	1969 Athens	200 m
Bronze medal – third place	1969 Athens	100 m

Philippe Clerc (born 24 December 1946) is a former Swiss sprinter who won a bronze and a gold medal in the 100 and 200 m at the 1969 European Athletics Championships, respectively. He competed in these events at the 1972 Summer Olympics, but failed to reach the finals. He was married to English sprinter Janet Simpson, who died of a heart attack on 14 March 2010.
