= Polish Cross Country Championships =

- Date: March/April
- Location: Various, Poland
- Event type: Cross country
- Distance: 10 km and 4 km for men 8 km and 4 km for women
- Established: 1921

The Polish Cross Country Championships (Polish: mistrzostw Polski seniorów w biegu przełajowym) is an annual cross country running organised by the Polish Athletics Association that serves as the national championship for the sport in Poland. It is usually held in March or April.

It was first held in 1921 for men only and became a regular annual fixture form 1924 onwards. A separate women's championship was created in 1928 and the national championship races for both sexes were held in conjunction from 1946 onwards (with one exception in 1948). The women's race was not held from 1938 to 1945 due to World War II, with the men's race not occurring between 1940 and 1945 for the same reason.

Zdzisław Krzyszkowiak is the most successful athlete in the men's division, as a six-time champion and twice runner-up. Katarzyna Kowalska is the most successful athlete in the women's division, and overall, having won seven individual titles and finished runner-up on three occasions.

Unlike other large national cross country competitions, the Polish national cross country programme has been highly variable over its history. A men's short race was added to the programme in 1952 and a further intermediate distance followed in 1955, with three men's races over 3 km, 6 km and 12 km. This arrangement largely persisted until 1970, though the long race was dropped from 1960 to 1965. The men's races were reduced to two (a long and an intermediate) in the period from 1971 to 1981. From 1982 to 1988 only a men's long race was held. From 1989 to 1993 long and intermediate distance races were held for men. After a sole long race in 1994 a men's short course was restored to the programme from 1995 to 2001, then only a long race from 2002 to 2008. Since 2009 a men's long race and short race have been consistently held, typically at distances of 4 km and 10 km.

In its early years, the women's race was held over distances around 1 to 1.5 kilometres. From 1955 to 1957 two women's races were briefly held over distances of 800 metres and 1500 metres. The distance of the women's race increased to 1.8 km in 1968, eventually reached 4 km five years later (matching the distance contested at the 1973 IAAF World Cross Country Championships). Two women's races over 2 km and 4 km were held from 1974 to 1976, then merged into a single 3 km from 1977 to 1978, then returned to a longer two-race format again from 1979 to 1981. A single 4 km women's race was held from 1982 to 1988. From 1989 to 1993 dual races typically around 3 km and 6 km were held. From 1994 to 2008 the single women's race format returned, usually around 4 km in distance. From 2009 to 2014, international standard women's long and short courses were held over 8 km and 4 km. Only a single 5 km race was held from 2015 to 2018, then the international long and short format restored in 2019.

== Medalists ==
=== Men ===
Championship	Distance	Gold		Silver		Bronze	
Warsaw 1921	6.5 km	Jan Baran; Pogoń Lwów	23:10,1	Stanisław Ziffer; Korona Warsaw		Otto Abel; ŁKS Sturm	
Henryków 1924	8.3 km	Stefan Szelestowski; Polonia Warsaw	34:22,2	Stanisław Ziffer; Wisła Kraków	34:44,0	Kazimierz Wituch; Warszawianka	
Warsaw 1925	10 km	Julian Łukaszewicz; Polonia Warsaw	33:37,0	Czesław Centkiewicz; Varsovia Warsaw	34:07,0	Józef Jaworski; AZS Warsaw	34;32,0
Warsaw 1926	10 km	Alfred Freyer; Polonia Warsaw	35:25,0	Roman Sawaryn; Pogoń Lwów	36:20,0	Julian Łukaszewicz; Polonia Warsaw	o 60 m
Warsaw 1927	10 km	Alfred Freyer; Polonia Warsaw	31:29,0	Stefan Szelestowski; Polonia Warsaw	31:35,6	Zdzisław Motyka; AZS Kraków	
Lublin 1928	9 km	Janusz Kusociński; Warszawianka	27:48,2	Marian Sarnacki; Warszawianka	27:49,0	Zdzisław Motyka; AZS Kraków	28:50,4
Królewska Huta 1929	7.5 km	Stanisław Petkiewicz; Warszawianka	23:16,6	Janusz Kusociński; Warszawianka	o 25 m	Marian Sarnacki; Warszawianka	o 200 m
Wilno 1930	7 km	Janusz Kusociński; Warszawianka	25:21,9	Józef Milcz; AZS Warsaw	26:20,6	Tadeusz Adamczyk; Orzeł Warsaw	o 50 m
Kraków 1931	8 km	Janusz Kusociński; Warszawianka	27:25,0	Władysław Czubak; Wawel Kraków	o 150 m	Maksymilian Hartlik; Stadion Królewska Huta	o 100 m
Łuck 1932	8 km	Maksymilian Hartlik; Stadion Królewska Huta	26:17,0	Brunon Miałkas; Warta Poznań	26:38,0	Tadeusz Adamczyk; Orzeł Warsaw	o 70 m
Poznań 1933	9.2 km	Maksymilian Hartlik; Stadion Królewska Huta	30:30,2	Julian Strzałkowski; Jagiellonia Białystok	30:14,0	Jan Robiński; Warta Poznań	o 15 m
Kraków 1934	9.5 km	Kazimierz Fiałka; Cracovia	31:30,4	Maksymilian Hartlik; Stadion Królewska Huta	31:36,2	Franciszek Janowski; Warta Poznań	o 300 m
Bydgoszcz 1935	8 km	Kazimierz Fiałka; Cracovia	31:30,4	Zygmunt Karczewski; Warszawianka	o 250 m	Józef Kurpesa; IKP Łódź	o 30 m
Lublin 1936	8 km	Józef Noji; Legia Warsaw	25:28,6	Kazimierz Fiałka; Cracovia	26:13,4	Franciszek Bodal; AZS Warsaw	o 30 m
Lwów 1937	10 km	Józef Noji; Syrena Warsaw	33:13,2	Czesław Wirkus; Warszawianka	33:24,1	Jan Marynowski; Warszawianka	33:34,0
Łuck 1938	10 km	Józef Noji; Syrena Warsaw	33:52,1	Józef Flis; Strzelec Lublin	34:21,5	Kazimierz Fiałka; Cracovia	34:31,5
Lublin 1939	7.5 km	Józef Noji; Syrena Warsaw	25:46,8	Wacław Karwowski; KPW Katowice	25:50,0	Edward Nowacki; Lechia Lwów	26:19,1
Poznań 1946	6 km	Józef Kurpesa; ŁKS Łódź	20:52,4	Stefan Wierkiewicz; Warta Poznań	21:23,6	Roman Czajkowski; Syrena Warsaw	21:26,1
Łódź 1947	8 km	Napoleon Dzwonkowski; Zryw Włocławek	27:12,6	Paweł Zaprzał; Odra Opole	27:18,2	Czesław Wasielewski; Orzeł Włocławek	27:29,6
Lublin 1948	7 km	Jan Kielas; Zryw Gdańsk	26:40,2	Napoleon Dzwonkowski; Zryw Włocławek	27:19,2	Andrzej Biernat; Wisła Kraków	27:28,8
Białystok 1949	7 km	Jan Kielas; Budowlani Gdańsk	23:42,2	Wiktor Kramek; Gwardia Lublin	23:58,0	Andrzej Biernat; Gwardia Kraków	24:42,0
Żyrardów 1950	8 km	Jan Kielas; Budowlani Gdańsk	24:54,8	Stefan Mielczarek; Spójnie Warsaw	25:26,8	Stanisław Boniecki; Spójnia Gdańsk	25:40,0
Olsztyn 1951	5 km	Jan Szwargot; CWKS Warsaw	15:42,2	Jan Kielas; Gwardia Gdańsk	15:49,2	Alojzy Graj; Gwardia Warsaw	15:58,2
Kalisz 1952	3.5 km	Alojzy Graj; Gwardia Warsaw	11:01,2	Jerzy Chromik; Górnik Zabrze	11:05,5	Józef Kloc; Ogniwo Rzeszów	11:10,4
Kalisz 1952	7 km	Jan Szwargot; CWKS Warsaw	24:05,0	Jan Olesiński; CWKS Warsaw	24:14,4	Mieczysław Szewczyk; Włókniarz Łódź	24:18,2
Zielona Góra 1953	3 km	Alojzy Graj; OWKS Bydgoszcz	10:03,9	Zdzisław Krzyszkowiak; OWKS Lublin	10:07,6	Kazimierz Żbikowski; OWKS Bydgoszcz	10:20,0
Zielona Góra 1953	8 km	Jerzy Chromik; OWKS Kraków	26:30,6	Jan Szwargot; OWKS Kraków	26:44,4	Aleksander Mańkowski; Włókniarz Łódź	26:59,4
Olsztyn 1954	3 km	Zdzisław Krzyszkowiak; CWKS Warsaw	11:06,2	Alojzy Graj; CWKS Bydgoszcz	11:24,6	Władysław Płonka; Włókniarz Bielawa	11:26,4
Olsztyn 1954	8 km	Jerzy Chromik; Górnik Mysłowice	26:13,2	Stanisław Ożóg; CWKS Warsaw	26:23,4	Jan Szwargot; CWKS Kraków	26:35,5
Gorzów Wlkp. 1955	3 km	Roman Kreft; CWKS Bydgoszcz	6:41,7	Kazimierz Zimny; LZS Tczew	6:49,2	Edward Majewski; Start Olsztyn	6:52,5
Gorzów Wlkp. 1955	6 km	Kazimierz Żbikowski; CWKS Bydgoszcz	12:59,5	Alojzy Graj; CWKS Bydgoszcz	13:04,8	Mieczysław Lewicki; Kolejarz Toruń	13:45,7
Gorzów Wlkp. 1955	12 km	Stanisław Ożóg; CWKS Warsaw	26:54,1	Jan Szwargot; CWKS Kraków	28:06,8	Benedykt Gugała; Kolejarz Kraków	28:15,4
Opole 1956	3 km	Henryk Gralewski; AZS Warsaw	7:53,4	Wacław Ziółkowski; CWKS Bydgoszcz	8:01,5	Stefan Kryża; CWKS Bydgoszcz	8:02,8
Opole 1956	6 km	Alojzy Graj; CWKS Bydgoszcz	16:51,2	Kazimierz Zimny; CWKS Bydgoszcz	16:58,4	Mieczysław Lewicki; Kolejarz Toruń	17:04,6
Opole 1956	12 km	Jerzy Chromik; Górnik Zabrze	33:01,2	Zdzisław Krzyszkowiak; CWKS Bydgoszcz	33:03,2	Jan Szwargot; CWKS Kraków	33:31,0
Skarżysko-Kamienna 1957	3 km	Marian Jochman; CWKS Bydgoszcz	9:16,0	Jerzy Bruszkowski; CWKS Bydgoszcz	9:17,0	Edward Augustyn; CWKS Bydgoszcz	9:21,2
Skarżysko-Kamienna 1957	6 km	Zdzisław Krzyszkowiak; CWKS Bydgoszcz	19:17,2	Władysław Sztwiertnia; AZS Kraków	19:41,2	Andrzej Marczyk; AZS Gliwice	19:45,4
Skarżysko-Kamienna 1957	12 km	Stanisław Ożóg; CWKS Kraków	37:57,4	Tadeusz Kuchniewski; Drukarz Warsaw	38:28,2	Zbigniew Mazur; Piast Brzeg	38:46,2
Skarżysko-Kamienna 1958	3 km	Marian Jochman; Zawisza Bydgoszcz	8:53,4	Ryszard Szczepański; Olimpia Grudziądz	8:56,0	Jerzy Bruszkowski; Zawisza Bydgoszcz	8:58,4
Skarżysko-Kamienna 1958	6 km	Zdzisław Krzyszkowiak; Zawisza Bydgoszcz	18:54,2	Alojzy Graj; Zawisza Bydgoszcz	19:24,8	Władysław Płonka; Bielawianka Bielawa	19:24,8
Skarżysko-Kamienna 1958	12 km	Stanisław Ożóg; Wawel Kraków	37:58,0	Tadeusz Kuchniewski; Drukarz Warsaw	38:39,4	Mieczysław Kierlewicz; Jagiellonia Białystok	38:39,4
Skarżysko-Kamienna 1959	3 km	Marian Jochman; Zawisza Bydgoszcz	9:03,0	Jerzy Bruszkowski; Zawisza Bydgoszcz	9:07,6	Wacław Ziółkowski; Zawisza Bydgoszcz	9:08,2
Skarżysko-Kamienna 1959	6 km	Władysław Płonka; Bielawianka Bielawa	18:13,6	Władysław Sztwiertnia; Górnik Zabrze	18:48,0	Jerzy Golda; Lechia Gdańsk	18:54,2
Skarżysko-Kamienna 1959	12 km	Tadeusz Kuchniewski; Drukarz Warsaw	35:35,0	Mieczysław Kierlewicz; Jagiellonia Białystok	35:37,3	Andrzej Mierzejewski; Warta Poznań	36:28,2
Skarżysko-Kamienna 1960	3 km	Marian Jochman; Zawisza Bydgoszcz	6:42,0	Edward Owczarek; AZS Wrocław	8:43,0	Lech Boguszewicz; LKS Sopot	8:44,8
Skarżysko-Kamienna 1960	6 km	Zdzisław Krzyszkowiak; Zawisza Bydgoszcz	18:23,2	Mieczysław Kierlewicz; Skra Warsaw	18:32,6	Henryk Połeć; Start Elbląg	18:49,0
Skarżysko-Kamienna 1960	12 km	Stanisław Ożóg; Wawel Kraków	35:05,4	Tadeusz Kuchniewski; Skra Warsaw	35:28,8	Jacek Nowakowski; Legia Warsaw	36:31,3
Poznań 1961	4 km	Zdzisław Krzyszkowiak; Zawisza Bydgoszcz	11:42,8	Edward Owczarek; AZS Wrocław	11:50,2	Jerzy Mathias; Zawisza Bydgoszcz	11:57,2
Poznań 1961	8 km	Stanisław Ożóg; Wawel Kraków	26:29,2	Mieczysław Kierlewicz; Skra Warsaw		Andrzej Kempa; Lechia Zielona Góra	
Żyrardów 1962	3.5 km	Jerzy Mathias; Zawisza Bydgoszcz	9:37,8	Edward Motyl; Olimpia Poznań	9:44,0	Wiesław Kowalski; Olimpia Poznań	9:44,0
Żyrardów 1962	6 km	Zdzisław Krzyszkowiak; Zawisza Bydgoszcz	19:02,8	Stanisław Ożóg; Wawel Kraków	19:08,8	Edward Owczarek; Śląsk Wrocław	19:23,0
Puławy 1963	3 km	Edward Szklarczyk; Legia Warsaw	10:01,2	Bolesław Kowalczyk; Zawisza Bydgoszcz	10:11,8	Marian Mizeraczyk; Budowlani Bydgoszcz	10:13,2
Puławy 1963	6 km	Jerzy Mathias; Zawisza Bydgoszcz	18:51,8	Edward Owczarek; Śląsk Wrocław	18:54,2	Edward Stawiarz; Wawel Kraków	19:04,4
Zielona Góra 1964	3.5 km	Bolesław Kowalczyk; Zawisza Bydgoszcz	10:41,8	Marian Jochman; Zawisza Bydgoszcz	10:42,0	Roman Tkaczyk; Górnik Wałbrzych	10:42,0
Zielona Góra 1964	6 km	Edward Owczarek; Gwardia Wrocław	20:18,2	Stanisław Ożóg; Wawel Kraków	20:23,6	Edward Stawiarz; Wawel Kraków	20:44,0
Sopot 1965	5 km	Lech Boguszewicz; Spójnia Gdańsk	15:15,2	Edward Szklarczyk; Legia Warsaw	15:15,6	Edward Stawiarz; Wawel Kraków	15:20,4
Sopot 1965	8 km	Kazimierz Zimny; Lechia Gdańsk	23:43,8	Edward Owczarek; Gwardia Wrocław	23:44,2	Jerzy Chromik; Górnik Zabrze	23:48,8
Otwock 1966	3 km	Henryk Szordykowski; Wawel Kraków	10:47,4	Roland Brehmer; Start Katowice	10:49,4	Stanisław Podzoba; Cracovia	10:52,4
Otwock 1966	6 km	Kazimierz Zimny; Lechia Gdańsk	22:09,6	Lech Boguszewicz; Spójnia Gdańsk	22:14,4	Edward Stawiarz; Wawel Kraków	22:21,2
Otwock 1966	12 km	Edward Owczarek; Górnik Wałbrzych	40:05,4	Kazimierz Podolak; Wybrzeże Gdańsk	40:09,2	Czesław Wajda; Spójnia Gdańsk	40:14,7
Otwock 1967	3 km	Henryk Szordykowski; Wawel Kraków	9:06,0	Stanisław Podzoba; Cracovia	9:06,8	Henryk Piotrowski; Lotnik Warsaw	9:14,4
Otwock 1967	6 km	Kazimierz Zimny; Lechia Gdańsk	18:42,4	Edward Stawiarz; Wawel Kraków	18:44,0	Czesław Wajda; Spójnia Gdańsk	18:49,4
Otwock 1967	12 km	Henryk Szutko; Calisia Kalisz	35:40,6	Mieczysław Korzec; Górnik Brzeszcze	36:06,6	Czesław Kołodyński; Śląsk Wrocław	36:19,2
Ostrzeszów 1968	3 km	Stanisław Podzoba; Cracovia	8:53,0	Jerzy Maluśki; Legia Warsaw	8:53,2	Kazimierz Maranda; ŁKS Łódź	8:58,2
Ostrzeszów 1968	6 km	Henryk Piotrowski; Legia Warsaw	18:31,8	Wolfgang Luers; Lechia Gdańsk	18:36,4	Roland Brehmer; Start Katowice	18:38,2
Ostrzeszów 1968	12 km	Henryk Szutko; Calisia Kalisz	38:55,4	Zdzisław Bogusz; Warszawianka	39:13,2	Czesław Wajda; Spójnia Gdańsk	40:32,4
Otwock 1969	5 km	Edward Łęgowski; Legia Warsaw	15:37,8	Jerzy Maluśki; Legia Warsaw	15:48,8	Edward Mleczko; Cracovia	15:53,3
Otwock 1969	8 km	Henryk Piotrowski; Legia Warsaw	26:26,9	Stanisław Podzoba; Cracovia	26:31,0	Stanisław Śmitkowski; Oleśniczanka Oleśnica	26:31,0
Otwock 1969	12 km	Czesław Wajda; Spójnia Gdańsk	40:12,0	Jan Wawrzuta; Śląsk Wrocław	40:32,0	Michał Wójcik; Śląsk Wrocław	42:08,0
Sanok 1970	4 km	Henryk Szordykowski; Wawel Kraków	13:14,2	Jan Kondzior; MKS-AZS Warsaw	13:16,8	Kazimierz Maranda; ŁKS Łódź	13:24,0
Sanok 1970	7.5 km	Stanisław Podzoba; Cracovia	22:05,0	Edward Mleczko; Cracovia	22:07,0	Edward Łęgowski; Legia Warsaw	22:13,8
Sanok 1970	10 km	Jan Wawrzuta; Śląsk Wrocław	29:56,4	Henryk Piotrowski; Legia Warsaw	30:13,6	Czesław Wajda; Spójnia Gdańsk	30:35,4
Ostrzeszów 1971	6 km	Henryk Piotrowski; Legia Warsaw	17:33,4	Stanisław Podzoba; Cracovia	17:38,2	Józef Rębacz; ŁKS Łódź	17:40,2
Ostrzeszów 1971	12 km	Edward Łęgowski; Legia Warsaw	35:06,8	Czesław Wajda; Spójnia Gdańsk	35:29,6	Jan Wawrzuta; Śląsk Wrocław	35:35,4
Nowa Huta 1972	6 km	Henryk Szordykowski; Wawel Kraków	17:38,8	Bronisław Malinowski; Olimpia Grudziądz	17:40,6	Henryk Piotrowski; Legia Warsaw	17:44,2
Nowa Huta 1972	12 km	Edward Łęgowski; Legia Warsaw	37:02,2	Jan Wawrzuta; Śląsk Wrocław	37:10,0	Edward Stawiarz; Wawel Kraków	37:23,2
Zalesie Dolne 1973	6 km	Edward Łęgowski; Legia Warsaw		Leopold Tomaszewicz; Flota Gdynia		Stanisław Śmitkowski; Oleśniczanka Oleśnica	
Zalesie Dolne 1973	12 km	Bronisław Malinowski; Olimpia Grudziądz	34:01,0	Zbigniew Pierzynka; Hutnik Nowa Huta	34:27,6	Henryk Nogala; Oleśniczanka Oleśnica	34:27,9
Kielce 1974	6 km	Bronisław Malinowski; Olimpia Grudziądz	25:18,4	Zbigniew Sawicki; Wawel Kraków	25:18,8	Jerzy Kowol; Górnik Zabrze	25:24,6
Kielce 1974	12 km	Zbigniew Pierzynka niestowarzyszony	51:25,6	Edward Mleczko; Cracovia	51:26,2	Edward Łęgowski; Legia Warsaw	51;34,0
Ostrzeszów 1975	8 km	Edward Łęgowski; Legia Warsaw	25:24,0	Andrzej Jarosiewicz; Wawel Kraków	25:30,8	Henryk Nogala; Oleśniczanka Oleśnica	25:32,0
Ostrzeszów 1975	16 km	Jan Wawrzuta; Śląsk Wrocław	47:54,0	Ryszard Kopijasz; Górnik Brzeszcze	47:57,0	Zbigniew Sawicki; Wawel Kraków	48:12,0
Koszalin 1976	8 km	Jerzy Kowol; Górnik Zabrze	24:15,6	Leszek Bierkus; Flota Gdynia	24:26,2	Leopold Tomaszewicz; Flota Gdynia	24:29,0
Koszalin 1976	14 km	Henryk Piotrowski; Legia Warsaw	41:13,6	Wiesław Wojtkuński; Budowlani Bydgoszcz	41:30,4	Kazimierz Orzeł; GKS Jaworzno	41:34,4
Tarnów 1977	6 km	Ludwik Hapel; Zagłębie Lubin	18:42,8	Andrzej Jarosiewicz; Wawel Kraków	18:48,2	Andrzej Sajkowski; Legia Warsaw	18:54,8
Tarnów 1977	12 km	Zbigniew Pierzynka; Wisła Kraków	36:55,8	Ryszard Chudecki; ŁKS Łódź	37:00,0	Zbigniew Sawicki; Wawel Kraków	37:02,6
Oleśnica 1978	6 km	Bogusław Mamiński; Oleśniczanka Oleśnica; Adam Rogowski; AZS Wrocław	16:09,6			Wiktor Sawicki; Wawel Kraków	16:10,8
Oleśnica 1978	12 km	Henryk Piotrowski; Legia Warsaw	35:25,9	Andrzej Jarosiewicz; Wawel Kraków	35:26,0	Zbigniew Sawicki; Wawel Kraków	35:28,0
Kielce 1979	7 km	Bronisław Malinowski; Olimpia Grudziądz	18:28,0	Daniel Jańczuk; Śląsk Wrocław	18:42,8	Henryk Wasilewski; Orkan Poznań	18:43,6
Kielce 1979	14 km	Wiesław Wojtkuński; BKS Bydgoszcz	42:54,2	Jerzy Kowol; Górnik Zabrze	42:54,6	Zbigniew Pierzynka; Wisła Kraków	42:56,3
Burzenin 1980	7 km	Daniel Jańczuk; Śląsk Wrocław	18:38,3	Eugeniusz Stacha; ROW Rybnik	18:42,3	Jan Pawliński; Żeglina Sieradz	18:45,5
Burzenin 1980	14 km	Kazimierz Bąk; Flota Gdynia	37:47,1	Ryszard Finster; Górnik Zabrze	37:49,8	Henryk Nogala; Oleśniczanka Oleśnica	38:09,5
Warsaw 1981	6 km	Bogusław Mamiński; Oleśniczanka Oleśnica	17:42,0	Maciej Kunicki; Śląsk Wrocław	17:47,0	Krzysztof Wesołowski; Śląsk Wrocław	17:49,0
Warsaw 1981	10 km	Daniel Jańczuk; Śląsk Wrocław	30:35,0	Andrzej Sajkowski; Legia Warsaw	30:38,0	Wiesław Furmanek; Hutnik Kraków	30:43,0
Piła 1982	9 km	Bogusław Psujek; Oleśniczanka Oleśnica	25:28,8	Bogumił Kuś; Oleśniczanka Oleśnica	25:33,8	Antoni Niemczak; Śląsk Wrocław	25:36,3
Poznań 1983	9 km	Bogumił Kuś; Oleśniczanka Oleśnica	25:31,0	Wiktor Sawicki; Wawel Kraków	25:35,0	Włodzimierz Koniarski; Oleśniczanka Oleśnica	25:42,0
Elbląg 1984	9 km	Bogumił Kuś; Oleśniczanka Oleśnica	26:26	Piotr Gruszczyński; AZS Poznań	26:32	Tomasz Kozłowski; Oleśniczanka Oleśnica	26:40
Pionki 1985	9 km	Antoni Niemczak; Śląsk Wrocław	31:08	Stanisław Zdunek; LZS Skierniewice	31:20	Waldemar Niklewicz; Olimpia Grudziądz	31:26
Warsaw 1986	10 km	Bogusław Psujek; Oleśniczanka Oleśnica	32:27	Sławomir Gurny; Zawisza Bydgoszcz	32:28	Karol Dołęga; Oleśniczanka Oleśnica	32:29
Warsaw 1987	12 km	Krzysztof Wesołowski; Śląsk Wrocław	31:10	Bogusław Psujek; Oleśniczanka Oleśnica	31:21	Andrzej Malicki; AZS Olsztyn	31:25
Żagań 1988	12 km	Bogusław Psujek; Oleśniczanka Oleśnica	38:43	Jan Huruk; Gryf Słupsk	39:00	Karol Dołęga; Oleśniczanka Oleśnica	39:21
Ostrów Wlkp. 1989	6 km	Leszek Bebło; Oleśniczanka Oleśnica		Henryk Jankowski; Olimpia Poznań		Dariusz Skura; Legia Warsaw	
Ostrów Wlkp. 1989	12 km	Sławomir Majusiak; Stal Ostrów Wielkopolski		Karol Dołęga; Oleśniczanka Oleśnica		Mirosław Gołębiewski; ROW Rybnik	
Olsztyn 1990	7 km	Jan Huruk; Gryf Słupsk	21:51	Dariusz Skura; AZS Lublin	21:57	Zbigniew Nadolski; Olimpia Poznań	22:01
Olsztyn 1990	10.5 km	Sławomir Majusiak; Stal Ostrów Wielkopolski	32:22	Sławomir Gurny; Zawisza Bydgoszcz	32:24	Karol Dołęga; Oleśniczanka Oleśnica	32:34
Skarżysko-Kamienna 1991	6 km	Bogusław Mamiński; Legia Warsaw	20:08	Jan Huruk; Gryf Słupsk	20:15	Grzegorz Kowalczyk; Oleśniczanka Oleśnica	20:19
Skarżysko-Kamienna 1991	12 km	Leszek Bebło; Oleśniczanka Oleśnica	40:27	Tomasz Kozłowski; Oleśniczanka Oleśnica	41:08	Grzegorz Gajdus; Oleśniczanka Oleśnica	41:14
Kędzierzyn 1992	6 km	Leszek Bebło; Oleśniczanka Oleśnica	17:31	Henryk Jankowski; Olimpia Poznań	17:33	Michał Bartoszak; Olimpia Poznań	17:34
Kędzierzyn 1992	12 km	Grzegorz Gajdus; Oleśniczanka Oleśnica	36:21	Karol Dołęga; Oleśniczanka Oleśnica	36:22	Mirosław Plawgo; Oleśniczanka Oleśnica	36:30
Płock 1993	6 km	Waldemar Glinka; AZS-AWF Wrocław	19:02	Artur Osman; AZS-AWF Gdańsk	19:09	Mariusz Staniszewski; Olimpia Poznań	19:16
Płock 1993	12 km	Karol Dołęga; Oleśniczanka Oleśnica	38:02	Leszek Bebło; Oleśniczanka Oleśnica	38:12	Mirosław Plawgo; Oleśniczanka Oleśnica	38:19
Bydgoszcz 1994	9 km	Krzysztof Bałdyga; Oleśniczanka Oleśnica	29:10	Piotr Gładki; Lechia Gdańsk	29:13	Artur Osman; Granat-Dami Skarżysko-Kamienna	29:25
Sopot 1995	5 km	Rafał Wójcik; STS Skarżysko-Kamienna	15:24	Piotr Gładki; Lechia Gdańsk	15:29	Waldemar Glinka; AZS-AWF Wrocław	15:30
Sopot 1995	12 km	Artur Osman; STS Skarżysko-Kamienna	38:03	Adam Szanowicz; Gryf Słupsk	38:25	Krzysztof Bałdyga; Oleśniczanka Oleśnica	38:25
Oleśnica 1996	5 km	Jan Zakrzewski; Oleśniczanka Oleśnica	16:55	Rafał Wójcik; STS Skarżysko-Kamienna	16:55	Jacek Kasprzyk; Wawel Kraków	17:01
Oleśnica 1996	12 km	Piotr Gładki; Lechia Gdańsk	43:07	Krzysztof Bałdyga; Oleśniczanka Oleśnica	43:14	Artur Osman; STS Skarżysko-Kamienna	43:18
Strzelce Krajeńskie-Długie 1997	5 km	Rafał Wójcik; Oleśniczanka Oleśnica	13:06	Leszek Lewandowski; Vectra Włocławek	13:13	Piotr Gładki; Lechia Gdańsk	13:18
Strzelce Krajeńskie-Długie 1997	12 km	Artur Osman; Kolejarz Katowice	29:34	Leszek Bebło; Stal Stalowa Wola	29:39	Zbigniew Nadolski; Olimpia Poznań	30:01
Międzyzdroje 1998	4.6 km	Rafał Wójcik; Sporting Międzyzdroje	13:35	Marek Drzała; Śląsk Wrocław	13:47	Dariusz Kruczkowski; Zawisza Bydgoszcz	13:53
Międzyzdroje 1998	12 km	Krzysztof Bałdyga; Browar Schöller Namysłów	35:15	Leszek Bebło; Sporting Międzyzdroje	25:26	Sławomir Kąpiński; Browar Schöller Namysłów	35:33
Żagań 1999	4.8 km	Dariusz Kruczkowski; Zawisza Bydgoszcz	12:27	Eryk Szostak; Wawel Kraków	12:28	Robert Witt; Zryw Toruń	12:29
Żagań 1999	12 km	Artur Osman; Ekspres Katowice	34:27	Piotr Drwal; Gryf Słupsk	34:29	Zbigniew Nadolski; Olimpia Poznań	34:30
Chorzów 2000	4.5 km	Dariusz Kruczkowski; Zawisza Bydgoszcz	13:38	Jan Zakrzewski; Oleśniczanka Oleśnica	13:40	Jarosław Cichocki; Iskra Białogard	13:47
Chorzów 2000	12 km	Leszek Bebło; Sporting Międzyzdroje	37:42	Andrzej Ofiara; MKS Kozienice	37:42	Rafał Wójcik; Sporting Międzyzdroje	37:43
Kraków 2001	5 km	Rafał Wójcik; Sporting Międzyzdroje	16:40	Dariusz Kruczkowski; Zawisza Bydgoszcz	16:45	Eryk Szostak; Wawel Kraków	16:54
Kraków 2001	12 km	Piotr Drwal; Gryf Słupsk	39:08	Leszek Bebło; Sporting Międzyzdroje	39:09	Artur Osman; Ekspres Katowice	39:43
Poznań 2002	10 km	Michał Bartoszak; Warszawianka	29:53	Piotr Gładki; Sporting Międzyzdroje	29:55	Arkadiusz Sowa; Oleśniczanka Oleśnica	29:59
Międzyzdroje 2002	10 km	Artur Osman; Ekspres Katowice	35:56	Dariusz Kruczkowski; Zawisza Bydgoszcz	36:09	Rafał Wójcik; Sporting Międzyzdroje	36:23
Kwidzyn 2004	10 km	Rafał Wójcik; Sporting Międzyzdroje	30:51	Michał Kaczmarek; LLKS Gubin	31:00	Artur Osman; Ekspres Katowice	31:02
Police 2005	10 km	Jakub Czaja; SKLA Sopot	30:43	Henryk Szost; Podgórze Kraków	30:48	Michał Kaczmarek; Grunwald Poznań	30:57
Wejherowo 2006	10 km	Michał Kaczmarek; Grunwald Poznań	30:58	Kamil Murzyn; Cracovia	30:58	Mariusz Giżyński; Sporting Międzyzdroje	30:59
Bydgoszcz 2007	10 km	Marcin Chabowski; Wejher Wejherowo	31:23	Michał Kaczmarek; Grunwald Poznań	31:28	Henryk Szost; Oleśniczanka Oleśnica	31:40
Kwidzyn 2008	8 km	Marcin Chabowski; Wejher Wejherowo	24:17	Karol Rzeszewicz; Zantyr Sztum	24:18	Rafał Wójcik; KKL Kielce	24:22
Olszyna 2009	4 km	Marcin Błaziński; Grunwald Poznań	12:04	Łukasz Skoczyński; Budowlani Częstochowa	12:12	Adam Matuła; Zawisza Bydgoszcz	12:18
Olszyna 2009	10 km	Mariusz Giżyński; Sporting Międzyzdroje	29:25	Henryk Szost; Grunwald Poznań	29:42	Artur Kozłowski; MULKS MOS Sieradz	29:59
Bydgoszcz 2010	4 km	Mateusz Demczyszak; Śląsk Wrocław	12:37	Artur Olejarz; ZLKL Zielona Góra	12:39	Michał Breszka; Maratończyk Lębork	12:41
Bydgoszcz 2010	12 km	Marcin Chabowski; Flota Gdynia	38:42	Arkadiusz Gardzielewski; Śląsk Wrocław	38:55	Kamil Poczwardowski; Sporting Międzyzdroje	39:14
Zamość 2011	4 km	Tomasz Szymkowiak; Orkan Września	13:57	Artur Kozłowski; MULKS MOS Sieradz	14:05	Marek Kowalski; SKLA Sopot	14:28
Zamość 2011	12 km	Marcin Chabowski; Flota Gdynia	43:15	Radosław Kłeczek; Śląsk Wrocław	43:23	Kamil Poczwardowski; Sporting Międzyzdroje	43:25
Bydgoszcz 2012	4 km	Mateusz Demczyszak; Śląsk Wrocław	11:43	Bartosz Nowicki; Śląsk Wrocław	11:45	Artur Olejarz; ZUKL Zielona Góra	11:50
Bydgoszcz 2012	12 km	Tomasz Szymkowiak; Orkan Września	37:03	Krystian Zalewski; Barnim Goleniów	37:08	Radosław Kłeczek; Sporting Międzyzdroje	37:14
Bydgoszcz 2013	4 km	Krzysztof Żebrowski; UOLKA Ostrów Maz.	11:16	Mateusz Demczyszak; Śląsk Wrocław	11:19	Tomasz Osmulski; RKS Łódź	11:27
Bydgoszcz 2013	12 km	Błażej Brzeziński; Śląsk Wrocław	34:42	Arkadiusz Gardzielewski; Śląsk Wrocław	34:47	Tomasz Szymkowiak; Orkan Września	34:55
Kraków 2014	4 km	Mateusz Demczyszak; Śląsk Wrocław	11:11	Artur Olejarz; MKL Szczecin	11:15	Piotr Łobodziński; LŁKS Prefbet Śniadowo Łomża	11:34
Kraków 2014	10 km	Krzysztof Gosiewski; LKS Ostromecko	29:29	Emil Dobrowolski; LŁKS Prefbet Śniadowo Łomża	29:44	Jakub Nowak; LŁKS Prefbet Śniadowo Łomża	29:47
Iława 2015	4 km	Tomasz Osmulski; RKS Łódź	11:39	Miłosz Borowski; MKS Durasan Płońsk	11:43	Artur Olejarz; MKL Szczecin	11:44
Iława 2015	10 km	Arkadiusz Gardzielewski; WKS Śląsk Wrocław	30:15	Adam Nowicki; MKL Szczecin	30:17	Tomasz Szymkowiak; MKS Toruń	30:29
Żagań 2016	4 km	Mateusz Demczyszak; WKS Śląsk Wrocław	11:59	Marcin Lewandowski; CWZS Zawisza Bydgoszcz	12:05	Tomasz Osmulski; RKS Łodź	12:10
Żagań 2016	10 km	Tomasz Grycko; UKS Bliza Władysławowo	31:42	Dawid Malina; ROW Rybnik	31:52	Andrzej Rogiewicz; LKS Zantyr Sztum	31:53
Jelenia Góra 2017	4 km	Arkadiusz Gardzielewski; WKS Śląsk Wrocław	11:43	Mateusz Demczyszak; LŁKS Prefbet Śniadowo Łomża	11:51	Michał Rozmys; UKS Barnim Goleniów	11:54
Jelenia Góra 2017	10 km	Tomasz Grycko; UKS Bliza Władysławowo	30:02	Marek Kowalski; GKS Żukowo	30:31	Mariusz Giżyński; WKS Grunwald Poznań	30:36
Żagań 2018	4 km	Mateusz Demczyszak; LŁKS Prefbet Śniadowo Łomża	11:31	Patryk Błaszczyk; LKS Jantar Ustka	11:34	Dariusz Boratyński; KS AZS AWF Wrocław	11:35
Żagań 2018	10 km	Tomasz Grycko; UKS Bliza Władysławowo	29:12	Krystian Zalewski; UKS Barnim Goleniów	29:19	Robert Głowala; GKS Wilga Garwolin	30:14
Olszyna 2019	4 km	Arkadiusz Gardzielewski; WKS Śląsk Wrocław	12:35	Patryk Błaszczyk; LKS Jantar Ustka	12:45	Patryk Marszałek; CWKS Resovia Rzeszów	12:51
Olszyna 2019	10 km	Tomasz Grycko; UKS Bliza Władysławowo	33:08	Emil Dobrowolski; LŁKS Prefbet Śniadowo Łomża	33:21	Piotr Łobodziński; LŁKS Prefbet Śniadowo Łomża	33:34

=== Women ===
Championship	Distance	Gold		Silver		Bronze	
Królewska Huta 1928	1.2 km	Otylia Tabacka; KKS Katowice	4:36,6	Janina Fischer-Sawczak; Cracovia	o 20 m	Leokadia Perono; KS 06 Katowice	
Łódź 1929	1.2 km	Leokadia Wieczorkiewicz; AZS Warsaw	4:35,8	Maria Gołaj; ŁKS Łódź	5:27,0		
Królewska Huta 1930	1.2 km	Otylia Tabacka; Stadion Królewska Huta	4:10,0	Leokadia Wieczorkiewicz; AZS Warsaw	o 60 m	Helena Tilschner; Stadion Królewska Huta	
Lublin 1931	1.3 km	Janina Bystrzycka; Sokół Kozłówka	5:17,4	Rozalia Grzesik; Stadion Królewska Huta	o 30 m	Halina Jarnuszkiewicz; Unia Lublin	o dłoń
Królewska Huta 1932	1.45 km	Maria Szuas; Pogoń Katowice	4:55,6	Jadwiga Głażewska; ŁKS Łódź	4:58,2	Jadwiga Nowacka; AZS Warsaw	
Łódź 1933	0.8 km	Jadwiga Nowacka; AZS Warsaw	3:05,6	Irena Świderska; AZS Poznań	3:08,2	Maria Szuas; Pogoń Katowice	o 1,5 m
Lwów 1934	1.0 km	Jadwiga Nowacka; AZS Warsaw	3:04,0	Izabella Robakowska; Sokół Lwów	3:38,0	Helena Gasparska; AZS Lwów	o 50 m
Mysłowice 1935	1.8 km	Irena Świderska; AZS Poznań	8:12,2	Helena Gediga; Pogoń Katowice	8:36,0	Hildegarda Loska; Sokół Chorzów	8:50,0
Poznań 1936	1.5 km	Jadwiga Nowacka; AZS Warsaw	5:38,6	Irena Świderska; AZS Poznań		Zofia Kwasiborska; Supraślanka Supraśl	
Kraków 1937	1.15 km	Bella Hornstein; Hasmonea Lwów	4:14,1	Maria Mąka; Ciszewski Bydgoszcz	4:19,0	Maria Tekielaki; Legia Kraków	4:24,8
1938-1945	nie rozgrywano						
Poznań 1946	1.5 km	Irena Białkowska; Warta Poznań	6:24,0	Maria Mąka; Brda Bydgoszcz	6:25,0	Helena Stachowicz; Legia Kraków	6:25,7
Łódź 1947	1.2 km	Wanda Wasielewska; Zgoda Świętochłowice	4:36,8	Stanisława Nocoń; Zgoda Świętochłowice	4:41,2	Maria Mieszkowska; Syrena Warsaw	4:43,4
Olsztyn 1948	1.0 km	Genowefa Cieślik; Odzieżowiec Poznań	3:58,8	Maria Borowska; HKS Olsztyn	4:24,5	Janina Bierżańska; Pocztowiec Olsztyn	4:40,8
Białystok 1949	2.2 km	Pelagia Wójcik; LZS Żurawica	12:10,3	Maria Jajkiewicz; LZS Żurawica	12:11,8	Helena Styczyńska; LZS Żurawica	12:20,4
Żyrardów 1950	1.2 km	Czesława Gryczka; LZS Żurawica	5:01,2	Zofia Biała; Unia Myszków	5:24,0	Zofia Sikora; Legia Warsaw	5:26,0
Olsztyn 1951	1.2 km	Czesława Gryczka; Stal Stalowa Wola	3:49,2	Anna Skrzetuska; CWKS	3:51,8	Lucyna Olewińska; Spójnia Białystok	3:56,0
Kalisz 1952	1.2 km	Czesława Gryczka; Stal Stalowa Wola	4:24,6	Teresa Przywara; CWKS Warsaw	4:38,4	Wanda Borowska; Gwardia Wrocław	4:40,9
Zielona Góra 1953	1.0 km	Bożena Pestka; Spójnia Gdańsk	3:39,0	Michalina Piwowar; Stal Katowice	3:42,0	Konstancja Żakowska; OWKS Lublin	3:44,0
Olsztyn 1954	1.0 km	Halina Gabor; Włókniarz Otmęt	3:35,6	Bożena Pestka; Spójnia Gdańsk	3:35,6	Joanna Nowak; OWKS Lublin	3:39,9
Gorzów Wlkp. 1955	0.8 km	Michalina Wawrzynek; Stal Katowice	2:40,2	Irena Nowakowska; Unia Wrocław	2:43,6	Karolina Sroka; AZS Kraków	2:45,0
Gorzów Wlkp. 1955	1.5 km	Halina Gabor; Włókniarz Otmęt	4:53,0	Bożena Pestka; Spójnia Gdańsk	4:54,2	Irena Zarzycka; Sparta Warsaw	4:56,0
Opole 1956	0.8 km	Michalina Wawrzynek; Stal Katowice	2:28,8	Beata Żbikowska; OWKS Bydgoszcz	2:32,2	Mirosława Nowaczyk; Doker Gdynia	2:32,6
Opole 1956	1.5 km	Halina Gabor; Włókniarz Otmęt	4:03,0	Bożena Pestka; Sparta Gdańsk	4:07,8	Irena Zarzycka; Sparta Warsaw	4:14,4
Skarżysko-Kamienna 1957	0.8 km	Beata Żbikowska; OWKS Bydgoszcz	2:20,0	Michalina Wawrzynek; Stal Katowice	2:22,3	Irena Nowakowska; Unia Wałbrzych	2:25,7
Skarżysko-Kamienna 1957	1.5 km	Halina Gabor; Silesia Otmęt	4:43,0	Krystyna Snop; KSZO Ostrowiec	4:47,4	Irena Zarzycka; Sparta Warsaw	4:50,8
Skarżysko-Kamienna 1958	1.2 km	Krystyna Nowakowska; KSZO Ostrowiec	3:54,1	Zofia Walasek; Start Katowice	3:55,5	Michalina Wawrzynek; Baildon Katowice	3:59,2
Skarżysko-Kamienna 1959	1.2 km	Krystyna Nowakowska; Legia Warsaw	3:34,8	Henryka Staneta; Łysica Kielce	3:36,1	Zofia Walasek; Start Katowice	3:44,8
Skarżysko-Kamienna 1960	1.5 km	Henryka Staneta; Łysica Kielce	5:00,8	Zofia Walasek; Start Katowice	5:02,8	Janina Hase; Lechia Gdańsk	5:07,6
Poznań 1961	1.5 km	Krystyna Nowakowska; Legia Warsaw	5:23,3	Zofia Walasek; Start Katowice	5:26,0	Maria Gołębiowska; LZS Morze Gdańsk	5:26,4
Żyrardów 1962	1.2 km	Krystyna Nowakowska; Legia Warsaw	3:33,0	Henryka Staneta; Budowlani Kielce	3:37,5	Krystyna Baliszewska; Legia Warsaw	3:49,8
Puławy 1963	1.2 km	Henryka Jóźwik; Budowlani Kielce	3:46,0	Krystyna Nowakowska; Legia Warsaw	3:46,8	Maria Mróz; Budowlani Bydgoszcz	3:53,0
Zielona Góra 1964	1.2 km	Krystyna Nowakowska; Legia Warsaw	3:25,0	Danuta Sobieska; Gwardia Olsztyn	3:30,0	Maria Mróz; Budowlani Bydgoszcz	3:31,0
Sopot 1965	1.5 km	Danuta Sobieska; Gwardia Olsztyn	4:44,8	Henryka Jóźwik; Budowlani Kielce	4:46,0	Krystyna Nowakowska; Legia Warsaw	4:46,2
Otwock 1966	1.2 km	Danuta Sobieska; Gwardia Olsztyn	3:44,4	Maria Mróz; Budowlani Bydgoszcz	3:44,9	Janina Piórko; Lechia Gdańsk	3:45,6
Otwock 1967	1.2 km	Danuta Sobieska; Gwardia Olsztyn	3:52,3	Teresa Jędrak; Jagiellonia Białystok	3:52,4	Janina Piórko; Lechia Gdańsk	3:54,4
Ostrzeszów 1968	1.8 km	Danuta Sobieska; Gwardia Olsztyn	5:26,6	Zofia Kołakowska; Spójnia Warsaw	5:27,2	Elżbieta Skowrońska; Spójnia Warsaw	5:28,0
Otwock 1969	2.0 km	Zofia Kołakowska; Spójnia Warsaw	6:45,6	Elżbieta Skowrońska; Spójnia Warsaw	6:46,0	Janina Piórko; Lechia Gdańsk	6:46,6
Sanok 1970	2.0 km	Zofia Kołakowska; Spójnia Warsaw	7:28,4	Krystyna Sładek; Pogoń Ruda Śląska	7:31,0	Bronisława Doborzyńska; Zjednoczeni Olsztyn	7:37,8
Ostrzeszów 1971	2.5 km	Barbara Tkaczyk; Olimpia Poznań	7:48,4	Helena Czerwczak; Zawisza Bydgoszcz	7:49,6	Bronisława Doborzyńska; Zjednoczeni Olsztyn	7:56,8
Nowa Huta 1972	3.0 km	Bronisława Doborzyńska; Zjednoczeni Olsztyn	9:45,2	Helena Czerwczak; Zawisza Bydgoszcz	9:50,6	Jadwiga Drążek; Start Lublin	9:57,6
Zalesie Dolne 1973	4.0 km	Bronisława Doborzyńska; Zjednoczeni Olsztyn	14:03,0	Maria Linkowska; AZS Poznań	14:12,4	Renata Pentlinowska; Neptun Gdańsk	14:43,2
Kielce 1974	2.0 km	Czesława Surdel; Budowlani Szczecin	5:45,0	Zofia Kołakowska; Gwardia Olsztyn	5:50,8	Barbara Rubaszewska; Budowlani Bydgoszcz	5:54,2
Kielce 1974	4.0 km	Bronisława Ludwichowska; Gwardia Olsztyn	13:01,6	Renata Pentlinowska; Neptun Gdańsk	13:13,2	Jadwiga Czyż; Nadodrze Zielona Góra	13:27,2
Ostrzeszów 1975	2.0 km	Czesława Surdel; Budowlani Szczecin	7:35,2	Celina Magala; Budowlani Kielce	7:36,0	Anna Bełtowska; AZS Kraków	7:37,4
Ostrzeszów 1975	4.0 km	Bronisława Ludwichowska; Gwardia Olsztyn	13:21,2	Renata Pentlinowska; Neptun Gdańsk	13:37,0	Monika Geisler; Gwardia Warsaw	13:47,0
Poznań 1976	2.0 km	Celina Magala; Budowlani Kielce	7:13,2	Jolanta Januchta; AZS Poznań	7:18,6	Anna Bełtowska; AZS Kraków	7:26,0
Poznań 1976	4.0 km	Urszula Prasek; Pomorze Stargard	15:28,0	Renata Pentlinowska; Neptun Gdańsk	15:43,2	Monika Geisler; Gwardia Warsaw	15:54,2
Tarnów 1977	3.0 km	Bronisława Ludwichowska; Gwardia Olsztyn	10:04,4	Celina Sokołowska; Wisła Kraków	10:13,4	Ewa Kuty; Oleśniczanka Oleśnica	10:17,8
Oleśnica 1978	3.0 km	Celina Sokołowska; Wisła Kraków	10:48,0	Krystyna Zając; Górnik Wałbrzych	10:49,4	Monika Geisler; Gwardia Warsaw	10:56,8
Kielce 1979	2.5 km	Celina Sokołowska; Wisła Kraków	7:06,0	Ewa Szydłowska; Piast Gliwice	7:16,0	Renata Kokowska; Orzeł Wałcz	7:22,0
Kielce 1979	5.0 km	Bronisława Ludwichowska; Gwardia Olsztyn	14:24,4	Krystyna Zając; Górnik Wałbrzych	14:29,2	Gabriela Górzyńska; Zawisza Bydgoszcz	14:41,8
Burzenin 1980	2.5 km	Renata Kokowska; Orzeł Wałcz	8:12,1	Stanisława Fedyk; Śląsk Wrocław	8:25,4	Wanda Panfil; Lechia Tomaszów Maz.	8:29,6
Burzenin 1980	5.0 km	Bronisława Ludwichowska; Gwardia Olsztyn	16:01,4	Gabriela Górzyńska; Zawisza Bydgoszcz	16:23,2	Krystyna Wierkowicz; KS Olkusz	16:28,9
Warsaw 1981	2.0 km	Celina Sokołowska; Wisła Kraków	6:19	Urszula Heldt; Piast Gliwice	6:22	Ewa Szydłowska; Piast Gliwice	6:24
Warsaw 1981	3.5 km	Wanda Panfil; Lechia Tomaszów Maz.	12:26	Gabriela Górzyńska; Zawisza Bydgoszcz	12:29	Stanisława Fedyk; Śląsk Wrocław	12:38
Piła 1982	4.0 km	Maria Bąk; Pomorze Stargard	14:13,4	Renata Kokowska; Orzeł Wałcz	14:15,2	Ewa Wrzosek; Pomorze Stargard	14:20,4
Poznań 1983	4.0 km	Gabriela Górzyńska; Zawisza Bydgoszcz	14:20,6	Maria Bąk; Pomorze Stargard	14:22,5	Czesława Mentlewicz; Kłos Olkusz	14:22,5
Elbląg 1984	4.0 km	Wanda Panfil; Lechia Tomaszów Maz.	13:19	Lidia Camberg; Kolejarz Katowice	13:22	Gabriela Górzyńska; Zawisza Bydgoszcz	13:26
Pionki 1985	4.0 km	Wanda Panfil; Lechia Tomaszów Maz.	15:36	Maria Bąk; Pomorze Stargard	15:50	Ewa Szydłowska; Bałtyk Gdynia	16:03
Warsaw 1986	4.0 km	Renata Kokowska; Orzeł Wałcz	14:22	Lidia Camberg; AZS Katowice	14:33	Małgorzata Birbach; Gwardia Olsztyn	14:39
Warsaw 1987	4.0 km	Wanda Panfil; Lechia Tomaszów Maz.	11:33	Renata Kokowska; Orzeł Wałcz	11:36	Anna Iskra; Agros Zamość	11:45
Żagań 1988	4.0 km	Małgorzata Birbach; Gwardia Olsztyn	14:49	Grażyna Kowina; Kłos Olkusz	15:05	Anna Dobrowolska; OKS Otwock	15:09
Ostrów Wlkp. 1989	3.0 km	Katarzyna Rybińska; Pomorze Stargard		Wioletta Kryza; AZS Olsztyn		Barbara Towpik; Gryf Słupsk	
Ostrów Wlkp. 1989	6.0 km	Irena Czuta; Technik Komorno		Lidia Camberg; AZS-AWF Katowice		Małgorzata Birbach; Gwardia Olsztyn	
Olsztyn 1990	3.5 km	Małgorzata Birbach; Gwardia Olsztyn	12:12	Wioletta Kryza; AZS Olsztyn	12:17	Małgorzata Sobańska; Olimpia Poznań	12:22
Olsztyn 1990	7.0 km	Irena Czuta; Technik Komorno	24:58	Izabela Zatorska; Tajfun Krosno	25:11	Anna Rybicka; AZS-AWF Wrocław	25:20
Skarżysko-Kamienna 1991	3.0 km	Grażyna Kowina; Kłos Olkusz	11:41	Małgorzata Sobańska; Olimpia Poznań	11:45	Elżbieta Nadolna; Orkan Poznań	12:00
Skarżysko-Kamienna 1991	6.0 km	Izabela Zatorska; Tajfun Krosno	22:56	Wioletta Kryza; AZS Olsztyn	23:03	Irena Czuta; Technik Komorno	23:23
Kędzierzyn 1992	3.0 km	Iwona Klimczak; Gwardia Olsztyn	10:02	Dorota Gruca; Agros Zamość	10:05	Beata Monica; Victoria Racibórz	10:07
Kędzierzyn 1992	6.0 km	Irena Czuta; Technik Komorno	20:15	Danuta Marczyk; LZS Koluszki	20:42	Aniela Nikiel; Sprint Bielsko-Biała	20:50
Płock 1993	3.0 km	Beata Monica; Victoria Racibórz	10:37	Karina Szymańska; LZS Wąbrzeźno	10:54	Marta Kosmowska; Start Skierniewice	10:57
Płock 1993	6.0 km	Irena Czuta; Technik Komorno	21:25	Danuta Marczyk; LZS Koluszki	21:35	Renata Sobiesiak; Polkolor Piaseczno	22:20
Bydgoszcz 1994	5.0 km	Aniela Nikiel; Piast Cieszyn	18:17	Irena Czuta; Technik Komorno	18:19	Janina Malska; Kłos Olkusz	18:39
Sopot 1995	5.0 km	Dorota Gruca; Agros Zamość	17:45	Wioletta Kryza; AZS Olsztyn	17:48	Danuta Marczyk; LZS Koluszki	17:51
Oleśnica 1996	5.0 km	Izabela Zatorska; Krośnianka Krosno	19:36	Wioletta Kryza; AZS Olsztyn	19:44	Dorota Gruca; Agros Zamość	19:56
Strzelce Krajeńskie-Długie 1997	5.0 km	Justyna Bąk; Znicz Biłgoraj	15:08	Renata Paradowska; Eris Piaseczno	15:20	Joanna Karpińska; Maraton Świnoujście	15:32
Międzyzdroje 1998	4.6 km	Wioletta Kryza; AZS-ART Olsztyn	16:01	Dorota Gruca; Agros Zamość	16:12	Małgorzata Jamróz; Eris Piaseczno	16:18
Żagań 1999	4.8 km	Justyna Bąk; Znicz Biłgoraj	14:30	Krystyna Pieczulis; AZS-AWF Katowice	14:33	Małgorzata Sobańska; AZS-AWF Wrocław	14:34
Chorzów 2000	4.5 km	Justyna Bąk; Znicz Biłgoraj	15:34	Wioletta Kryza; AZS-UWM Olsztyn	15:36	Grażyna Syrek; Olimpia Poznań	16:10
Kraków 2001	4.0 km	Justyna Bąk; Skra Warsaw	15:03	Marzena Michalska; Wawel Kraków	15:23	Grażyna Syrek; Olimpia Poznań	15:30
Poznań 2002	4.0 km	Dorota Ustianowska; MLKS Goświnowice	13:44	Grażyna Syrek; Olimpia Poznań	13:49	Edyta Lewandowska; RKS Łódź	13:51
Międzyzdroje 2002	4.0 km	Grażyna Syrek; Olimpia Poznań	16:18	Edyta Lewandowska; RKS Łódź	16:22	Justyna Lesman; Olimpia Poznań	16:33
Kwidzyn 2004	4.0 km	Justyna Bąk; Skra Warsaw	13:27	Małgorzata Jamróz; Warszawianka	13:30	Beata Monica-Szyjka; Victoria Racibórz	13:40
Police 2005	4.0 km	Justyna Lesman; Olimpia Poznań	14:10	Małgorzata Sobańska; Dąb Kozienice	14:23	Marzena Kłuczyńska; Orkan Poznań	14:28
Wejherowo 2006	4.0 km	Justyna Lesman; Olimpia Poznań	14:02	Małgorzata Jamróz; Warszawianka	14:20	Barbara Niewiedział; MGOKSiR Korfantów	14:26
Bydgoszcz 2007	4.0 km	Justyna Bąk; NKS Namysłów	13:22	Katarzyna Kowalska; Vectra Włocławek	13:27	Justyna Mudy; AZS-AWF Katowice	14:01
Kwidzyn 2008	4.0 km	Katarzyna Kowalska; Vectra Włocławek	13:14	Dominika Główczewska; SKLA Sopot	13:33	Agnieszka Ciołek; AZS-AWF Wrocław	13:54
Olszyna 2009	3.0 km	Angelika Cichocka; Talex Borzytuchom	10:38	Aleksandra Jakubczak; Agros Zamość	10:42	Maria Maj-Roksz; Wejher Wejherowo	10:46
Olszyna 2009	7.0 km	Katarzyna Kowalska; Vectra-DGS Włocławek	23:30	Mariola Konowalska; Budowlani Częstochowa	24:56	Aleksandra Jawor; Budowlani Częstochowa	24:57
Bydgoszcz 2010	4.0 km	Wioletta Frankiewicz; AZS-AWF Kraków	14:25	Katarzyna Broniatowska; AZS-AWF Kraków	14:41	Anna Wojtulewicz; Podlasie Białystok	14:56
Bydgoszcz 2010	8.0 km	Katarzyna Kowalska; Vectra-DGS Włocławek	28:59	Justyna Bąk; Piętka Katowice	29:16	Agnieszka Jerzyk; KS 64-sto Leszno	30:11
Zamość 2011	4.0 km	Katarzyna Broniatowska; AZS-AWF Kraków	16:18	Matylda Szlęzak; AZS-AWF Kraków	16:22	Izabela Trzaskalska; AZS-UMCS Lublin	17:09
Zamość 2011	8.0 km	Katarzyna Kowalska; Vectra-DGS Włocławek	32:35	Iwona Lewandowska; Vectra-DGS Włocławek	33:20	Urszula Nęcka; Płomień Sosnowiec	33:34
Bydgoszcz 2012	4.0 km	Katarzyna Broniatowska; AZS-AWF Kraków	13:50	Dominika Nowakowska; LKB im. Braci Petk	13:53	Aleksandra Jakubczak; Agros Zamość	13:57
Bydgoszcz 2012	8.0 km	Katarzyna Kowalska; Vectra-DGS Włocławek	27:59	Urszula Nęcka; Płomień Sosnowiec	28:38	Aleksandra Lisowska; AZS-UWM Olsztyn	28:49
Bydgoszcz 2013	4.0 km	Angelika Cichocka; Talex Borzytuchom	13:11	Sylwia Ejdys; Śląsk Wrocław	13:16	Barbara Niewiedział; MGOKSiR Korfantów	13:20
Bydgoszcz 2013	8.0 km	Katarzyna Kowalska; Vectra-DGS Włocławek	26:15	Agnieszka Ciołek; AZS-AWF Wrocław	26:30	Dominika Napieraj; AZS-AWF Wrocław	27:03
Kraków 2014	4.0 km	Mariola Ślusarczyk; UKS Victoria Józefów	13:17	Urszula Nęcka; MKS-MOS Płomień Sosnowiec	13:20	Katarzyna Broniatowska; AZS AWF Kraków	13:25
Kraków 2014	8.0 km	Iwona Lewandowska; LKS Vectra Włocławek	26:13	Katarzyna Kowalska; LKS Vectra Włocławek	26:35	Izabela Trzaskalska; AZS UMCS Lublin	27:45
Iława 2015	5.0 km	Dominika Napieraj; AZS-AWF Wrocław	16:23	Dominika Nowakowska; LKB im. Braci Petk Lębork	16:29	Matylda Kowal; Resovia Rzeszów	16:30
Żagań 2016	5.0 km	Angelika Cichocka; SKLA Sopot	17:13	Iwona Lewandowska; LKS Vectra Włocławek	17:14	Paulina Kaczyńska; WMLKS Pomorze Stargard	17:24
Jelenia Góra 2017	5.0 km	Katarzyna Rutkowska; KS Podlasie Białystok	16:41	Katarzyna Kowalska; LKS Vectra Włocławek	16:57	Angelika Cichocka; SKLA Sopot	17:10
Żagań 2018	5.0 km	Katarzyna Rutkowska; KS Podlasie Białystok	16:25	Katarzyna Broniatowska; KS AZS AWF Kraków	16:44	Aleksandra Brzezińska; MKL Toruń	16:52
Olszyna 2019	4.0 km	Beata Topka; ULKS Talex Borzytuchom	14:43	Ewa Jagielska; LŁKS Prefbet Śniadowo Łomża	15:04	Iwona Wicha; LŁKS Prefbet Śniadowo Łomża	15:12
Olszyna 2019	8.0 km	Katarzyna Kowalska; LKS Vectra Włocławek	29:40	Anna Gosk; KS Podlasie Białystok	29:53	Paulina Kaczyńska; WMLKS Pomorze Stargard	31:06

== Multiple winners ==
=== Men's division ===
Rank	Athlete	Gold	Silver	Bronze	Total
1	Zdzisław Krzyszkowiak	6	2	0	8
2	Stanisław Ożóg	5	3	0	8
3	Mateusz Demczyszak	5	2	0	7
4	Rafał Wójcik	5	1	3	9
5	Henryk Piotrowski	5	1	2	8
6	Edward Łęgowski	5	0	2	7
7	Leszek Bebło	4	4	0	8
8	Artur Osman	4	1	4	9
9	Marian Jochman	4	1	0	5
10=	Marcin Chabowski	4	0	0	4
10=	Tomasz Grycko	4	0	0	4

=== Women's division ===
Rank	Athlete	Gold	Silver	Bronze	Total
1	Katarzyna Kowalska	7	3	0	10
2	Bronisława Ludwichowska	7	0	2	9
3	Justyna Bąk	6	1	0	7
4	Krystyna Nowakowska	5	2	1	8
5	Celina Sokołowska	4	2	0	6
6	Irena Czuta	4	1	1	6
7	Danuta Wierzbowska	4	1	0	5
8	Wanda Panfil-González	4	0	1	5
9	Halina Gabor	4	0	0	4
10=	Angelika Cichocka	3	0	1	4
10=	Jadwiga Kalbarczyk	3	0	1	4
