= Motyka =

Motyka (Ukrainian: Мотика) is a Polish and Ukrainian surname meaning "hoe". Notable people with the surname include:

- Emily Motyka, involved in the killing of Sam Nordquist
- Grzegorz Motyka (born 1967), Polish historian
- Grzegorz Motyka (born 1972), Polish footballer
- Józef Motyka (1900–1984), Polish botanist and lichenologist
- Marek Motyka (born 1958), Polish footballer
- Miłosz Motyka (born 1992), Polish politician
- Stanisław Motyka (1906–1941), Polish skier
- Tomasz Motyka (born 1972), Polish footballer
- Tomasz Motyka (born 1981), Polish fencer
- Zdzisław Motyka (1907–1969), Polish skier

== See also ==
- Motika, Serbo-Croatian cognate
