= Paula Gorycka =

Polish cross-country mountain biker

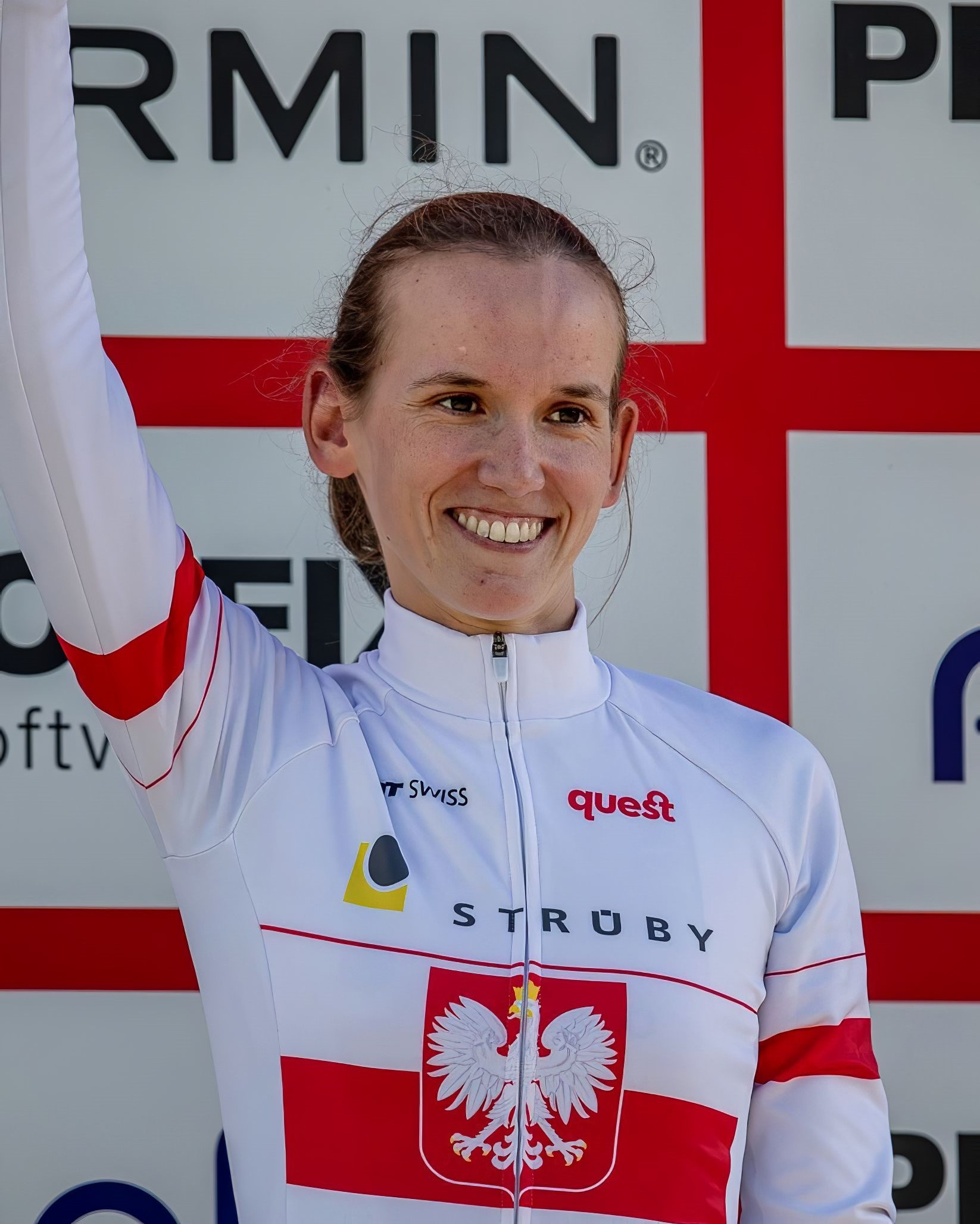
- Finished the Swiss Bike Cup season in 3rd place overall in the elite women's category in 2022

Personal information
- Full name: Paula Gorycka-Kurmann
- Born: 5 November 1990 (age 35) Kraków, Poland

Cycling career
- Sport: Cycling
- Current team: Strüby Sting
- Disciplines: Mountain biking (Cross-country); Cyclo-cross; Road
- Role: Rider
- Rider type: Cross-country

Amateur teams
- 2006-2008: ULKS Sprint Valvex Jordanów
- 2009: DEK Meble Cyclo Korona Kielce
- 2016: Prolog Jabłonna

Professional teams
- 2010-2011: CCC Polkowice (UCI team)
- 2012-2015: 4F Racing Team (Note: Named 4F e-vive Racing Team in 2012 and 4F-Scott Racing Team in 2015) (UCI team)
- Since 2017: Strüby Sting / BiXS (Note: Named from Strüby-BiXS to Strüby Sting in 2023) (UCI team)
Medal record
Women's mountain bike racing
World Under-23 Championships
Bronze medal – third place	2012 Saalfelden	Cross-country
Bronze medal – third place	2010 Mont Sainte Anne	Cross-country
European Under-23 Championships
Silver medal – second place	2012 Moscow	Cross-country

Paula Gorycka (born 5 November 1990 in Kraków) is a Polish cross-country mountain bike, road and cyclo-cross cyclist with two medals from the MTB World Championships and one medal from the MTB European Championships.

== Olympic Games ==
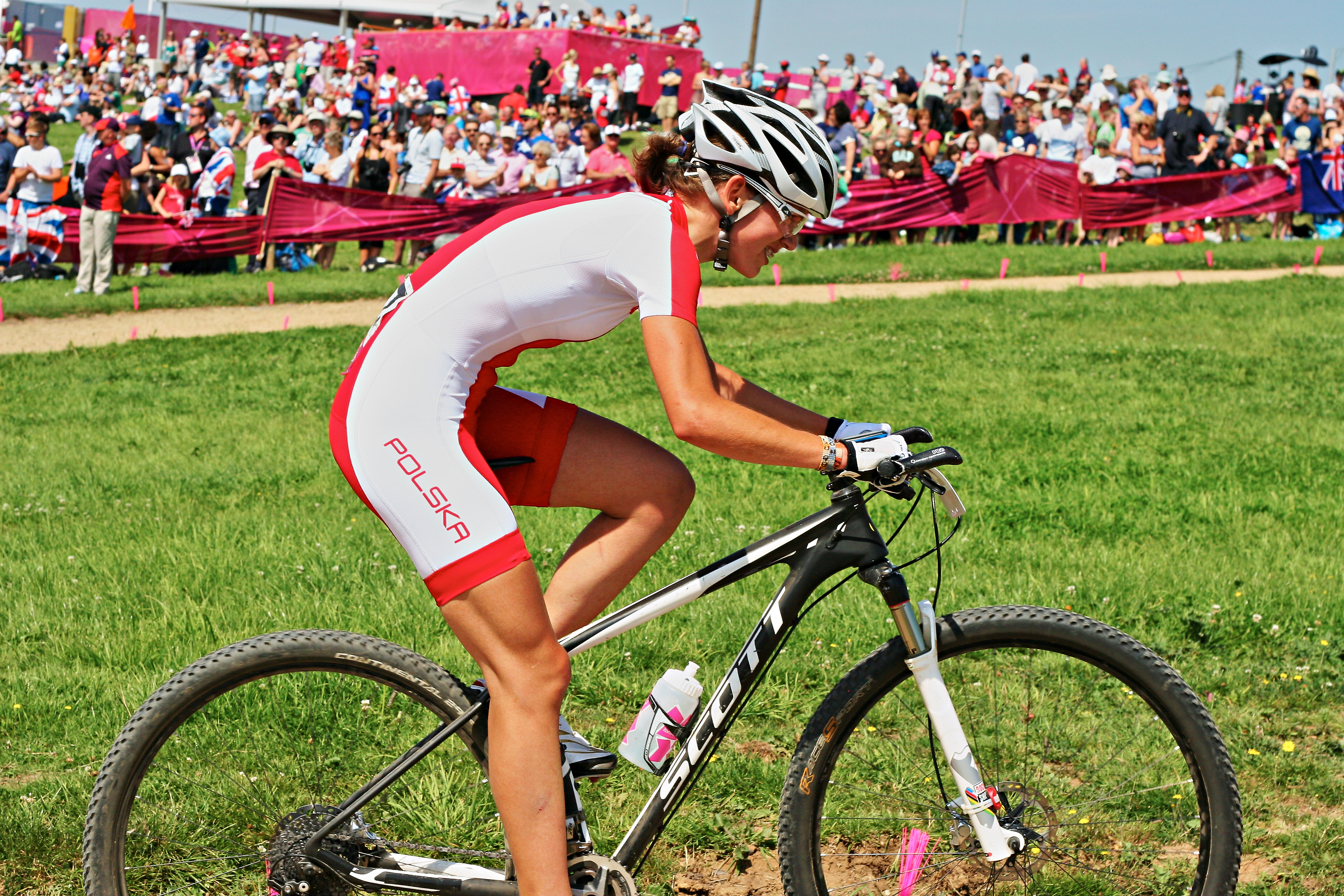
Paula Gorycka XCO women final on London 2012 olympics

In 2012, she finished 22nd in the Olympic Games in London.

Paula Gorycka described her participation in the Olympic Games as follows:

"Participating in the Olympic Games was a fulfillment of my childhood dreams. Of course, I wanted to achieve a better result while being there. I was not satisfied with my 22nd place, but at the same time, I performed similarly to other young athletes who also competed in London. I will continue to work hard to earn another trip to the Olympics, where I hope to compete for a much better result." (Note: Original pl.: "Start w Igrzyskach Olimpijskich był dla mnie spełnieniem dziecięcych marzeń. Oczywiście będąc tam chciałam pojechać po lepszy wynik. Nie byłam zadowolona z 22. miejsca, ale jednocześnie zaprezentowałam się podobnie, co inne zawodniczki z kategorii młodzieżowej, które też startowały w Londynie. Będę pracować dalej, aby zasłużyć sobie na kolejny wyjazd na Igrzyska, na których chciałabym powalczyć o dużo lepszy wynik.")

== World Championships ==
=== Cross Country (XCO) ===
She won two bronze medals at the U23 World Championships in cross-country. In 2010 in Monte Sainte Anne, Canada, and in 2012 in Saalfelden, Austria.

Place	Date	Location	Category
5	18 June 2008	Val di Sole (ITA)	Juniors
7	2 September 2009	Canberra (AUS)	U23
3	3 September 2010	Mont Sainte Anne (CAN)	U23
27	1 September 2011	Champery (SUI)	U23
3	7 September 2012	Saalfelden (AUT)	U23
50	7 September 2014	Hafjell (NOR)	Elite
49	31 August 2015	Vallnord (AND)	Elite
DNS	5 September 2018	Lenzerheide (SUI)	Elite
47	25 August 2021	Val di Sole (ITA)	Elite
33	28 August 2022	Les Gets (FRA)	Elite

=== Short track (XCC) ===
- 13th place in Les Gets (FRA) category Elite on 26 August 2022

=== Team relay (XCR) ===
- 15th place in Les Gets (FRA) category Mixed Elite on 24 August 2022

=== Cyclocross (CX) ===
- 37th place in Tabor (CZE) category Elite on 31 January 2015

== European Championships ==
In 2012, she won a silver medal at the European Championships in the U23 category in Moscow. She finished eight seconds behind the winner, Jolanda Neff.

=== Cross-country (XCO) ===
Place	Date	Location	Category
9	11 July 2009	Zoetermeer (NED)	U23
6	8 July 2010	Haifa (ISR)	U23
8	6 August 2011	Dohnany (SVK)	U23
2	9 June 2012	Moscow (RUS)	U23
24	8 June 2014	Sankt Wendel (GER)	Elite
21	7 August 2018	Glasgow (SCO)	Elite
21	28 July 2019	Brno (CZE)	Elite
27	17 October 2020	Rivera (SUI)	Elite
23	15 August 2021	Novi Sad (SRB)	Elite
23	20 August 2022	Munich (GER)	Elite

=== Marathon (XCM) ===
- 12th place in Singen (GER) category Elite on 10 May 2015

=== Cyclo-cross (CX) ===
- 22nd place in Huijbergen (NED) category Elite on 7 November 2015

=== Road Race (RR) ===
- 15th place in Offida (ITA) category U23 on 16 July 2011

=== Individual Time Trial (ITT) ===
- 21st place in Hooglede Gits (BEL) category U23 on 1 July 2009
- 6th place in Offida (ITA) category U23 on 14 July 2011

== World Cup ==
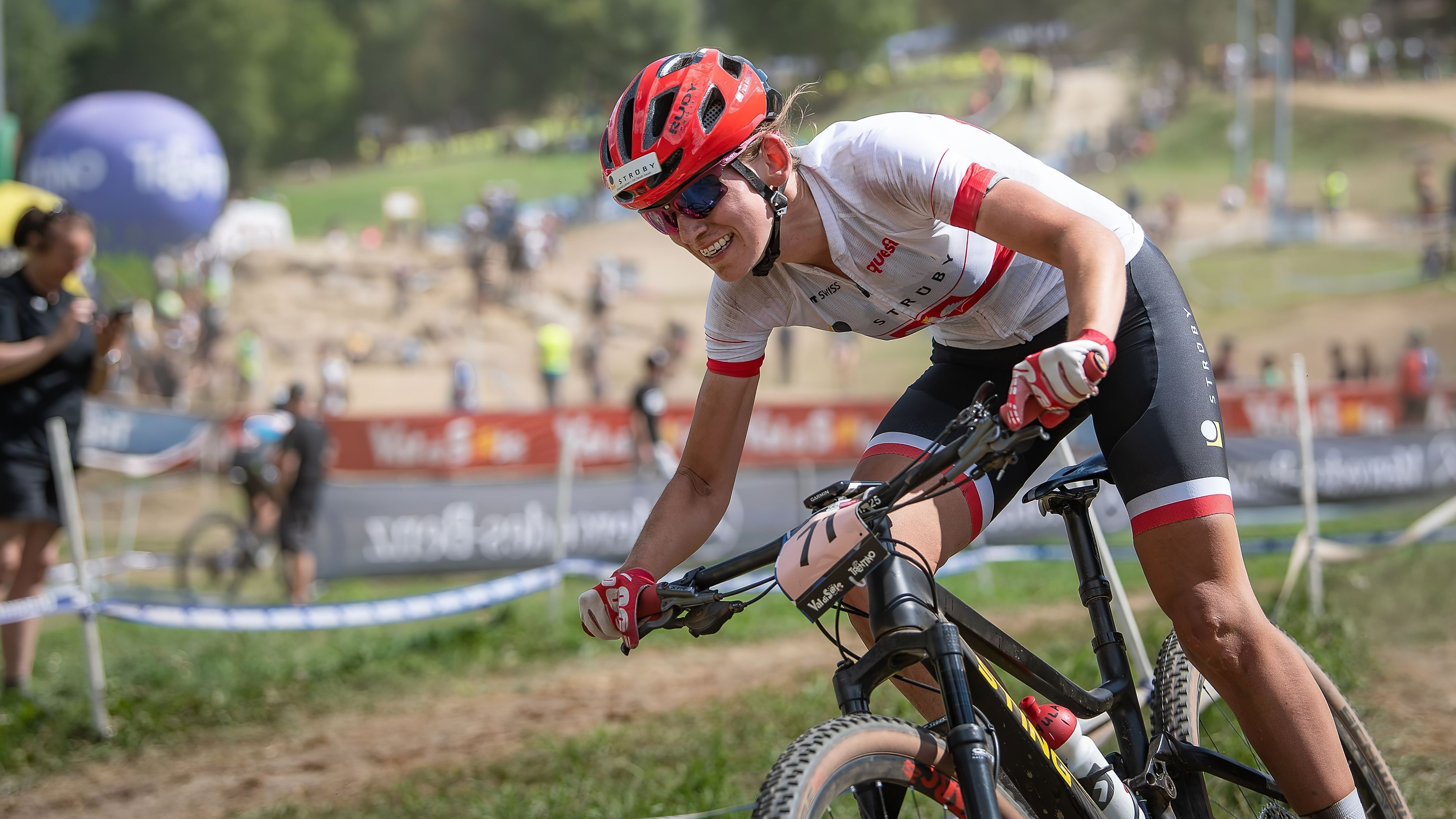
At World Cup XCO in Val di Sole 2022, category elite women

In the U23 category, Paula Gorycka has four podium finishes in the UCI Mountain Bike World Cup. She first reached the podium in her second World Cup race in September 2009 in Schladming, finishing in third place. In April 2011, she took second place in Pietermaritzburg. She was leading the race and had a good chance of winning, but a crash – in which she later found out she had broken her tibia – prevented her from doing so. With a broken leg, she still managed to complete the remaining six kilometers to the finish line. In August 2011, she finished third in the World Cup in Val di Sole. In May 2012, she once again finished in third place, this time at the World Cup in Nove Mesto na Morave.

=== Cross-country (XCO) ===
Results since 2009
Place	Date	Location	Category
41 (12 in U23)	13 September 2009	Champery (SUI)	Elite
21 (3 in U23)	19 September 2009	Schladming (AUT)	Elite
50 (10 in U23)	25 April 2010	Dalby Forest (GBR)	Elite
42 (6 in U23)	2 May 2010	Houffalize (BEL)	Elite
43 (5 in U23)	23 May 2010	Offenburg (GER)	Elite
51 (12 in U23)	25 July 2010	Champery (SUI)	Elite
35 (6 in U23)	31 July 2010	Val di Sole (ITA)	Elite
2	23 April 2011	Pietermaritzburg (RSA)	U23
16	22 May 2011	Dalby Forest (GBR)	U23
21	29 May 2011	Offenburg (GER)	U23
3	20 August 2011	Val di Sole (ITA)	U23
DNF	17 March 2012	Pietermaritzburg (RSA)	U23
5	14 April 2012	Houffalize (BEL)	U23
3	12 May 2012	Nove Mesto na Morave (CZE)	U23
5	19 May 2012	La Bresse (FRA)	U23
30	19 May 2013	Albstadt (GER)	Elite
39	26 May 2013	Nove Mesto na Morave (CZE)	Elite
DNF	15 June 2013	Val di Sole (ITA)	Elite
32	14 September 2013	Hajfell (NOR)	Elite
22	13 April 2014	Pietermaritzburg (RSA)	Elite
27	27 April 2014	Cairns (AUS)	Elite
57	25 May 2014	Nove Mesto na Morave (CZE)	Elite
45	1 June 2014	Albstadt (GER)	Elite
DNF	24 August 2014	Meribel (FRA)	Elite
42	24 May 2015	Nove Mesto na Morave (CZE)	Elite
40	23 August 2015	Val di Sole (ITA)	Elite
65	22 May 2016	Albstadt (GER)	Elite
63	29 May 2016	La Bresse (FRA)	Elite
42	4 September 2016	Vallnord (AND)	Elite
57	20 May 2017	Nove Mesto na Morave (CZE)	Elite
42	28 May 2017	Albstadt (GER)	Elite
55	2 July 2017	Vallnord (AND)	Elite
DNF	9 July 2017	Lenzerheide (SUI)	Elite
33	27 August 2017	Val di Sole (ITA)	Elite
37	10 March 2018	Stellenbosch (RSA)	Elite
52	20 May 2018	Albstadt (GER)	Elite
46	27 May 2018	Nove Mesto na Morave (CZE)	Elite
40	8 July 2018	Val di Sole (ITA)	Elite
48	15 July 2018	Vallnord (AND)	Elite
38	26 August 2018	La Bresse (FRA)	Elite
50	19 May 2019	Albstadt (GER)	Elite
36	26 May 2019	Nove Mesto na Morave (CZE)	Elite
42	7 July 2019	Vallnord (AND)	Elite
48	14 July 2019	Les Gets (FRA)	Elite
44	4 August 2019	Val di Sole (ITA)	Elite
32	11 August 2019	Lenzerheide (SUI)	Elite
34	11 September 2019	Snowshoe (USA)	Elite
50	1 October 2020	Nove Mesto na Morave (CZE)	Elite
51	4 October 2020	Nove Mesto na Morave (CZE)	Elite
77	9 May 2021	Albstadt (GER)	Elite
77	16 May 2021	Nove Mesto na Morave (CZE)	Elite
47	13 June 2021	Leogang (AUT)	Elite
36	4 July 2021	Les Gets (FRA)	Elite
46	5 September 2021	Lenzerheide (SUI)	Elite
40	8 May 2022	Albstadt (GER)	Elite
51	15 May 2022	Nove Mesto na Morave (CZE)	Elite
40	12 June 2022	Leogang (AUT)	Elite
37	10 July 2022	Lenzerheide (SUI)	Elite
39	17 July 2022	Vallnord (AND)	Elite
41	4 September 2022	Val di Sole (ITA)	Elite

=== Eliminator (XCE) ===
Results since 2012
Place	Date	Location	Category
22	13 April 2012	Houffalize (BEL)	Elite
19	11 May 2012	Nove Mesto na Morave (CZE)	Elite
12	25 April 2014	Cairns (AUS)	Elite
24	23 May 2014	Nove Mesto na Morave (CZE)	Elite
10	28 July 2018	Graz (AUT)	Elite

=== Short track (XCC) ===
Results since 2018
Place	Date	Location	Category
28	24 August 2018	La Bresse (FRA)	Elite
31	5 July 2019	Vallnord (AND)	Elite
29	12 July 2019	Les Gets (FRA)	Elite
27	2 August 2019	Val di Sole (ITA)	Elite
26	9 August 2019	Lenzerheide (SUI)	Elite
24	9 September 2019	Snowshoe (USA)	Elite
35	29 September 2020	Nove Mesto na Morave (CZE)	Elite
35	2 October 2020	Nove Mesto na Morave (CZE)	Elite
DNF	11 June 2021	Leogang (AUT)	Elite
DNF	2 July 2021	Les Gets (FRA)	Elite
DNF	3 September 2021	Lenzerheide (SUI)	Elite
28	15 July 2022	Vallnord (AND)	Elite

== European Games ==
In 2015, she placed 15th in the European Games in Baku.

== Polish Championships ==
In the elite category, she has won the Polish National Championships in cross-country twice, in 2012 and 2022, and in 2013 she became the Polish National Champion in cyclo-cross. She has also won national titles as a junior (in 2008 in cross-country and mountainous road race) and as an under-23 rider (in 2010 in road race and mountainous road race, in 2011 in cross-country, and in 2012 in cross-country and individual time trial). In total, she has won 26 medals in the Polish National Championships – 10 gold, 10 silver, and 6 bronze – which she earned in mountain biking in cross-country, marathon, short track, and MTB relay, in cyclo-cross, and in road cycling in road race, individual time trial, mountainous road race, and tandem time trial.

=== Cross-country (XCO) ===
Place	Date	Location	Category
4	26 August 2007	Szczawno Zdrój (POL)	Junior
1	27 July 2008	Kielce (POL)	Junior
7 (4 in U23)	19 July 2009	Kielce (POL)	Elite
5 (2 in U23)	18 July 2010	Wałbrzych (POL)	Elite
6 (1 in U23)	19 June 2011	Kielce (POL)	Elite
1 (1 in U23)	8 July 2012	Kielce (POL)	Elite
5	7 July 2013	Żerków (POL)	Elite
3	20 July 2014	Żerków (POL)	Elite
5	19 July 2015	Sławno (POL)	Elite
8	16 July 2016	Gielniów (POL)	Elite
6	16 July 2017	Warsaw (POL)	Elite
5	22 July 2018	Mrągowo (POL)	Elite
3	21 July 2019	Mrągowo (POL)	Elite
5	16 August 2020	Mrągowo (POL)	Elite
3	8 August 2021	Boguszów Gorce (POL)	Elite
1	24 July 2022	Boguszów Gorce (POL)	Elite

=== Short track (XCC) ===
- 3rd place in Jelenia Góra (POL) category Elite on 24 September 2021
- 2nd place in Boguszów Gorce (POL) category Elite on 22 July 2022

=== Marathon (XCM) ===
- 2nd place in Wałbrzych (POL) category Elite on 27 September 2009

=== Team relay (XCR) ===
- 2nd place in Kielce (POL) category Mixed Elite on 17 July 2009
- 2nd place in Żerków (POL) category Mixed Elite on 6 July 2013
- 7th place in Sławno (POL) category Mixed Elite on 13 August 2016

=== Cyclo-cross (CX) ===
- 2nd place in Koziegłowy (POL) category Elite on 13 January 2013
- 1st place in Bieganów (POL) category Elite on 12 January 2014
- 2nd place in Bytów (POL) category Elite on 11 January 2015
- 8th place in Sławno (POL) category Elite on 8 January 2017

=== Road cycling – road race (RR) ===
- 6th place (1st in U23) in Kielce (POL) category Elite on 26 June 2010
- 27th place (13th in U23) in Złotoryja (POL) category Elite on 25 June 2011
- 24th place (14th in U23) in Sędziszów (POL) category Elite on 23 June 2012
- 13th place in Świdnica (POL) category Elite on 25 June 2016

=== Road cycling – individual time trial (ITT) ===
- 8th place (4th in U23) in Kielce (POL) category Elite on 24 June 2010
- 7th place (3rd in U23) in Złotoryja (POL) category Elite on 23 June 2011
- 2nd place (1st in U23) in Jędrzejów (POL) category Elite on 21 June 2012
- 16th place in Świdnica (POL) category Elite on 22 June 2016

=== Road cycling – mountain race ===
- 1st place in Podgórzyn (POL) category Junior on 2 August 2008
- 2nd place (1st in U23) in Podgórzyn (POL) category Elite on 11 July 2010
- 3rd place in Jelenia Góra (POL) category Elite on 24 August 2013
- 4th place in Jelenia Góra (POL) category Elite on 30 August 2014
- Did not finish (DNF) in Jelenia Góra (POL) category Elite on 12 September 2015

=== Road cycling – team time trial ===
- 2nd place in Grudziądz (POL) category Elite on 28 September 2012
- Did not finish (DNF) in Opatówek (POL) category Elite on 3 October 2015

== Swiss Bike Cup ==
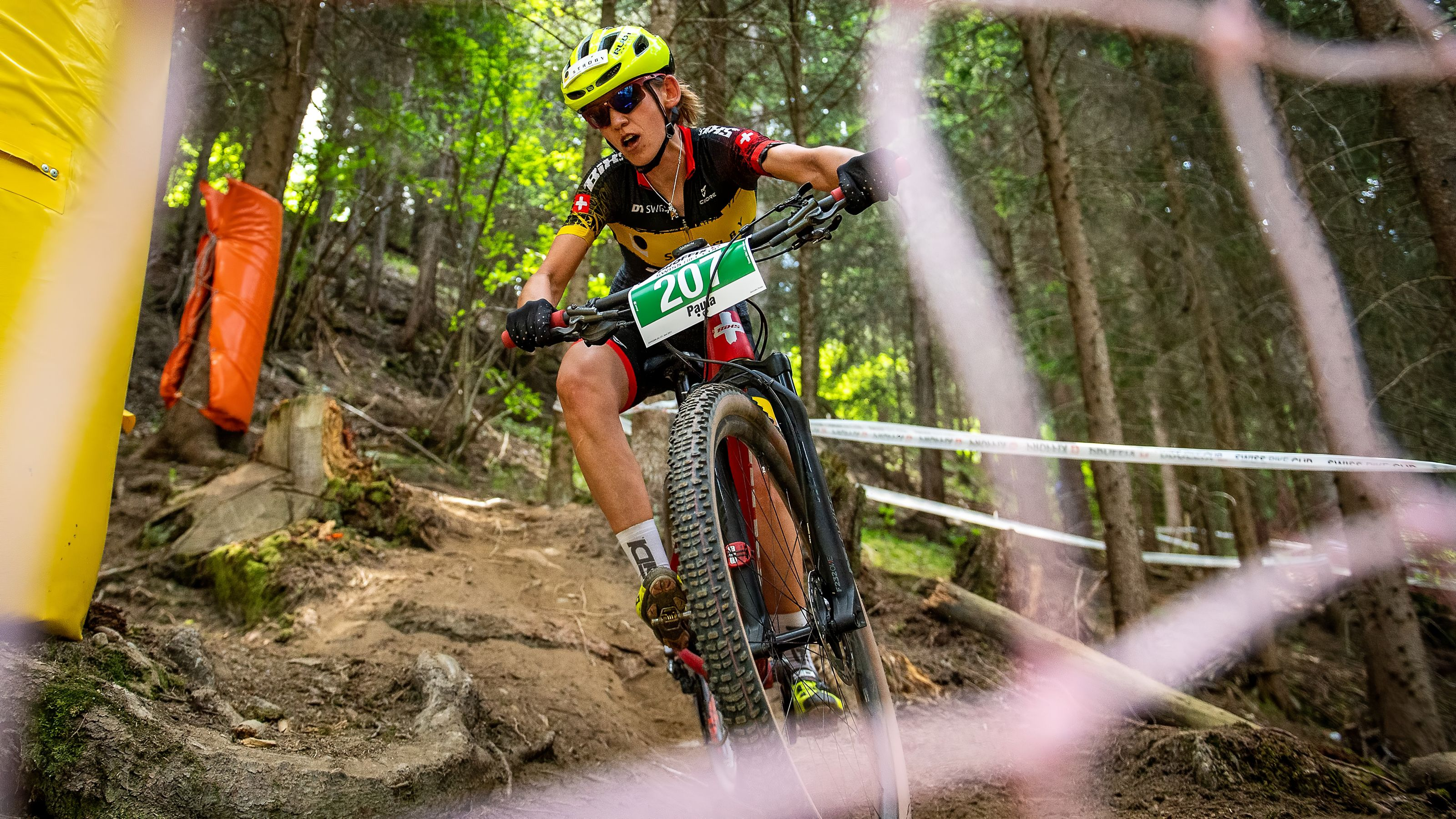
Swiss Bike Cup in Savognin, 27 June 2021, 9th place, elite women

Since 2017, when she joined the Swiss team Strüby Sting, (Note: Formerly known as Strüby-BiXS from 2017-2022) Paula has regularly competed in the Swiss Bike Cup series. (Note: Swiss Bike Cup series has undergone several name changes: Strom Cup, Swisspower Cup, Racer Bikes Cup, Proffix Swiss Bike Cup) In earlier seasons, she only sporadically participated in the series. In 2019, she achieved second place in the overall classification of the series, and in the 2022 season, she finished on the third step of the podium in the general classification.

Results since 2012
Place	Date	Location	Category	Race Class
13	26 August 2012	SUI, Basel	Elite	C1
11	9 June 2013	SUI, Gränichen	Elite	HC
15	16 August 2015	SUI, Basel	Elite	C1
23	28 August 2016	SUI, Basel	Elite	HC
9	9 April 2017	SUI, Rivera	Elite	HC
11	6 May 2017	SUI, Solothurn	Elite	C1
19	10 June 2017	SUI, Gränichen	Elite	HC
12	25 June 2017	SUI, Andermatt	Elite	C1
20	20 August 2017	SUI, Basel	Elite	HC
17	8 April 2018	SUI, Rivera	Elite	C1
7	22 April 2018	LIE, Schaan	Elite	C1
15	5 May 2018	SUI, Solothurn	Elite	C1
DNF	3 June 2018	SUI, Gränichen	Elite	HC
23	2 September 2018	SUI, Basel	Elite	HC
5	7 April 2019	SUI, Rivera	Elite	C1
9	14 April 2019	SUI, Buchs	Elite	C1
8	11 May 2019	SUI, Solothurn	Elite	C1
5	16 June 2019	SUI, Leukerbad	Elite	C1
9	30 June 2019	SUI, Andermatt	Elite	C1
9	18 August 2019	SUI, Basel	Elite	HC
2	22 September 2019	SUI, Lugano	Elite	C3
DNF	21 August 2020	SUI, Gstaad	Elite	C1
7	24 October 2020	SUI, Hochdorf	Elite	C3
DNF	1 May 2021	SUI, Leukerbad	Elite	C1
15	19 June 2021	SUI, Gränichen	Elite	HC
9	26 June 2021	SUI, Savognin	Elite	C1
13	21 August 2021	SUI, Basel	Elite	HC
8	2 October 2021	LIE, Schaan	Elite	C1
3	12 March 2022	SUI, Rickenbach	Elite	C2
6	30 April 2022	SUI, Savognin	Elite	C1
8	18 June 2022	SUI, Gränichen	Elite	HC
4	1 October 2022	SUI, Gstaad	Elite	C1
9	19 March 2023	SUI, Gränichen	Elite	C1
10	15 April 2023	LIE, Schaan	Elite	HC

== ÖKK Bike Revolution ==
Since 2022, a new series of races has appeared in Switzerland – ÖKK Bike Revolution. Paula has been participating in it from the beginning.

Results since 2022
Place	Date	Location	Category	Race class
DNF	27 March 2022	SUI, Rivera	Elite	HC
12	24 April 2022	SUI, Chur	Elite	C1
9	25 September 2022	SUI, Huttwil	Elite	C1
10	26 March 2022	SUI, Rivera	Elite	C1

== Road Races ==
From 2008 to 2016, Paula Gorycka took part in road stage races.

In 2008, during her second year as a junior, she competed in the Tour de Feminin – Krasna Lipa. Although she did not complete the fifth and final stage, she managed to finish 76th, 61st, 81st, and 60th respectively in the other stages (including the individual time trial). This was her first experience in a road stage race. In August of that year, she took part in the International Multi-Stage Cycling Race Fortum in Walbrzych, where she finished seventh in the general classification in the women's open category and was also the first classified junior. Her rankings in the individual stages were 14th (individual time trial), 4th (night criterium), 15th, and 18th.

In 2009, she finished seventh in the general classification of the Grande Boucle Feminine Internationale. She completed individual stages in 10th place (individual time trial), 44th place, 49th place, and 7th place. In August, she finished third in the general classification of the Górski Wałbrzyski Cycling Race. She completed individual stages in 2nd place (individual time trial), 12th place (night criterium), 2nd place, and 18th place.

In 2010, Paula won the Górski Wałbrzyski Cycling Race. She won the first stage (individual time trial) and finished 6th place (night criterium), 3rd place, and 11th place on the following stages.

In 2012, she again finished third in the Górski Wałbrzyski Cycling Race, repeating her result from 2009. She completed individual stages in 4th place (night criterium), 2nd place (individual time trial), 3rd place, and 23rd place.

In 2013, she competed twice in stage races. In the first one – Gracia Orlova, she finished 77th place in the general classification. She finished individual stages in 50th place, 57th place, 37th place (individual time trial), 94th place, 29th place, and 92nd place. She finished the Tour Cycliste Feminin International de l'Ardeche in 62nd place in the general classification. On the following stages, she finished in 113th place, 84th place, 137th place (crash during individual time trial), 68th place, 57th place, 32nd place, and 39th place.

In 2014, completed the Premondiale Giro Toscana Int. Femminile – Memorial Michela Fanini, finishing in 38th place in the general classification. She finished individual stages in 50th place, 39th place, and 41st place.

In 2015, Paula again competed in two road stage races. In the Gracia Orlova race, she finished 11th in the general classification and 17th in the points' classification. She finished individual stages in 12th place, 10th place, 51st place (individual time trial), 34th place, and 49th place. She did not finish the Lotto Belgium Tour race, withdrawing after the third of four stages. Furthermore, she finished the first two stages in 71st and 57th place, respectively.

In 2016, the first edition of the Tour de Pologne Feminin was launched. She finished 48th in the general classification, and on individual stages, she finished 61st, 26th (individual time trial), and 34th.

== Gallery ==
Races of Paula Gorycka

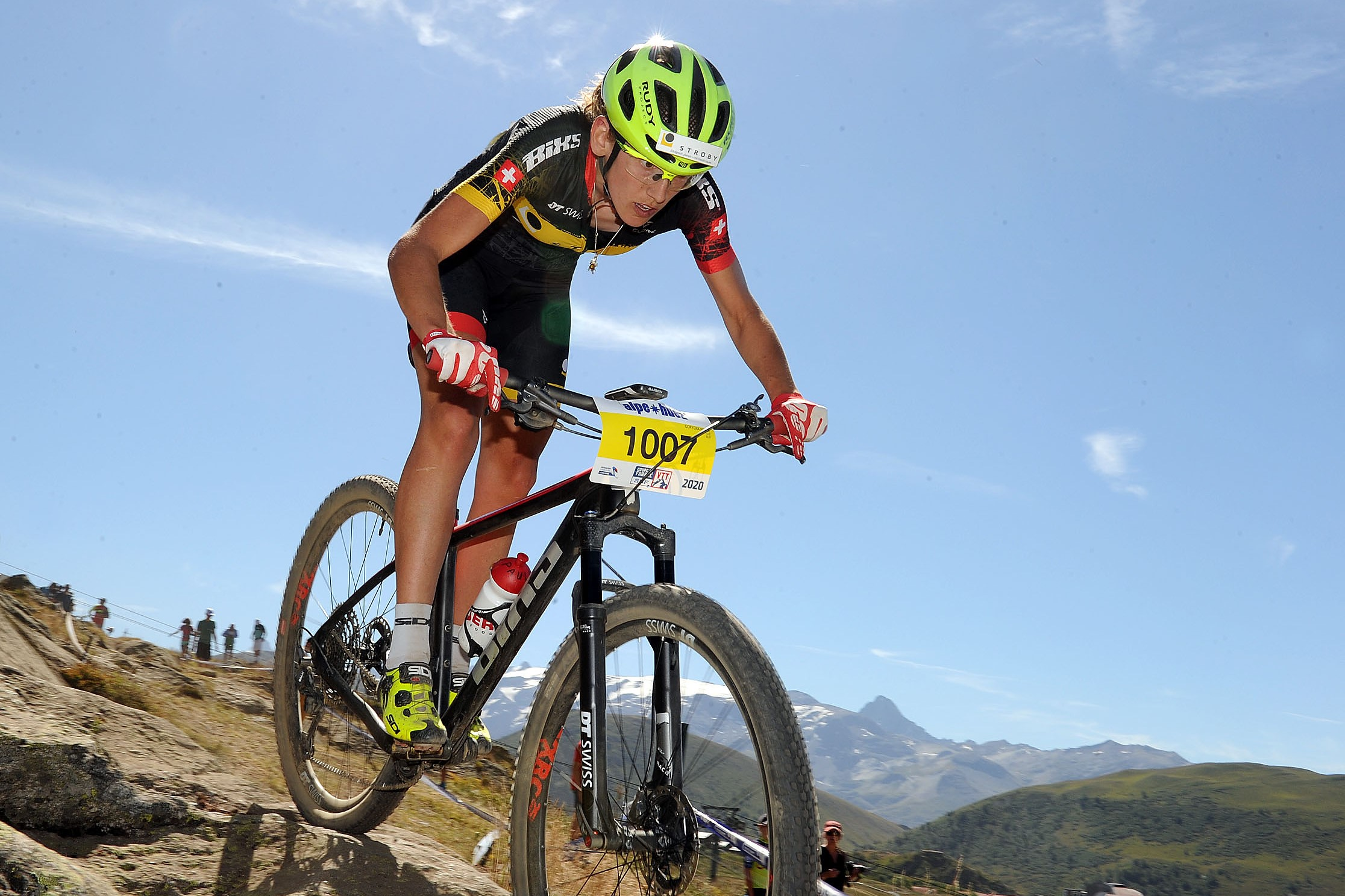
Coupe de France VTT, France, Alpe d’Huez, 8 August 2020, 21st place, elite women

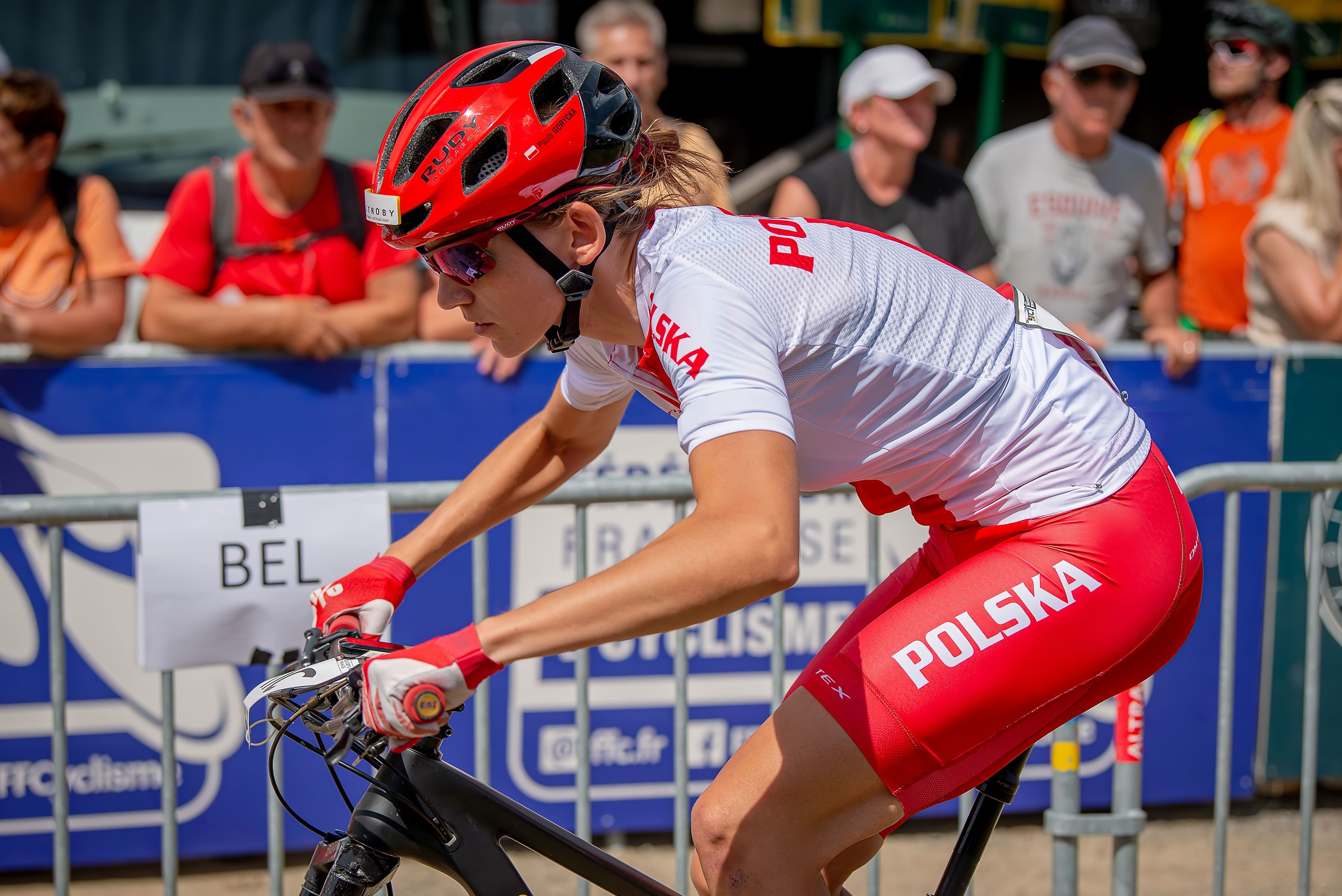
World Championships XCT in Les Gets 24 August 2022, 15th place with team POLAND, mixed elite

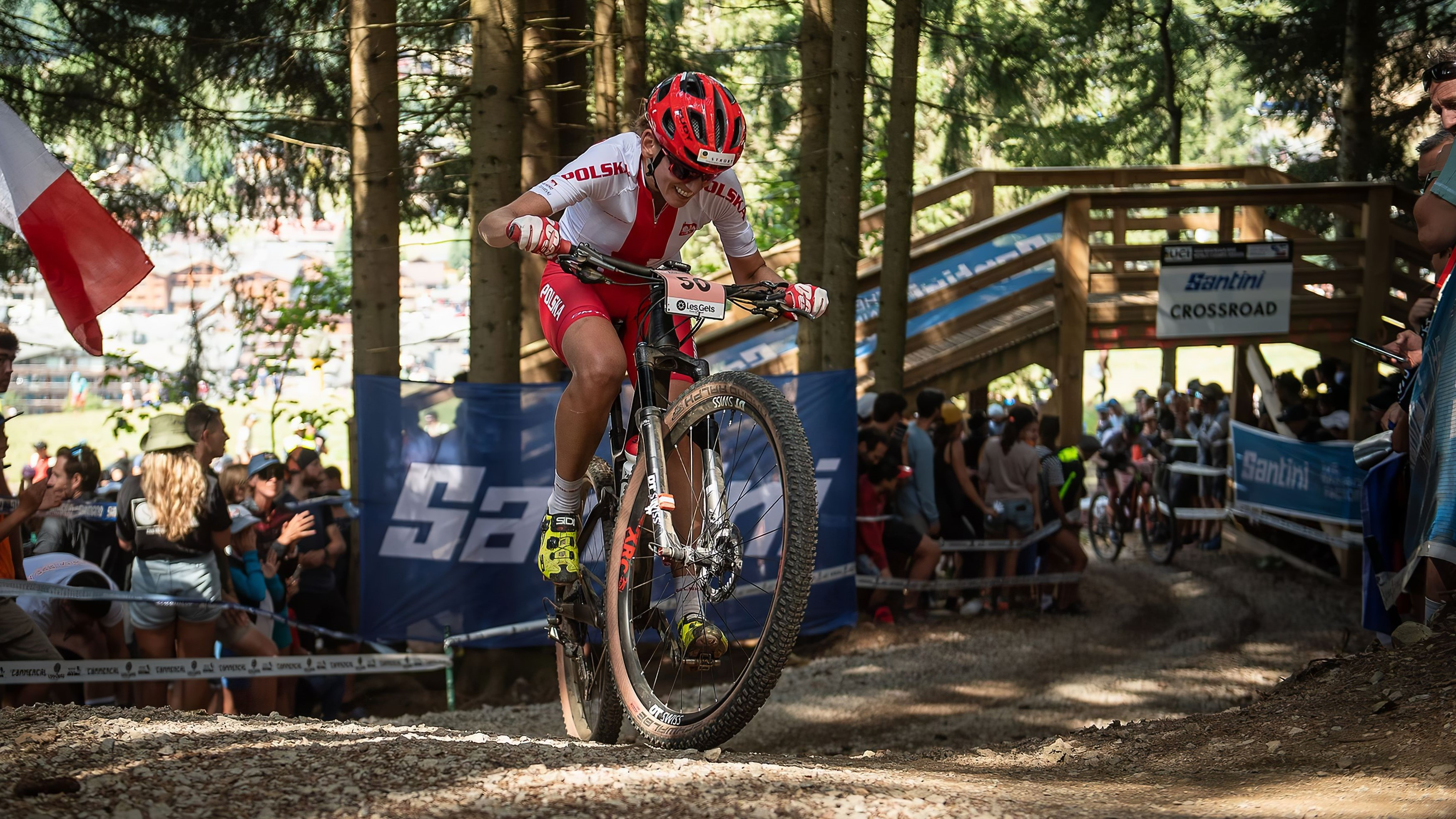
World Championships XCO, France, Les Gets, 28 August 2022, 33rd place, elite women
Training of Paula Gorycka

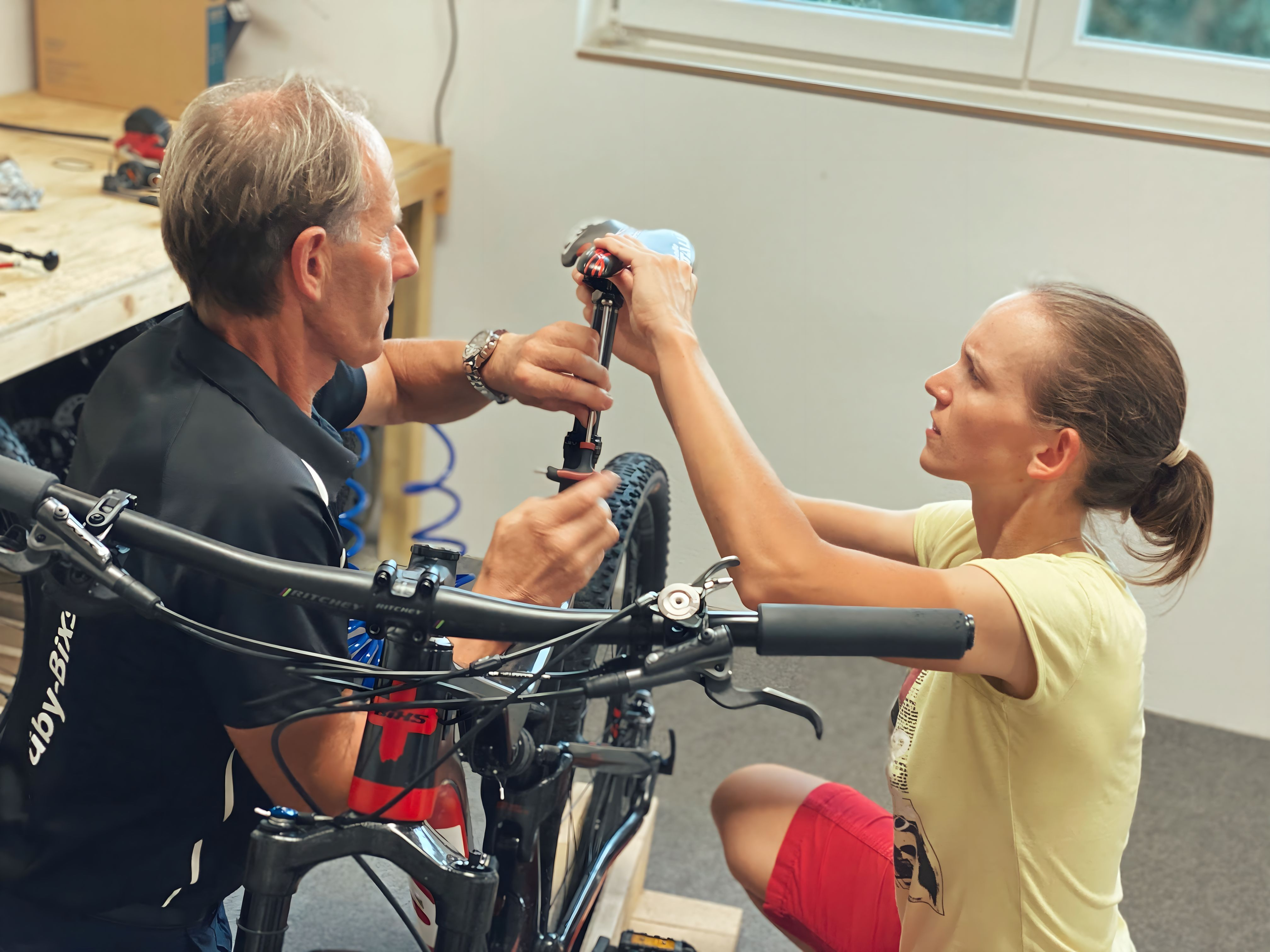
Paula with her trainer Andreas Kurmann (2020)

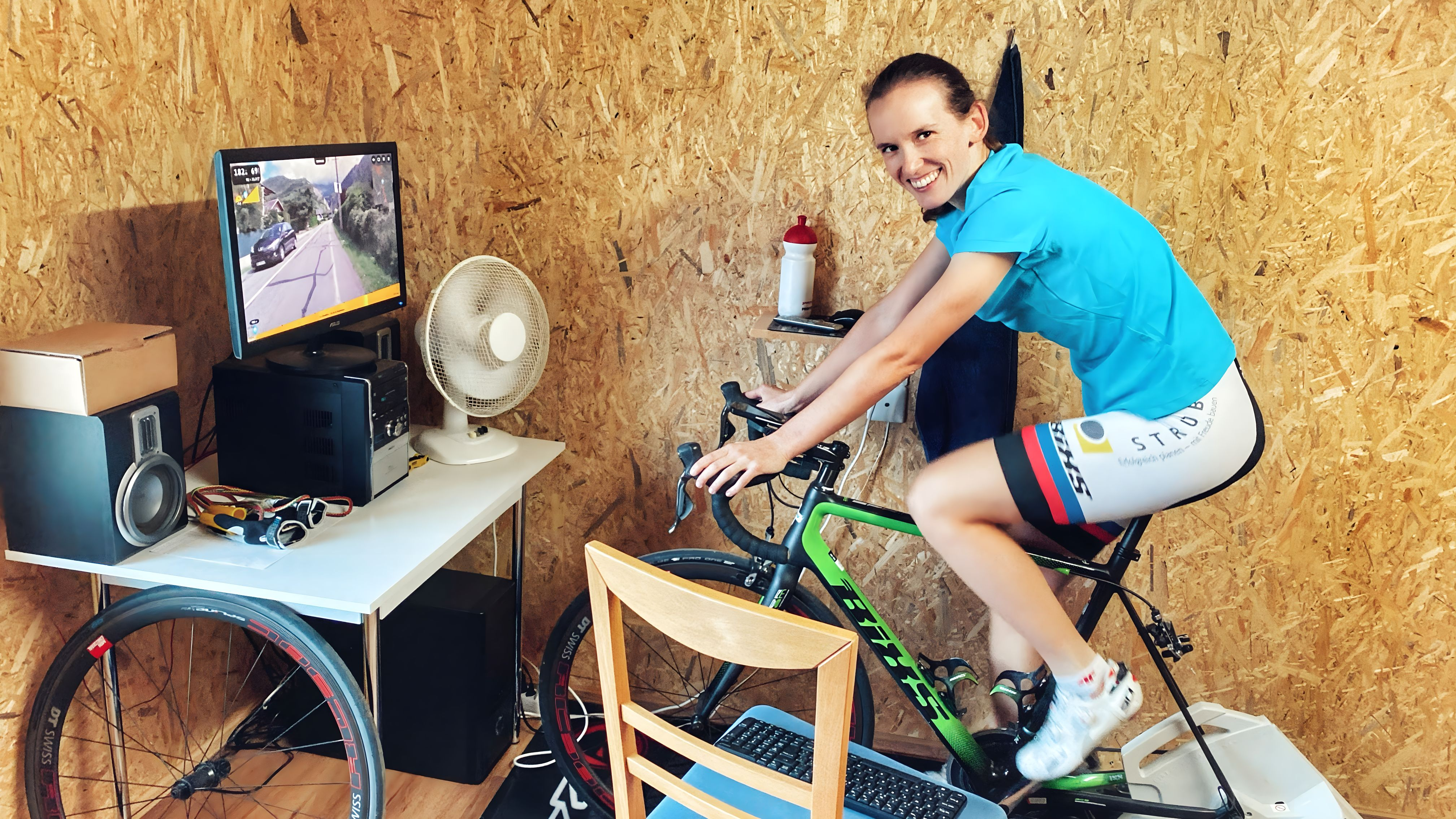
Doing indoor cycling training on a road bike (2019)

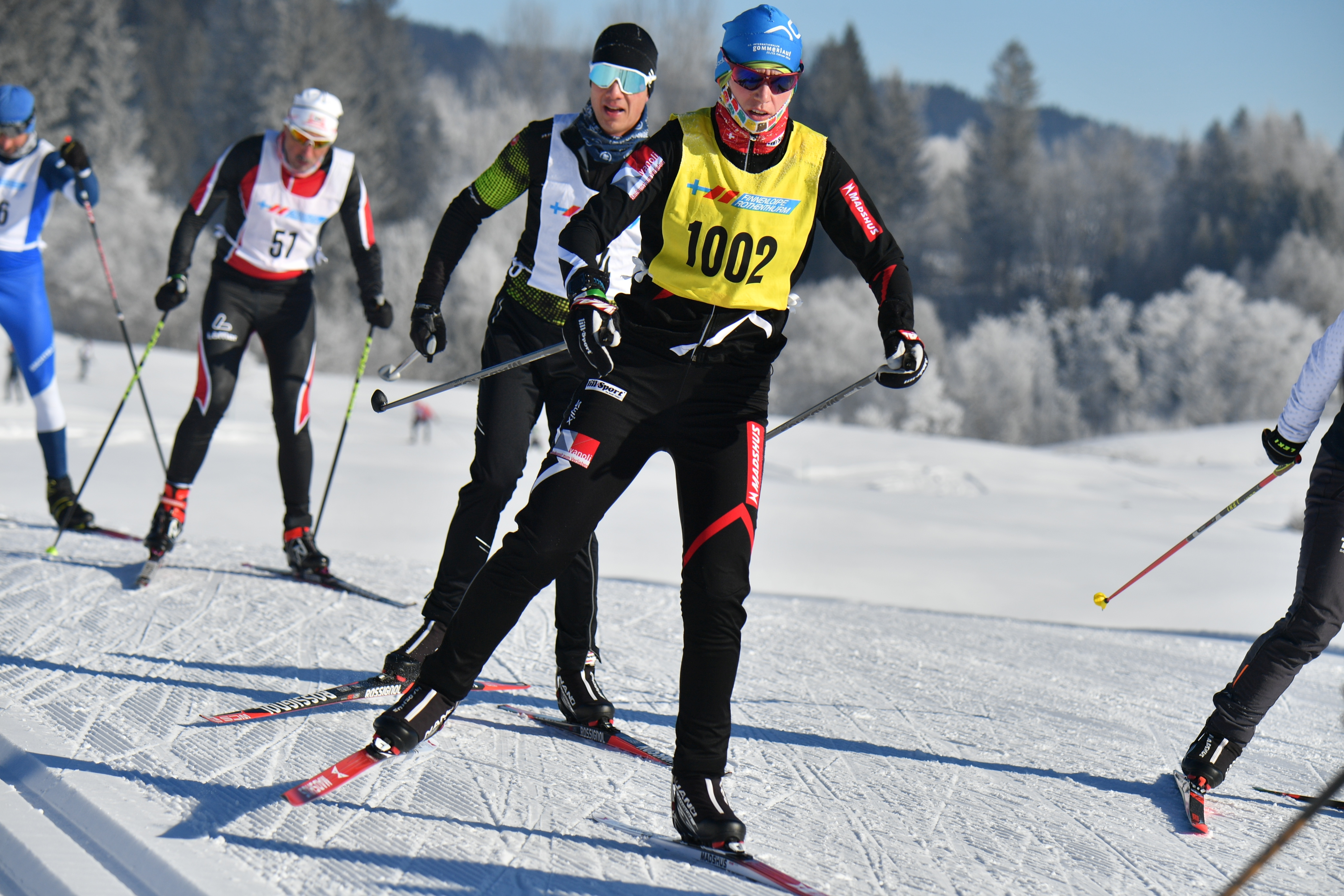
Cross country skiing race Rothenthurmer Volksskilauf on 1 January 2022
