= Sławomir Majusiak =

Polish long-distance runner (1964–2021)

Medal record

Men's athletics

Representing Poland

European Championships
Bronze medal – third place	1990 Split	5000 metres

Sławomir Majusiak (30 May 1964 – 5 December 2021) was a Polish long-distance runner who competed mainly in track running. His greatest achievement was a 5000 metres bronze medal at the 1990 European Athletics Championships. He also represented Poland at the 1989 IAAF World Cross Country Championships and 1991 World Championships in Athletics.

Majusiak was born in Jarocin, Poland. As a young athlete he was a 3000 metres bronze medallist at the 1983 European Athletics Junior Championships, becoming the first Pole to reach the podium in that event. He won the 5000 m at the European Cup B Final.

Despite his international success, he only won one title in his career at the Polish Athletics Championships, topping the podium in the 10,000 metres in 1990. He was also the winner at the Polish Cross Country Championships in 1989 and 1990.

He trained with fellow Polish European medallist Bogusław Mamiński, with a focus on the fartlek method. He retired before the age of thirty due to poor mental health. After athletics he went into business, working at a drinks company with his brothers before moving into real estate.

== Personal bests ==
- 3000 metres – 7:51.58 mins (1990)
- 5000 metres – 13:22.92 mins (1990)
- 10,000 metres – 28:11.50 mins (1990)

All information from All-Athletics.

== International competitions ==
Year	Competition	Venue	Position	Event	Notes
1983	European Junior Championships	Schwechat, Austria	3rd	3000 m	8:03.69
1989	World Cross Country Championships	Stavanger, Norway	139th	Senior race	43:50
1989	World Cross Country Championships	Stavanger, Norway	11th	Team	595 pts
1990	European Championships	Split, Yugoslavia	3rd	5000 m	13:22.92
1990	European Championships	Split, Yugoslavia	—	10,000 m	DNF
1991	European Cup B Final	Barcelona, Spain	1st	5000 m	13:47.14
1991	World Championships	Tokyo, Japan	7th (heats)	5000 m	13:57.98

== National titles ==
- Polish Athletics Championships
  - 10,000 m: 1990
- Polish Cross Country Championships
  - Long race: 1989, 1990

== See also ==
- List of European Athletics Championships medalists (men)
