= Roland Brehmer =

Polish long-distance runner

Personal information
- Nationality: Polish
- Born: 23 June 1943 (age 83) Katowice, present-day Poland

Sport
- Sport: Long-distance running
- Event: 5000 metres

Roland Brehmer (born 23 June 1943) is a Polish long-distance runner. He competed in the men's 5000 metres at the 1968 Summer Olympics.
