= Stefan Szelestowski =

Polish athlete

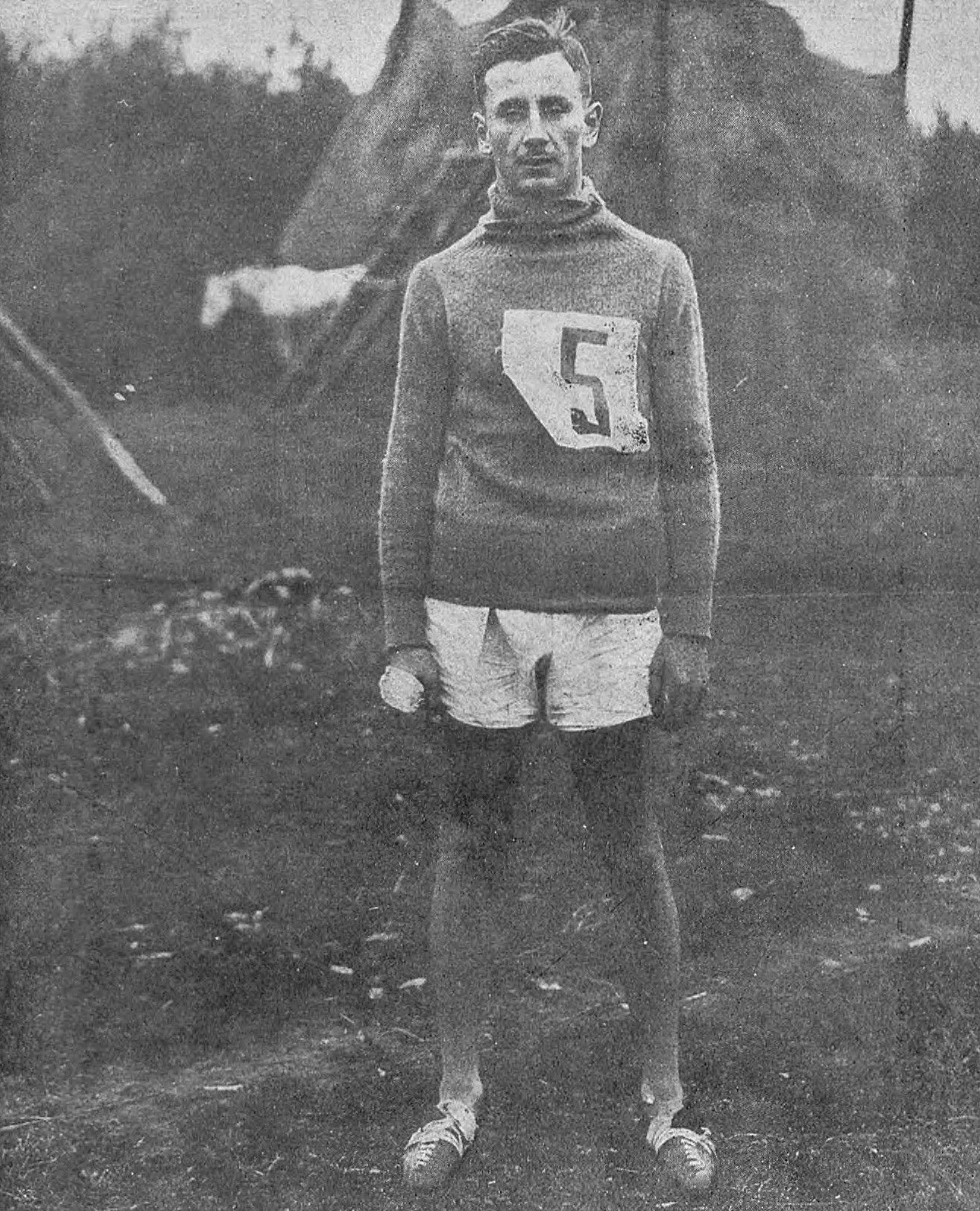
- Stefan Szelestowski in 1924

Personal information
- Born: 11 November 1900 Warsaw, Russian Empire
- Died: 7 October 1987 (aged 86) Gniew, Poland

Sport
- Sport: Long-distance runner, modern pentathlon

Stefan Szelestowski (11 November 1900 – 7 October 1987) was a Polish long-distance runner and modern pentathlete. He competed in the 5000 metres and the 3000 metres team race at the 1924 Summer Olympics. Four years later, he competed in the modern pentathlon at the 1928 Summer Olympics.
