= Stanisław Ożóg (runner) =

Polish long-distance runner

Personal information
- Nationality: Polish
- Born: 11 April 1930 Daszawa, Stanisławów Voivodeship, Poland (present-day Ukraine)
- Died: 25 November 1998 (aged 68) Sulęcin, Poland
- Height: 1.71 m (5 ft 7 in)
- Weight: 59 kg (130 lb)

Sport
- Sport: Long-distance running
- Event: 10,000 metres
- Club: Wawel Kraków

Stanisław Ożóg (11 April 1930 – 25 November 1998) was a Polish long-distance runner. He competed in the men's 10,000 metres at the 1960 Summer Olympics.

== International competitions ==
Year	Competition	Venue	Position	Event	Notes
Representing Poland
1954	European Championships	Bern, Switzerland	13th	10,000 m	30:37.2
1955	World Festival of Youth and Students	Warsaw, Poland	3rd	10,000 m	29:51.8
1958	European Championships	Stockholm, Sweden	5th	10,000 m	29:03.2
1960	Olympic Games	Rome, Italy	18th	10,000 m	29:58.00
1962	European Championships	Belgrade, Yugoslavia	9th	Marathon	2:30:32.2

== Personal bests ==
- 1500 metres – 3:52.2h (Wałcz 1954)
- 3000 metres – 8:03.6h (Warsaw 1958)
- 5000 metres – 13:59.2h (Rzeszów 1959)
- 10 000 metres – 29:03.2h (Stockholm 1958)
- Marathon – 2:30:32.2h (Belgrade 1962)
