= Zofia Walasek =

Polish middle-distance runner (1933–2022)

Personal information
- Nationality: Polish
- Born: 6 January 1933 Nowy Dwór, Kościan County, Poland
- Died: 23 January 2022 (aged 89) Katowice, Poland
- Height: 1.59 m (5 ft 3 in)
- Weight: 51 kg (112 lb)

Sport
- Sport: Middle-distance running
- Event: 800 metres
- Club: Budowlani Chodzież (1847–1948); Warta Poznań (1949–1950); Ogniwo Chodzież (1951–1952); Kolejarz Poznań (1953–1955); Kolejarz Katowice (1955–1957); Start Katowice (1957–1964)

Zofia Walasek (later Walkiewicz; 6 January 1933 – 23 January 2022) was a Polish middle-distance runner. She competed in the women's 800 metres at the 1960 Summer Olympics.

She died in Katowice on 23 January 2022, at the age of 89.

== International competitions ==
Year	Competition	Venue	Position	Event	Notes
Representing Poland
1960	Olympic Games	Rome, Italy	25th (h)	800 m	2:16.44

== Personal bests ==
- 400 metres – 56.7h (1960)
- 800 metres – 2:08.3h (Moscow 1960)
