= Andrzej Sajkowski =

Polish long-distance runner

Andrzej Sajkowski (born 21 May 1952) is a former long-distance runner from Poland, who represented his native country at the 1980 Summer Olympics in Moscow, USSR. He competed in the Olympic marathon but did not finish the race. He was born in Warsaw, Mazowieckie. He set his personal best (2:13:38) in the classic distance in 1980.

== Achievements ==
- All results regarding marathon, unless stated otherwise

| Year | Competition | Venue | Position | Notes |
Representing Poland
| 1980 | Olympic Games | Moscow, Soviet Union | — | DNF |
