= Marian Jochman =

Polish long-distance runner (1935–2020)

Personal information
- Full name: Marian Gerard Jochman
- Nationality: Polish
- Born: 2 February 1935 Toruń, Poland
- Died: 27 December 2020 (aged 85)
- Height: 1.73 m (5 ft 8 in)
- Weight: 62 kg (137 lb)

Sport
- Sport: Long-distance running
- Event: 5000 metres
- Club: Zawisza Bydgoszcz

Marian Gerard Jochman (2 February 1935 – 27 December 2020) was a Polish long-distance runner. He competed in the men's 5000 metres at the 1960 Summer Olympics.

== International competitions ==
Year	Competition	Venue	Position	Event	Notes
Representing Poland
1960	Olympic Games	Rome, Italy	26th (h)	5000 m	14:31.29

== Personal bests ==
- 800 metres – 1:50.5h (Warsaw 1961)
- 1000 metres – 2:23.9h (Bydgoszcz 1957)
- 1500 metres – 3:42.5h (Warsaw 1958)
- 3000 metres – 8:09.6h (Warsaw 1959)
- 5000 metres – 13:54.6h (Warsaw 1958)
