= Motika =

Motika is a surname with multiple origins. In Serbo-Croatian, it means "hoe" and is related to the Polish surname Motyka.

Some notable people with the surname include:

- Antun Motika (1902–1992), Croatian artist
- Nemanja Motika (born 2003), Serbian footballer
- Stephen Motika (born 1977), American poet
