= Jan Kielas =

Polish middle-distance runner

Personal information
- Nationality: Polish
- Born: 9 July 1916 Danzig, German Empire
- Died: 28 April 1997 (aged 80) Gdańsk, Poland
- Height: 1.72 m (5 ft 8 in)
- Weight: 68 kg (150 lb)

Sport
- Sport: Middle-distance running
- Event: Steeplechase
- Club: Sokół Skarszewy (1933–1936); Sokół Bydgoszcz (1937); Gedania Gdańsk (1938, 1946); Zryw Gdańsk (1947–1948); Budowlani–Lechia Gdańsk (1949–1950); Gwardia Gdańsk (1951–1955)

Jan Kielas (9 July 1916 – 28 April 1997) was a Polish middle-distance runner. He competed in the men's 3000 metres steeplechase at the 1952 Summer Olympics.

== International competitions ==
Year	Competition	Venue	Position	Event	Notes
Representing Poland
1952	Olympic Games	Helsinki, Finland	18th (h)	3000 m s'chase	9:15.4

== Personal bests ==
- 1500 metres – 4:02.6h (Wałcz 1952)
- 3000 metres – 8:37.2h (Wałcz 1952)
- 5000 metres – 15:05.8h (Kraków 1952)
- 10,000 metres – 32:03.8h (Warsaw 1953)
- Marathon – 2:42:32.2h (Łódź 1955)
- 3000 metres steeplechase – 9:15.62 (Helsinki 1952)
