= Leszek Bebło =

Polish long-distance runner

Leszek Bebło (born 8 July 1966 in Sokolniki near Tarnobrzeg) is a former long-distance runner from Poland, who represented his native country at two consecutive Summer Olympics, starting in 1992 in Barcelona, Spain. He set his personal best (2:09:42) in the classic distance in 1995.

== Achievements ==
Year	Competition	Venue	Position	Event	Notes
Representing Poland
1992	Olympic Games	Barcelona, Spain	20th	Marathon	2:16:38
1992	Reims Marathon	Reims, France	1st	Marathon	2:11:42
1993	Paris Marathon	Paris, France	1st	Marathon	2:10:46
1993	World Championships	Stuttgart, Germany	—	Marathon	DNF
1995	Reims Marathon	Reims, France	1st	Marathon	2:09:42
1996	Olympic Games	Atlanta, United States	17th	Marathon	2:17.04
