= Małgorzata Birbach =

Polish long-distance runner

Małgorzata Birbach (born 17 February 1960 in Brodnica, Kuyavian-Pomeranian) is a former female long-distance runner from Poland, who represented her native country at the 1992 Summer Olympics in Barcelona, Spain. She set her personal best (2:28:11) in the classic distance in 1992.

== Achievements ==
- All results regarding marathon, unless stated otherwise

Year	Competition	Venue	Position	Notes
Representing Poland
1991	Warsaw Marathon	Warsaw, Poland	1st	2:47:21
1992	Olympic Games	Barcelona, Spain	26th	2:54:33
