= Kazimierz Fiałka =

Polish long-distance runner

Personal information
- Nationality: Polish
- Born: 2 July 1907 Kraków, Poland
- Died: 25 September 1970 (aged 63) Kraków, Poland

Sport
- Sport: Long-distance running
- Event: Marathon

Kazimierz Fiałka (2 July 1907 – 25 September 1970) was a Polish long-distance runner. He competed in the marathon at the 1936 Summer Olympics.
