= Stanisław Ziffer =

Polish athlete (1904–c.1939/45)

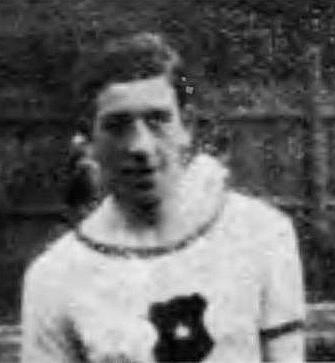
- Stanisław Ziffer in 1924

Personal information
- Nationality: Polish
- Born: 1 August 1904
- Died: between 1939 and 1945

Sport
- Sport: Long-distance running
- Event: 5000 metres

Stanisław Ziffer (born 1 August 1904, died between 1939 and 1945) was a Polish long-distance runner. He competed in the men's 5000 metres at the 1924 Summer Olympics. He was killed during World War II.
