= Julian Łukaszewicz =

Polish middle-distance runner

Personal information
- Nationality: Polish
- Born: 16 July 1904 Yekaterinoslav, Russian Empire
- Died: 3 August 1982 (aged 78) Łódź, Poland

Sport
- Sport: Athletics
- Event: Middle-distance running

Julian Łukaszewicz (16 July 1904 – 3 August 1982) was a Polish athlete. He competed in the men's 3000 metres team race event at the 1924 Summer Olympics.
