= Krystyna Nowakowska =

Polish athlete (1935–2019)

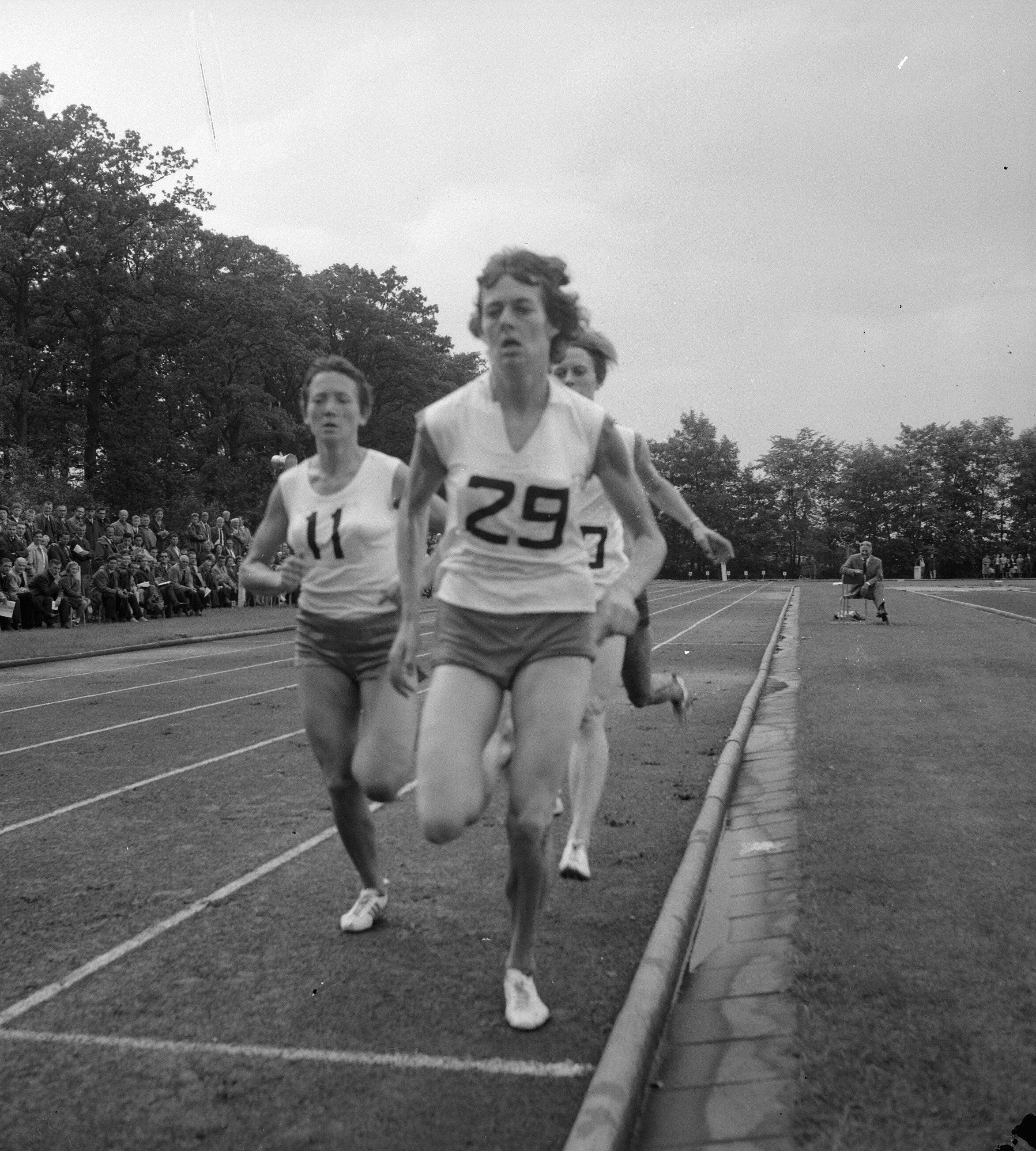
- Krystyna Nowakowska (left) along with Gerda Kraan of the Netherlands competing in the Netherlands in 1964

Personal information
- Born: 8 December 1935 Ostrowiec Świętokrzyski, Poland
- Died: 15 November 2019 (aged 83)
- Height: 1.67 m (5 ft 6 in)
- Weight: 54 kg (119 lb)

Sport
- Sport: Athletics
- Event: 800 metres
- Club: KSZO Stal Ostrowiec; Legia Warszawa

Krystyna Nowakowska (later Snop; Zawitkowska; 8 December 1935 – 15 November 2019) was a Polish female athlete. She represented Poland at the 1960 Summer Olympics in the 800 metres event. She also competed at the 1958 European Athletics Championships competing in 800 metres event and at the 1962 European Athletics Championships competing in the Women's 800 metres event.

== International competitions ==
Year	Competition	Venue	Position	Event	Notes
Representing Poland
1958	European Championships	Belgrade, Yugoslavia	9th (h)	800 m	2:10.7
1960	Olympic Games	Rome, Italy	9th (h)	800 m	2:09.81
1962	European Championships	Belgrade, Yugoslavia	5th	800 m	2:05.8

== Personal bests ==
- 400 metres – 57.6h (Wałcz 1961)
- 800 metres – 2:05.8h (Belgrade 1962) former NR

== See also ==
- Poland at the 1960 Summer Olympics
