= Tomasz Motyka (footballer) =

Polish footballer

Personal information
- Full name: Tomasz Motyka
- Date of birth: 31 January 1972 (age 54)
- Place of birth: Gdańsk, Poland
- Height: 1.79 m (5 ft 10 in)
- Position: Defender

Senior career*
| Years | Team | Apps | (Gls) |
| 1991–1997 | Lechia Gdańsk | 37 | (0) |
- * Club domestic league appearances and goals

Tomasz Motyka (born 31 December 1972) is a former footballer who played as a defender.

He started his career playing in the youth sides of Lechia Gdańsk alongside his brother Grzegorz Motyka. His Lechia debut came on 21 August 1991 in the Polish Cup against Polonia Chodzież, having to wait another two years for his next appearance for the club, this time coming in the II liga. In total Motyka spent seven seasons with the Lechia first team, but struggled to make an impact and stake a claim to a consistent starting position. He made 37 appearances for Lechia in the second and third divisions, and made a total of 41 appearances for Lechia in all competitions. In 1997 he stopped playing football to pursue other work, returning to Lechia in 2007 to coach in the Lechia academy eventually rising to becoming a "team leader" working with the Lechia Gdańsk II team. In 2017 he became managing director of Lechia Gdańsk, a position he held until 2020.
