= Grzegorz Motyka (footballer) =

Polish footballer (born 1972)

Personal information
- Full name: Grzegorz Motyka
- Date of birth: 31 January 1972 (age 54)
- Place of birth: Gdańsk, Poland
- Height: 1.84 m (6 ft 0 in)
- Positions: Defender; midfielder

Youth career
- –1991: Lechia Gdańsk

Senior career*
Years	Team	Apps	(Gls)
1991–1995	Lechia Gdańsk	75	(3)
1995–1996	Olimpia-Lechia Gdańsk	20	(1)
1996–1997	Hutnik Nowa Huta	29	(3)
1997–1999	Amica Wronki	43	(2)
1999	Dyskobolia Grodzisk Wlkp.	14	(2)
2000	Lechia-Polonia Gdańsk	21	(4)
2000–2001	KSZO Ostrowiec Świętokrzyski	2	(0)
2002	Aluminium Konin		
2002–2004	KP Sopot		
2005	Unia Tczew	9	(1)
2005	Przylesie Sopot		
2007	KP Sopot		
2008–2009	GKS Kowale		
Total		193	(14)
- * Club domestic league appearances and goals

Grzegorz Motyka (born 31 January 1972) is a Polish former professional footballer who played as a defender or midfielder. In a career which was mostly played in the top two divisions in Poland, he had spells with Hutnik Nowa Huta, Amica Wronki, and Dyskobolia Grodzisk Wielkopolski. His longest spell at a club was with Lechia Gdańsk, where also played in both of the Lechia Gdańsk merger teams Olimpia-Lechia Gdańsk and Lechia-Polonia Gdańsk.

== Football ==
=== Lechia Gdańsk ===
Motyka was born on 31 January 1972, in Gdańsk. He started playing football for local team Lechia Gdańsk alongside his brother Tomasz Motyka. He made his first team debut against Widzew Łódź towards the end of the 1990–91 season. At the start of his career Motyka played mainly as a defender for Lechia, before advancing slightly higher up the pitch to play as a defensive midfielder. During his time with Lechia the team played in the II liga, the second division in Poland. At the end of the 1994–95 season, Lechia were relegated to the third tier. In total for Lechia Gdańsk, Motyka played 80 games and scored 3 goals.

=== Olimpia-Lechia Gdańsk ===
With Lechia Gdańsk being relegated to the third division, a merger was formed with Olimpia Poznań to create the Olimpia-Lechia Gdańsk team, taking Olimpia's position in the top division. Motyka moved from the relegated Lechia team to the newly formed Olimpia-Lechia team. In total, Motyka played twenty times in his first top division season, scoring one goal as the Olimpia-Lechia suffered relegation. At the end of the season the team was dissolved, with Motyka finding himself without a club.

=== Hutnik Nowa Huta ===
Motyka moved to Kraków, joining Hutnik Nowa Huta in the top division. For Hutnik, he played 29 times during the 1996–97 season. Motyka suffered the same fate as 12 months prior, as Hutnik found themselves being relegated from the top-tier.

=== Amica Wronki ===
The next club Motyka joined was Amica Wronki. The two years he spent at Amica ended up being the most successful of his career. In his first season at the club, Amica won the Polish Cup. His second season was more successful, with Amica winning both the Polish Super Cup and the Polish Cup for the second time. In total, he played 43 league games for Amica over the two seasons.

=== Dyskobolia Grodzisk Wielkopolski ===
Motyka joined Dyskobolia in the summer of 1999 and had a short spell with the club, leaving in the next transfer window despite playing in most of Dyskobolia's games up to that point in the season.

=== Lechia-Polonia Gdańsk ===
In January 2000, Motyka moved back to Gdańsk, dropping down a division to play for Lechia-Polonia Gdańsk. He played most of the remaining games of the season for Lechia, helping the club avoid relegation.

=== Later years ===
Motyka joined fellow II liga team KSZO Ostrowiec Świętokrzyski in 2000, but managed to only play in 4 games in all competitions as the team won promotion to the top division. He spent two seasons with Aluminium Konin, helping the team to win promotion from the third tier to the second. In 2002, he moved back to the Pomeranian region of Poland, playing with KP Sopot, Unia Tczew, Przylesie Sopot and GKS Kowale, retiring from football in 2009.

== Honours ==
Amica Wronki

- Polish Cup: 1997–98, 1998–99
- Polish Super Cup: 1998
