= Zdzisław Motyka =

Polish cross-country skier

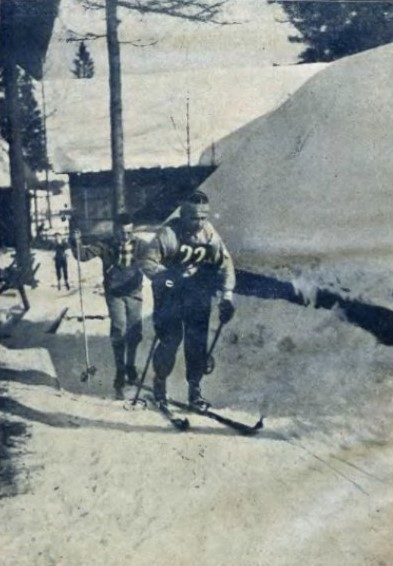
- Zdzisław Motyka in 1929

Personal information
- Nationality: Polish
- Born: 23 January 1907; Zakopane, Austria-Hungary
- Died: 21 March 1969 (aged 62); Kraków, Poland

Sport
- Sport: Cross-country skiing

Zdzisław Motyka (23 January 1907 – 21 March 1969) was a Polish cross-country skier. He competed at the 1928 Winter Olympics and the 1932 Winter Olympics. Motyka competed in the 18 kilometre event both times, finishing 23rd (with a time of 1:58:10) and 32nd (1:41:58). In 1932, he also competed in the 50&kilometre event, not finishing after a fall resulted in broken skis and bruises.

Motyka studied as a carpentry apprentice, graduating from a local wood industry school in 1923. The headmaster of that school promoted skiing to the students, which Motyka took up.

Motyka competed for the clubs SN PTT Zakopane (1922 to 1928), Strzelce (1929), Wisła (1930 to 1933), and Sokół (1934 to 1936). He won 7 Polish national championships in cross-country skiing: the 1930 and 1931 18 km, the 1927 and 1928 relay, and the 1929, 1930, and 1931 50&km. He competed in the FIS Nordic World Ski Championships 1930. He maintained preparation for the skiing season by competing in long-distance track and cross-country running during the summer, finishing in the top three at national championships in running as well.

He was awarded the Bronze Cross of Merit in 1931 "for merits in the field of sports development". Motyka worked as a coach, sporting goods store manager, announcer, judge, and sports official after competing. Stanisław Motyka, another Olympic skier, was his cousin.
