= List of Polish Athletics Championships winners =

The Polish Athletics Championships (Polish: Mistrzostwa Polski seniorów w lekkoatletyce) is an annual outdoor track and field competition organised by the Polish Athletic Association (PZLA), which serves as the Polish national championship for the sport. It is typically held as a three-day event in the Polish summer, ranging from late June to early August. The location of the championships varies each year. The first men's champions were announced in 1919, followed by the first women's champions in 1922. While the champions are usually Polish nationals, some foreign athletes have also won, particularly as invited guests, such as at the 1972 championships.

== Men ==
=== 100 metres ===
- 1960: Marian Foik
- 1961: Marian Foik
- 1962: Andrzej Zieliński
- 1963: Jerzy Juskowiak
- 1964: Marian Foik
- 1965: Wiesław Maniak
- 1966: Wiesław Maniak
- 1967: Wiesław Maniak
- 1968: Marian Dudziak
- 1969: Zenon Nowosz
- 1970: Zenon Nowosz
- 1971: Wiesław Maniak
- 1972: Hermes Ramírez (CUB)
- 1973: Zenon Nowosz
- 1974: Andrzej Świerczyński
- 1975: Andrzej Świerczyński
- 1976: Zenon Licznerski
- 1977: Zenon Licznerski
- 1978: Marian Woronin
- 1979: Marian Woronin
- 1980: Marian Woronin
- 1981: Marian Woronin
- 1982: Marian Woronin
- 1983: Marian Woronin
- 1984: Leszek Dunecki
- 1985: Marian Woronin
- 1986: Czesław Prądzyński
- 1987: Czesław Prądzyński
- 1988: Marian Woronin
- 1989: Jacek Marlicki
- 1990: Jacek Marlicki
- 1991: Jarosław Kaniecki
- 1992: Marek Zalewski
- 1993: Marek Zalewski
- 1994: Marek Zalewski
- 1995: Marek Zalewski
- 1996: Ryszard Pilarczyk
- 1997: Ryszard Pilarczyk
- 1998: Marcin Krzywański
- 1999: Piotr Balcerzak
- 2000: Marcin Nowak
- 2001: Marcin Krzywański
- 2002: Marcin Urbaś
- 2003: Marcin Jędrusiński
- 2004: Łukasz Chyła
- 2005: Michał Bielczyk
- 2006: Dariusz Kuć

=== 200 metres ===
- 1960: Jan Jarzembowski
- 1961: Marian Foik
- 1962: Andrzej Zieliński
- 1963: Marian Foik
- 1964: Marian Foik
- 1965: Wiesław Maniak
- 1966: Marian Dudziak
- 1967: Jan Werner
- 1968: Edward Romanowski
- 1969: Jan Werner
- 1970: Zenon Nowosz
- 1971: Jan Werner
- 1972: Jerzy Czerbniak
- 1973: Marek Bedyński
- 1974: Marek Bedyński
- 1975: Bogdan Grzejszczak
- 1976: Zenon Licznerski
- 1977: Zenon Licznerski
- 1978: Leszek Dunecki
- 1979: Leszek Dunecki
- 1980: Leszek Dunecki
- 1981: Leszek Dunecki
- 1982: Czesław Prądzyński
- 1983: Marian Woronin
- 1984: Leszek Dunecki
- 1985: Czesław Prądzyński
- 1986: Czesław Prądzyński
- 1987: Czesław Prądzyński
- 1988: Czesław Prądzyński
- 1989: Marek Zalewski
- 1990: Marek Zalewski
- 1991: Jarosław Kaniecki
- 1992: Marek Zalewski
- 1993: Marek Zalewski
- 1994: Marek Zalewski
- 1995: Robert Maćkowiak
- 1996: Robert Maćkowiak
- 1997: Robert Maćkowiak
- 1998: Marcin Urbaś
- 1999: Marcin Urbaś
- 2000: Marcin Urbaś
- 2001: Marcin Urbaś
- 2002: Marcin Jędrusiński
- 2003: Marcin Jędrusiński
- 2004: Marcin Urbaś
- 2005: Marcin Jędrusiński
- 2006: Marcin Jędrusiński

=== 400 metres ===
- 1960: Jerzy Kowalski
- 1961: Jerzy Kowalski
- 1962: Andrzej Badeński
- 1963: Andrzej Badeński
- 1964: Andrzej Badeński
- 1965: Andrzej Badeński
- 1966: Stanisław Grędziński
- 1967: Andrzej Badeński
- 1968: Jan Werner
- 1969: Stanisław Grędziński
- 1970: Jan Werner
- 1971: Jan Werner
- 1972: Zbigniew Jaremski
- 1973: Zbigniew Jaremski
- 1974: Roman Siedlecki
- 1975: Zbigniew Jaremski
- 1976: Jan Werner
- 1977: Ryszard Podlas
- 1978: Ryszard Podlas
- 1979: Ryszard Podlas
- 1980: Adam Starostka
- 1981: Andrzej Stępień
- 1982: Andrzej Stępień
- 1983: Andrzej Stępień
- 1984: Andrzej Stępień
- 1985: Andrzej Stępień
- 1986: Andrzej Stępień
- 1987: Marek Sira
- 1988: Tomasz Jędrusik
- 1989: Wojciech Lach
- 1990: Tomasz Jędrusik
- 1991: Wojciech Lach
- 1992: Tomasz Czubak
- 1993: Tomasz Czubak
- 1994: Tomasz Czubak
- 1995: Tomasz Jędrusik
- 1996: Piotr Rysiukiewicz
- 1997: Tomasz Czubak
- 1998: Robert Maćkowiak
- 1999: Piotr Rysiukiewicz
- 2000: Robert Maćkowiak
- 2001: Robert Maćkowiak
- 2002: Piotr Rysiukiewicz
- 2003: Rafał Wieruszewski
- 2004: Marcin Marciniszyn
- 2005: Marcin Marciniszyn
- 2006: Marcin Marciniszyn

=== 800 metres ===
- 1960: Jerzy Bruszkowski
- 1961: Witold Baran
- 1962: Jerzy Bruszkowski
- 1963: Henryk Maciąg
- 1964: Jerzy Bruszkowski
- 1965: Janusz Grzeszczuk
- 1966: Henryk Szordykowski
- 1967: Henryk Szordykowski
- 1968: Jerzy Sawicki
- 1969: Henryk Szordykowski
- 1970: Stanisław Waśkiewicz
- 1971: Andrzej Kupczyk
- 1972: Stanisław Waśkiewicz
- 1973: Andrzej Kupczyk
- 1974: Ryszard Świniarski
- 1975: Waldemar Gondek
- 1976: Marian Gęsicki
- 1977: Marian Gęsicki
- 1978: Marian Gęsicki
- 1979: Stanisław Rzeźniczak
- 1980: Marian Gęsicki
- 1981: Bogdan Stroka
- 1982: Ryszard Ostrowski
- 1983: Ryszard Ostrowski
- 1984: Ryszard Ostrowski
- 1985: Piotr Piekarski
- 1986: Rafał Jerzy
- 1987: Ryszard Ostrowski
- 1988: Piotr Piekarski
- 1989: Piotr Piekarski
- 1990: Piotr Piekarski
- 1991: Piotr Piekarski
- 1992: Andrzej Jakubiec
- 1993: Piotr Piekarski
- 1994: Piotr Piekarski
- 1995: Piotr Piekarski
- 1996: Wojciech Kałdowski
- 1997: Grzegorz Krzosek
- 1998: Paweł Czapiewski
- 1999: Wojciech Kałdowski
- 2000: Grzegorz Krzosek
- 2001: Paweł Czapiewski
- 2002: Grzegorz Krzosek
- 2003: Mirosław Formela
- 2004: Mirosław Formela
- 2005: Paweł Czapiewski
- 2006: Grzegorz Krzosek

=== 1500 metres ===
- 1960: Zbigniew Orywał
- 1961: Zbigniew Orywał
- 1962: Witold Baran
- 1963: Witold Baran
- 1964: Witold Baran
- 1965: Bolesław Kowalczyk
- 1966: Witold Baran
- 1967: Witold Baran
- 1968: Henryk Szordykowski
- 1969: Jerzy Maluśki
- 1970: Andrzej Kupczyk
- 1971: Henryk Szordykowski
- 1972: Henryk Szordykowski
- 1973: Lesław Zając
- 1974: Henryk Szordykowski
- 1975: Henryk Wasilewski
- 1976: Henryk Wasilewski
- 1977: Henryk Wasilewski
- 1978: Henryk Wasilewski
- 1979: Jerzy Kalicki
- 1980: Włodzimierz Matosz
- 1981: Mirosław Żerkowski
- 1982: Mirosław Żerkowski
- 1983: Mirosław Żerkowski
- 1984: Mirosław Żerkowski
- 1985: Mirosław Żerkowski
- 1986: Waldemar Lisicki
- 1987: Piotr Kurek
- 1988: Waldemar Lisicki
- 1989: Waldemar Lisicki
- 1990: Krzysztof Filusz
- 1991: Waldemar Glinka
- 1992: Karol Dudij
- 1993: Andrzej Jakubiec
- 1994: Piotr Kitliński
- 1995: Piotr Rostkowski
- 1996: Jakub Fijalkowski
- 1997: Piotr Rostkowski
- 1998: Jakub Fijalkowski
- 1999: Leszek Zblewski
- 2000: Leszek Zblewski
- 2001: Leszek Zblewski
- 2002: Paweł Czapiewski
- 2003: Zbigniew Graczyk
- 2004: Zbigniew Graczyk
- 2005: Mirosław Formela
- 2006: Mirosław Formela

=== 5000 metres ===
- 1960: Kazimierz Zimny
- 1961: Lech Boguszewicz
- 1962: Jerzy Mathias
- 1963: Lech Boguszewicz
- 1964: Lech Boguszewicz
- 1965: Kazimierz Zimny
- 1966: Kazimierz Zimny
- 1967: Roland Brehmer
- 1968: Witold Baran
- 1969: Kazimierz Podolak
- 1970: Kazimierz Podolak
- 1971: Edward Łęgowski
- 1972: Bronisław Malinowski
- 1973: Bronisław Malinowski
- 1974: Willy Polleunis (BEL)
- 1975: Bronisław Malinowski
- 1976: Jerzy Kowol
- 1977: Jerzy Kowol
- 1978: Jerzy Kowol
- 1979: Jerzy Kowol
- 1980: Ryszard Kopijasz
- 1981: Bogusław Psujek
- 1982: Bogusław Psujek
- 1983: Bogusław Mamiński
- 1984: Antoni Niemczak
- 1985: Wojciech Jaworski & Bogusław Psujek
- 1986: Bogusław Psujek
- 1987: Bogusław Mamiński
- 1988: Czesław Mojżysz
- 1989: Leszek Bebło
- 1990: Henryk Jankowski
- 1991: Michał Bartoszak
- 1992: Michał Bartoszak
- 1993: Michał Bartoszak
- 1994: Sławomir Kąpiński
- 1995: Jan Bialk
- 1996: Waldemar Glinka
- 1997: Michał Bartoszak
- 1998: Piotr Gładki
- 1999: Piotr Gładki
- 2000: Piotr Drwal
- 2001: Leszek Biegała
- 2002: Dariusz Kruczkowski
- 2003: Radosław Popławski
- 2004: Michał Kaczmarek
- 2005: Radosław Popławski
- 2006: Michał Kaczmarek

=== 10,000 metres ===
- 1960: Zdzisław Krzyszkowiak
- 1961: Stanisław Ożóg
- 1962: Stanisław Ożóg
- 1963: Edward Owczarek
- 1964: Kazimierz Podolak
- 1965: Edward Owczarek
- 1966: Edward Stawiarz
- 1967: Mieczysław Korzec
- 1968: Edward Stawiarz
- 1969: Edward Stawiarz
- 1970: Edward Mleczko
- 1971: Edward Mleczko
- 1972: Kazimierz Podolak
- 1973: Henryk Piotrowski
- 1974: Henryk Nogala
- 1975: Edward Mleczko
- 1976: Ryszard Kopijasz
- 1977: Ryszard Kopijasz
- 1978: Andrzej Jarosiewicz
- 1979: Jerzy Kowol
- 1980: Ryszard Kopijasz
- 1981: Bogumil Kus
- 1982: Bogumil Kus
- 1983: Bogumil Kus
- 1984: Antoni Niemczak
- 1985: Antoni Niemczak
- 1986: Bogusław Psujek
- 1987: Jan Huruk
- 1988: Jan Marchewka
- 1989: Leszek Bebło
- 1990: Sławomir Majusiak
- 1991: Leszek Bebło
- 1992: Grzegorz Gajdus
- 1993: Zbigniew Nadolski
- 1994: Grzegorz Gajdus
- 1995: Jan Bialk
- 1996: Waldemar Glinka
- 1997: Jan Bialk
- 1998: Krzysztof Bałdyga
- 1999: Jan Bialk
- 2000: Jan Bialk
- 2001: Dariusz Kruczkowski
- 2002: Dariusz Kruczkowski
- 2003: Dariusz Kruczkowski
- 2004: Jan Zakrzewski
- 2005: Arkadiusz Sowa
- 2006: Michał Kaczmarek

=== 20K run ===
- 1975: Zbigniew Sawicki
- 1976: Zbigniew Sawicki
- 1977: Andrzej Jarosiewicz
- 1978: Zbigniew Pierzynka
- 1979: Not held
- 1980: Andrzej Jarosiewicz
- 1981: Ryszard Kopijasz
- 1982: Antoni Niemczak
- 1983: Paweł Lorens
- 1984: Paweł Lorens
- 1985: Paweł Lorens
- 1986: Wiktor Sawicki
- 1987: Mirosław Gołębiewski
- 1988: Mirosław Gołębiewski
- 1989: Wiesław Perszke
- 1990: Leszek Bebło
- 1991: Grzegorz Gajdus

=== 25K run ===
- 1979: Zbigniew Pierzynka

=== Marathon ===
The course for the 1992 marathon race was short, but the winner remained valid.

- 1960: Euzebiusz Fert
- 1961: Albin Czech
- 1962: Jerzy Morawiec
- 1963: Jacek Nowakowski
- 1964: Marian Jurczyński
- 1965: Marian Jurczyński
- 1966: Zdzisław Bogusz
- 1967: Edmund Klecha
- 1968: Zdzisław Bogusz
- 1969: Zdzisław Bogusz
- 1970: Zdzisław Bogusz
- 1971: Edward Stawiarz
- 1972: Edward Stawiarz
- 1973: Edward Stawiarz
- 1974: Edward Łęgowski
- 1975: Edward Łęgowski
- 1976: Kazimierz Orzeł
- 1977: Kazimierz Orzeł
- 1978: Ryszard Marczak
- 1979: Zbigniew Pierzynka
- 1980: Zbigniew Pierzynka
- 1981: Ryszard Marczak
- 1982: Ryszard Kopijasz
- 1983: Jerzy Kowol
- 1984: Wojciech Ratkowski
- 1985: Ryszard Misiewicz
- 1986: Antoni Niemczak
- 1987: Bogumil Kus
- 1988: Wiktor Sawicki
- 1989: Marek Deputat
- 1990: Józef Kazanecki
- 1991: Tadeusz Ławicki
- 1992: Tadeusz Ławicki
- 1993: Tadeusz Ławicki
- 1994: Janusz Wójcik
- 1995: Wiesław Palczyński
- 1996: Mirosław Plawgo
- 1997: Adam Szanowicz
- 1998: Wiesław Perszke
- 1999: Piotr Poblocki
- 2000: Mirosław Plawgo
- 2001: Mirosław Plawgo
- 2002: Jan Bialk
- 2003: Waldemar Glinka
- 2004: Waldemar Glinka
- 2005: Rafał Wójcik

=== 3000 metres steeplechase ===
- 1960: Jerzy Chromik
- 1961: Jerzy Chromik
- 1962: Jerzy Chromik
- 1963: Edward Szklarczyk
- 1964: Edward Szklarczyk
- 1965: Edward Szklarczyk
- 1966: Edward Szklarczyk
- 1967: Wolfgang Luers
- 1968: Stanisław Śmitkowski
- 1969: Kazimierz Maranda
- 1970: Tadeusz Zieliński
- 1971: Kazimierz Maranda
- 1972: Stanisław Śmitkowski
- 1973: Bronisław Malinowski
- 1974: Bronisław Malinowski
- 1975: Henryk Lesiuk
- 1976: Kazimierz Maranda
- 1977: Kazimierz Maranda
- 1978: Bronisław Malinowski
- 1979: Bogusław Mamiński
- 1980: Bronisław Malinowski
- 1981: Krzysztof Wesołowski
- 1982: Piotr Zgarda
- 1983: Krzysztof Wesołowski
- 1984: Henryk Jankowski
- 1985: Bogusław Mamiński
- 1986: Henryk Jankowski
- 1987: Mirosław Żerkowski
- 1988: Mirosław Żerkowski
- 1989: Henryk Jankowski
- 1990: Tomasz Zimny
- 1991: Artur Osman
- 1992: Bogusław Mamiński
- 1993: Bogusław Mamiński
- 1994: Rafał Wójcik
- 1995: Rafał Wójcik
- 1996: Michał Bartoszak
- 1997: Rafał Wójcik
- 1998: Rafał Wójcik
- 1999: Jan Zakrzewski
- 2000: Rafał Wójcik
- 2001: Jan Zakrzewski
- 2002: Rafał Wójcik
- 2003: Rafał Wójcik
- 2004: Jan Zakrzewski
- 2005: Jakub Czaja
- 2006: Tomasz Szymkowiak

=== 110 metres hurdles ===
- 1960: Roman Muzyk
- 1961: Roman Muzyk
- 1962: Edward Bugala
- 1963: Edward Bugala
- 1964: Edward Bugala
- 1965: Adam Kołodziejczyk
- 1966: Adam Kołodziejczyk
- 1967: Adam Kołodziejczyk
- 1968: Adam Kołodziejczyk
- 1969: Marek Jóźwik
- 1970: Marek Jóźwik
- 1971: Marek Jóźwik
- 1972: Leszek Wodzyński
- 1973: Leszek Wodzyński
- 1974: Mirosław Wodzyński
- 1975: Leszek Wodzyński
- 1976: Leszek Wodzyński
- 1977: Jan Pusty
- 1978: Romuald Giegiel
- 1979: Jan Pusty
- 1980: Jan Pusty
- 1981: Romuald Giegiel
- 1982: Romuald Giegiel
- 1983: Romuald Giegiel
- 1984: Romuald Giegiel
- 1985: Romuald Giegiel
- 1986: Romuald Giegiel
- 1987: Krzysztof Płatek
- 1988: Krzysztof Płatek
- 1989: Paweł Grzegorzewski
- 1990: Tomasz Nagórka
- 1991: Piotr Wójcik
- 1992: Piotr Wójcik
- 1993: Piotr Wójcik
- 1994: Ronald Mehlich
- 1995: Ronald Mehlich
- 1996: Krzysztof Mehlich
- 1997: Ronald Mehlich
- 1998: Tomasz Ścigaczewski
- 1999: Tomasz Ścigaczewski
- 2000: Marcin Kuśzewski
- 2001: Artur Kohutek
- 2002: Artur Kohutek
- 2003: Artur Kohutek
- 2004: Tomasz Ścigaczewski
- 2005: Tomasz Ścigaczewski
- 2006: Artur Kohutek

=== 200 metres hurdles ===
- 1960: Zdzisław Kumiszcze
- 1961: Zdzisław Kumiszcze
- 1962: Edward Bugala
- 1963: Bogusław Gierajewski

=== 400 metres hurdles ===
- 1960: Wiesław Król
- 1961: Zdzisław Kumiszcze
- 1962: Andrzej Makowski
- 1963: Bogusław Gierajewski
- 1964: Bogusław Gierajewski
- 1965: Andrzej Skorupiński
- 1966: Stanisław Gubiec
- 1967: Stanisław Gubiec
- 1968: Wilhelm Weistand
- 1969: Tadeusz Kulczycki
- 1970: Zdzisław Serafin
- 1971: Tadeusz Kulczycki
- 1972: Yuriy Zorin (URS)
- 1973: Jerzy Hewelt
- 1974: Jerzy Hewelt
- 1975: Jerzy Hewelt
- 1976: Jerzy Hewelt
- 1977: Jerzy Hewelt
- 1978: Krzysztof Węglarski
- 1979: Leszek Rzepakowski
- 1980: Ryszard Szparak
- 1981: Ryszard Szparak
- 1982: Ryszard Szparak
- 1983: Ryszard Szparak
- 1984: Ryszard Szparak
- 1985: Ryszard Stoch
- 1986: Ryszard Stoch
- 1987: Ryszard Stoch
- 1988: Robert Zajkowski
- 1989: Ryszard Stoch
- 1990: Paweł Woźniak
- 1991: Paweł Woźniak
- 1992: Paweł Woźniak
- 1993: Piotr Kotlarski
- 1994: Piotr Kotlarski
- 1995: Paweł Januszewski
- 1996: Paweł Januszewski
- 1997: Paweł Januszewski
- 1998: Bartosz Gruman
- 1999: Paweł Januszewski
- 2000: Paweł Januszewski
- 2001: Marek Plawgo
- 2002: Paweł Januszewski
- 2003: Marek Plawgo
- 2004: Paweł Januszewski
- 2005: Marek Plawgo
- 2006: Marek Plawgo

=== High jump ===
- 1960: Piotr Sobotta
- 1961: Edward Czernik
- 1962: Piotr Sobotta
- 1963: Edward Czernik
- 1964: Edward Czernik
- 1965: Piotr Kaczmarek
- 1966: Edward Czernik
- 1967: Edward Czernik
- 1968: Janusz Białogrodzki
- 1969: Wojciech Gołębiewski
- 1970: Lech Klinger
- 1971: Wojciech Gołębiewski
- 1972: Lawrie Peckham (AUS)
- 1973: Włodzimierz Perka
- 1974: Jacek Wszoła
- 1975: Jacek Wszoła
- 1976: Jacek Wszoła
- 1977: Jacek Wszoła
- 1978: Jacek Wszoła
- 1979: Jacek Wszoła
- 1980: Jacek Wszoła
- 1981: Janusz Trzepizur
- 1982: Jacek Wszoła
- 1983: Janusz Trzepizur
- 1984: Jacek Wszoła
- 1985: Jacek Wszoła
- 1986: Dariusz Zielke
- 1987: Krzysztof Krawczyk
- 1988: Jacek Wszoła
- 1989: Artur Partyka
- 1990: Artur Partyka
- 1991: Artur Partyka
- 1992: Artur Partyka
- 1993: Artur Partyka
- 1994: Artur Partyka
- 1995: Artur Partyka
- 1996: Artur Partyka
- 1997: Artur Partyka
- 1998: Artur Partyka
- 1999: Artur Partyka
- 2000: Artur Partyka
- 2001: Grzegorz Sposób
- 2002: Grzegorz Sposób
- 2003: Aleksander Waleriańczyk
- 2004: Robert Wolski
- 2005: Michał Bieniek
- 2006: Grzegorz Sposób

=== Pole vault ===
- 1960: Janusz Gronowski
- 1961: Janusz Gronowski
- 1962: Janusz Gronowski
- 1963: Włodzimierz Sokołowski
- 1964: Włodzimierz Sokołowski
- 1965: Włodzimierz Sokołowski
- 1966: Włodzimierz Sokołowski
- 1967: Waldemar Węcek
- 1968: Leszek Butscher
- 1969: Sławomir Nowak
- 1970: Wojciech Buciarski
- 1971: Włodzimierz Sokołowski
- 1972: Tadeusz Ślusarski
- 1973: Władysław Kozakiewicz
- 1974: Tadeusz Ślusarski
- 1975: Tadeusz Ślusarski
- 1976: Władysław Kozakiewicz
- 1977: Władysław Kozakiewicz
- 1978: Władysław Kozakiewicz
- 1979: Władysław Kozakiewicz
- 1980: Zbigniew Matyka
- 1981: Władysław Kozakiewicz
- 1982: Tadeusz Ślusarski
- 1983: Tadeusz Ślusarski
- 1984: Władysław Kozakiewicz
- 1985: Marian Kolasa
- 1986: Mariusz Klimczyk
- 1987: Marian Kolasa
- 1988: Ryszard Kolasa
- 1989: Ryszard Kolasa
- 1990: Mirosław Chmara
- 1991: Mirosław Chmara
- 1992: Mirosław Chmara
- 1993: Bogusław Kopkowski
- 1994: Krzysztof Kusiak
- 1995: Adam Kolasa
- 1996: Adam Kolasa
- 1997: Krzysztof Kusiak
- 1998: Krzysztof Kusiak
- 1999: Przemysław Gurin
- 2000: Krzysztof Kusiak
- 2001: Adam Kolasa
- 2002: Paweł Szczyrba
- 2003: Adam Kolasa
- 2004: Adam Kolasa
- 2005: Adam Kolasa
- 2006: Przemysław Czerwiński

=== Long jump ===
- 1960: Edward Ludwiczak
- 1961: Józef Szmidt
- 1962: Waldemar Gawron
- 1963: Andrzej Stalmach
- 1964: Andrzej Stalmach
- 1965: Jerzy Chlopek
- 1966: Andrzej Stalmach
- 1967: Andrzej Stalmach
- 1968: Andrzej Stalmach
- 1969: Waldemar Stępień
- 1970: Stanisław Cabaj
- 1971: Stanisław Szudrowicz
- 1972: Jerzy Homziuk
- 1973: Zbigniew Beta
- 1974: Stanisław Szudrowicz
- 1975: Grzegorz Cybulski
- 1976: Grzegorz Cybulski
- 1977: Andrzej Korniak
- 1978: Grzegorz Cybulski
- 1979: Grzegorz Cybulski
- 1980: Stanisław Jaskułka
- 1981: Stanisław Jaskułka
- 1982: Stanisław Jaskułka
- 1983: Włodzimierz Włodarczyk
- 1984: Stanisław Jaskułka
- 1985: Andrzej Klimaszewski
- 1986: Stanisław Jaskułka
- 1987: Andrzej Klimaszewski
- 1988: Mirosław Hydel
- 1989: Mirosław Hydel
- 1990: Dariusz Krakowiak
- 1991: Mirosław Nowaczyk
- 1992: Roman Golanowski
- 1993: Roman Golanowski
- 1994: Roman Golanowski
- 1995: Dariusz Bontruk
- 1996: Krzysztof Łuczak
- 1997: Krzysztof Łuczak
- 1998: Grzegorz Marciniszyn
- 1999: Tomasz Mateusiak
- 2000: Grzegorz Marciniszyn
- 2001: Grzegorz Marciniszyn
- 2002: Tomasz Mateusiak
- 2003: Tomasz Mateusiak
- 2004: Michał Łukasiak
- 2005: Tomasz Mateusiak
- 2006: Marcin Starzak

=== Triple jump ===
- 1960: Józef Szmidt
- 1961: Ryszard Malcherczyk
- 1962: Józef Szmidt
- 1963: Józef Szmidt
- 1964: Ryszard Malcherczyk
- 1965: Józef Szmidt
- 1966: Józef Szmidt
- 1967: Józef Szmidt
- 1968: Andrzej Puławski
- 1969: Józef Szmidt
- 1970: Józef Szmidt
- 1971: Józef Szmidt
- 1972: Michał Joachimowski
- 1973: Michał Joachimowski
- 1974: Michał Joachimowski
- 1975: Michał Joachimowski
- 1976: Michał Joachimowski
- 1977: Eugeniusz Biskupski
- 1978: Michał Joachimowski
- 1979: Eugeniusz Biskupski
- 1980: Zdzisław Sobora
- 1981: Zdzisław Hoffmann
- 1982: Stanisław Oporski
- 1983: Zdzisław Hoffmann
- 1984: Zdzisław Hoffmann
- 1985: Jacek Pastusiński
- 1986: Jacek Pastusiński
- 1987: Jacek Pastusiński
- 1988: Andrzej Grabarczyk
- 1989: Zdzisław Hoffmann
- 1990: Andrzej Grabarczyk
- 1991: Andrzej Grabarczyk
- 1992: Eugeniusz Bedeniczuk
- 1993: Jacek Butkiewicz
- 1994: Piotr Weremczuk
- 1995: Paweł Zdrajkowski
- 1996: Krystian Ciemala
- 1997: Krystian Ciemala
- 1998: Paweł Zdrajkowski
- 1999: Krzysztof Szuptarski
- 2000: Jacek Kazimierowski
- 2001: Jacek Kazimierowski
- 2002: Jacek Kazimierowski
- 2003: Robert Michniewski
- 2004: Jacek Kazimierowski
- 2005: Jacek Kazimierowski
- 2006: Jacek Kazimierowski

=== Shot put ===
- 1960: Alfred Sosgórnik
- 1961: Alfred Sosgórnik
- 1962: Alfred Sosgórnik
- 1963: Władysław Komar
- 1964: Władysław Komar
- 1965: Alfred Sosgórnik
- 1966: Władysław Komar
- 1967: Władysław Komar
- 1968: Władysław Komar
- 1969: Władysław Komar
- 1970: Władysław Komar
- 1971: Władysław Komar
- 1972: Władysław Komar
- 1973: Władysław Komar
- 1974: Mieczysław Bręczewski
- 1975: Władysław Komar
- 1976: Władysław Komar
- 1977: Władysław Komar
- 1978: Władysław Komar
- 1979: Edward Sarul
- 1980: Edward Sarul
- 1981: Janusz Gassowski
- 1982: Edward Sarul
- 1983: Edward Sarul
- 1984: Janusz Gassowski
- 1985: Janusz Gassowski
- 1986: Helmut Krieger
- 1987: Helmut Krieger
- 1988: Helmut Krieger
- 1989: Helmut Krieger
- 1990: Helmut Krieger
- 1991: Helmut Krieger
- 1992: Helmut Krieger
- 1993: Helmut Krieger
- 1994: Helmut Krieger
- 1995: Helmut Krieger
- 1996: Piotr Perżyło
- 1997: Przemysław Zabawski
- 1998: Piotr Perżyło
- 1999: Mirosław Dec
- 2000: Przemysław Zabawski
- 2001: Leszek Śliwa
- 2002: Tomasz Majewski
- 2003: Tomasz Majewski
- 2004: Tomasz Majewski
- 2005: Tomasz Majewski
- 2006: Dominik Zieliński

=== Discus throw ===
- 1960: Edmund Piątkowski
- 1961: Edmund Piątkowski
- 1962: Edmund Piątkowski
- 1963: Edmund Piątkowski
- 1964: Edmund Piątkowski
- 1965: Edmund Piątkowski
- 1966: Edmund Piątkowski
- 1967: Zenon Begier
- 1968: Edmund Piątkowski
- 1969: Edmund Piątkowski
- 1970: Zenon Begier
- 1971: Lech Gajdziński
- 1972: János Murányi (HUN)
- 1973: Lech Gajdziński
- 1974: Lech Gajdziński
- 1975: Stanisław Wołodko
- 1976: Stanisław Wołodko
- 1977: Olgierd Kurawicz
- 1978: Dariusz Juzyszyn
- 1979: Andrzej Bejrowski
- 1980: Stanisław Wołodko
- 1981: Stanisław Wołodko
- 1982: Dariusz Juzyszyn
- 1983: Dariusz Juzyszyn
- 1984: Stanisław Grabowski
- 1985: Dariusz Juzyszyn
- 1986: Dariusz Juzyszyn
- 1987: Dariusz Juzyszyn
- 1988: Dariusz Juzyszyn
- 1989: Dariusz Juzyszyn
- 1990: Jacek Strychalski
- 1991: Jacek Strychalski
- 1992: Marek Majkrzak
- 1993: Marek Stolarczyk
- 1994: Marek Majkrzak
- 1995: Dariusz Juzyszyn
- 1996: Andrzej Krawczyk
- 1997: Andrzej Krawczyk
- 1998: Andrzej Krawczyk
- 1999: Olgierd Stański
- 2000: Olgierd Stański
- 2001: Olgierd Stański
- 2002: Andrzej Krawczyk
- 2003: Andrzej Krawczyk
- 2004: Andrzej Krawczyk
- 2005: Piotr Małachowski
- 2006: Piotr Małachowski

=== Hammer throw ===
- 1960: Olgierd Ciepły
- 1961: Tadeusz Rut
- 1962: Olgierd Ciepły
- 1963: Olgierd Ciepły
- 1964: Tadeusz Rut
- 1965: Tadeusz Rut
- 1966: Tadeusz Rut
- 1967: Zdzisław Smoliński
- 1968: Zbigniew Pałyszko
- 1969: Stanisław Lubiejewski
- 1970: Piotr Gaździk
- 1971: Zbigniew Pałyszko
- 1972: Stanisław Lubiejewski
- 1973: Stanisław Lubiejewski
- 1974: Szymon Jagliński
- 1975: Szymon Jagliński
- 1976: Szymon Jagliński
- 1977: Stanisław Lubiejewski
- 1978: Ireneusz Golda
- 1979: Ireneusz Golda
- 1980: Leszek Woderski
- 1981: Mariusz Tomaszewski
- 1982: Ireneusz Golda
- 1983: Zdzisław Kwaśny
- 1984: Mariusz Tomaszewski
- 1985: Mariusz Tomaszewski
- 1986: Wacław Filek
- 1987: Mariusz Tomaszewski
- 1988: Mariusz Tomaszewski
- 1989: Mikhail Popel (URS)
- 1990: Stanisław Kapusta
- 1991: Mikhail Popel (URS)
- 1992: Lech Kowalski
- 1993: Lech Kowalski
- 1994: Lech Kowalski
- 1995: Lech Kowalski
- 1996: Szymon Ziółkowski
- 1997: Szymon Ziółkowski
- 1998: Maciej Pałyszko
- 1999: Szymon Ziółkowski
- 2000: Szymon Ziółkowski
- 2001: Szymon Ziółkowski
- 2002: Szymon Ziółkowski
- 2003: Wojciech Kondratowicz
- 2004: Szymon Ziółkowski
- 2005: Szymon Ziółkowski
- 2006: Szymon Ziółkowski

=== Javelin throw ===
- 1960: Janusz Sidło
- 1961: Janusz Sidło
- 1962: Władysław Nikiciuk
- 1963: Janusz Sidło
- 1964: Władysław Nikiciuk
- 1965: Józef Glogowski
- 1966: Janusz Sidło
- 1967: Władysław Nikiciuk
- 1968: Władysław Nikiciuk
- 1969: Janusz Sidło
- 1970: Władysław Nikiciuk
- 1971: Władysław Nikiciuk
- 1972: Wiesław Sierański
- 1973: Władysław Nikiciuk
- 1974: Bernard Werner
- 1975: Piotr Bielczyk
- 1976: Piotr Bielczyk
- 1977: Piotr Bielczyk
- 1978: Roman Zwierzchowski
- 1979: Piotr Bielczyk
- 1980: Dariusz Adamus
- 1981: Michał Wacławik
- 1982: Michał Wacławik
- 1983: Dariusz Adamus
- 1984: Stanisław Witek
- 1985: Mirosław Szybowski
- 1986: Stanisław Górak
- 1987: Mirosław Witek
- 1988: Mirosław Witek
- 1989: Stanisław Witek
- 1990: Stanisław Witek
- 1991: Czesław Uhl
- 1992: Rajmund Kólko
- 1993: Tomasz Damszel
- 1994: Mirosław Witek
- 1995: Rajmund Kólko
- 1996: Dariusz Trafas
- 1997: Rajmund Kólko
- 1998: Dariusz Trafas
- 1999: Dariusz Trafas
- 2000: Grzegorz Krasiński
- 2001: Dariusz Trafas
- 2002: Dariusz Trafas
- 2003: Dariusz Trafas
- 2004: Rajmund Kólko
- 2005: Dariusz Trafas
- 2006: Dariusz Trafas

=== Decathlon ===
- 1960: Andrzej Mankiewicz
- 1961: Andrzej Mankiewicz
- 1962: Andrzej Mankiewicz
- 1963: Jerzy Detko
- 1964: Tadeusz Grzegorzewski
- 1965: Jerzy Detko
- 1966: Jerzy Detko
- 1967: Tadeusz Grzegorzewski
- 1968: Jerzy Detko
- 1969: Tadeusz Janczenko
- 1970: Tadeusz Janczenko
- 1971: Tadeusz Janczenko
- 1972: Tadeusz Janczenko
- 1973: Ryszard Skowronek
- 1974: Ryszard Katus
- 1975: Ryszard Katus
- 1976: Ryszard Skowronek
- 1977: Ryszard Skowronek
- 1978: Ryszard Katus
- 1979: Dariusz Ludwig
- 1980: Janusz Szczerkowski
- 1981: Marek Kubiszewski
- 1982: Wojciech Podsiadło
- 1983: Maciej Jedral
- 1984: Wojciech Podsiadło
- 1985: Marek Kubiszewski
- 1986: Janusz Leśniewicz
- 1987: Wojciech Podsiadło
- 1988: Dariusz Grad
- 1989: Dariusz Grad
- 1990: Andrzej Wyżykowski
- 1991: Rišardas Malachovskis (LTU)
- 1992: Michał Krukowski
- 1993: Grzegorz Stromiński
- 1994: Sebastian Chmara
- 1995: Grzegorz Stromiński
- 1996: Maciej Chmara
- 1997: Maciej Chmara
- 1998: Michał Modelski
- 1999: Michał Modelski
- 2000: Michał Modelski
- 2001: Michał Modelski
- 2002: Krzysztof Andrzejak
- 2003: Krzysztof Andrzejak
- 2004: Michał Modelski
- 2005: Łukasz Płaczek
- 2006: Łukasz Płaczek

=== 20 kilometres walk ===
The 1968 and 1983 races were held over short courses, but the champions remained valid.

- 1960: Franciszek Szyszka
- 1961: Franciszek Szyszka
- 1962: Franciszek Szyszka
- 1963: Wiesław Sarnecki
- 1964: Andrzej Czapliński
- 1965: Andrzej Czapliński
- 1966: Edmund Paziewski
- 1967: Andrzej Czapliński
- 1968: Edmund Paziewski
- 1969: Edmund Paziewski
- 1970: Andrzej Czapliński
- 1971: Jan Ornoch
- 1972: Jan Ornoch
- 1973: Jan Ornoch
- 1974: Jan Ornoch
- 1975: Daniel Bautista (MEX)
- 1976: Bohdan Bułakowski
- 1977: Jan Ornoch
- 1978: Jan Ornoch
- 1979: Bohdan Bułakowski
- 1980: Bohdan Bułakowski
- 1981: Bohdan Bułakowski
- 1982: Stanisław Rola
- 1983: Bogusław Duda
- 1984: Jan Klos
- 1985: Jan Klos
- 1986: Grzegorz Ledzion
- 1987: Jan Klos
- 1988: Zdzisław Szlapkin
- 1989: Zbigniew Sadlej
- 1990: Robert Korzeniowski
- 1991: Robert Korzeniowski
- 1992: Robert Korzeniowski
- 1993: Robert Korzeniowski
- 1994: Robert Korzeniowski
- 1995: Robert Korzeniowski
- 1996: Robert Korzeniowski
- 1997: Robert Korzeniowski
- 1998: Robert Korzeniowski
- 1999: Robert Korzeniowski
- 2000: Robert Korzeniowski
- 2001: Robert Korzeniowski
- 2002: Robert Korzeniowski
- 2003: Robert Korzeniowski
- 2004: Robert Korzeniowski
- 2005: Benjamin Kuciński
- 2006: Benjamin Kuciński

=== 50 kilometres walk ===
- 1972: Bogusław Kmiecik
- 1973: Bogusław Kmiecik
- 1974: Stanisław Korneluk
- 1975: Bogusław Kmiecik
- 1976: Bogusław Kmiecik
- 1977: Bogusław Kmiecik
- 1978: Jan Ornoch
- 1979: Bogusław Duda
- 1980: Feliks Śliwiński
- 1981: Krzysztof Drajski
- 1982: Bogusław Duda
- 1983: Bohdan Bułakowski
- 1984: Jan Klos
- 1985: Bohdan Bułakowski
- 1986: Grzegorz Ledzion
- 1987: Grzegorz Ledzion
- 1988: Jerzy Wróblewicz
- 1989: Jacek Bednarek
- 1990: Grzegorz Adam Urbanowski
- 1991: Jan Klos
- 1992: Tomasz Lipiec
- 1993: Robert Korzeniowski
- 1994: Sławomir Cielica
- 1995: Jan Holender
- 1996: Tomasz Lipiec
- 1997: Waldemar Dudek
- 1998: Roman Magdziarczyk
- 1999: Tomasz Lipiec
- 2000: Jan Holender
- 2001: Not held
- 2002: Grzegorz Sudoł
- 2003: Rafał Fedaczyński
- 2004: Kamil Kalka
- 2005: Kamil Kalka

== Women ==
=== 100 metres ===
- 1960: Teresa Ciepły
- 1961: Teresa Ciepły
- 1962: Teresa Ciepły
- 1963: Elżbieta Szyroka
- 1964: Halina Górecka
- 1965: Elżbieta Kolejwa
- 1966: Irena Szewińska
- 1967: Irena Szewińska
- 1968: Irena Szewińska
- 1969: Danuta Jędrejek
- 1970: Helena Fliśnik
- 1971: Helena Fliśnik
- 1972: Irena Szewińska
- 1973: Irena Szewińska
- 1974: Irena Szewińska
- 1975: Ewa Długołęcka
- 1976: Małgorzata Bogucka
- 1977: Małgorzata Bogucka
- 1978: Grażyna Rabsztyn
- 1979: Irena Szewińska
- 1980: Zofia Bielczyk
- 1981: Iwona Pakuła
- 1982: Iwona Pakuła
- 1983: Anna Ślipiko
- 1984: Elżbieta Tomczak
- 1985: Elżbieta Tomczak
- 1986: Ewa Kasprzyk
- 1987: Jolanta Janota
- 1988: Ewa Pisiewicz
- 1989: Joanna Smolarek
- 1990: Joanna Smolarek
- 1991: Joanna Smolarek
- 1992: Joanna Smolarek
- 1993: Dorota Krawczak
- 1994: Izabela Czajko
- 1995: Kinga Leszczyńska
- 1996: Kinga Leszczyńska
- 1997: Anna Leszczyńska
- 1998: Kinga Leszczyńska
- 1999: Zuzanna Radecka
- 2000: Zuzanna Radecka
- 2001: Agnieszka Rysiukiewicz
- 2002: Beata Szkudlarz
- 2003: Daria Korczyńska
- 2004: Daria Korczyńska
- 2005: Daria Korczyńska
- 2006: Daria Korczyńska

=== 200 metres ===
- 1960: Barbara Sobotta
- 1961: Barbara Sobotta
- 1962: Barbara Sobotta
- 1963: Barbara Sobotta
- 1964: Halina Górecka
- 1965: Elżbieta Kolejwa
- 1966: Irena Szewińska
- 1967: Mirosława Salacińska
- 1968: Irena Szewińska
- 1969: Mirosława Sarna
- 1970: Urszula Jóźwik
- 1971: Irena Szewińska
- 1972: Irena Szewińska
- 1973: Irena Szewińska
- 1974: Irena Szewińska
- 1975: Irena Szewińska
- 1976: Małgorzata Bogucka
- 1977: Małgorzata Bogucka
- 1978: Małgorzata Gajewska
- 1979: Irena Szewińska
- 1980: Zofia Bielczyk
- 1981: Agnieszka Siwek
- 1982: Iwona Pakuła
- 1983: Ewa Kasprzyk
- 1984: Ewa Kasprzyk
- 1985: Ewa Kasprzyk
- 1986: Ewa Kasprzyk
- 1987: Ewa Kasprzyk
- 1988: Agnieszka Siwek
- 1989: Ewa Kasprzyk
- 1990: Joanna Smolarek
- 1991: Joanna Smolarek
- 1992: Sylwia Pachut
- 1993: Izabela Czajko
- 1994: Izabela Czajko
- 1995: Kinga Leszczyńska
- 1996: Kinga Leszczyńska
- 1997: Kinga Leszczyńska
- 1998: Kinga Leszczyńska
- 1999: Zuzanna Radecka
- 2000: Zuzanna Radecka
- 2001: Joanna Niełacna
- 2002: Grażyna Prokopek
- 2003: Anna Guzowska
- 2004: Grażyna Prokopek
- 2005: Anna Guzowska
- 2006: Monika Bejnar

=== 400 metres ===
- 1960: Janina Hase
- 1961: Karolina Łukaszczyk
- 1962: Janina Hase
- 1963: Janina Hase
- 1964: Celina Jesionowska
- 1965: Celina Jesionowska
- 1966: Celina Jesionowska
- 1967: Czesława Nowak
- 1968: Czesława Nowak
- 1969: Elżbieta Katolik
- 1970: Czesława Nowak
- 1971: Krystyna Kacperczyk
- 1972: Aurelia Pentón (CUB)
- 1973: Krystyna Kacperczyk
- 1974: Krystyna Kacperczyk
- 1975: Danuta Piecyk
- 1976: Genowefa Błaszak
- 1977: Krystyna Kacperczyk
- 1978: Irena Szewińska
- 1979: Grażyna Oliszewska
- 1980: Małgorzata Dunecka
- 1981: Grażyna Oliszewska
- 1982: Genowefa Błaszak
- 1983: Elżbieta Kapusta
- 1984: Genowefa Błaszak
- 1985: Małgorzata Dunecka
- 1986: Marzena Wojdecka
- 1987: Genowefa Błaszak
- 1988: Genowefa Błaszak
- 1989: Elżbieta Kilińska
- 1990: Renata Sosin
- 1991: Elżbieta Kilińska
- 1992: Elżbieta Kilińska
- 1993: Elżbieta Kilińska
- 1994: Elżbieta Kilińska
- 1995: Barbara Grzywocz
- 1996: Sylwia Kwilińska
- 1997: Inga Tarnawska
- 1998: Grażyna Prokopek
- 1999: Grażyna Prokopek
- 2000: Grażyna Prokopek
- 2001: Grażyna Prokopek
- 2002: Grażyna Prokopek
- 2003: Monika Bejnar
- 2004: Monika Bejnar
- 2005: Anna Guzowska
- 2006: Anna Jesień

=== 800 metres ===
- 1960: Krystyna Nowakowska
- 1961: Zofia Walasek
- 1962: Krystyna Nowakowska
- 1963: Henryka Jóźwik
- 1964: Danuta Sobieska
- 1965: Danuta Sobieska
- 1966: Danuta Sobieska
- 1967: Danuta Sobieska
- 1968: Zofia Kołakowska
- 1969: Zofia Kołakowska
- 1970: Danuta Wierzbowska
- 1971: Elżbieta Katolik
- 1972: Danuta Wierzbowska
- 1973: Danuta Wierzbowska
- 1974: Jolanta Januchta
- 1975: Elżbieta Katolik
- 1976: Elżbieta Katolik
- 1977: Jolanta Januchta
- 1978: Jolanta Januchta
- 1979: Jolanta Januchta
- 1980: Jolanta Januchta
- 1981: Anna Rybicka
- 1982: Wanda Stefańska
- 1983: Jolanta Januchta
- 1984: Brygida Bąk
- 1985: Wanda Wójtowiec
- 1986: Grażyna Kowina
- 1987: Wanda Wójtowiec
- 1988: Małgorzata Rydz
- 1989: Dorota Buczkowska
- 1990: Joanna Siemieniuk
- 1991: Małgorzata Rydz
- 1992: Małgorzata Rydz
- 1993: Małgorzata Rydz
- 1994: Anna Jakubczak
- 1995: Małgorzata Rydz
- 1996: Lidia Chojecka
- 1997: Anna Jakubczak
- 1998: Aleksandra Dereń
- 1999: Anna Jakubczak
- 2000: Anna Rostkowska
- 2001: Anna Rostkowska
- 2002: Anna Rostkowska
- 2003: Anna Rostkowska
- 2004: Anna Rostkowska
- 2005: Ewelina Sętowska-Dryk
- 2006: Aneta Lemiesz

=== 1500 metres ===
- 1969: Zofia Kołakowska
- 1970: Danuta Wierzbowska
- 1971: Danuta Wierzbowska
- 1972: Jenny Orr (AUS)
- 1973: Bronisława Ludwichowska
- 1974: Czesława Surdel
- 1975: Bronisława Ludwichowska
- 1976: Bronisława Ludwichowska
- 1977: Celina Sokołowska
- 1978: Jolanta Januchta
- 1979: Celina Sokołowska
- 1980: Anna Bukis
- 1981: Stanisława Fedyk
- 1982: Maria Bąk
- 1983: Jolanta Januchta
- 1984: Danuta Piotrowska
- 1985: Barbara Klepka
- 1986: Barbara Klepka
- 1987: Anna Rybicka
- 1988: Małgorzata Rydz
- 1989: Małgorzata Rydz
- 1990: Małgorzata Rydz
- 1991: Małgorzata Rydz
- 1992: Małgorzata Rydz
- 1993: Małgorzata Rydz
- 1994: Małgorzata Rydz
- 1995: Małgorzata Rydz
- 1996: Małgorzata Rydz
- 1997: Małgorzata Rydz
- 1998: Anna Jakubczak
- 1999: Lidia Chojecka
- 2000: Lidia Chojecka
- 2001: Justyna Bąk
- 2002: Lidia Chojecka
- 2003: Justyna Lesman
- 2004: Anna Jakubczak
- 2005: Wioletta Frankiewicz
- 2006: Sylwia Ejdys

=== 3000 metres ===
- 1973: Bronisława Ludwichowska
- 1974: Urzsula Prasek
- 1975: Bronisława Ludwichowska
- 1976: Renata Walendziak
- 1977: Celina Sokołowska
- 1978: Celina Sokołowska
- 1979: Celina Sokołowska
- 1980: Ewa Szydłowska
- 1981: Stanisława Fedyk
- 1982: Maria Bąk
- 1983: Maria Bąk
- 1984: Wanda Panfil
- 1985: Renata Kokowska
- 1986: Renata Kokowska
- 1987: Wanda Panfil
- 1988: Grażyna Kowina
- 1989: Bożena Dziubińska
- 1990: Grażyna Kowina
- 1991: Grażyna Kowina
- 1992: Aniela Nikiel
- 1993: Anna Brzezińska
- 1994: Aniela Nikiel

=== 5000 metres ===
- 1984: Renata Kokowska
- 1985: Wanda Panfil
- 1986: Renata Kokowska
- 1987: Wanda Panfil
- 1988: Wanda Panfil
- 1989: Wanda Panfil
- 1990: Grażyna Kowina
- 1991: Not held
- 1992: Not held
- 1993: Not held
- 1994: Not held
- 1995: Dorota Gruca
- 1996: Danuta Marczyk
- 1997: Justyna Bąk
- 1998: Dorota Gruca
- 1999: Dorota Gruca
- 2000: Justyna Bąk
- 2001: Justyna Bąk
- 2002: Wioletta Frankiewicz
- 2003: Grażyna Syrek
- 2004: Wioletta Frankiewicz
- 2005: Justyna Bąk
- 2006: Grażyna Syrek

=== 10,000 metres ===
- 1984: Renata Kokowska
- 1985: Renata Kokowska
- 1986: Renata Kokowska
- 1987: Renata Kokowska
- 1988: Renata Kokowska
- 1989: Lidia Camberg
- 1990: Anna Rybicka
- 1991: Irena Czuta
- 1992: Anna Rybicka
- 1993: Anna Rybicka
- 1994: Aniela Nikiel
- 1995: Dorota Gruca
- 1996: Dorota Gruca
- 1997: Renata Sobiesiak
- 1998: Dorota Gruca
- 1999: Dorota Gruca
- 2000: Justyna Bąk
- 2001: Dorota Gruca
- 2002: Marzena Michalska
- 2003: Patrycja Włodarczyk
- 2004: Dorota Gruca
- 2005: Grażyna Syrek
- 2006: Grażyna Syrek

=== 20K run ===
- 1984: Gabriela Górzyńska
- 1985: Gabriela Górzyńska
- 1986: Anna Iskra
- 1987: Anna Busko
- 1988: Wanda Panfil
- 1989: Gabriela Górzyńska
- 1990: Anna Rybicka
- 1991: Izabela Zatorska

=== Half marathon ===
- 1992: Kamila Gradus
- 1993: Czesława Mentlewicz
- 1994: Izabela Zatorska
- 1995: Aniela Nikiel
- 1996: Dorota Gruca
- 1997: Renata Sobiesiak
- 1998: Elżbieta Jarosz
- 1999: Małgorzata Sobańska
- 2000: Dorota Gruca
- 2001: Dorota Gruca
- 2002: Monika Stefanowicz
- 2003: Dorota Gruca
- 2004: Małgorzata Sobańska
- 2005: Grażyna Syrek

=== Marathon ===
The 1992 marathon race was held on a short course, but the champion remained valid.

- 1982: Anna Bełtowska
- 1983: Renata Walendziak
- 1984: Gabriela Górzyńska
- 1985: Renata Walendziak
- 1986: Renata Walendziak
- 1987: Ewa Szydłowska
- 1988: Wanda Panfil
- 1989: Krystyna Chylińska
- 1990: Krystyna Kuta
- 1991: Ewa Olas
- 1992: Ewa Olas
- 1993: Wioletta Uryga
- 1994: Aniela Nikiel
- 1995: Wioletta Uryga
- 1996: Joanna Chmiel
- 1997: Aniela Nikiel
- 1998: Małgorzata Birbach
- 1999: Wioletta Kryza
- 2000: Janina Malska
- 2001: Elżbieta Jarosz
- 2002: Grażyna Syrek
- 2003: Grażyna Syrek
- 2004: Monika Stefanowicz
- 2005: Janina Malska

=== 3000 metres steeplechase ===
- 1999: Justyna Bąk
- 2000: Małgorzata Jamróz
- 2001: Patrycja Włodarczyk
- 2002: Julia Budniak
- 2003: Patrycja Włodarczyk
- 2004: Justyna Bąk
- 2005: Katarzyna Kowalska
- 2006: Wioletta Frankiewicz

=== 80 metres hurdles ===
- 1960: Barbara Sosgórnik
- 1961: Teresa Ciepły
- 1962: Teresa Ciepły
- 1963: Maria Piątkowska
- 1964: Teresa Ciepły
- 1965: Teresa Ciepły
- 1966: Elżbieta Żebrowska
- 1967: Teresa Nowak
- 1968: Teresa Sukniewicz

=== 100 metres hurdles ===
- 1969: Teresa Nowak
- 1970: Teresa Sukniewicz
- 1971: Danuta Straszyńska
- 1972: Danuta Straszyńska
- 1973: Grażyna Rabsztyn
- 1974: Teresa Nowak
- 1975: Grażyna Rabsztyn
- 1976: Grażyna Rabsztyn
- 1977: Bożena Nowakowska
- 1978: Grażyna Rabsztyn
- 1979: Grażyna Rabsztyn
- 1980: Grażyna Rabsztyn
- 1981: Elżbieta Rabsztyn
- 1982: Lucyna Langer
- 1983: Lucyna Langer
- 1984: Lucyna Langer
- 1985: Sylwia Bednarska
- 1986: Małgorzata Guzowska
- 1987: Barbara Latos
- 1988: Grażyna Tadrzak
- 1989: Maria Kamrowska
- 1990: Maria Kamrowska
- 1991: Urszula Włodarczyk
- 1992: Aldona Fogiel
- 1993: Maria Kamrowska
- 1994: Maria Kamrowska
- 1995: Aldona Fogiel
- 1996: Aldona Fogiel
- 1997: Anna Leszczyńska
- 1998: Anna Leszczyńska
- 1999: Anna Leszczyńska
- 2000: Aneta Sosnowska
- 2001: Aneta Sosnowska
- 2002: Aurelia Trywiańska
- 2003: Aurelia Trywiańska
- 2004: Aurelia Trywiańska
- 2005: Aurelia Trywiańska
- 2006: Aurelia Trywiańska

=== 200 metres hurdles ===
- 1970: Teresa Sukniewicz
- 1971: Danuta Straszyńska

=== 400 metres hurdles ===
- 1973: Danuta Piecyk
- 1974: Danuta Piecyk
- 1975: Danuta Piecyk
- 1976: Genowefa Błaszak
- 1977: Elżbieta Katolik
- 1978: Krystyna Kacperczyk
- 1979: Elżbieta Katolik
- 1980: Barbara Kwietniewska
- 1981: Genowefa Błaszak
- 1982: Anna Maniecka
- 1983: Genowefa Błaszak
- 1984: Jolanta Stalmach
- 1985: Genowefa Błaszak
- 1986: Genowefa Błaszak
- 1987: Małgorzata Dunecka
- 1988: Genowefa Błaszak
- 1989: Beata Knapczyk
- 1990: Agata Sadurska
- 1991: Monika Warnicka
- 1992: Monika Warnicka
- 1993: Sylwia Pachut
- 1994: Monika Warnicka
- 1995: Monika Warnicka
- 1996: Monika Warnicka
- 1997: Monika Warnicka
- 1998: Małgorzata Pskit
- 1999: Anna Jesień
- 2000: Anna Jesień
- 2001: Małgorzata Pskit
- 2002: Anna Jesień
- 2003: Anna Jesień
- 2004: Małgorzata Pskit
- 2005: Anna Jesień
- 2006: Marta Chrust-Rożej

=== High jump ===
- 1960: Jarosława Jóźwiakowska
- 1961: Jarosława Jóźwiakowska
- 1962: Jarosława Jóźwiakowska
- 1963: Iwona Ronczewska
- 1964: Jarosława Jóźwiakowska
- 1965: Jarosława Jóźwiakowska
- 1966: Jarosława Jóźwiakowska
- 1967: Maria Zielińska
- 1968: Danuta Berezowska-Prociów
- 1969: Danuta Berezowska-Prociów
- 1970: Danuta Hołowińska
- 1971: Danuta Berezowska-Prociów
- 1972: Danuta Hołowińska
- 1973: Anna Bubala
- 1974: Grith Ejstrup (DEN)
- 1975: Anna Pstuś
- 1976: Eugenia Więcek
- 1977: Danuta Bułkowska
- 1978: Urszula Kielan
- 1979: Elżbieta Trylińska
- 1980: Urszula Kielan
- 1981: Elżbieta Trylińska
- 1982: Danuta Bułkowska
- 1983: Danuta Bułkowska
- 1984: Danuta Bułkowska
- 1985: Danuta Bułkowska
- 1986: Danuta Bułkowska
- 1987: Danuta Bułkowska
- 1988: Danuta Bułkowska
- 1989: Danuta Bułkowska
- 1990: Beata Hołub
- 1991: Beata Hołub
- 1992: Beata Hołub
- 1993: Beata Hołub
- 1994: Iwona Kielan
- 1995: Donata Jancewicz
- 1996: Donata Jancewicz
- 1997: Agnieszka Giedrojć
- 1998: Donata Jancewicz
- 1999: Donata Jancewicz
- 2000: Donata Jancewicz
- 2001: Anna Ksok
- 2002: Agnieszka Falasa
- 2003: Anna Ksok
- 2004: Anna Ksok
- 2005: Anna Ksok
- 2006: Karolina Gronau

=== Pole vault ===
- 1995: Anna Skrzyńska
- 1996: Anna Wielgus
- 1997: Anna Wielgus
- 1998: Anna Wielgus
- 1999: Monika Pyrek
- 2000: Monika Pyrek
- 2001: Monika Pyrek
- 2002: Monika Pyrek
- 2003: Agnieszka Wrona
- 2004: Monika Pyrek
- 2005: Monika Pyrek
- 2006: Monika Pyrek

=== Long jump ===
- 1960: Maria Kusion-Bibro
- 1961: Maria Kusion-Bibro
- 1962: Elżbieta Krzesińska
- 1963: Elżbieta Krzesińska
- 1964: Mirosława Sarna
- 1965: Irena Szewińska
- 1966: Ryszarda Warzocha
- 1967: Irena Szewińska
- 1968: Mirosława Sarna
- 1969: Mirosława Sarna
- 1970: Helena Fliśnik
- 1971: Irena Szewińska
- 1972: Marcia Garbey (CUB)
- 1973: Mirosława Sarna
- 1974: Maria Zukowska
- 1975: Maria Długosielska
- 1976: Ewa Garczyńska
- 1977: Barbara Sochaczewska
- 1978: Teresa Marciniak
- 1979: Anna Włodarczyk
- 1980: Barbara Baran-Wojnar
- 1981: Anna Włodarczyk
- 1982: Teresa Lewicka
- 1983: Elżbieta Klimaszewska
- 1984: Anna Włodarczyk
- 1985: Agata Karczmarek
- 1986: Agata Karczmarek
- 1987: Agata Karczmarek
- 1988: Agata Karczmarek
- 1989: Agata Karczmarek
- 1990: Renata Nielsen
- 1991: Agata Karczmarek
- 1992: Agata Karczmarek
- 1993: Agata Karczmarek
- 1994: Agata Karczmarek
- 1995: Agata Karczmarek
- 1996: Agata Karczmarek
- 1997: Agata Karczmarek
- 1998: Dorota Brodowska
- 1999: Agata Karczmarek
- 2000: Agata Karczmarek
- 2001: Liliana Zagacka
- 2002: Liliana Zagacka
- 2003: Liliana Zagacka
- 2004: Liliana Zagacka
- 2005: Małgorzata Trybańska-Strońska
- 2006: Małgorzata Trybańska-Strońska

=== Triple jump ===
- 1991: Urszula Włodarczyk
- 1992: Urszula Włodarczyk
- 1993: Agnieszka Stańczyk
- 1994: Urszula Włodarczyk
- 1995: Ilona Pazoła
- 1996: Ilona Pazoła
- 1997: Aneta Sadach
- 1998: Ilona Pazoła
- 1999: Ilona Pazoła
- 2000: Liliana Zagacka
- 2001: Liliana Zagacka
- 2002: Liliana Zagacka
- 2003: Liliana Zagacka
- 2004: Liliana Zagacka
- 2005: Aleksandra Fila
- 2006: Aneta Sadach

=== Shot put ===
- 1960: Eugenia Rusin
- 1961: Jadwiga Klimaj
- 1962: Stefania Kiewłeń
- 1963: Jadwiga Klimaj
- 1964: Stefania Kiewłeń
- 1965: Eugenia Rusin
- 1966: Eugenia Rusin
- 1967: Eugenia Rusin
- 1968: Elżbieta Michalczak
- 1969: Elżbieta Michalczak
- 1970: Ludwika Chewińska
- 1971: Ludwika Chewińska
- 1972: Ludwika Chewińska
- 1973: Ludwika Chewińska
- 1974: Ludwika Chewińska
- 1975: Ludwika Chewińska
- 1976: Ludwika Chewińska
- 1977: Beata Habrzyk
- 1978: Beata Habrzyk
- 1979: Beata Habrzyk
- 1980: Ludwika Chewińska
- 1981: Ludwika Chewińska
- 1982: Ludwika Chewińska
- 1983: Ludwika Chewińska
- 1984: Bogumiła Suska
- 1985: Małgorzata Wolska
- 1986: Małgorzata Wolska
- 1987: Małgorzata Wolska
- 1988: Małgorzata Wolska
- 1989: Mirosława Znojek
- 1990: Małgorzata Wolska
- 1991: Krystyna Zabawska
- 1992: Krystyna Zabawska
- 1993: Krystyna Zabawska
- 1994: Krystyna Zabawska
- 1995: Katarzyna Żakowicz
- 1996: Krystyna Zabawska
- 1997: Krystyna Zabawska
- 1998: Krystyna Zabawska
- 1999: Krystyna Zabawska
- 2000: Krystyna Zabawska
- 2001: Krystyna Zabawska
- 2002: Krystyna Zabawska
- 2003: Krystyna Zabawska
- 2004: Krystyna Zabawska
- 2005: Magdalena Sobieszek
- 2006: Krystyna Zabawska

=== Discus throw ===
- 1960: Helena Dmowska
- 1961: Kazimiera Rykowska
- 1962: Kazimiera Rykowska
- 1963: Kazimiera Rykowska
- 1964: Kazimiera Rykowska
- 1965: Kazimiera Rykowska
- 1966: Kazimiera Rykowska
- 1967: Jadwiga Wójtczak
- 1968: Jadwiga Wójtczak
- 1969: Jadwiga Wójtczak
- 1970: Jadwiga Wójtczak
- 1971: Krystyna Nadolna
- 1972: Krystyna Nadolna
- 1973: Krystyna Nadolna
- 1974: Danuta Rosani
- 1975: Halina Barucha
- 1976: Danuta Rosani
- 1977: Krystyna Nadolna
- 1978: Danuta Rosani
- 1979: Danuta Majewska
- 1980: Danuta Majewska
- 1981: Danuta Majewska
- 1982: Ewa Siepsiak
- 1983: Danuta Majewska
- 1984: Ewa Siepsiak
- 1985: Renata Katewicz
- 1986: Renata Katewicz
- 1987: Renata Katewicz
- 1988: Renata Katewicz
- 1989: Ewa Siepsiak
- 1990: Anna Zaczek
- 1991: Paulina Gugniewicz
- 1992: Renata Katewicz
- 1993: Marzena Wysocka
- 1994: Marzena Wysocka
- 1995: Joanna Wiśniewska
- 1996: Renata Katewicz
- 1997: Renata Katewicz
- 1998: Marzena Zbrojewska
- 1999: Joanna Wiśniewska
- 2000: Joanna Wiśniewska
- 2001: Marzena Wysocka
- 2002: Joanna Wiśniewska
- 2003: Marzena Wysocka
- 2004: Wioletta Potępa
- 2005: Marzena Wysocka
- 2006: Wioletta Potępa

=== Hammer throw ===
- 1995: Elżbieta Wolnik
- 1996: Kamila Skolimowska
- 1997: Kamila Skolimowska
- 1998: Jolanta Borawska
- 1999: Kamila Skolimowska
- 2000: Kamila Skolimowska
- 2001: Kamila Skolimowska
- 2002: Kamila Skolimowska
- 2003: Kamila Skolimowska
- 2004: Kamila Skolimowska
- 2005: Kamila Skolimowska
- 2006: Kamila Skolimowska

=== Javelin throw ===
- 1960: Urszula Figwer
- 1961: Teresa Tubek
- 1962: Ksawera Grochal
- 1963: Ksawera Grochal
- 1964: Daniela Jaworska
- 1965: Lucyna Krawcewicz
- 1966: Daniela Jaworska
- 1967: Daniela Jaworska
- 1968: Daniela Jaworska
- 1969: Daniela Jaworska
- 1970: Daniela Jaworska
- 1971: Daniela Jaworska
- 1972: Ewa Gryziecka
- 1973: Daniela Jaworska
- 1974: Ute Hommola (GDR)
- 1975: Ewa Gryziecka
- 1976: Daniela Jaworska
- 1977: Bernadetta Blechacz
- 1978: Bernadetta Blechacz
- 1979: Bernadetta Blechacz
- 1980: Bernadetta Blechacz
- 1981: Bernadetta Blechacz
- 1982: Genowefa Patla
- 1983: Genowefa Patla
- 1984: Genowefa Patla
- 1985: Genowefa Patla
- 1986: Genowefa Patla
- 1987: Małgorzata Kiełczewska
- 1988: Genowefa Patla
- 1989: Mariola Dankiewicz
- 1990: Genowefa Patla
- 1991: Genowefa Patla
- 1992: Genowefa Patla
- 1993: Genowefa Patla
- 1994: Genowefa Patla
- 1995: Genowefa Patla
- 1996: Ewa Rybak
- 1997: Ewa Rybak
- 1998: Ewa Rybak
- 1999: Genowefa Patla
- 2000: Genowefa Patla
- 2001: Monika Mrówka
- 2002: Ewa Rybak
- 2003: Barbara Madejczyk
- 2004: Barbara Madejczyk
- 2005: Barbara Madejczyk
- 2006: Barbara Madejczyk

=== Pentathlon ===
- 1960: Barbara Sosgórnik
- 1961: Maria Kusion-Bibro
- 1962: Elżbieta Krzesińska
- 1963: Apolonia Winiarska
- 1964: Halina Krzyzańska
- 1965: Łucja Noworyta
- 1966: Mirosława Sarna
- 1967: Bożena Woźniak
- 1968: Małgorzata Majchrzak
- 1969: Lucyna Koczwara
- 1970: Ryszarda Rurka
- 1971: Barbara Waśniewska
- 1972: Bożena Kania
- 1973: Małgorzata Majchrzak
- 1974: Diane Jones-Konihowski (CAN)
- 1975: Vanda Nováková (TCH)
- 1976: Grażyna Niestój
- 1977: Grażyna Niestój
- 1978: Danuta Cały
- 1979: Danuta Cały

=== Heptathlon ===
- 1980: Małgorzata Guzowska
- 1981: Małgorzata Guzowska
- 1982: Małgorzata Guzowska
- 1983: Małgorzata Guzowska
- 1984: Małgorzata Guzowska
- 1985: Lidia Bierka
- 1986: Lidia Bierka
- 1987: Małgorzata Lisowska
- 1988: Urszula Włodarczyk
- 1989: Lidia Frank
- 1990: Urszula Włodarczyk
- 1991: Urszula Włodarczyk
- 1992: Urszula Włodarczyk
- 1993: Urszula Włodarczyk
- 1994: Elżbieta Rączka
- 1995: Bożena Bogucka
- 1996: Urszula Włodarczyk
- 1997: Urszula Włodarczyk
- 1998: Elżbieta Rączka
- 1999: Elżbieta Rączka
- 2000: Elżbieta Rączka
- 2001: Izabella Obłękowska
- 2002: Magdalena Szczepańska
- 2003: Magdalena Szczepańska
- 2004: Magdalena Szczepańska
- 2005: Magdalena Szczepańska
- 2006: Karolina Tymińska

=== 5000 metres walk ===
- 1981: Agnieszka Wyszyńska
- 1982: Agnieszka Wyszyńska
- 1983: Agnieszka Wyszyńska
- 1984: Beata Bączyk
- 1985: Kazimiera Mróz
- 1986: Zofia Wolan
- 1987: Zofia Wolan
- 1988: Kazimiera Mosio
- 1989: Kazimiera Mosio
- 1990: Katarzyna Radtke
- 1991: Katarzyna Radtke
- 1992: Katarzyna Radtke
- 1993: Katarzyna Radtke
- 1994: Katarzyna Radtke
- 1995: Katarzyna Radtke
- 1996: Bożena Górecka

=== 10 kilometres walk ===
The 1989 race was held on a track.

- 1981: Agnieszka Wyszyńska
- 1982: Agnieszka Wyszyńska
- 1983: Agnieszka Wyszyńska
- 1984: Beata Bączyk
- 1985: Ewa Musur
- 1986: Renata Rogoz
- 1987: Zofia Wolan
- 1988: Ewa Musur
- 1989: Kazimiera Mosio
- 1990: Jolanta Frysztak
- 1991: Katarzyna Radtke
- 1992: Katarzyna Radtke
- 1993: Katarzyna Radtke
- 1994: Katarzyna Radtke
- 1995: Katarzyna Radtke
- 1996: Katarzyna Radtke
- 1997: Agnieszka Andula
- 1998: Katarzyna Radtke
- 1999: Katarzyna Radtke
- 2000: Katarzyna Radtke
- 2001: Joanna Baj

=== 20 kilometres walk ===
- 1998: Katarzyna Radtke
- 1999: Katarzyna Radtke
- 2000: Sylwia Korzeniowska
- 2001: Joanna Baj
- 2002: Sylwia Korzeniowska
- 2003: Sylwia Korzeniowska
- 2004: Sylwia Korzeniowska
- 2005: Agnieszka Olesz
- 2006: Agnieszka Olesz
