= 1993 European Cup Super League =

These are the full results of the 1993 European Cup Super League in athletics which was held on 26 and 27 June 1993 at the Olympic Stadium in Rome, Italy.

== Team standings ==
Men
Pos.	Nation	Points
1	Russia	128
2	Great Britain	124
3	France	123
4	Germany	119
5	Italy	112
6	Ukraine	97
7	Spain	76
8	Poland	65
9	Czech Republic	54

Women
Pos.	Nation	Points
1	Russia	141
2	Romania	102
3	Ukraine	97,5
4	Germany	96
5	Great Britain	91
6	France	75
7	Poland	62
8	Italy	55.5
9	Finland	44

The dissolved Soviet Union was replaced by Russia and Ukraine which resulted in 9 teams competing. As a result, three teams had to be relegated to the first league.

== Men's results ==
=== 100 metres ===
26 June
Wind: +1.3 m/s

Rank	Name	Nationality	Time	Notes	Points
1	Linford Christie	Great Britain	10.22		9
2	Aleksandr Porkhomovskiy	Russia	10.28		8
3	Daniel Sangouma	France	10.42		7
4	Marc Blume	Germany	10.44		6
5	Ezio Madonia	Italy	10.45		5
6	Dmytro Vanyaikin	Ukraine	10.49		4
7	Jirí Valík	Czech Republic	10.50		3
8	Enrique Talavera	Spain	10.56		2
9	Marek Zalewski	Poland	13.72		1

=== 200 metres ===
27 June
Wind: -0.9 m/s

Rank	Name	Nationality	Time	Notes	Points
1	John Regis	Great Britain	20.38		9
2	Andrey Fedoriv	Russia	20.54		8
3	Robert Kurnicki	Germany	20.59		7
4	Daniel Sangouma	France	20.72		6
5	Vladyslav Dolohodin	Ukraine	20.86		5
6	Jirí Valík	Czech Republic	21.10		4
7	Robert Mackowiak	Poland	21.21		3
8	Jordi Mayoral	Spain	21.24		2
	Giorgio Marras	Italy	DNF		0

=== 400 metres ===
26 June

Rank	Name	Nationality	Time	Notes	Points
1	David Grindley	Great Britain	44.75	CR	9
2	Dmitriy Golovastov	Russia	45.65		8
3	Jean-Louis Rapnouil	France	45.91		7
4	Andrea Nuti	Italy	46.07		6
5	Cayetano Cornet	Spain	46.46		5
6	Tomasz Czubak	Poland	46.63		4
7	Ralph Pfersich	Germany	46.73		3
8	Valeriy Kozlov	Ukraine	47.48		2
9	Ondrej Veselý	Czech Republic	47.84		1

=== 800 metres ===
27 June

Rank	Name	Nationality	Time	Notes	Points
1	Andriy Bulkovskyi	Ukraine	1:47.32		9
2	Andrea Benvenuti	Italy	1:47.63		8
3	Tom McKean	Great Britain	1:47.67		7
4	Jens-Peter Herold	Germany	1:47.75		6
5	Ousmane Diarra	France	1:47.88		5
6	Aleksey Oleynikov	Russia	1:48.26		4
7	Piotr Piekarski	Poland	1:48.29		3
8	Luis Javier González	Spain	1:49.02		2
9	Václav Hrích	Czech Republic	1:49.30		1

=== 1500 metres ===
26 June

Rank	Name	Nationality	Time	Notes	Points
1	Andriy Bulkovskyi	Ukraine	3:37.51		9
2	Fermín Cacho	Spain	3:38.09		8
3	Pascal Thiebaut	France	3:38.12		7
4	Alessandro Lambruschini	Italy	3:38.37		6
5	Curtis Robb	Great Britain	3:38.56		5
6	Hauke Fuhlbrügge	Germany	3:38.57		4
7	Sergey Melnikov	Russia	3:39.70		3
8	Waldemar Glinka	Poland	3:41.09		2
9	Milan Drahonovský	Czech Republic	3:42.85		1

=== 5000 metres ===
27 June

Rank	Name	Nationality	Time	Notes	Points
1	Robert Denmark	Great Britain	13:30.02		9
2	Alessandro Lambruschini	Italy	13:30.96		8
3	Abel Antón	Spain	13:31.35		7
4	Michal Bartoszak	Poland	13:31.78		6
5	Mikhail Dasko	Russia	13:33.92		5
6	Jan Pešava	Czech Republic	13:35.28		4
7	Stephan Freigang	Germany	13:38.76		3
8	Thierry Pantel	France	13:45.04		2
9	Yevgeniy Sirotin	Ukraine	13:56.57		1

=== 10,000 metres ===
26 June

Rank	Name	Nationality	Time	Notes	Points
1	Thierry Pantel	France	28:02.71		9
2	Francesco Panetta	Italy	28:13.99		8
3	Carlos Adán	Spain	28:16.19		7
4	Oleg Strizhakov	Russia	28:24.59		6
5	Stéphane Franke	Germany	28:46.43		5
6	Michal Kucera	Czech Republic	28:46.43		4
7	Petro Sarafyniuk	Ukraine	29:09.23		3
8	Krzysztof Baldyga	Poland	29:29.70		2
	Eamonn Martin	Great Britain	DNF		0

=== 110 metres hurdles ===
27 June
Wind: -0.2 m/s

Rank	Name	Nationality	Time	Notes	Points
1	Colin Jackson	Great Britain	13.10	CR	9
2	Florian Schwarthoff	Germany	13.50		8
3	Dan Philibert	France	13.62		7
4	Vladimir Shishkin	Russia	13.65		6
5	Gennadiy Dakshevich	Ukraine	13.79		5
6	Jirí Hudec	Czech Republic	13.90		4
7	Fausto Frigerio	Italy	13.96		3
8	Carlos Sala	Spain	14.07		2
9	Ronald Mehlich	Poland	14.09		1

=== 400 metres hurdles ===
26 June

Rank	Name	Nationality	Time	Notes	Points
1	Stéphane Diagana	France	48.08	NR	9
2	Olaf Hense	Germany	48.48		8
3	Oleh Tverdokhlib	Ukraine	48.70		7
4	Kriss Akabusi	Great Britain	48.73		6
5	Giorgio Frinolli	Italy	49.22		5
6	Piotr Kotlarski	Poland	50.31		4
7	Oscar Pitillas	Spain	50.70		3
8	Aleksandr Belikov	Russia	50.93		2
9	Radek Bartakovic	Czech Republic	52.81		1

=== 3000 metres steeplechase ===
27 June

Rank	Name	Nationality	Time	Notes	Points
1	Steffen Brand	Germany	8:17.77		9
2	Francesco Panetta	Italy	8:22.95		8
3	Thierry Brusseau	France	8:24.60		7
4	Inocencio López	Spain	8:32.03		6
5	Vladimir Pronin	Russia	8:33.03		5
6	Tom Buckner	Great Britain	8:33.39		4
7	Oleksiy Patserin	Ukraine	8:35.32		3
8	Jirí Šoptenko	Czech Republic	8:43.06		2
9	Artur Osman	Poland	8:49.47		1

=== 4 × 100 metres relay ===
26 June

Rank	Nation	Athletes	Time	Note	Points
1	Great Britain	Jason John, Tony Jarrett, John Regis, Linford Christie	38.72		9
2	France	Éric Perrot, Daniel Sangouma, Jean-Charles Trouabal, Bruno Marie-Rose	38.72		8
3	Russia	Pavel Galkin, Edvin Ivanov, Andrey Fedoriv, Aleksandr Prokhomovskiy	38.89	NR	7
4	Germany	Holger Blume, Robert Kurnicki, Michael Huke, Marc Blume	39.01		6
5	Ukraine	Viktor Bryzhin, Dmytro Vanyaikin, Aleksandr Shlychkov, Vladyslav Dolohodin	39.10	NR	5
6	Italy	Mario Longo, Ezio Madonia, Giovanni Puggioni, Marco Menchini	39.36		4
7	Poland	Marcin Krzywanski, Robert Mackowiak, Marcin Czajkowski, Jaroslaw Kaniecki	39.78		3
8	Spain	Luis Turon, Pedro Pablo Nolet, Jordi Mayoral, Enrique Talavera	39.83		2
9	Czech Republic	Valter Pilch, Luboš Ruda, Jirí Ondrácek, Jirí Valík	40.49		1

=== 4 × 400 metres relay ===
27 June

Rank	Nation	Athletes	Time	Note	Points
1	Great Britain	Du'aine Ladejo, Kriss Akabusi, John Regis, David Grindley	3:00.25	CR	9
2	Russia	Dmitriy Kliger, Dmitriy Kosov, Mikhail Vdovin, Dmitriy Golovastov	3:00.75	NR	8
3	France	Jean-Louis Rapnouil, Pierre Hilaire, André Jaffory, Stéphane Diagana	3:00.94		7
4	Germany	Ralph Pfersich, Daniel Bittner, Rico Lieder, Olaf Hense	3:01.33		6
5	Italy	Andrea Montanari, Marco Vaccari, Fabio Grossi, Andrea Nuti	3:02.97		5
6	Spain	Antonio Sánchez, Cayetano Cornet, Manuel Moreno, Ángel Heras	3:05.96		4
7	Poland	Sylwester Wegrzyn, Pawel Januszewski, Artur Gasiewski, Tomasz Czubak	3:09.29		3
8	Ukraine	Roman Galkin, Vadim Ogiy, Vladimir Dorosh, Valeriy Kozlov	3:09.65		2
9	Czech Republic	Jirí Benda, Václav Hrích, Vilem Ondrácek, Ondrej Veselý	3:11.22		1

=== High jump ===
26 June

Rank	Name	Nationality	2.05	2.10	2.15	2.20	2.23	2.26	2.28	2.30	2.32	2.34	Result	Notes	Points
1	Artur Partyka	Poland	–	–	o	–	–	o	–	o	–	xxx	2.30		9
2	Jean-Charles Gicquel	France	–	–	o	o	xo	o	o	o	xxx		2.30		8
3	Roberto Ferrari	Italy	–	o	o	o	o	xo	xxo	o	–	xxx	2.30		7
4	Wolf-Hendrik Beyer	Germany	–	–	o	o	o	o	xo	xx–	x		2.28		6
5	Aleksey Yemelin	Russia	–	–	o	o	xxo	o	xo	xxx			2.28		5
6	Steve Smith	Great Britain	–	–	o	–	xxo	–	xxo	x–	xx		2.28		4
7	Arturo Ortiz	Spain	–	o	o	xo	–	x–	xx				2.20		3
8	Tomáš Janku	Czech Republic	o	o	xo	xo	xxx						2.20		2
9	Yuriy Sergiyenko	Ukraine	–	o	o	xxx							2.15		1

=== Pole vault ===
27 June

Rank	Name	Nationality	5.00	5.20	5.30	5.40	5.50	5.60	5.70	5.80	5.90	6.00	6.05	6.10	Result	Notes	Points
1	Radion Gataullin	Russia	–	–	–	–	–	o	–	o	x–	o	–	xr	6.00	CR	9
2	Sergey Bubka	Ukraine	–	–	–	–	–	o	–	o	–	x–	xx		5.80		8
3	Javier García	Spain	–	–	–	o	o	xo	xo	xxx					5.70		7
4	Jean Galfione	France	–	–	–	xo	–	xo	xxx						5.60		6
5	Tim Lobinger	Germany	o	o	o	o	xxo	xxx							5.50		5
6	Andrea Pegoraro	Italy	–	o	–	o	xxx								5.40		4
7	Neil Winter	Great Britain	xo	xo	xxo	xxx									5.30		3
8	Miroslaw Chmara	Poland	–	xxo	–	xxx									5.20		2
9	František Jansa	Czech Republic	xxo	xxo	xxx										5.20		1

=== Long jump ===
26 June

Rank	Name	Nationality	#1	#2	#3	#4	#5	#6	Result	Notes	Points
1	Giovanni Evangelisti	Italy	7.94	x	x	x	x	8.04w	8.04w		9
2	Ángel Hernández	Spain	7.53	8.04w	x	x	x	x	8.04w		8
3	Stanislav Tarasenko	Russia	7.93	x	x	x	7.66	x	7.93		7
4	Konstantin Krause	Germany	x	7.69	7.19	7.92w	7.73	7.71	7.92w		6
5	Serge Hélan	France	x	x	x	x	7.79	x	7.79		4
6	Milan Gombala	Czech Republic	7.52	x	x	7.70	7.68	7.68	7.70		4
7	Fred Salle	Great Britain	7.63	x	7.54w	x	7.59	7.59	7.63		3
8	Roman Golanowski	Poland	7.25	7.60w	x	x	x	x	7.60w		2
9	Yevgeniy Semenyuk	Ukraine	7.28	7.33	7.10	7.50	x	7.54	7.54		1

=== Triple jump ===
27 June

Rank	Name	Nationality	#1	#2	#3	#4	#5	#6	Result	Notes	Points
1	Pierre Camara	France	17.08w	17.15	15.47	x	17.46w	–	17.46w		9
2	Jonathan Edwards	Great Britain	17.27	16.81	x	x	17.08	16.87	17.27		8
3	Ralf Jaros	Germany	x	x	17.18	x	x	16.83	17.18		7
4	Vasiliy Sokov	Russia	15.86	16.59	16.76	16.66	x	17.06	17.06		6
5	Mykola Musiyenko	Ukraine	16.81w	15.34	15.50	16.37	16.63	16.43	16.81w		5
6	Jacek Butkiewicz	Poland	x	15.42	x	x	x	16.50w	16.50w		4
7	Milan Mikuláš	Czech Republic	x	16.33	x	x	x	16.16	16.33		3
8	Julio López	Spain	x	x	15.79	x	15.89	x	15.89		2
9	Daniele Buttiglione	Italy	x	x	x	x	15.84	15.78w	15.84		1

=== Shot put ===
26 June

Rank	Name	Nationality	#1	#2	#3	#4	#5	#6	Result	Notes	Points
1	Oleksandr Bagach	Ukraine	19.70	20.03	19.83	x	x	20.15	20.15		9
2	Paolo Dal Soglio	Italy	x	18.62	x	19.50	x	19.79	19.79		8
3	Yevgeniy Palchikov	Russia	18.46	18.73	x	19.29	19.30	19.64	19.64		7
4	Oliver-Sven Buder	Germany	19.17	x	19.20	19.30	19.23	19.23	19.30		6
5	Helmut Krieger	Poland	17.54	18.41	18.21	x	x	x	18.41		5
6	Paul Edwards	Great Britain	x	18.33	18.13	x	18.09	17.78	18.33		4
7	Manuel Martínez	Spain	17.65	17.39	17.97	18.16	x	17.91	18.16		3
8	Luc Viudès	France	17.92	17.94	17.93	17.91	17.92	17.86	17.94		2
9	Jan Bartl	Czechoslovakia	16.82	17.84	x	x	x	x	17.84		1

=== Discus throw ===
26 June

Rank	Name	Nationality	#1	#2	#3	#4	#5	#6	Result	Notes	Points
1	Lars Riedel	Germany	63.90	64.26	66.30	64.14	63.90	65.30	66.30		9
2	Dmitriy Shevchenko	Russia	62.66	63.96	x	60.26	x	63.64	63.96		8
3	Volodymyr Zinchenko	Ukraine	61.18	59.24	62.42	x	59.06	61.74	62.42		7
4	Luciano Zerbini	Italy	59.50	59.90	60.52	58.56	x	61.10	61.10		6
5	Imrich Bugár	Czech Republic	58.28	58.66	x	57.16	57.02	56.68	58.66		5
6	Robert Weir	Great Britain	56.82	57.42	55.60	55.74	x	56.30	57.42		4
7	Marek Majkrzak	Poland	54.34	x	55.50	x	54.20	x	55.50		3
8	Jean Pons	France	53.52	52.58	54.00	53.38	x	54.72	54.72		2
9	Abraham Delgado	Spain	x	x	x	48.98	x	49.84	49.84		1

=== Hammer throw ===
27 June

Rank	Name	Nationality	#1	#2	#3	#4	#5	#6	Result	Notes	Points
1	Sergey Litvinov	Russia	80.48	x	80.78	79.88	79.98	79.62	80.78		9
2	Christophe Épalle	France	74.84	75.80	75.64	76.08	75.62	x	76.08		8
3	Andriy Skvaruk	Ukraine	74.22	74.18	76.00	74.60	x	74.60	76.00		7
4	Enrico Sgrulletti	Italy	x	74.86	72.52	x	74.56	x	74.86		6
5	Paul Head	Great Britain	71.46	70.50	71.46	71.10	71.90	70.52	71.90		5
6	Lech Kowalski	Poland	x	67.62	68.18	x	71.30	68.80	71.30		4
7	Karsten Kobs	Germany	x	68.94	x	68.96	65.80	70.66	70.66		3
8	Pavel Sedlácek	Czech Republic	68.12	69.28	x	x	70.06	x	70.06		2
9	Alex Marfull	Spain	64.14	x	63.90	64.24	62.06	x	64.24		1

=== Javelin throw ===
27 June

Rank	Name	Nationality	#1	#2	#3	#4	#5	#6	Result	Notes	Points
1	Jan Železný	Czech Republic	89.54	89.74	89.84				89.84		9
2	Mick Hill	Great Britain	78.88	x	78.24	80.76	77.76	78.84	80.76		8
3	Andrey Shevchuk	Russia	75.68	78.86	78.68	79.16	77.52	x	79.16		7
4	Raymond Hecht	Germany	78.86	77.50	76.58	72.68	71.50	74.36	78.86		6
5	Fabio De Gaspari	Italy	74.60	75.96	71.80	73.82	71.28	72.92	75.96		5
6	Andriy Novikov	Ukraine	69.98	71.94	69.02	71.50	71.52	75.70	75.70		4
7	Rajmund Kólko	Poland	74.52	68.86	x	68.90	68.62	71.72	74.52		3
8	Alain Storaci	France	67.92	70.22	x	70.18	72.24	72.08	72.24		2
9	Raimundo Fernández	Spain	61.02	68.06	x	66.34	62.78	65.32	68.06		1

== Women's results ==
=== 100 metres ===
26 June
Wind: -0.3 m/s

Rank	Name	Nationality	Time	Notes	Points
1	Irina Privalova	Russia	11.08		9
2	Marie-José Pérec	France	11.27		8
3	Zhanna Tarnopolskaya	Ukraine	11.29		7
4	Melanie Paschke	Germany	11.50		6
5	Beverly Kinch	Great Britain	11.50		5
6	Sanna Hernesniemi	Finland	11.53		4
7	Dorota Krawczak	Poland	11.81		3
8	Lia Elena Murgu	Romania	11.85		2
9	Sonia Vigati	Italy	11.88		1

=== 200 metres ===
27 June
Wind: +0.8 m/s

Rank	Name	Nationality	Time	Notes	Points
1	Irina Privalova	Russia	22.30		9
2	Marie-José Pérec	France	22.30		8
3	Silke Knoll	Germany	22.89		7
4	Zhanna Tarnopolskaya	Ukraine	22.96		6
5	Sanna Hernesniemi	Finland	23.01		5
6	Katharine Merry	Great Britain	23.27		4
7	Ionela Târlea	Romania	23.80		3
8	Daniela Ferrian	Italy	24.09		2
9	Katarzyna Zakrzewska	Poland	24.18		1

=== 400 metres ===
26 June

Rank	Name	Nationality	Time	Notes	Points
1	Yelena Ruzina	Russia	51.54		9
2	Elsa Devassoigne	France	51.92		8
3	Linda Keough	Great Britain	52.14		7
4	Mariana Florea	Romania	52.24		6
5	Anja Rücker	Germany	52.36		5
6	Lyudmyla Dzhyhalova	Ukraine	52.60		4
7	Elzbieta Kilinska	Poland	53.15		3
8	Francesca Carbone	Italy	52.23		2
9	Aila Haikkonen	Finland	53.73		1

=== 800 metres ===
26 June

Rank	Name	Nationality	Time	Notes	Points
1	Ella Kovacs	Romania	1:57.5		9
2	Lyubov Kremlyova	Russia	1:59.8		8
3	Yelena Storchovaya	Ukraine	2:00.1		7
4	Fabia Trabaldo	Italy	2:00.1		6
5	Diane Modahl	Great Britain	2:00.2		5
6	Patricia Djaté	France	2:01.2		4
7	Malgorzata Rydz	Poland	2:01.5		3
8	Christine Wachtel	Germany	2:02.2		2
	Satu Jääskeläinen	Finland	?		0

=== 1500 metres ===
27 June

Rank	Name	Nationality	Time	Notes	Points
1	Vera Chuvashova	Russia	4:16.03		9
2	Violeta Beclea	Romania	4:16.36		8
3	Yvonne Murray	Great Britain	4:17.51		7
4	Malgorzata Rydz	Poland	4:17.84		6
5	Svetlana Miroshnik	Ukraine	4:18.24		5
6	Frédérique Quentin	France	4:19.41		4
7	Monika Ronnholm	Finland	4:19.58		3
8	Simona Weidner	Germany	4:19.91		2
9	Valentina Tauceri	Italy	4:20.40		1

=== 3000 metres ===
26 June

Rank	Name	Nationality	Time	Notes	Points
1	Margareta Keszeg	Romania	8:51.88		9
2	Yelena Kopytova	Russia	8:52.27		8
3	Alison Wyeth	Great Britain	8:52.98		7
4	Roberta Brunet	Italy	8:54.16		6
5	Annemari Sandell	Finland	8:55.46		5
6	Anna Brzezinska	Poland	8:55.52		4
7	Farida Fatès	France	8:56.09		3
8	Christina Mai	Germany	9:00.24		2
9	Zoya Kaznovskaya	Ukraine	9:01.86		1

=== 10,000 metres ===
27 June

Rank	Name	Nationality	Time	Notes	Points
1	Viktoriya Nenasheva	Russia	32:33.46		9
2	Iulia Negura	Romania	32:36.05		8
3	Tamara Koba	Ukraine	32:39.50		7
4	Suzanne Rigg	Great Britain	32:44.06		6
5	Rosanna Munerotto	Italy	32:48.36		5
6	Claudia Metzner	Germany	33:03.18		4
7	Rosario Murcia	France	33:28.53		3
8	Ritva Lemettinen	Finland	34:35.15		2
9	Aniela Nikiel	Poland	35:35.11		1

=== 100 metres hurdles ===
27 June
Wind: +0.3 m/s

Rank	Name	Nationality	Time	Notes	Points
1	Marina Azyabina	Russia	12.63		9
2	Jacqui Agyepong	Great Britain	13.17		8
3	Liliana Nastase	Romania	13.22		7
4	Cecile Cinelu	France	13.22		6
5	Yelena Politika	Ukraine	13.23		5
6	Carla Tuzzi	Italy	13.29		4
7	Kristin Patzwahl	Germany	13.32		3
8	Dorota Krawczak	Poland	13.75		2
9	Iina Pekkola	Finland	14.07		1

=== 400 metres hurdles ===
26 June

Rank	Name	Nationality	Time	Notes	Points
1	Sally Gunnell	Great Britain	53.73	CR	9
2	Anna Knoroz	Russia	54.42		8
3	Nicoleta Caru?a?u	Romania	54.94		7
4	Silvia Rieger	Germany	55.04		6
5	Monika Warnicka	Poland	55.82		5
6	Inna Neplyuyeva	Ukraine	58.20		4
7	Carole Nelson	France	58.58		3
8	Maria Luisa Cilimbini	Italy	58.66		2
9	Marjut Toyli	Finland	58.83		1

=== 4 × 100 metres relay ===
26 June

Rank	Nation	Athletes	Time	Note	Points
1	Russia	Olga Bogoslovskaya, Natalya Voronova, Marina Trandenkova, Irina Privalova	42.79		9
2	France	Patricia Girard, Odiah Sidibé, Maguy Nestoret, Marie-José Pérec	43.01		8
3	Germany	Andrea Philipp, Silke Knoll, Bettina Zipp, Melanie Paschke	43.46		7
4	Ukraine	Anzhelika Shevchuk, Antonina Slyusar, Irina Slyusar, Zhanna Tarnopolskaya	43.90		6
5	Finland	Anu Pirttimaa, Sisko Hanhijoki, Sanna Hernesniemi, Marja Salmela	44.20		5
6	Great Britain	Paula Thomas, Beverly Kinch, Katharine Merry, Marcia Richardson	44.53		4
7	Poland	Izabela Czajko, Katarzyna Zakrzewska, Monika Borejza, Dorota Krawczak	44.73		3
8	Italy	Annarita Balzani, Giada Gallina, Daniela Ferrian, Rossella Tarolo	44.83		2
	Romania	Lia Elena Murgu, Liliana Nastase, Ionela Târlea, Marieta Ilcu	DNF		0

=== 4 × 400 metres relay ===
27 June

Rank	Nation	Athletes	Time	Note	Points
1	Russia	Yelena Golesheva, Yelena Ruzina, Vera Sychugova, Tatyana Alekseyeva	3:24.23	NR	9
2	Ukraine	Lyudmila Kashchey, Aelita Yurchenko, Yelena Nasonkina, Lyudmyla Dzhyhalova	3:27.37		8
3	Germany	Karin Janke, Anja Rücker, Jana Schönenberger, Sandra Seuser	3:27.80		7
4	France	Francine Landre, Evelyne Elien, Marie-Louise Bévis, Elsa Devassoigne	3:28.41		6
5	Great Britain	Linda Keough, Diane Modahl, Jennifer Stoute, Sally Gunnell	3:28.55		5
6	Romania	Ionela Târlea, Ella Kovacs, Nicoleta Caru?a?u, Mariana Florea	3:29.28		4
7	Poland	Monika Warnicka, Sylwia Pachut, Barbara Grzywocz, Elzbieta Kilinska	3:33.59		3
8	Italy	Francesca Carbone, Patrizia Spuri, Giuseppina Perlino, Elena Zamperioli	3:33.91		2
9	Finland	Aila Haikkonen, Heidi Suomi, Satu Jääskeläinen, Sonja Finell	3:39.17		1

=== High jump ===
27 June

Rank	Name	Nationality	1.70	1.75	1.80	1.85	1.88	1.90	1.92	1.94	1.96	1.98	2.00	Result	Notes	Points
1	Alina Astafei	Romania	–	–	–	xo	–	o	–	o	o	o	xo	2.00	NR	9
2	Heike Henkel	Germany	–	–	–	–	–	o	–	xo	o	x–	xx	1.96		8
3	Katarzyna Majchrzak	Poland	–	–	o	o	o	xo	xxo	xxx				1.92		7
4	Inha Babakova	Ukraine	–	–	o	o	o	o	xxx					1.90		5.5
4	Antonella Bevilacqua	Italy	–	o	o	o	o	o	xxx					1.90		5.5
6	Joanne Jennings	Great Britain	–	o	o	xo	o	o	xxx					1.90		4
7	Yevgeniya Zhdanova	Russia	–	–	o	o	xo	xxx						1.88		3
8	Kaisa Gustafsson	Finland	o	o	xo	xxo	xxx							1.85		2
9	Nathalie Lefebvre	France	o	o	o	xxx								1.80		1

=== Long jump ===
27 June

Rank	Name	Nationality	#1	#2	#3	#4	#5	#6	Result	Notes	Points
1	Heike Drechsler	Germany	6.89	5.35	6.91	6.75	6.87	7.02	7.02		9
2	Yelena Sinchukova	Russia	x	6.94w	x	6.85	x	x	6.94w		8
3	Fiona May	United Kingdom	6.60	6.55	6.67	6.73	6.29	6.33	6.73		7
4	Valentina Uccheddu	Italy	6.70w	6.46	6.58	–	–	6.47	6.70w		6
5	Larysa Berezhna	Ukraine	x	6.60	x	x	6.57	x	6.60		5
6	Marieta Ilcu	Romania	6.48	6.44	6.48	x	6.50w	x	6.50w		4
7	Agata Karczmarek	Poland	6.36	x	6.31	x	x	6.45w	6.45w		3
8	Nadine Caster	France	x	6.32w	x	x	6.10	6.20	6.32w		2
9	Marika Salminen	Finland	6.08	6.22	x	x	x	x	6.22		1

=== Triple jump ===
26 June

Rank	Name	Nationality	#1	#2	#3	#4	#5	#6	Result	Notes	Points
1	Yolanda Chen	Russia	x	x	14.00	x	14.34w	13.75	14.34		9
2	Helga Radtke	Germany	13.75	13.70	12.93	x	x	14.05	14.05		8
3	Inessa Kravets	Ukraine	13.99	13.76	13.76	13.48	13.82	x	13.99		7
4	Michelle Griffith	Great Britain	x	13.54	x	x	13.04	x	13.54		6
5	Monica Toth	Romania	x	13.46w	13.45	13.46w	x	13.39	13.46w		5
6	Agnieszka Stanczyk	Poland	x	x	12.82	13.34	x	12.73	13.34		4
7	Loredana Rossi	Italy	13.03	13.02	x	12.89	13.02w	13.18	13.18		3
8	Marika Salminen	Finland	x	x	13.18	x	x	12.94	13.18		2
9	Sylvie Borda	France	12.81	12.77	13.15	13.15	12.82	12.80	13.15		1

=== Shot put ===
26 June

Rank	Name	Nationality	#1	#2	#3	#4	#5	#6	Result	Notes	Points
1	Anna Romanova	Russia	18.53	18.67	18.32	x	19.17	19.43	19.43		9
2	Valentina Fedyushina	Ukraine	17.83	18.79	x	x	x	18.91	18.91		8
3	Stephanie Storp	Germany	18.85	x	x	18.56	x	18.69	18.85		7
4	Mihaela Oana	Romania	17.59	18.20	18.35	x	17.98	x	18.35		6
5	Krystyna Danilczyk	Poland	17.78	17.69	17.63	x	17.43	18.04	18.04		5
6	Marika Tuliniemi	Finland	16.44	16.72	x	17.26	16.66	16.72	17.26		4
7	Agnese Maffeis	Italy	x	16.46	x	16.89	x	x	16.89		3
8	Myrtle Augee	United Kingdom	16.86	16.85	x	x	16.55	16.58	16.86		2
9	Nathalie Bellotti	France	14.68	14.71	x	x	14.36	x	14.71		1

=== Discus throw ===
27 June

Rank	Name	Nationality	#1	#2	#3	#4	#5	#6	Result	Notes	Points
1	Larisa Korotkevich	Russia	61.84	x	60.58	64.28	61.96	64.58	64.58		9
2	Larisa Mikhalchenko	Ukraine	x	63.04	57.50	59.50	x	x	63.04		8
3	Renata Katewicz	Poland	59.00	55.30	58.76	61.68	58.88	59.76	61.68		7
4	Manuela Tîrneci	Romania	x	56.38	57.86	61.48	56.86	56.28	61.48		6
5	Jana Lauren	Germany	58.10	58.48	58.06	x	57.92	57.60	58.48		5
6	Agnese Maffeis	Italy	56.02	56.84	x	x	55.30	55.08	56.84		4
7	Isabelle Devaluez	France	x	50.36	56.62	54.06	x	x	56.62		3
8	Jackie McKernan	Great Britain	53.74	x	53.84	53.64	53.88	51.36	53.88		2
9	Kirsi Lindfors	Finland	49.70	x	x	x	x	x	49.70		1

=== Javelin throw ===
26 June – Old model

Rank	Name	Nationality	#1	#2	#3	#4	#5	#6	Result	Notes	Points
1	Felicia Țilea	Romania	58.66	x	62.68	61.86	x	58.48	62.68		9
2	Karen Forkel	Germany	55.84	57.00	55.36	61.92	57.48	x	61.92		8
3	Yekaterina Ivakina	Russia	58.28	x	61.74	58.42	x	x	61.74		7
4	Nathalie Teppe	France	58.70	51.44	x	x	x	50.74	58.70		6
5	Paivi Alafrantti	Finland	x	55.98	56.36	x	56.26	56.40	56.40		5
6	Irina Kostyuchenkova	Ukraine	56.28	x	x	53.22	54.04	55.38	56.28		4
7	Sharon Gibson	Great Britain	54.68	53.40	53.98	55.24	52.44	52.16	55.24		3
8	Genowefa Patla	Poland	51.52	55.16	55.22	53.46	x	x	55.22		2
9	Claudia Coslovich	Italy	x	x	46.24	48.22	45.76	50.06	50.06		1
