= Athletics at the 1973 Summer Universiade – Women's discus throw =

The women's discus throw event at the 1973 Summer Universiade was held at the Central Lenin Stadium in Moscow on 16 and 17 August.

== Medalists ==
Gold	Silver	Bronze
Faina Melnik; Soviet Union	Argentina Menis; Romania	Nadezhda Sergeyeva; Soviet Union

== Results ==
=== Qualification ===
Rank	Group	Athlete	Nationality	Result	Notes
?	?	Faina Melnik	Soviet Union	66.08	
?	?	Argentina Menis	Romania	61.30	
?	?	Nadezhda Sergeyeva	Soviet Union	57.02	
?	?	Krystyna Nadolna	Poland	55.22	
?	?	Mariya Vergova	Bulgaria	54.84	
?	?	Anneliese Braun	East Germany	53.40	
?	?	Carol Martin	Canada	50.06	
?	?	Marie Novotná	Czechoslovakia	47.90	
?	?	Meg Ritchie	Great Britain	44.70	
?	?	Christine Barck	Finland	44.20	
?	?	Catherine Bazin	France	43.10	
13	?	Monette Driscoll	United States	42.76	
14	?	Lynnette Matthews	United States	41.24	
15	?	Ansuya Venkateshulu-Bai	India	39.46	

=== Final ===
Rank	Athlete	Nationality	Result	Notes
1st place, gold medalist(s)	Faina Melnik	Soviet Union	64.54	
2nd place, silver medalist(s)	Argentina Menis	Romania	63.92	
3rd place, bronze medalist(s)	Nadezhda Sergeyeva	Soviet Union	59.26	
4	Mariya Vergova	Bulgaria	58.98	
5	Anneliese Braun	East Germany	57.74	
6	Krystyna Nadolna	Poland	55.44	
7	Carol Martin	Canada	52.26	
8	Marie Novotná	Czechoslovakia	49.26	
9	Catherine Bazin	France	47.16	
10	Renata Scaglia	Italy	46.78	
11	Meg Ritchie	Great Britain	45.42	
12	Christine Barck	Finland	43.08	
