= Blechacz =

Blechacz is a surname. Notable people with the surname include:

- Bernadetta Blechacz (born 1955), Polish javelin thrower
- Rafał Blechacz (born 1985), Polish classical pianist
