= Athletics at the 1975 Summer Universiade – Men's 400 metres hurdles =

The men's 400 metres hurdles event at the 1975 Summer Universiade was held at the Stadio Olimpico in Rome on 19 and 20 September.

== Medalists ==
Gold	Silver	Bronze
Rolf Ziegler; West Germany	Jerzy Hewelt; Poland	Timo Ogunjimi; Nigeria

== Results ==
=== Heats ===
Rank	Heat	Athlete	Nationality	Time	Notes
1	1	Rolf Ziegler	West Germany	51.15	Q
2	1	Timo Ogunjimi	Nigeria	51.64	Q
3	1	Waldemar Szlendak	Poland	51.65	Q
4	2	Jerzy Hewelt	Poland	51.82	Q
5	2	Abdullatif Yusuf Hashem	Kuwait	51.92	Q
6	2	Hansjörg Haas	Switzerland	52.11	Q
7	2	David Jarvis	Canada	52.30	q
8	2	Franco Mazzetti	Italy	52.52	q
9	2	Enrique de la Mora	Mexico	52.97	
10	1	Lucien Baggio	France	53.07	
11	1	Santo Benedetto	Italy	53.41	
12	1	Enrique Aguirre	Mexico	53.75	

=== Final ===
Rank	Athlete	Nationality	Time	Notes
1st place, gold medalist(s)	Rolf Ziegler	West Germany	50.43	
2nd place, silver medalist(s)	Jerzy Hewelt	Poland	50.85	
3rd place, bronze medalist(s)	Timo Ogunjimi	Nigeria	51.25	
4	David Jarvis	Canada	51.29	
5	Waldemar Szlendak	Poland	51.38	
6	Hansjörg Haas	Switzerland	51.62	
7	Franco Mazzetti	Italy	52.53	
8	Abdullatif Yusuf Hashem	Kuwait	53.31	
