= Hydel =

Hydel may refer to:

- Hydroelectricity
- Mirosław Hydel (born 1963), Polish long jumper
- Hydel High School, in the Parish of St. Catherine, Jamaica
