= 1962 European Athletics Championships – Men's 1500 metres =

Men's 1500 metres at the 1962 European Athletics Championships
- Venue: JNA Stadium
- Location: Belgrade
- Dates: September 14 and 16, 1962

Medalists
| gold medal | Michel Jazy | France |
| silver medal | Witold Baran | Poland |
| bronze medal | Tomás Salinger | Czechoslovakia |

The men's 1500 metres at the 1962 European Athletics Championships was held in Belgrade, then Yugoslavia, at the JNA Stadium on September 14 and 16, 1962.

== Medalists ==
The medalists were:

- Gold—Michel Jazy France
- Silver—Witold Baran Poland
- Bronze—Tomás Salinger Czechoslovakia

== Results ==
=== Final ===
16 September

Results of the men's 1500m final by rank—sortable
| Rank | Name | Nationality | Time | Notes |
|---|---|---|---|---|
| 1st place, gold medalist(s) | Michel Jazy | France | 3:40.9 | |
| 2nd place, silver medalist(s) | Witold Baran | Poland | 3:42.1 | |
| 3rd place, bronze medalist(s) | Tomás Salinger | Czechoslovakia | 3:42.2 | |
| 4 | Heinz Böthling | West Germany | 3:42.7 | |
| 5 | Werner Krause | East Germany | 3:43.8 | |
| 6 | Vasiliy Savinkov | Soviet Union | 3:44.2 | |
| 7 | Henk Snepvangers | Netherlands | 3:44.8 | |
| 8 | Mike Berisford | Great Britain | 3:45.2 | |
| | Harald Norpoth | West Germany | DNF | |

=== Heats ===
14 September

==== Heat 1 ====
Heat 1 results, men's 1500m—sortable
| Rank | Name | Nationality | Time | Notes |
|---|---|---|---|---|
| 1 | Heinz Böthling | West Germany | 3:47.4 | Q |
| 2 | Henk Snepvangers | Netherlands | 3:47.5 | Q |
| 3 | Mike Berisford | Great Britain | 3:47.6 | Q |
| 4 | Ivan Belitskiy | Soviet Union | 3:48.3 | |
| 5 | Manuel de Oliveira | Portugal | 3:48.8 | NR |
| 6 | Georgios Mesimertzis | Greece | 3:51.8 | |

==== Heat 2 ====
Heat 2 results, men's 1500m—sortable
| Rank | Name | Nationality | Time | Notes |
|---|---|---|---|---|
| 1 | Witold Baran | Poland | 3:44.1 | Q |
| 2 | Vasiliy Savinkov | Soviet Union | 3:44.4 | Q |
| 3 | Werner Krause | East Germany | 3:44.8 | Q |
| 4 | Simo Važić | Yugoslavia | 3:45.5 | |
| 5 | György Kiss | Hungary | 3:45.7 | |
| 6 | Jean Clausse | France | 3:46.4 | |
| 7 | Muharrem Dalkılıç | Turkey | 3:46.8 | |
| 8 | William Cornell | Great Britain | 3:49.9 | |
| 9 | Hugo Walser | Liechtenstein | 4:01.8 | |

==== Heat 3 ====
Heat 3 results, men's 1500m—sortable
| Rank | Name | Nationality | Time | Notes |
|---|---|---|---|---|
| 1 | Michel Jazy | France | 3:47.7 | Q |
| 2 | Harald Norpoth | West Germany | 3:48.0 | Q |
| 3 | Tomás Salinger | Czechoslovakia | 3:48.0 | Q |
| 4 | Peter Parsch | Hungary | 3:48.4 | |
| 5 | Stan Taylor | Great Britain | 3:49.9 | |
| 6 | Rudolf Klaban | Austria | 3:50.0 | |
| 7 | Tomás Barris | Spain | 3:50.0 | |
| 8 | Alfredo Rizzo | Italy | 4:00.3 | |

== Participation ==
According to an unofficial count, 23 athletes from 17 countries took part in the event.

- Austria (1)
- Czechoslovakia (1)
- East Germany (1)
- France (2)
- Greece (1)
- Hungary (2)
- Italy (1)
- Liechtenstein (1)
- Netherlands (1)
- Poland (1)
- Portugal (1)
- Soviet Union (2)
- Spain (1)
- Turkey (1)
- Great Britain (3)
- West Germany (2)
- Yugoslavia (1)
