= Witold Baran =

Polish middle-distance runner (1939–2020)

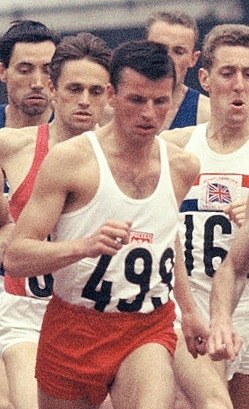
- Baran at the 1964 Olympics

Personal information
- Nationality: Polish
- Born: 29 July 1939 Chmielów, Poland
- Died: 22 June 2020 in (aged 80) Bydgoszcz, Poland
- Height: 178 cm (5 ft 10 in)
- Weight: 70 kg (154 lb)

Sport
- Sport: Athletics
- Event: long-distance
- Club: Zawisza Bydgoszcz
Medal record
Men's athletics
Representing Poland
European Championships
Silver medal – second place	1962 Belgrade	1500 m

Witold Stanisław Baran (29 July 1939 – 22 June 2020) was a middle distance runner from Poland. He was born in Chmielów. Set a European mile record of 3 minutes 56.04 sec finishing first at the White City, London on 3 August 1964. He finished sixth in the 1500 metres final at the 1964 Summer Olympics in Tokyo, Japan.

Bran finished second behind fellow Pole Lech Boguszewicz in the 3 miles event at the British 1964 AAA Championships.

== International competitions ==
Year	Competition	Venue	Position	Event	Notes
Representing Poland
1959	World Festival of Youth and Students	Vienna, Austria	2nd	1500 m	3:51.1
1962	World Festival of Youth and Students	Helsinki, Finland	1st	1500 m	3:43.6
1962	European Championships	Belgrade, Yugoslavia	2nd	1500 m	3:42.1
1964	Olympic Games	Tokyo, Japan	6th	1500 m	3:40.3
1965	European Cup Final	Stuttgart, West Germany	2nd	5000 m	14:20.0

== Personal bests ==
- 800 metres – 1:48.1h (Warsaw 1966)
- 1000 metres – 2:21.2h (Bydgoszcz 1962)
- 1500 metres – 3:38.9h (Tokyo 1964)
- Mile – 3:56.04 (London 1964)
- 3000 metres – 7:55.4h (Bydgoszcz 1963)
- 5000 metres – 13:41.6h (Paris 1969)
