= Grażyna Syrek =

Polish long-distance runner

Personal information
- Nationality: Polish
- Born: 9 January 1972 (age 54)

Sport
- Sport: Long-distance running
- Event: Marathon

Grażyna Syrek (born 9 January 1972) is a Polish long-distance runner. She competed in the women's marathon at the 2004 Summer Olympics.
