= Michał Bartoszak =

Polish long-distance runner

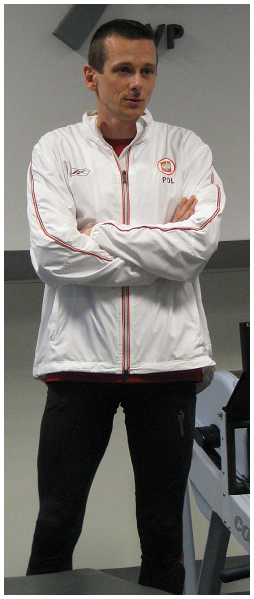
- Michał Bartoszak in 2010

Personal information
- Born: 21 June 1970 Szamotuły, Poland
- Height: 1.80 m (5 ft 11 in)
- Weight: 67 kg (148 lb)

Sport
- Sport: Athletics
- Events: Middle-distance, marathon
- Club: UKS Biegus Wręczyca

Michał Bartoszak (born 21 June 1970 in Szamotuły) is a former Polish long-distance runner. Bartoszak holds the Polish indoor record in the one mile, outdoor record for 2000 m, and was a national champion in the 1,500 metres. He won the 2003 California International Marathon and competed in the marathon at the 2004 Summer Olympics.

== International competitions ==
| Year | Competition | Venue | Position | Event | Notes |
Representing Poland
| 1989 | European Junior Championships | Varaždin, Yugoslavia | 4th | 5000 m | 14:11.65 |
| 1993 | World Championships | Stuttgart, Germany | 24th (h) | 5000 m | 13:52.95 |
| 1994 | European Championships | Helsinki, Finland | 9th (h) | 1500 m | 3:43.96 |
| 1995 | World Championships | Gothenburg, Sweden | 15th (sf) | 3000 m s'chase | 8:29.14 |
| 1997 | World Championships | Athens, Greece | 32nd (h) | 3000 m s'chase | 8:47.01 |
| 1998 | European Championships | Budapest, Hungary | 22nd (h) | 3000 m s'chase | 8:45.70 |
| 2003 | California International Marathon | California State Capitol, United States | 1st | Marathon | 2:16:21 |
| 2004 | Olympic Games | Athens, Greece | 37th | Marathon | 2:20:20 |

== Personal bests ==
Outdoor

- 1500 metres – 3:38.21 (New Delhi 1991)
- One mile – 3:58.96 (Nuoro 1993)
- 2000 metres – 5:01.7 (Turin 1991)
- 3000 metres – 7:47.54 (Sopot 1996)
- 5000 metres – 13:29.72 (Victoria 1992)
- 10,000 metres – 28:57.26 (Szczecin 2002)
- 3000 metres steeplechase – 8:22.84 (Hengelo 1996)
- 5 kilometres – 13:39 (Los Angeles 1993)
- 10 kilometres – 28:27 (Wręczyca Wielka 2002)
- 10 miles – 48:19 (Borgholzhausen 2000)
- Half marathon – 1:03:35 (Altötting 1999)
- Marathon – 2:12:21 (Chicago 1999)

Indoor

- 1500 metres – 3:43.96 (Paris 1994)
- One mile – 3:58.39 (Fairfax 1994)
