= Jan Zakrzewski (runner) =

Polish long-distance runner

Personal information
- Born: 21 December 1970 (age 55) Gubin, Poland
- Height: 1.87 m (6 ft 2 in)
- Weight: 70 kg (150 lb)

Sport
- Country: Poland
- Club: Oleśniczanka Oleśnica

Achievements and titles
- World finals: —
- Personal best(s): 3000 metres: 7:59.28; 10000 metres: 29:09.41; 3000 m steeplechase: 8:22.49 marathon: 2:18:13
- Updated on 2008-01-06

Jan Zakrzewski (born 21 December 1970 in Gubin, Poland) is a long-distance and steeplechase runner. He was an Olympian at the 2004 Summer Olympics in Athens, Greece where he competed in 3000 metre steeplechase. Zakrzewski won a national championship in 3000 metres steeplechase (1991, 2001, 2004), 10000 metres (2004) and in cross country running (1996). Currently member of Oleśniczanka Oleśnica team.
