= Joanna Smolarek =

Polish sprinter

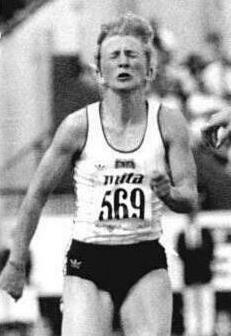
- Smolarek in 1989
- Born: November 26, 1965 (age 59); Katowice, Poland

Joanna Smolarek (born 26 November 1965) is a Polish former track and field sprinter who represented the country at the 1988 Summer Olympics in Seoul. She set her personal best (11.35s) in the women's 100 metres event in 1988.
