= Dariusz Trafas =

Polish javelin thrower

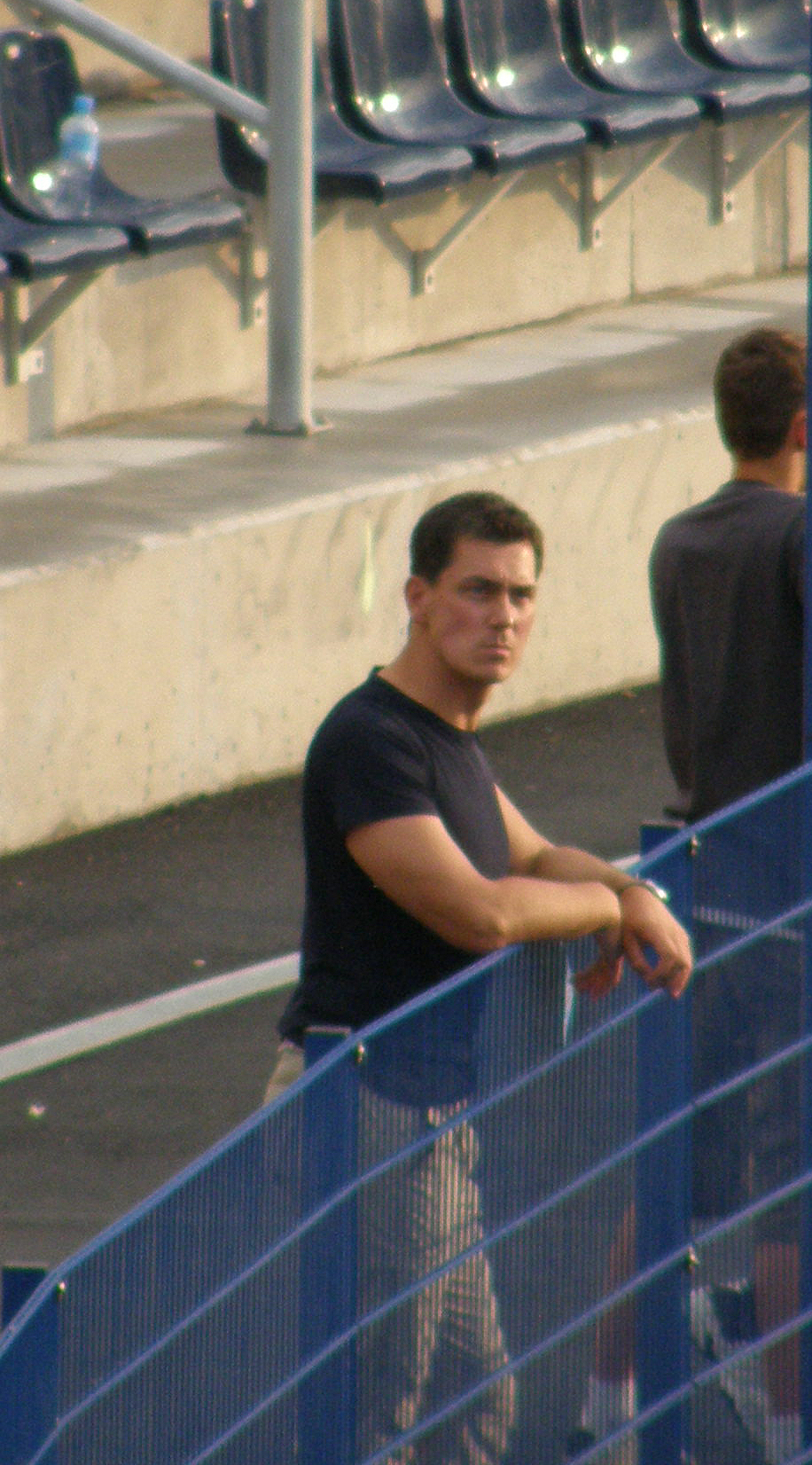

Medal record

Representing Poland

Men's athletics

World Junior Championships
Silver medal – second place	1990 Plovidv	Javelin Throw

Dariusz Trafas (born 16 May 1972 in Kolobrzeg) is a former Polish javelin thrower.

He won the silver medal at the 1990 World Junior Championships, finished tenth at the 2000 Summer Olympics and seventh at the 2002 European Championships. He competed at the World Championships in 1999 and 2001 without reaching the final.

His personal best was 87.17 metres, achieved in September 2000 in Runaway Bay.

He was coached by former world record holder Uwe Hohn.

== Seasonal bests by year ==
- 1998 - 81.90
- 1999 - 83.23
- 2000 - 87.17
- 2001 - 85.78
- 2002 - 86.77
- 2003 - 81.98
- 2004 - 80.78
- 2005 - 77.55
- 2006 - 77.57

== Competition record ==
Year	Competition	Venue	Position	Notes
Representing Poland
1990	World Junior Championships	Plovdiv, Bulgaria	2nd	72.76 m
1998	European Championships	Budapest, Hungary	11th	79.79 m
1999	World Championships	Seville, Spain	18th (q)	78.43 m
2000	Olympic Games	Sydney, Australia	10th	82.30 m
2001	World Championships	Edmonton, Canada	16th (q)	81.38 m
2002	European Championships	Munich, Germany	7th	80.37 m

== See also ==
- Polish records in athletics
