= Kazimierz Maranda =

Polish middle-distance runner

Personal information
- Nationality: Polish
- Born: 23 February 1947 (age 79) Burzenin, Poland

Sport
- Sport: Middle-distance running
- Event: Steeplechase
Medal record
Representing Poland
Summer Universiade
Bronze medal – third place	1975 Rome	3000m steeplechase

Kazimierz Maranda (born 23 February 1947) is a Polish middle-distance runner. He ran in the men's 3000 metres steeplechase at the 1972 Summer Olympics. He won five national titles, set three national records and won bronze medals at the European Championships, European Junior Championships, and Universiade.
