= Liliana Zagacka =

Polish triple jumper

Liliana Zagacka (born 28 January 1977 in Góra Śląska) is a Polish triple jumper.

She finished ninth in long jump at the 2002 European Championships. She also competed at the 2001 World Championships and the 2004 Olympic Games without reaching the finals.

Her personal best jump is 14.22 metres, achieved in July 2001 in Biała Podlaska. This was the Polish record until 2010.

== Competition record ==
| Year | Competition | Venue | Position | Event | Notes |
Representing Poland
| 1996 | World Junior Championships | Sydney, Australia | 7th | Triple jump | 13.15 m (wind: +1.1 m/s) |
| 1997 | European U23 Championships | Turku, Finland | 12th | Triple jump | 13.18 m (wind: +1.7 m/s) |
| 2001 | World Championships | Edmonton, Canada | 19th (q) | Triple jump | 13.65 m |
| 2002 | European Championships | Munich, Germany | 9th | Long jump | 6.24 m |
| 2002 | European Championships | Munich, Germany | 18th (q) | Triple jump | 13.69 m |
| 2004 | Olympic Games | Athens, Greece | 29th (q) | Triple jump | 13.59 m |
