= Zbigniew Pierzynka =

Polish long-distance runner

Personal information
- Born: October 21, 1951 (age 74) Kraków, Małopolskie, Poland

Sport
- Sport: Marathon running

Zbigniew Pierzynka (born October 21, 1951) is a former long-distance runner from Poland, who represented his native country at the 1980 Summer Olympics in Moscow, USSR. He set his personal best (2:12:21) in the classic distance in 1986.

== Achievements ==
Year	Competition	Venue	Position	Event	Notes
Representing Poland
1980	Olympic Games	Moscow, Soviet Union	26th	Marathon	2:20:03
1982	Warsaw Marathon	Warsaw, Poland	1st	Marathon	2:24:09
