= Magdalena Szczepańska =

Polish heptathlete (born 1980)

Personal information
- Full name: Magdalena Szczepańska
- Nationality: Poland
- Born: 25 January 1980 (age 46) Zielona Góra, Poland
- Height: 1.78 m (5 ft 10 in)
- Weight: 62 kg (137 lb)

Sport
- Sport: Athletics
- Event: Heptathlon
- Club: AZS AWFiS Gdańsk
- Coached by: Jerzy Skucha (national)

Achievements and titles
- Personal best(s): Heptathlon: 6115 points (2004)

Magdalena Szczepańska (born 25 January 1980 in Zielona Góra) is a retired Polish heptathlete. She won a silver medal at the 2004 European Combined Events Cup in Hengelo, Netherlands, and then represented her nation Poland in heptathlon at the Olympics in Athens a few months later, finishing in twenty-first place. Szczepańska trained under the tutelage of head coach Jerzy Skucha for the national team, while competing at AZS AWFiS Gdańsk.

Szczepańska qualified for the Polish squad in the women's heptathlon at the 2004 Summer Olympics in Athens. Two months before the Games, she eclipsed the IAAF Olympic "B" standard and her personal record of 6115 points to place second behind gold medalist Yuliya Ignatkina of Russia at the European Cup in Hengelo, Netherlands, resulting to her official selection to the Polish Olympic team in track and field. Szczepańska started the competition in a tie for second place with U.S. heptathlete Tiffany Lott-Hogan in the 100 metres hurdles to command the medal position, but a below-par performance in the high jump slipped her out of contention for the medal to the bottom of the leaderboard, achieving only 1.67 against leader Carolina Klüft's height by just twenty-four centimetres. Szczepańska could only manage to produce substantial events for the remaining events of the competition, until she finally landed herself to twenty-first place with a total score of 6012 points.

In September 2000, Szczepańska scored 6385 points at a women's decathlon in Lage, placing her among the top 70 performers all-time in the event as of 2025.
