= Dorota Gruca =

Polish long-distance runner

Dorota Gruca, married Giezek (born 5 December 1970 in Tarnogród) is a Polish marathon runner, who is a three-time national champion in the women's 5.000 metres.

She finished thirteenth at the 2005 World Championships, in a career best time of 2:27:46 hours. She also competed at the World Half Marathon Championships in 1995, 1996, 1998, 2000 and 2008

== Achievements ==
- All results regarding marathon, unless stated otherwise

Year	Competition	Venue	Position	Notes
Representing Poland
2005	Salt Lake City Marathon	Salt Lake City, United States	1st	2:30:07
2005	World Championships	Helsinki, Finland	13th	2:27:46
2008	Olympic Games	Beijing, China	30th	2:33:32

== See also ==
- Polish records in athletics
