= Paweł Woźniak =

Polish hurdler

Personal information
- Born: March 5, 1969 (age 57) Zielona Góra, Lubuskie, Poland

Sport
- Sport: Track and field

Paweł Woźniak (born March 5, 1969) is a former hurdler from Poland, who represented his native country at the 1992 Summer Olympics in Barcelona. He set his personal best (49.96) in the men's 400m hurdles event in 1992.
