= Edward Szklarczyk =

Personal information
- Full name: Edward Ignacy Szklarczyk
- Nationality: Polish
- Born: 31 July 1941
- Died: 26 April 2013 (aged 71)

Sport
- Sport: Middle-distance running
- Event: Steeplechase

Edward Ignacy Szklarczyk (31 July 1941 – 26 April 2013) was a Polish middle-distance runner. He competed in the men's 3000 metres steeplechase at the 1964 Summer Olympics.
