= 1989 European Athletics Junior Championships =

- Level: Under 20
- Events: 41

The 1989 European Athletics Junior Championships was the tenth edition of the biennial athletics competition for European athletes aged under twenty. It was held in Varaždin, Yugoslavia (present-day Croatia) between 24 and 27 August.

== Men's results ==
Event	Gold		Silver		Bronze	
100 metres	Aleksandr Shlychkov (URS)	10.48	Marek Zalewski (POL)	10.52	Jason Livingston (GBR)	10.57
200 metres	Marek Zalewski (POL)	21.06	Aleksandr Shlychkov (URS)	21.37	Leif Jonsson (SWE)	21.41
400 metres	Wayne McDonald (GBR)	47.27	Jan Lenzke (GDR)	47.30	Dmitriy Golovastov (URS)	47.31
800 metres	Craig Winrow (GBR)	1:50.01	Paul Burgess (GBR)	1:50.18	Vaclav Hrich (TCH)	1:50.22
1500 metres	Michael Kluwe (FRG)	3:45.19	Marco Barbone (ITA)	3:45.23	Morgan Tollofsen (SWE)	3:45.34
5000 metres	Carsten Eich (GDR)	14:00.76	John Mayock (GBR)	14:11.05	Jon Dennis (GBR)	14:11.18
10,000 metres	Christian Leuprecht (ITA)	29:04.06	Laurent Saudrais (FRA)	29:07.99	Vincenzo Modica (ITA)	29:33.28
3000 m s'chase	Angelo Giardiello (ITA)	8:53.60	Spencer Duval (GBR)	8:54.68	Kim Bauermeister (FRG)	8:56.36
110 m hurdles	Antti Haapakoski (FIN)	14.03	Sébastien Thibault (FRA)	14.14	Dario Volturara (ITA)	14.28
400 m hurdles	Enzo Franciosi (ITA)	50.69	Vyachelsav Orinchuk (URS)	50.96	Radek Bartakovic (TCH)	51.16
10,000 m walk	Valentin Massana (ESP)	40:14.17	German Nieto (ESP)	40:37.47	Rashid Shafikov (URS)	40:38.47
20 km run	Dirk Nurnberger (GDR)	1 h 01:55	Dmitriy Solovyov (URS)	1 h 02:11	Giacomo Leone (ITA)	1 h 02:23
High jump	Mats Kollbrink (SWE)	2.26 m	Stevan Zorić (YUG)	2.22 m	Wolfgang Kreissig (FRG)	2.20 m
Pole vault	Maksim Tarasov (URS)	5.60 m	Igor Zaytsev (URS)	5.45 m	Olli-Pekka Mattila (FIN)	5.25 m
Long jump	Peter Oldin (SWE)	7.92 m	Wayne Griffith (GBR)	7.84 m	Rudi Vanlancker (BEL)	7.79 m
Triple jump	Denis Kapustin (URS)	16.63 m	Sergey Bykov (URS)	16.53 m	Mario Quintero (ESP)	16.18 m
Shot put	Aleksandr Klimenko (URS)	19.38 m	Dirk Preuss (GDR)	18.20 m	Matthew Simson (GBR)	18.11 m
Discus throw	Andreas Seelig (GDR)	59.10 m	Ion Oprea (ROM)	54.72 m	Gennadiy Pronko (URS)	54.22 m
Hammer throw	Sergey Kirmasov (URS)	72.68 m	Savvas Saritzoglou (GRE)	67.68 m	Igor Fyodorov (URS)	67.44 m
Javelin throw	Vladimir Ovchinnikov (URS)	76.96 m	Jarkko Kinnunen (FIN)	74.44 m	Andrey Shevchuk (URS)	73.04 m
4 × 100 m relay	Poland (POL); Piotr Cywiński; Sławomir Kusiowski; Marek Zalewski; Robert Maćkowiak	40.00	Great Britain (GBR); Steve Gookey; John Kenny; Wayne Griffith; Jason Livingston	40.11	Soviet Union (URS); Eduard Krasnov; Aleksandr Shlychkov; Viktor Ziabkin; Anvar Kuchmuradov	40.39
4 × 400 m relay	Soviet Union (URS); Aleksandr Angelov; Stanislav Gabydullin; Pyotr Zhelezniy; Dmitriy Golovastov	3:10.14	East Germany (GDR); Karsten Leuteritz; Gunnar Schmidt; Ralf Baxmann; Jan Lenzke	3:10.27	Bulgaria (BUL); Dian Ivanov; Dian Petkov; Dimitar Kolev; Konstantin Babalievski	3:11.10
Decathlon	Michael Kohnle (FRG)	8 114 pts	Norbert Lampe (GDR)	7 586 pts	David Bigham (GBR)	7 446 pts

== Women's results ==
Event	Gold		Silver		Bronze	
100 metres	Odiah Sidibé (FRA)	11.41	Zoya Taurin (URS)	11.48	Manuela Derr (GDR)	11.51
200 metres	Manuela Derr (GDR)	23.39	Jana Schönenberger (GDR)	23.49	Zoya Taurin (URS)	23.66
400 metres	Anke Wohlk (GDR)	52.74	Elena Solcan (ROM)	52.90	Julia Merino (ESP)	53.57
800 metres	Birte Bruhns (GDR)	2:01.86	Denisa Zavelca (ROM)	2:02.99	Stella Jongmans (NED)	2:04.76
1500 metres	Snežana Pajkić (YUG)	4:13.34	Anke Schaning (GDR)	4:14.29	Olga Yegorova (URS)	4:14.76
3000 metres	Olga Nazarkina (URS)	9:08.41	Anke Schaning (GDR)	9:08.66	Agata Balsamo (ITA)	9:18.96
10,000 metres	Olga Nazarkina (URS)	32:25.74	Mónica Gama (POR)	32:26.41	Larissa Alekseyeva (URS)	33:20.53
100 m hurdles	Ilka Ronisch (GDR)	13.27	Yuliya Filippova (URS)	13.36	Brigita Bukovec (YUG)	13.50
400 m hurdles	Silvia Rieger (FRG)	56.39	Anna Chuprina (URS)	56.70	Heike Meissner (GDR)	56.77
5000 m walk	Kathrin Born (GDR)	22:10.59	Olga Sánchez (ESP)	22:20.75	Fina Compte (ESP)	22:53.71
High jump	Yelena Yelesina (URS)	1.95 m	Svetlana Lavrova (URS)	1.93 m	Šárka Kašpárková (TCH)	1.91 m
Long jump	Mirela Belu (ROM)	6.58 m	Erica Johansson (SWE)	6.50 m	Lyudmila Galkina (URS)	6.44 m
Shot put	Astrid Kumbernuss (GDR)	19.53 m	Gabriele Volkl (FRG)	17.19 m	Renata Brukova (TCH)	17.18 m
Discus throw	Astrid Kumbernuss (GDR)	63.70 m	Jana Lauren (GDR)	62.38 m	Jacqueline Goormachtigh (NED)	57.02 m
Javelin throw	Karen Forkel (GDR)	70.12 m	Britta Heydrich (GDR)	63.44 m	Nathalie Teppe (FRA)	55.88 m
4 × 100 m relay	France (FRA); Florence Ropars; Magalie Simioneck; Hélène Declerck; Odiah Sidibé	44.23	West Germany (FRG); Melanie Paschke; Katrin Bartschat; Stefanie Hütz; Katja Seidel	44.71	East Germany (GDR); Ilka Rönisch; Manuela Derr; Jana Schönenberger; Andrea Philipp	44.99
4 × 400 m relay	East Germany (GDR); Manuela Derr; Anja Rücker; Heike Meissner; Birte Bruhns	3:33.38	Soviet Union (URS); Yana Manuylova; Anna Mironova; Natalya Sniga; Viktoria Miloserdova	3:35.09	West Germany (FRG); Anke Feller; Amona-Nicola Schneeweis; Tanja Schnabel; Silvia Rieger	3:36.49
Heptathlon	Tatyana Blokhina (URS)	6032 pts	Beatrice Mau (GDR)	5974 pts	Marcela Podracka (TCH)	5960 pts

== Medal table ==
Rank	Nation	Gold	Silver	Bronze	Total
1	East Germany (GDR)	12	10	4	26
2	Soviet Union (URS)	11	10	9	30
3	West Germany (FRG)	3	2	3	8
4	Italy (ITA)	3	1	4	8
5	Great Britain (GBR)	2	5	4	11
6	France (FRA)	2	2	1	5
7	Sweden (SWE)	2	1	2	5
8	Poland (POL)	2	1	0	3
9	Romania (ROU)	1	3	0	4
10	Spain (ESP)	1	2	3	6
11	Finland (FIN)	1	1	1	3
11	Yugoslavia (YUG)	1	1	1	3
13	Greece (GRE)	0	1	0	1
13	Portugal (POR)	0	1	0	1
15	Czechoslovakia (TCH)	0	0	5	5
16	Netherlands (NED)	0	0	2	2
17	Belgium (BEL)	0	0	1	1
17	Bulgaria (BUL)	0	0	1	1
Totals (18 entries)		41	41	41	123
