= Edward Stawiarz =

Polish long-distance runner

Personal information
- Nationality: Polish
- Born: 16 June 1940 (age 86) Kraków, Poland

Sport
- Sport: Long-distance running
- Event: Marathon

Edward Stawiarz (born 16 June 1940) is a Polish long-distance runner. He competed in the marathon at the 1972 Summer Olympics.

He was a 16-time medalist at the Polish national championships.
