= Tomasz Mateusiak =

Polish long jumper

Tomasz Mateusiak (born 5 December 1980) is a retired Polish long jumper.

He won the bronze medal at the 1999 European Junior Championships, and finished fourth at the 2003 Summer Universiade. He also competed in the 1998 World Junior Championships and the 2005 European Indoor Championships without reaching the final. He became Polish champion in 1999, 2002, 2003 and 2005, and Polish indoor champion in 2004 and 2005.

His personal best jump was 8.08 metres, achieved in August 2003 in Königs Wusterhausen.
