= Danuta Berezowska-Prociów =

Polish high jumper (born 1948)

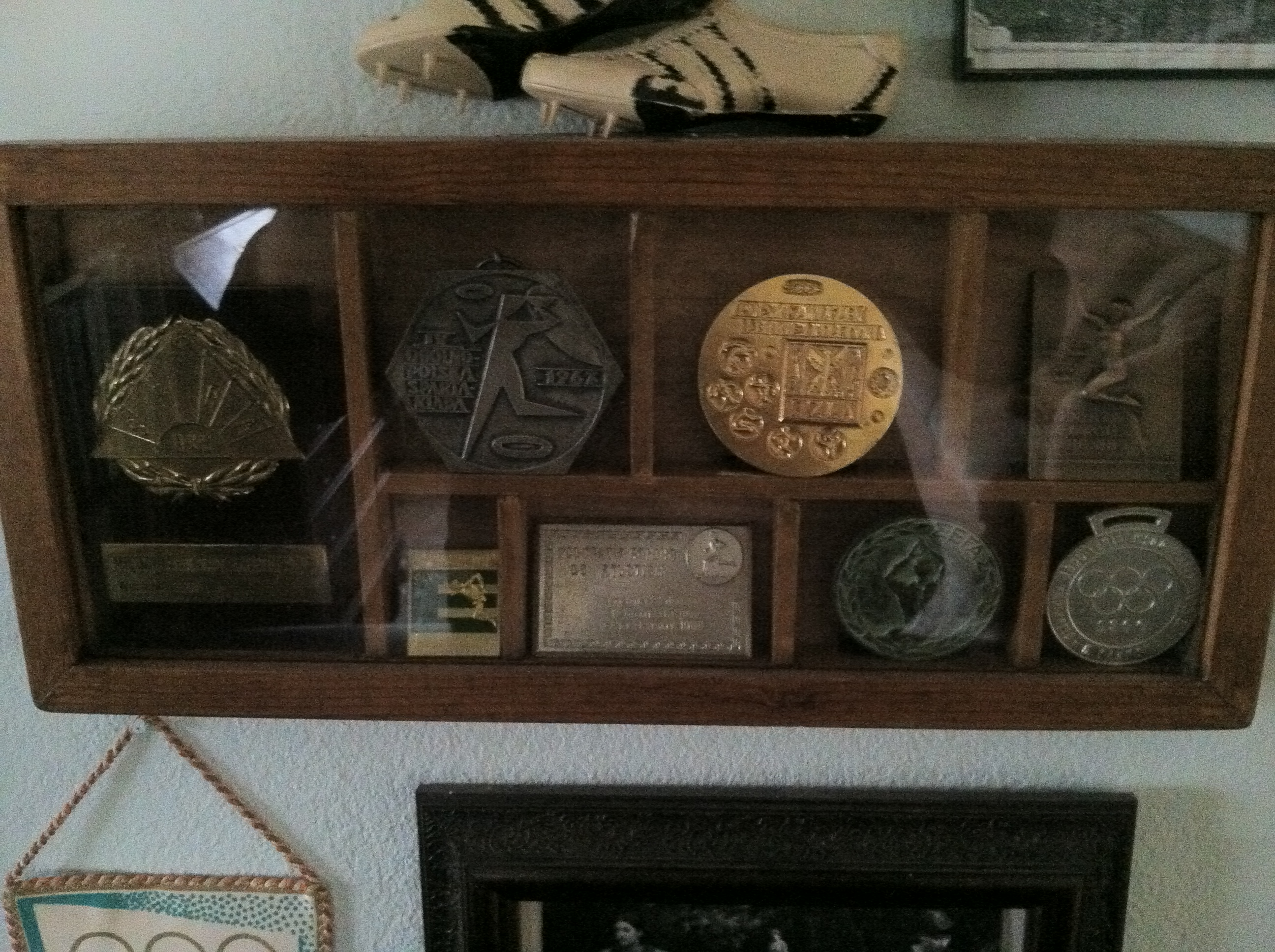
Some of Danuta's Medals

Danuta Berezowska-Prociów (née Berezowska; born 7 July 1948) is a Polish former track and field athlete who specialized in the high jump.

Born in Szopienice, she placed eighth at the 1966 European Junior Games, seventh at the 1969 European Indoor Games, and sixth at the 1970 European Athletics Indoor Championships.

During her career she claimed three national titles in the high jump at the Polish Athletics Championships, winning in 1968, 1969 and 1971. She broke the Polish record for the discipline on two occasions: she cleared 1.77 m (5 ft 9 1/2 in) in 1968 and improved this to 1.78 m (5 ft 10 in) the following year. She was a member of the AZS Kraków sports club during her career.
