= Roman Golanowski =

Polish long jumper

Roman Golanowski (born 14 January 1969) is a retired long jumper from Poland.

He was born in Wrocław, and represented the club Śląsk Wrocław. He competed at the 1992 Summer Olympics without reaching the final. He became Polish champion in 1992, 1993 and 1994.

His personal best jump was 8.09 metres, achieved in June 1992 in Grudziądz.
