= Krystyna Nadolna =

Polish discus thrower

Personal information
- Born: 23 December 1949 (age 76) Grabowiec, Kujawsko-Pomorskie, Poland

Sport
- Sport: Athletics

Krystyna Nadolna (born 23 December 1949) is a former Polish female discus thrower. She represented Poland at the 1972 Summer Olympics.
