= Marek Zalewski =

Polish sprinter

Marek Zalewski (born 27 July 1970 in Koło) is a Polish retired athlete who competed in sprinting events. He represented Poland at two World Championships, in 1991 and 1993. In addition, he won three medals at the 1989 European Junior Championships.

== Competition record ==
Year	Competition	Venue	Position	Event	Notes
Representing Poland
1989	European Junior Championships	Varaždin, Yugoslavia	2nd	100 m	10.52
1989	European Junior Championships	Varaždin, Yugoslavia	1st	200 m	21.06
1989	European Junior Championships	Varaždin, Yugoslavia	1st	4x100 m relay	40.00
1991	World Championships	Tokyo, Japan	9th (h)	4x100 m relay	39.08
1992	European Indoor Championships	Genoa, Italy	10th (sf)	200 m	21.66
1993	World Championships	Stuttgart, Germany	28th (h)	100 m	10.49
1994	European Championships	Helsinki, Finland	35th (h)	100 m	10.69

== Personal bests ==
Outdoor

- 100 metres – 10.36 (+1.0 m/s, Warsaw 1992)
- 200 metres – 20.82 (+0.8 m/s, Warsaw 1992)

Indoor

- 60 metres – 6.67 (1994)
- 200 metres – 21.13 (Spała 1993)
