= Jerzy Hewelt =

Polish hurdler

Personal information
- Born: 23 August 1948 (age 78) Trzebież, Poland

Sport
- Sport: Track and field
Medal record
Representing Poland
Summer Universiade
Gold medal – first place	1975 Rome	4x400m relay
Silver medal – second place	1975 Rome	400m hurdles

Jerzy Hewelt (born 23 August 1948) is a Polish former hurdler who competed in the 1976 Summer Olympics.
