= Mirosław Hydel =

Polish long jumper

Mirosław Hydel (born 24 July 1963) is a retired Polish long jumper.

He finished eighth at the 1988 European Indoor Championships. He became Polish champion in 1988 and 1989.

His personal best jump was 8.08 metres, achieved in May 1986 in Granada.
