= Waldemar Glinka =

Polish long-distance runner

Personal information
- Born: 9 January 1968 (age 58) Jelenia Góra, Poland

Sport
- Sport: Marathon running

Waldemar Glinka (born 9 January 1968) is a former Polish long-distance runner.

Glinka finished 34th in the marathon at the 2004 Summer Olympics.

Glinka won the 2000 Hannover Marathon with a time of 2:12.55. His P.R. for the event is 2:11:40, set in a race in Japan.
