= Aniela Nikiel =

Polish long-distance runner

Personal information
- Nationality: Polish
- Born: 1 November 1965 (age 60) Bielsko-Biała, Poland

Sport
- Sport: Long-distance running
- Event: Marathon

Aniela Katarzyna Nikiel-Głogosz (born 1 November 1965) is a retired Polish long-distance runner. She competed in the women's marathon at the 1996 Summer Olympics, finishing in 29th place with a time of 2:36:44. Four years earlier she won the Warsaw Marathon in a time of 2:42:27. In 1995 she won the Toruń Marathon with a time of 2:37:07. In 1999 she placed fifth in the Berlin Marathon, running a time of 2:29:27.

== Personal best performances ==
Event	Time	Year
10,000 m	33.25.41	1996
Half marathon	1:10.04	1997
Marathon	2:29.19	1995
