= Bernadetta Blechacz =

Polish javelin thrower (born 1955)

Personal information
- Full name: Bernadetta Grażyna Blechacz
- Born: 30 July 1955 (age 70) Kcynia, Kuyavian-Pomeranian
- Height: 167 cm (5 ft 6 in)
- Weight: 62 kg (137 lb)

Bernadeta Grażyna Blechacz (born 30 July 1955 in Kcynia, Kuyavian-Pomeranian) is a former javelin thrower from Poland, who set her personal best in 1979, throwing 62.76 metres. She competed for her native country at the 1980 Summer Olympics in Moscow, USSR, finishing in ninth place (61.46 metres) in the overall-rankings.
