= Lech Boguszewicz =

Polish long-distance runner

Personal information
- Nationality: Polish
- Born: 27 August 1938 Wilno, Poland
- Died: 9 August 2010 (aged 71) Gdańsk, Poland
- Height: 174 cm (5 ft 9 in)
- Weight: 66 kg (146 lb)

Sport
- Sport: Athletics
- Event: Long-distance running
- Club: SLA Sopot

Lech Felicjan Boguszewicz (27 August 1938 – 9 August 2010) was a Polish long-distance runner. He competed in the men's 5000 metres at the 1964 Summer Olympics.

Boguszewicz won the British AAA Championships title in the 3 miles event at the 1964 AAA Championships.
