= Dębowo =

Dębowo may refer to:

- Dębowo, Brodnica County in Kuyavian-Pomeranian Voivodeship (north-central Poland)
- Dębowo, Świecie County in Kuyavian-Pomeranian Voivodeship (north-central Poland)
- Dębowo, Nakło County in Kuyavian-Pomeranian Voivodeship (north-central Poland)
- Dębowo, Augustów County in Podlaskie Voivodeship (north-east Poland)
- Dębowo, Bielsk County in Podlaskie Voivodeship (north-east Poland)
- Dębowo, Łomża County in Podlaskie Voivodeship (north-east Poland)
- Dębowo, Suwałki County in Podlaskie Voivodeship (north-east Poland)
- Dębowo, Ciechanów County in Masovian Voivodeship (east-central Poland)
- Dębowo, Sierpc County in Masovian Voivodeship (east-central Poland)
- Dębowo, Lubusz Voivodeship (west Poland)
- Dębowo, Bytów County in Pomeranian Voivodeship (north Poland)
- Dębowo, Kartuzy County in Pomeranian Voivodeship (north Poland)
- Dębowo, Warmian-Masurian Voivodeship (north Poland)
- Dębowo, West Pomeranian Voivodeship (north-west Poland)
