= Żebrowski =

Żebrowski (feminine: Żebrowska; plural: Żebrowscy) is a Polish locational surname, which means a person from a place called Żebro or Żebry in Poland. The name may refer to:

Gary Zebrowski (born 1951) an International Business Service Executive and an American who served as the Assistant Naval Attaché in the U.S. Embassy in Beijing, People’s Republic of China under the Reagan Administration, and an intelligence official as an Operations Officer in the CIA.

- Dawid Żebrowski (born 1997), Polish athlete
- Elżbieta Żebrowska (1945–2021), Polish athlete
- Gary Zebrowski (born 1984), French snowboarder
- George Zebrowski (1945–2024), American science fiction writer and editor
- Gerhard Zebrowski (1940–2020), German footballer
- Henry Zebrowski (born 1984), American actor and comedian
- Izabela Żebrowska Kowalińska (born 1985), Polish volleyball player
- Kazimierz Żebrowski (1891–c. 1945), Polish ice hockey player
- Kenneth Zebrowski (1946–2007), American politician
- Kenneth Zebrowski, Jr. (born 1980), American politician
- Marcin Żebrowski, Polish television presenter
- Michał Żebrowski (born 1972), Polish actor
- Thomas Zebrowski (1714–1758), Lithuanian architect and scientist
- Tya Zebrowski (born 2011), French surfer
- Walenty Żebrowski (died 1764), Polish painter
