= Śniadowo =

Śniadowo may refer to several places:

- Śniadowo, Masovian Voivodeship (east-central Poland)
- Śniadowo, Podlaskie Voivodeship (north-east Poland)
- Śniadowo, Warmian-Masurian Voivodeship in Warmian-Masurian Voivodeship (north Poland)

== See also ==
- Śniadowo-Stara Stacja in Podlaskie Voivodeship (north-eastern Poland)
