= Jeziorki (disambiguation) =

Jeziorki is a neighbourhood of Warsaw, in Masovian Voivodeship.

Jeziorki may also refer to:

- Jeziorki, Brodnica County in Kuyavian-Pomeranian Voivodeship (north-central Poland)
- Jeziorki, Świecie County in Kuyavian-Pomeranian Voivodeship (north-central Poland)
- Jeziorki, Mogilno County in Kuyavian-Pomeranian Voivodeship (central Poland)
- Jeziorki, Leszno County in Greater Poland Voivodeship (west-central Poland)
- Jeziorki, Piła County in Greater Poland Voivodeship (west-central Poland)
- Jeziorki, Poznań County in Greater Poland Voivodeship (west-central Poland)
- Jeziorki, Wągrowiec County in Greater Poland Voivodeship (west-central Poland)
- Jeziorki, Lubusz Voivodeship (west Poland)
- Jeziorki, Augustów County in Podlaskie Voivodeship (north-east Poland)
- Jeziorki, Sejny County in Podlaskie Voivodeship (north-east Poland)
- Jeziorki, Suwałki County in Podlaskie Voivodeship (north-east Poland)
- Jeziorki, Pomeranian Voivodeship (north Poland)
- Jeziorki, Kołobrzeg County in West Pomeranian Voivodeship (north-west Poland)
- Jeziorki, Świętokrzyskie Voivodeship (south Poland)
- Jeziorki, Szczecinek County in West Pomeranian Voivodeship (north-west Poland)
- Jeziorki, Wałcz County in West Pomeranian Voivodeship (north-west Poland)
