= Piotr Gładki =

Polish long-distance runner (1972–2005)

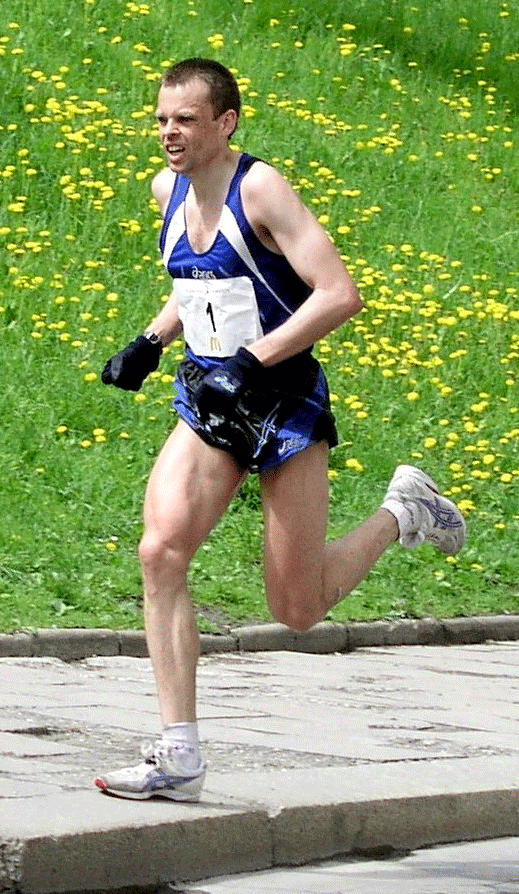

Personal information
- Born: 8 February 1972 Gdańsk, Poland
- Died: 27 May 2005 (aged 33) Wyczechowo, Poland

Piotr Gładki (8 February 1972 – 27 May 2005) was a long-distance runner from Poland, who won the 2000 edition of the Hamburg Marathon. He represented his native country at the 2000 Summer Olympics in Sydney, Australia, where he didn't finish in the men's marathon race. Gładki died in a car crash at age 33.
