= Jakac =

Jakac may refer to:

- Jakać, a river of Poland
- Božidar Jakac (1899–1989), Slovene Yugoslav artist
