= Strzygi =

Strzygi may refer to:

- Strzygi, Brodnica County, Poland
- Strzygi, Włocławek County, Poland
