= Rokitki =

Rokitki may refer to the following places in Poland:

- Rokitki, Lower Silesian Voivodeship (south-west Poland)
- Rokitki, Kuyavian-Pomeranian Voivodeship (north-central Poland)
- Rokitki, Bytów County in Pomeranian Voivodeship (north Poland)
- Rokitki, Kartuzy County in Pomeranian Voivodeship (north Poland)
- Rokitki, Tczew County in Pomeranian Voivodeship (north Poland)
