= Uśnik =

- Village
- Location within Poland
- Coordinates: 53°5′11″N 21°54′56″E
- Country: Poland
- Voivodeship: Podlaskie
- County: Łomża
- Gmina: Śniadowo
- Population: 180

Uśnik [ˈuɕnik] is a village in the administrative district of Gmina Śniadowo, within Łomża County, Podlaskie Voivodeship, in north-eastern Poland. It lays approximately 8 km (5 mi) north-west of Śniadowo, 15 km (9 mi) south-west of Łomża, and 84 km (52 mi) west of the regional capital Białystok.
