= Mężenin =

Mężenin may refer to the following places:

- Mężenin, Masovian Voivodeship (east-central Poland)
- Mężenin, Łomża County in Podlaskie Voivodeship (north-east Poland)
- Mężenin, Zambrów County in Podlaskie Voivodeship (north-east Poland)
