= Lisia Góra =

Lisia Góra may refer to the following places:

- Lisia Góra, Lesser Poland Voivodeship (south Poland)
- Lisia Góra, Lubusz Voivodeship (west Poland)
- Lisia Góra, Kartuzy County in Pomeranian Voivodeship (north Poland)
- Lisia Góra, Słupsk County in Pomeranian Voivodeship (north Poland)
- Lisia Góra, West Pomeranian Voivodeship (north-west Poland)
