= Jastrząbka Młoda =

Village in Gmina Śniadowo, Poland

- Village
- Location within Poland
- Coordinates: 52°59′30″N 21°57′50″E
- Country: Poland
- Voivodeship: Podlaskie
- County: Łomża
- Gmina: Śniadowo

Jastrząbka Młoda [jasˈtʂɔmpka ˈmwɔda] is a village in the administrative district of Gmina Śniadowo, within Łomża County, Podlaskie Voivodeship, in north-eastern Poland.
