= Starkowa Huta =

- Village
- Location within Poland
- Coordinates: 54°13′34″N 18°10′58″E
- Country: Poland
- Voivodeship: Pomeranian
- County: Kartuzy
- Gmina: Somonino
- Population: 380

Starkowa Huta [starˈkɔva ˈxuta] is a village in the administrative district of Gmina Somonino, within Kartuzy County, Pomeranian Voivodeship, in northern Poland.

For details of the history of the region, see History of Pomerania.
