= Szabły Młode =

- Village
- Location within Poland
- Coordinates: 53°2′N 21°55′E
- Country: Poland
- Voivodeship: Podlaskie
- County: Łomża
- Gmina: Śniadowo
- Population (approx.): 150

Szabły Młode [ˈʂabwɨ ˈmwɔdɛ] is a village in the administrative district of Gmina Śniadowo, within Łomża County, Podlaskie Voivodeship, in north-eastern Poland.

== See also ==
- Jakać
