= Zalesie-Wypychy =

- Village
- Location within Poland
- Coordinates: 53°3′7″N 21°57′13″E
- Country: Poland
- Voivodeship: Podlaskie
- County: Łomża
- Gmina: Śniadowo

Zalesie-Wypychy [zaˈlɛɕɛ vɨˈpɨxɨ] is a village in the administrative district of Gmina Śniadowo, within Łomża County, Podlaskie Voivodeship, in north-eastern Poland.
