= Sumin, Brodnica County =

Sumin
- Village
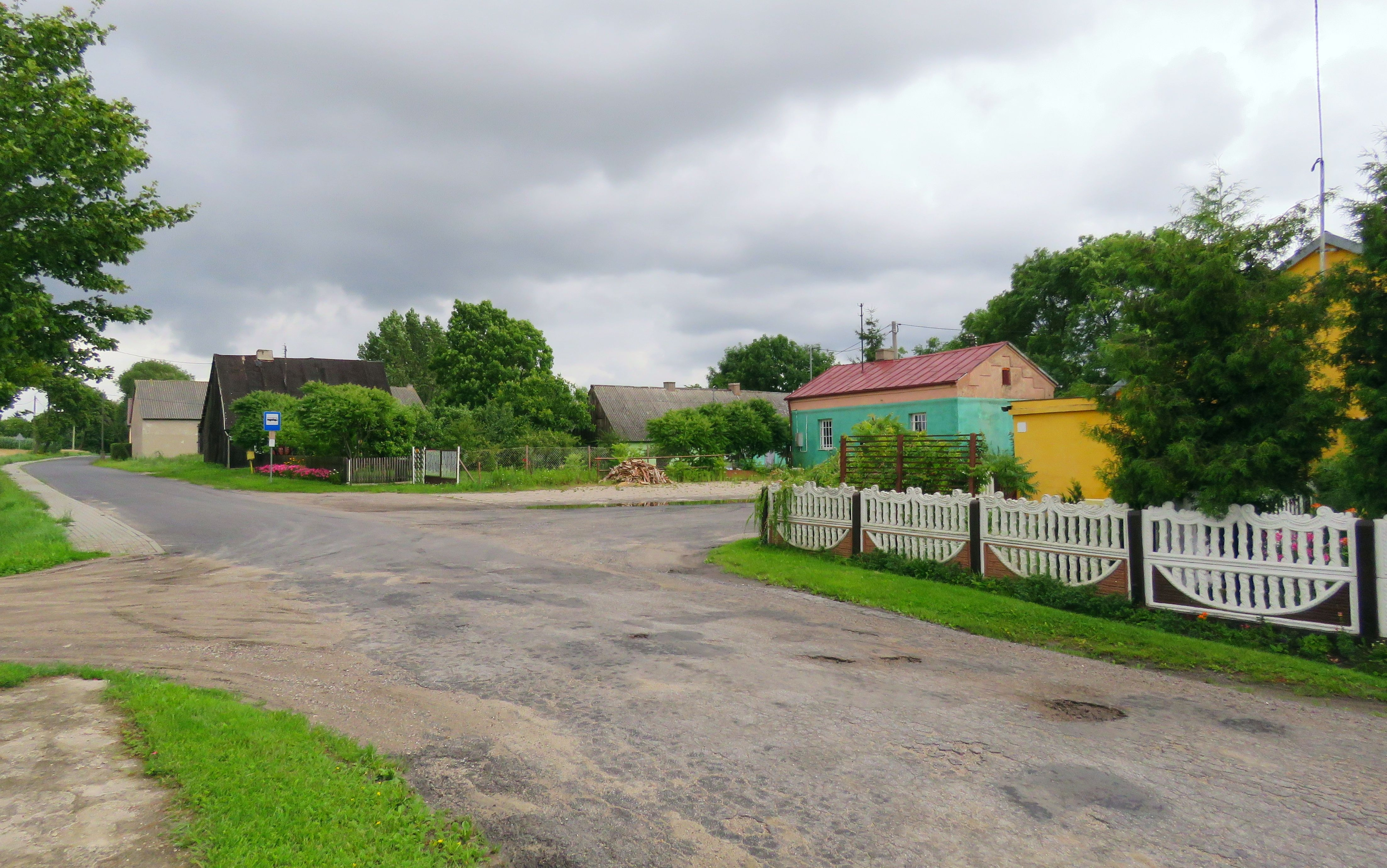

- Location within Poland
- Coordinates: 53°07′20″N 19°25′08″E
- Country: Poland
- Voivodeship: Kuyavian-Pomeranian
- County: Brodnica
- Gmina: Osiek

Sumin [ˈsumin] is a village in the administrative district of Gmina Osiek, within Brodnica County, Kuyavian-Pomeranian Voivodeship, in north-central Poland.
