= Graniczny Dwór =

- Settlement
- Location within Poland
- Coordinates: 54°15′22″N 18°11′44″E
- Country: Poland
- Voivodeship: Pomeranian
- County: Kartuzy
- Gmina: Somonino

Graniczny Dwór [ɡraˈnit͡ʂnɨ ˈdvur] is a settlement in the administrative district of Gmina Somonino, within Kartuzy County, Pomeranian Voivodeship, in northern Poland.

For details of the history of the region, see History of Pomerania.
