= Tomaszewo, Brodnica County =

Tomaszewo
- Village
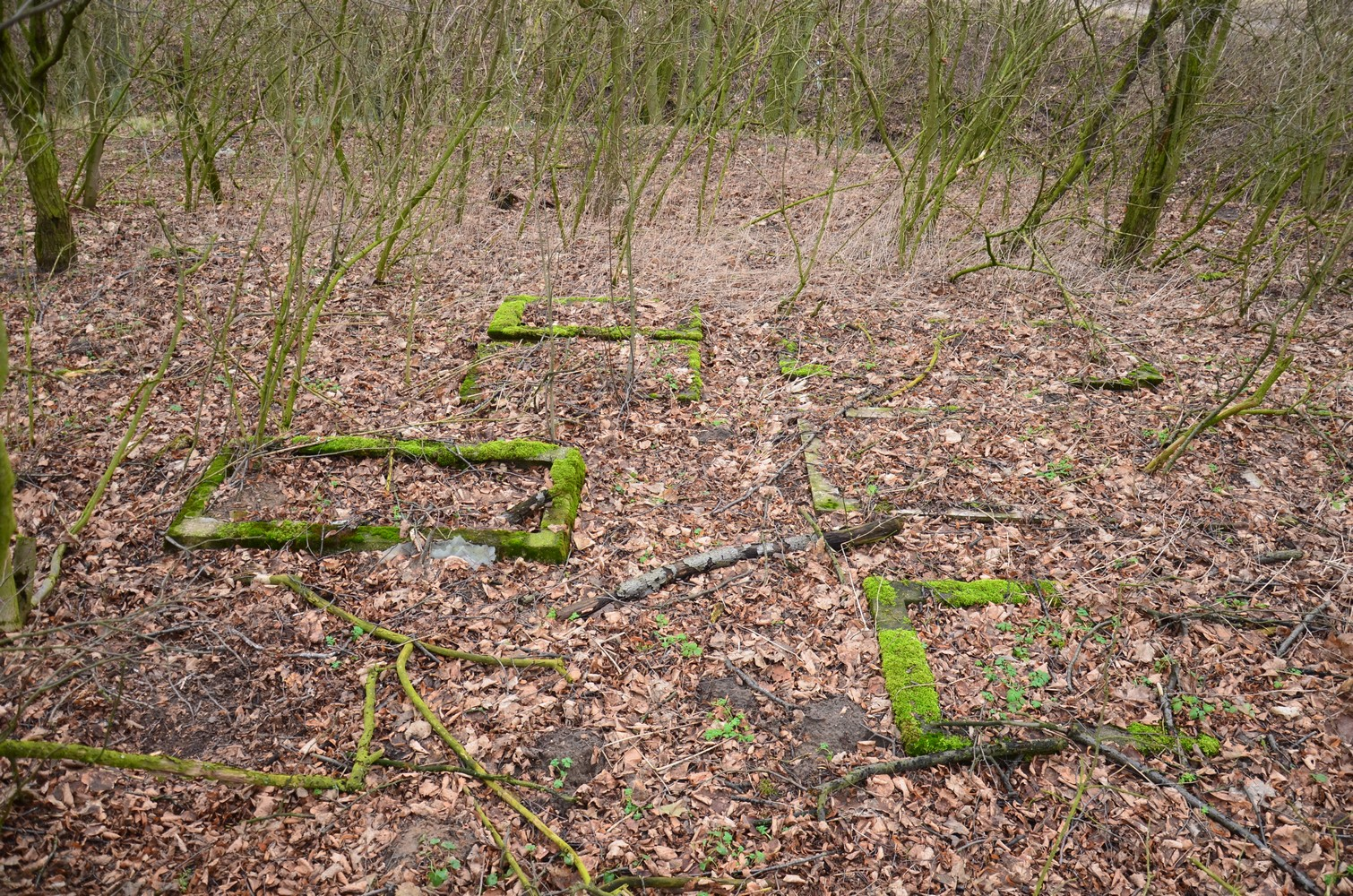

- Location within Poland
- Coordinates: 53°09′00″N 19°21′20″E
- Country: Poland
- Voivodeship: Kuyavian-Pomeranian
- County: Brodnica
- Gmina: Osiek

Tomaszewo [tɔmaˈʂɛvɔ] is a village in the administrative district of Gmina Osiek, within Brodnica County, Kuyavian-Pomeranian Voivodeship, in north-central Poland.
