= Kołaczki =

Village in Gmina Śniadowo, Poland

- Village
- Location within Poland
- Coordinates: 53°05′23″N 22°02′16″E
- Country: Poland
- Voivodeship: Podlaskie
- County: Łomża
- Gmina: Śniadowo
- Population: 50

Kołaczki [kɔˈwat͡ʂki] is a village in the administrative district of Gmina Śniadowo, within Łomża County, Podlaskie Voivodeship, in north-eastern Poland.
