= Sumówko, Gmina Osiek =

Sumówko
- Village
- Location within Poland
- Coordinates: 53°07′33″N 19°27′02″E
- Country: Poland
- Voivodeship: Kuyavian-Pomeranian
- County: Brodnica
- Gmina: Osiek

Sumówko [suˈmufkɔ] is a village in the administrative district of Gmina Osiek, within Brodnica County, Kuyavian-Pomeranian Voivodeship, in north-central Poland.
