= Gmina Śniadowo =

Gmina Śniadowo Śniadowo Commune
- Gmina
- Coat of arms

- Gmina Śniadowo within the Łomża County
- Coordinates (Śniadowo): 53°2′N 21°59′E
- Country: Poland
- Voivodeship: Podlaskie
- County: Łomża County
- Seat: Śniadowo

Area
  - Total: 162.59 km^{2} (62.78 sq mi)

Population (2011)
  - Total: 5,592
  - Density: 34.39/km^{2} (89.08/sq mi)
- Website: http://www.sniadowo.powiatlomzynski.pl

Gmina Śniadowo is a rural gmina (administrative district) in Łomża County, Podlaskie Voivodeship, in north-eastern Poland. Its seat is the village of Śniadowo, which lies approximately 17 kilometres (11 mi) south-west of Łomża and 80 km (50 mi) west of the regional capital Białystok.

The gmina covers an area of 162.59 square kilometres (62.8 sq mi), and as of 2006 its total population is 5,668 (5,592 in 2011).

== Villages ==
Gmina Śniadowo contains the villages and settlements of Bagno, Brulin, Chomentowo, Dębowo, Doły, Duchny Młode, Grabowo, Jakać Borowa, Jakać Dworna, Jakać Młoda, Jakać-Borki, Jastrząbka Młoda, Jemielite-Wypychy, Kołaczki, Konopki Młode, Koryta, Koziki, Mężenin, Młynik, Olszewo, Osobne, Ratowo-Piotrowo, Sierzputy Zagajne, Sierzputy-Marki, Śniadowo, Śniadowo-Stara Stacja, Stara Jakać, Stara Jastrząbka, Stare Duchny, Stare Jemielite, Stare Konopki, Stare Ratowo, Stare Szabły, Strzeszewo, Szabły Młode, Szczepankowo, Truszki, Uśnik, Uśnik-Dwór, Uśnik-Kolonia, Wierzbowo, Wszerzecz, Wszerzecz-Kolonia, Zagroby, Zalesie-Poczynki, Zalesie-Wypychy, Żebry and Żebry-Kolonia.

== Neighbouring gminas ==
Gmina Śniadowo is bordered by the gminas of Czerwin, Łomża, Miastkowo, Stary Lubotyń, Szumowo, Troszyn and Zambrów.
