= Koryta, Podlaskie Voivodeship =

Koryta
- Village
- Location within Poland
- Coordinates: 53°01′55″N 21°58′15″E
- Country: Poland
- Voivodeship: Podlaskie
- County: Łomża
- Gmina: Śniadowo

Koryta [kɔˈrɨta] is a village in the administrative district of Gmina Śniadowo, within Łomża County, Podlaskie Voivodeship, in north-eastern Poland.
