= Wszerzecz =

- Village
- Location within Poland
- Coordinates: 53°6′41″N 21°56′00″E
- Country: Poland
- Voivodeship: Podlaskie
- County: Łomża
- Gmina: Śniadowo

Wszerzecz [ˈfʂɛʐɛt͡ʂ] is a village in the administrative district of Gmina Śniadowo, within Łomża County, Podlaskie Voivodeship, in north-eastern Poland.
