= Szynkowizna =

- Village
- Location within Poland
- Coordinates: 53°08′30″N 19°27′15″E
- Country: Poland
- Voivodeship: Kuyavian-Pomeranian
- County: Brodnica
- Gmina: Osiek

Szynkowizna [ʂɨŋkɔˈvizna] is a village in the administrative district of Gmina Osiek, within Brodnica County, Kuyavian-Pomeranian Voivodeship, in north-central Poland.
