= Nowy Dwór, Gmina Somonino =

Nowy Dwór
- Settlement
- Location within Poland
- Coordinates: 54°15′56″N 18°13′43″E
- Country: Poland
- Voivodeship: Pomeranian
- County: Kartuzy
- Gmina: Somonino

Nowy Dwór [ˈnɔvɨ ˈdvur] is a settlement in the administrative district of Gmina Somonino, within Kartuzy County, Pomeranian Voivodeship, in northern Poland.

For details of the history of the region, see History of Pomerania.
