= Uśnik-Kolonia =

- Village
- Location within Poland
- Coordinates: 53°05′13″N 21°52′45″E
- Country: Poland
- Voivodeship: Podlaskie
- County: Łomża
- Gmina: Śniadowo

Uśnik-Kolonia [ˈuɕnik kɔˈlɔɲa] is a village in the administrative district of Gmina Śniadowo, within Łomża County, Podlaskie Voivodeship, in north-eastern Poland.
