= Truszki, Gmina Śniadowo =

Truszki
- Village
- Location within Poland
- Coordinates: 53°2′19″N 21°57′27″E
- Country: Poland
- Voivodeship: Podlaskie
- County: Łomża
- Gmina: Śniadowo
- Population: 180

Truszki [ˈtruʂki] is a village in the administrative district of Gmina Śniadowo, within Łomża County, Podlaskie Voivodeship, in north-eastern Poland.
