= Gmina Osiek, Kuyavian-Pomeranian Voivodeship =

Gmina Osiek Osiek Commune
- Gmina
- Coat of arms
- Interactive map of Gmina Osiek
- Coordinates (Osiek): 53°10′N 19°23′E
- Country: Poland
- Voivodeship: Kuyavian-Pomeranian
- County: Brodnica
- Seat: Osiek

Area
  - Total: 75.12 km^{2} (29.00 sq mi)

Population (2011)
  - Total: 4,096
  - Density: 54.53/km^{2} (141.2/sq mi)
- Website: http://www.gminaosiek.pl/

Gmina Osiek is a rural gmina (administrative district) in Brodnica County, Kuyavian-Pomeranian Voivodeship, in north-central Poland. Its seat is the village of Osiek, which lies approximately 10 kilometres (6 mi) south of Brodnica and 54 km (34 mi) east of Toruń.

The gmina covers an area of 75.12 square kilometres (29.0 sq mi), and as of 2006, its total population is 4,079 (4,096 in 2011).

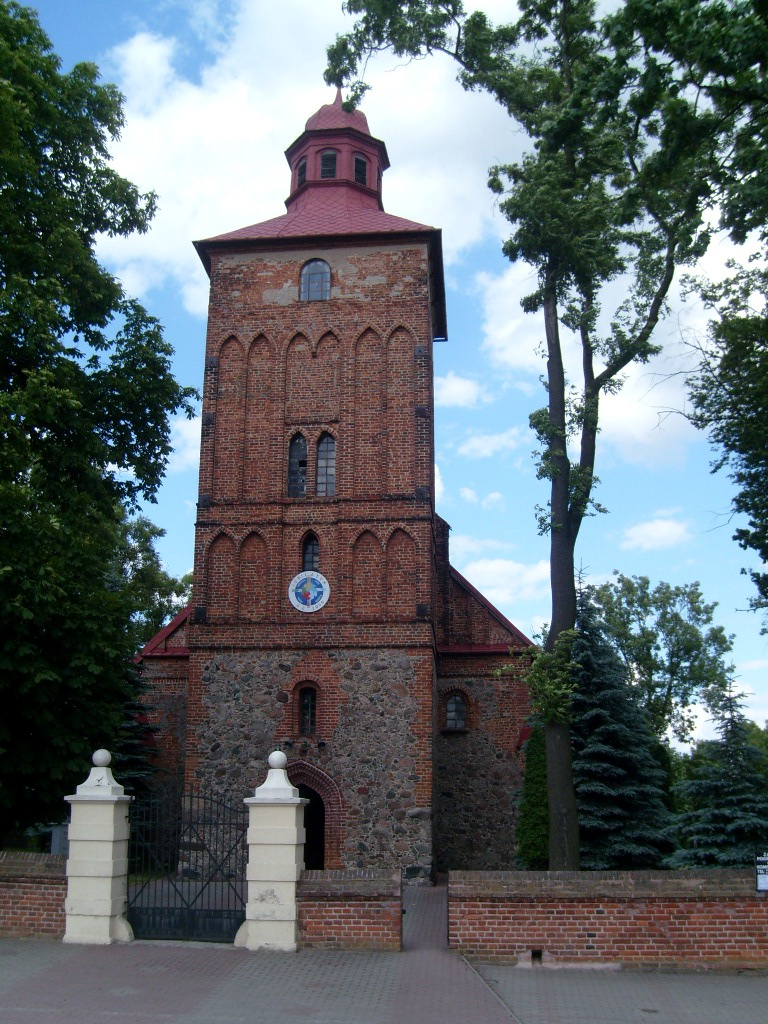
Osiek, church

== Villages ==
Gmina Osiek contains the villages and settlements of Dębowo, Jeziorki, Kretki Duże, Kretki Małe, Kujawa, Łapinóż, Obórki, Osiek, Osiek-Kolonia, Strzygi, Sumin, Sumówko, Szynkowizna, Tadajewo, Tomaszewo, Warpalice, and Wrzeszewo.

== Neighbouring gminas ==
Gmina Osiek is bordered by the gminas of Nowe, Rypin, Świedziebnia, and Wąpielsk.
