= Połęczyno =

- Village
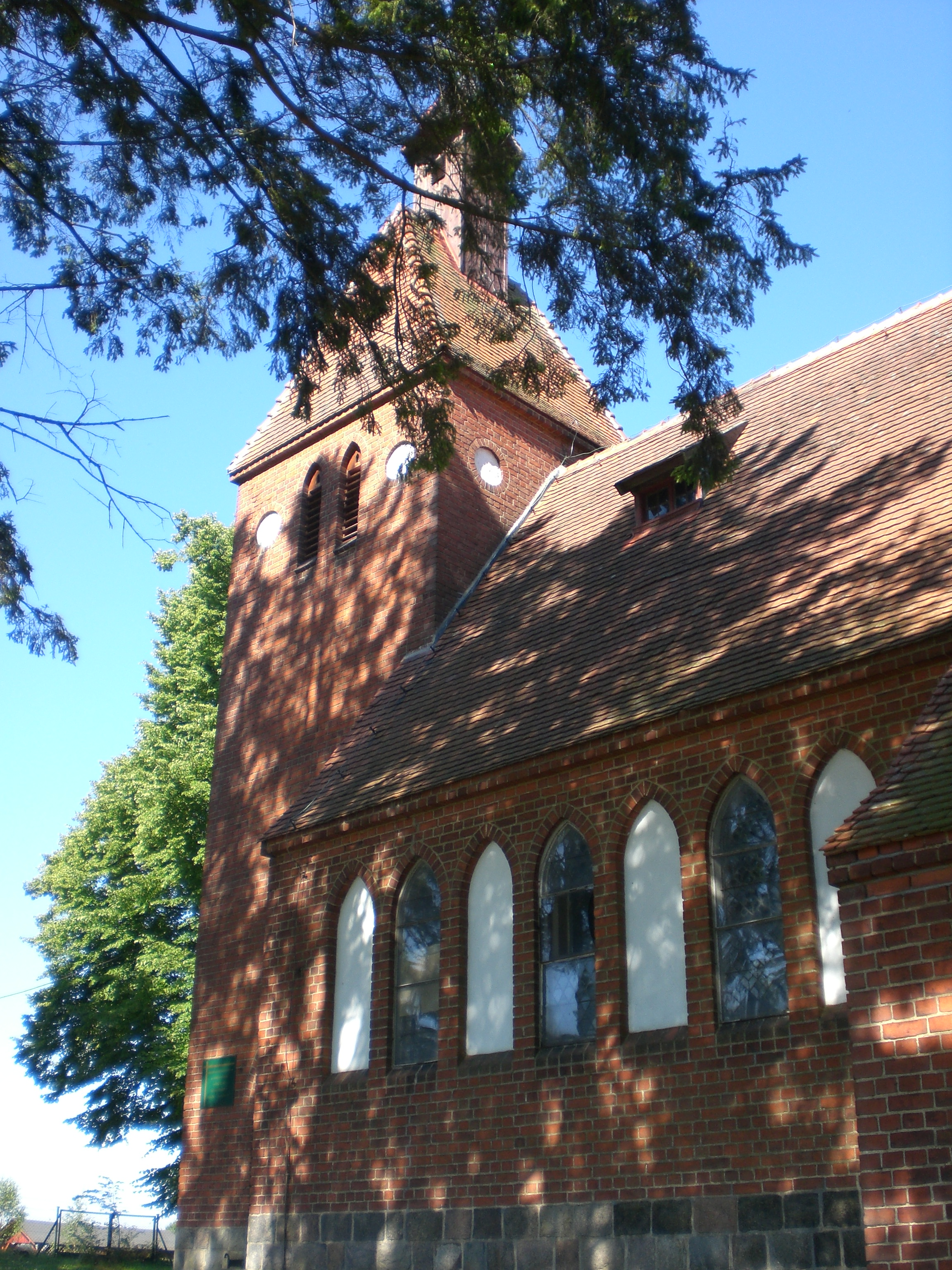
- Saint Andrew Bobola church in Połęczyno

- Location within Poland
- Coordinates: 54°11′57″N 18°12′27″E
- Country: Poland
- Voivodeship: Pomeranian
- County: Kartuzy
- Gmina: Somonino
- Population: 335
- Time zone: UTC+1 (CET)
  - Summer (DST): UTC+2 (CEST)
- Vehicle registration: GKA

Połęczyno [pɔwɛnˈt͡ʂɨnɔ] is a village in the administrative district of Gmina Somonino, within Kartuzy County, Pomeranian Voivodeship, in northern Poland. It is located in the ethnocultural region of Kashubia in the historic region of Pomerania.

== History ==
Połęczyno was a private church village of the monastery in Kartuzy, administratively located in the Tczew County in the Pomeranian Voivodeship of the Kingdom of Poland. It was annexed by Prussia in the First Partition of Poland in 1772. Following World War I, Poland regained independence and control of the village.

During the German occupation of Poland (World War II), Połęczyno was one of the sites of executions of Poles, carried out by the Germans in 1939 as part of the Intelligenzaktion. Poles from Połęczyno were also victims of massacres of Poles committed by the Germans in 1939 in nearby Kaliska and Egiertowo.
