= Sarni Dwór-Leśniczówka =

- Settlement
- Location within Poland
- Coordinates: 54°15′36″N 18°15′35″E
- Country: Poland
- Voivodeship: Pomeranian
- County: Kartuzy
- Gmina: Somonino

Sarni Dwór-Leśniczówka (Polish pronunciation: [ˈsarɲi ˈdvur lɛɕɲiˈtʂufka]) is a settlement in the administrative district of Gmina Somonino, within Kartuzy County, Pomeranian Voivodeship, in northern Poland.

For details of the history of the region, see History of Pomerania.
