= Konopki Młode =

- Village
- Location within Poland
- Coordinates: 53°04′19″N 22°00′38″E
- Country: Poland
- Voivodeship: Podlaskie
- County: Łomża
- Gmina: Śniadowo

Konopki Młode [kɔˈnɔpki ˈmwɔdɛ] is a village in the administrative district of Gmina Śniadowo, within Łomża County, Podlaskie Voivodeship, in north-eastern Poland.
