= Żebry-Kolonia =

- Village
- Location within Poland
- Coordinates: 53°04′55″N 21°59′14″E
- Country: Poland
- Voivodeship: Podlaskie
- County: Łomża
- Gmina: Śniadowo

Żebry-Kolonia [ˈʐɛbrɨ kɔˈlɔɲa] is a village in the administrative district of Gmina Śniadowo, within Łomża County, Podlaskie Voivodeship, in north-eastern Poland.
