= Ostrzyce, Pomeranian Voivodeship =

Ostrzyce
- Village
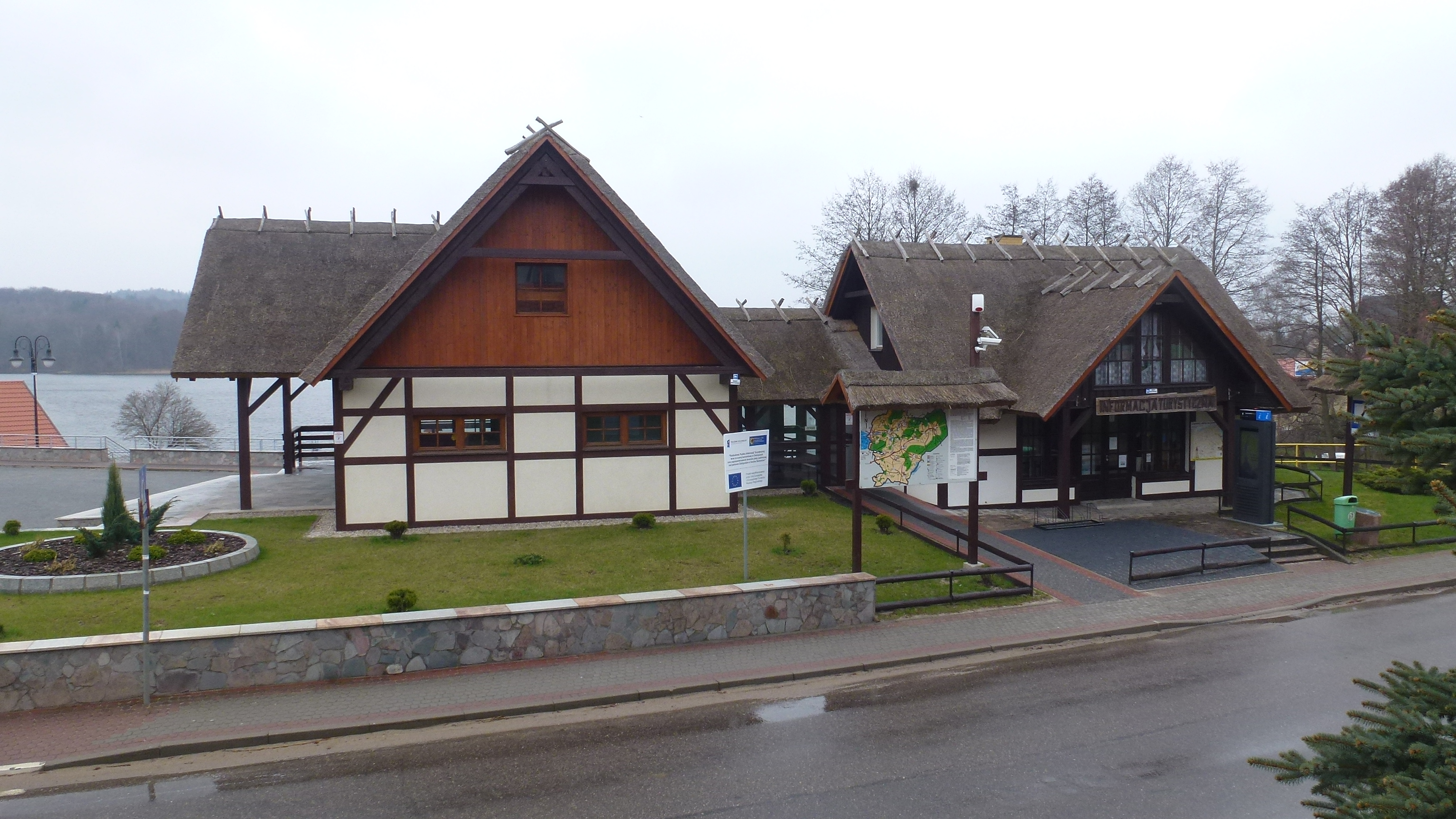

- Location within Poland
- Coordinates: 54°15′26″N 18°6′38″E
- Country: Poland
- Voivodeship: Pomeranian
- County: Kartuzy
- Gmina: Somonino
- Population: 460

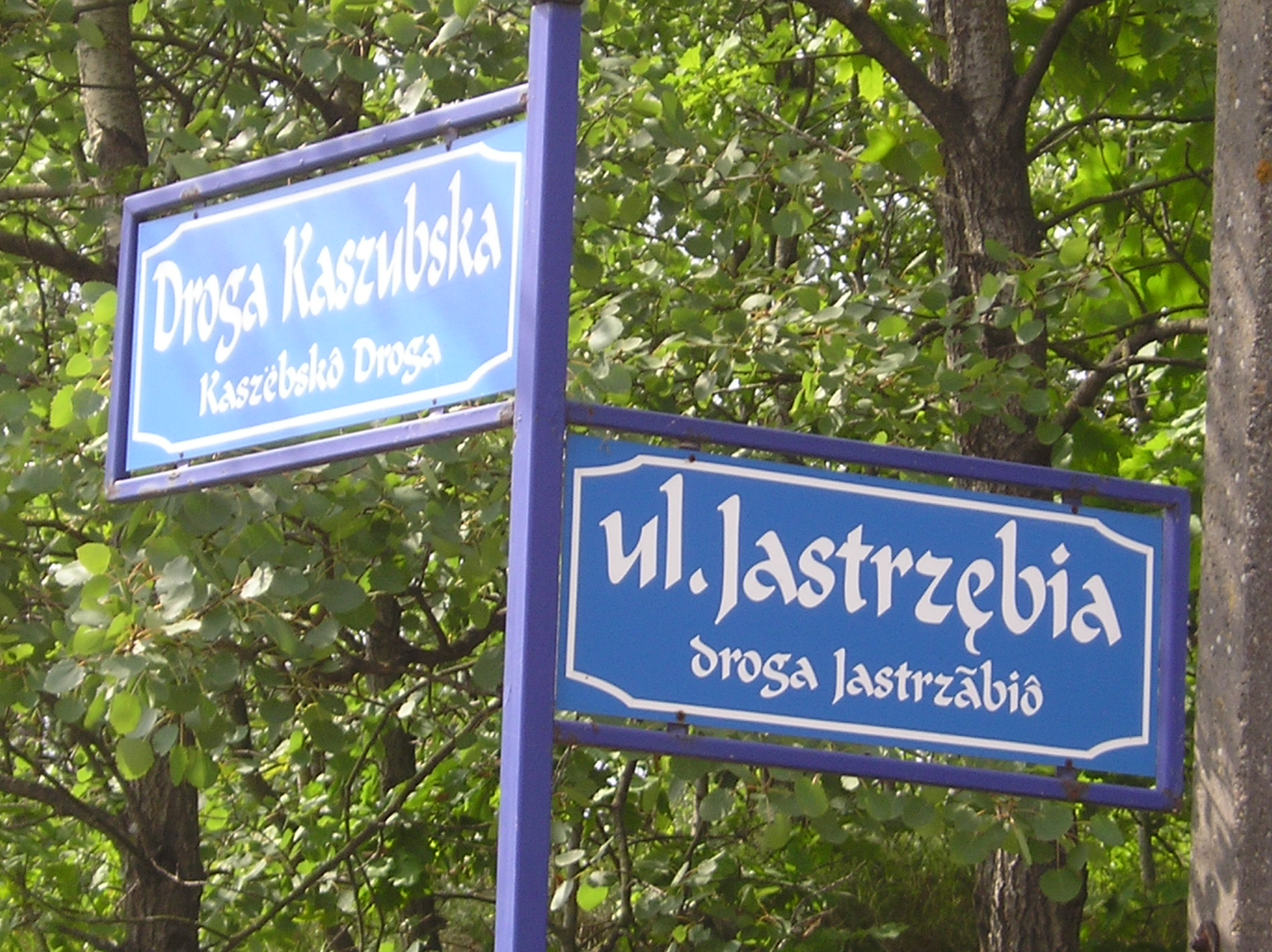
Ostrzyce in Polish and Cashubian

Ostrzyce [ɔsˈtʂɨt͡sɛ] (Cashubian: Òstrzëce) is a village in the administrative district of Gmina Somonino, within Kartuzy County, Pomeranian Voivodeship, in northern Poland.

For details of the history of the region, see History of Pomerania.
