= Jeknica =

- Village
- Location within Poland
- Coordinates: 54°12′37″N 18°12′15″E
- Country: Poland
- Voivodeship: Pomeranian
- County: Kartuzy
- Gmina: Somonino
- Population: 47

Jeknica [jɛkˈnit͡sa] is a village in the administrative district of Gmina Somonino, within Kartuzy County, Pomeranian Voivodeship, in northern Poland.

For details of the history of the region, see History of Pomerania.
