= Jakać-Borki =

- Village
- Location within Poland
- Coordinates: 53°02′07″N 21°56′18″E
- Country: Poland
- Voivodeship: Podlaskie
- County: Łomża
- Gmina: Śniadowo

Jakać-Borki [ˈjakat͡ɕ ˈbɔrki] is a village in the administrative district of Gmina Śniadowo, within Łomża County, Podlaskie Voivodeship, in north-eastern Poland.
