= Egiertowo =

- Village
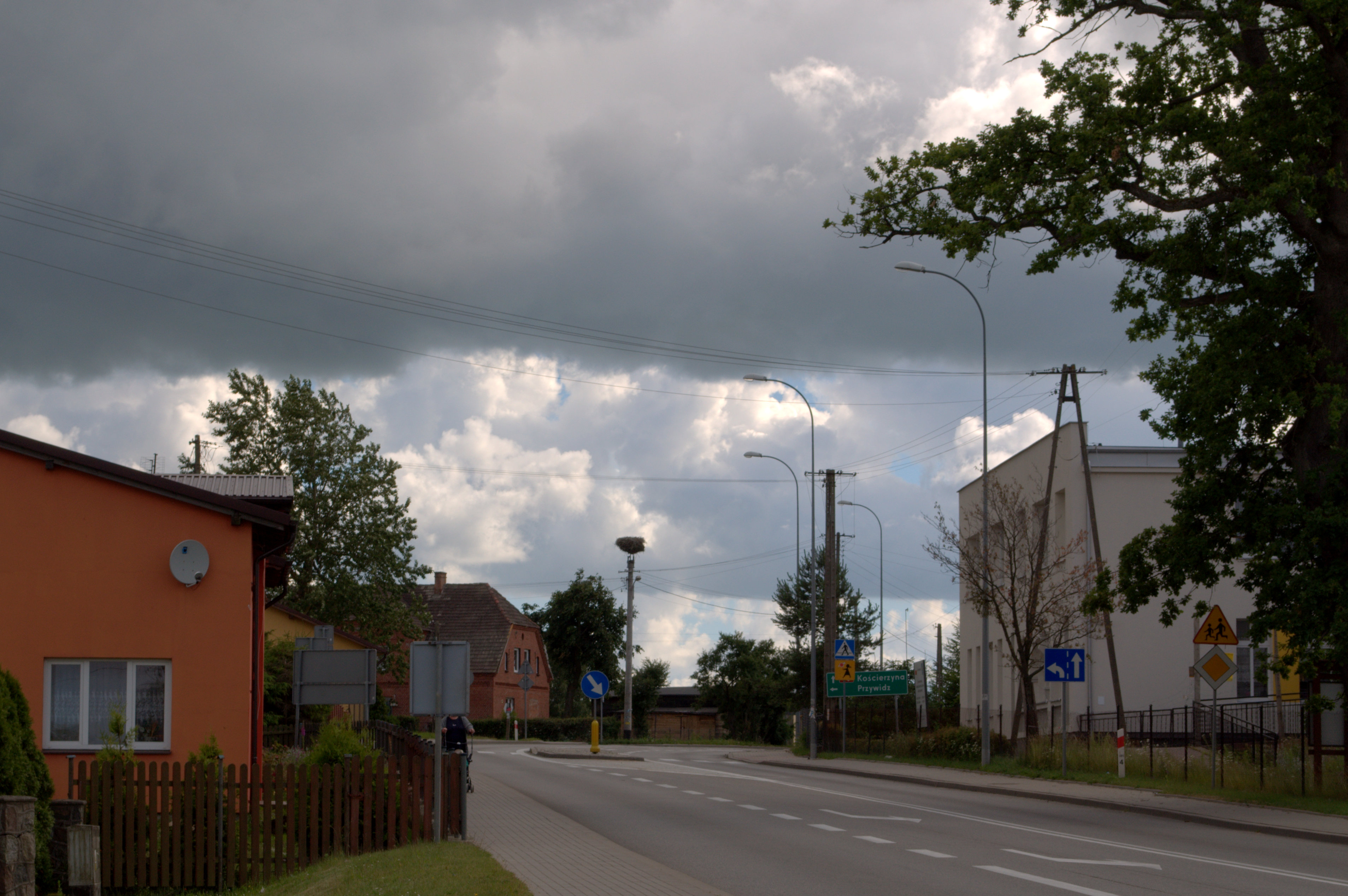

- Location within Poland
- Coordinates: 54°14′25″N 18°12′13″E
- Country: Poland
- Voivodeship: Pomeranian
- County: Kartuzy
- Gmina: Somonino
- Population: 600
- Time zone: UTC+1 (CET)
  - Summer (DST): UTC+2 (CEST)

Egiertowo [ɛɡʲɛrˈtɔvɔ] is a village in the administrative district of Gmina Somonino, within Kartuzy County, Pomeranian Voivodeship, in northern Poland.

During the German occupation of Poland (World War II), the Germans executed seven Poles from Egiertowo in the forest near Kartuzy and executed three Poles from Połęczyno in Egiertowo (see Nazi crimes against the Polish nation).
