= Stare Szabły =

- Village
- Location within Poland
- Coordinates: 53°01′49″N 21°54′07″E
- Country: Poland
- Voivodeship: Podlaskie
- County: Łomża
- Gmina: Śniadowo
- Population: 120

Stare Szabły [ˈstarɛ ˈʂabwɨ] is a village in the administrative district of Gmina Śniadowo, within Łomża County, Podlaskie Voivodeship, in north-eastern Poland.
