= Ramleje =

- Village
- Location within Poland
- Coordinates: 54°17′13″N 18°9′44″E
- Country: Poland
- Voivodeship: Pomeranian
- County: Kartuzy
- Gmina: Somonino
- Population: 328

Ramleje [ramˈlɛjɛ] is a village in the administrative district of Gmina Somonino, within Kartuzy County, Pomeranian Voivodeship, in northern Poland.

For details of the history of the region, see History of Pomerania.

== History ==
Ramleje is a very late settlement; until the middle of the 19th century, the area was covered by forests. The earliest references concern a forestry district in the Sztęgwałd sub-district (now Jodłowno in the gmina of Przywidz), and later a forester's lodge and forest settlement. In 1868, the land was granted as property to the residents, and a year later, the village consisted of 30 houses and was inhabited by 231 people. The village covered 325 hectares and included a Catholic school where, around 1885, a single teacher taught 84 children. At the end of 1892, the village was inhabited by 270 people, for 263 of whom Kashubian was their mother tongue, and for 7, German.

From 22 October 1906 to 31 May 1907, a school strike took place at the local elementary school, with children protesting against religious instruction in the German language. Among the strike participants, the surnames of the following children are known: M. Schwichtenberg and the Muchowski family. The strike was part of a much larger campaign of passive resistance against the Prussian school authorities.

In 1910, the village had 290 inhabitants, consisting of 285 Catholic Kashubians and 5 Evangelical Germans.
