= Osiek, Brodnica County =

Osiek
- Village
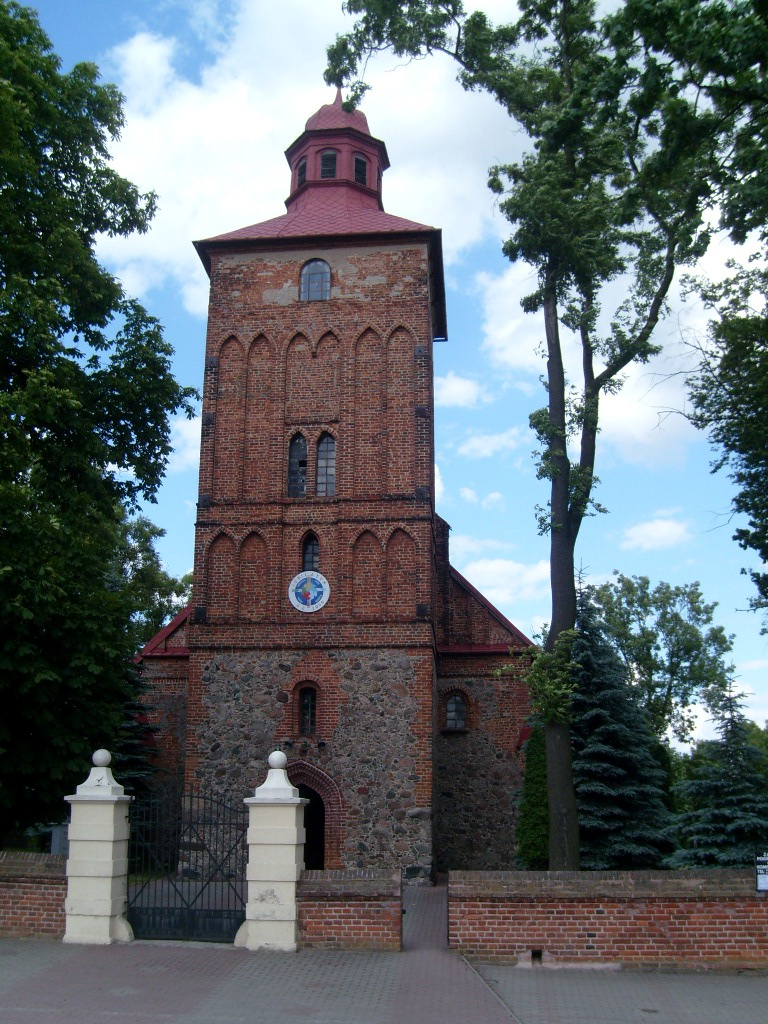
- Church in Osiek

- Location within Poland
- Coordinates: 53°10′N 19°23′E
- Country: Poland
- Voivodeship: Kuyavian-Pomeranian
- County: Brodnica
- Gmina: Osiek
- Population: 990

Osiek [ˈɔɕɛk] is a village in Brodnica County, Kuyavian-Pomeranian Voivodeship, in north-central Poland. It is the seat of the gmina (administrative district) called Gmina Osiek.
