= Grabowo, Łomża County =

Grabowo
- Village
- Location within Poland
- Coordinates: 53°00′30″N 22°01′00″E
- Country: Poland
- Voivodeship: Podlaskie
- County: Łomża
- Gmina: Śniadowo
- Website: http://www.grabowo.info/

Grabowo [ɡraˈbɔvɔ] is a village in the administrative district of Gmina Śniadowo, within Łomża County, Podlaskie Voivodeship, in north-eastern Poland.
