= Wszerzecz-Kolonia =

- Village
- Location within Poland
- Coordinates: 53°06′03″N 21°55′40″E
- Country: Poland
- Voivodeship: Podlaskie
- County: Łomża
- Gmina: Śniadowo

Wszerzecz-Kolonia [ˈfʂɛʐɛt͡ʂ kɔˈlɔɲa] is a village in the administrative district of Gmina Śniadowo, within Łomża County, Podlaskie Voivodeship, in north-eastern Poland.
