= Gmina Somonino =

Gmina Somonino Somonino Commune
- Gmina
- Interactive map of Gmina Somonino
- Coordinates (Somonino): 54°16′36″N 18°11′56″E
- Country: Poland
- Voivodeship: Pomeranian
- County: Kartuzy
- Seat: Somonino

Area
  - Total: 112.27 km^{2} (43.35 sq mi)

Population (2006)
  - Total: 9,214
  - Density: 82.07/km^{2} (212.6/sq mi)
- Website: https://www.somonino.pl

Gmina Somonino (Kashubian: Somònino) is a rural gmina (administrative district) in Kartuzy County, Pomeranian Voivodeship, in northern Poland. Its seat is the village of Somonino, which lies approximately 7 kilometres (4 mi) south of Kartuzy and 30 km (19 mi) west of the regional capital Gdańsk.

The gmina covers an area of 112.27 square kilometres (43.3 sq mi), and as of 2006 its total population is 9,214.

The gmina contains part of the protected area called Kashubian Landscape Park.

== Villages ==
Gmina Somonino contains the villages and settlements of Borcz, Borcz-Leśniczówka, Chylowa Huta, Dębowo, Egiertowo, Goręczyno, Graniczny Dwór, Hopowo, Jeknica, Kamela, Kaplica, Kolańska Huta, Koszowatka, Lisia Góra, Mały Dwór, Nowy Dwór, Ostowo, Ostrzyce, Patoka, Piotrowo, Połęczyno, Pstra Suka, Ramleje, Rąty, Rokitki, Rybaki, Sarni Dwór-Leśniczówka, Sarnówko, Sławki, Sławki Górne, Somonino, Stacja Wieżyca, Starkowa Huta, Stary Dwór, Trątkownica, Wyczechowo and Wyczechowo-Osady.

== Neighbouring gminas ==
Gmina Somonino is bordered by the gminas of Kartuzy, Kościerzyna, Nowa Karczma, Przywidz, Stężyca and Żukowo.
