= Mały Dwór, Pomeranian Voivodeship =

Mały Dwór
- Settlement
- Location within Poland
- Coordinates: 54°16′33″N 18°16′16″E
- Country: Poland
- Voivodeship: Pomeranian
- County: Kartuzy
- Gmina: Somonino

Mały Dwór [ˈmawɨ ˈdvur] is a settlement in the administrative district of Gmina Somonino, within Kartuzy County, Pomeranian Voivodeship, in northern Poland.

For details of the history of the region, see History of Pomerania.
