= Strzeszewo, Podlaskie Voivodeship =

Strzeszewo
- Village
- Location within Poland
- Coordinates: 52°59′13″N 21°59′22″E
- Country: Poland
- Voivodeship: Podlaskie
- County: Łomża
- Gmina: Śniadowo

Strzeszewo [stʂɛˈʂɛvɔ] is a village in the administrative district of Gmina Śniadowo, within Łomża County, Podlaskie Voivodeship, in north-eastern Poland.
