= Kujawa, Kuyavian-Pomeranian Voivodeship =

Kujawa
- Village
- Location within Poland
- Coordinates: 53°12′N 19°12′E
- Country: Poland
- Voivodeship: Kuyavian-Pomeranian
- County: Brodnica
- Gmina: Osiek

Kujawa [kuˈjava] is a village in the administrative district of Gmina Osiek, within Brodnica County, Kuyavian-Pomeranian Voivodeship, in north-central Poland.
