= Jemielite-Wypychy =

- Village
- Location within Poland
- Coordinates: 53°04′00″N 22°01′38″E
- Country: Poland
- Voivodeship: Podlaskie
- County: Łomża
- Gmina: Śniadowo

Jemielite-Wypychy [jɛmjɛˈlitɛ vɨˈpɨxɨ] is a village in the administrative district of Gmina Śniadowo, within Łomża County, Podlaskie Voivodeship, in north-eastern Poland.
