= Koszowatka =

- Settlement
- Location within Poland
- Coordinates: 54°15′10″N 18°8′27″E
- Country: Poland
- Voivodeship: Pomeranian
- County: Kartuzy
- Gmina: Somonino

Koszowatka [kɔʂɔˈvatka] is a settlement in the administrative district of Gmina Somonino, within Kartuzy County, Pomeranian Voivodeship, in northern Poland.

For details of the history of the region, see History of Pomerania.
