= Duchny Młode =

- Village
- Location within Poland
- Coordinates: 53°1′05″N 22°00′50″E
- Country: Poland
- Voivodeship: Podlaskie
- County: Łomża
- Gmina: Śniadowo

Duchny Młode [ˈduxnɨ ˈmwɔdɛ] is a village in the administrative district of Gmina Śniadowo, within Łomża County, Podlaskie Voivodeship, in north-eastern Poland.
