= Somonino =

- Village
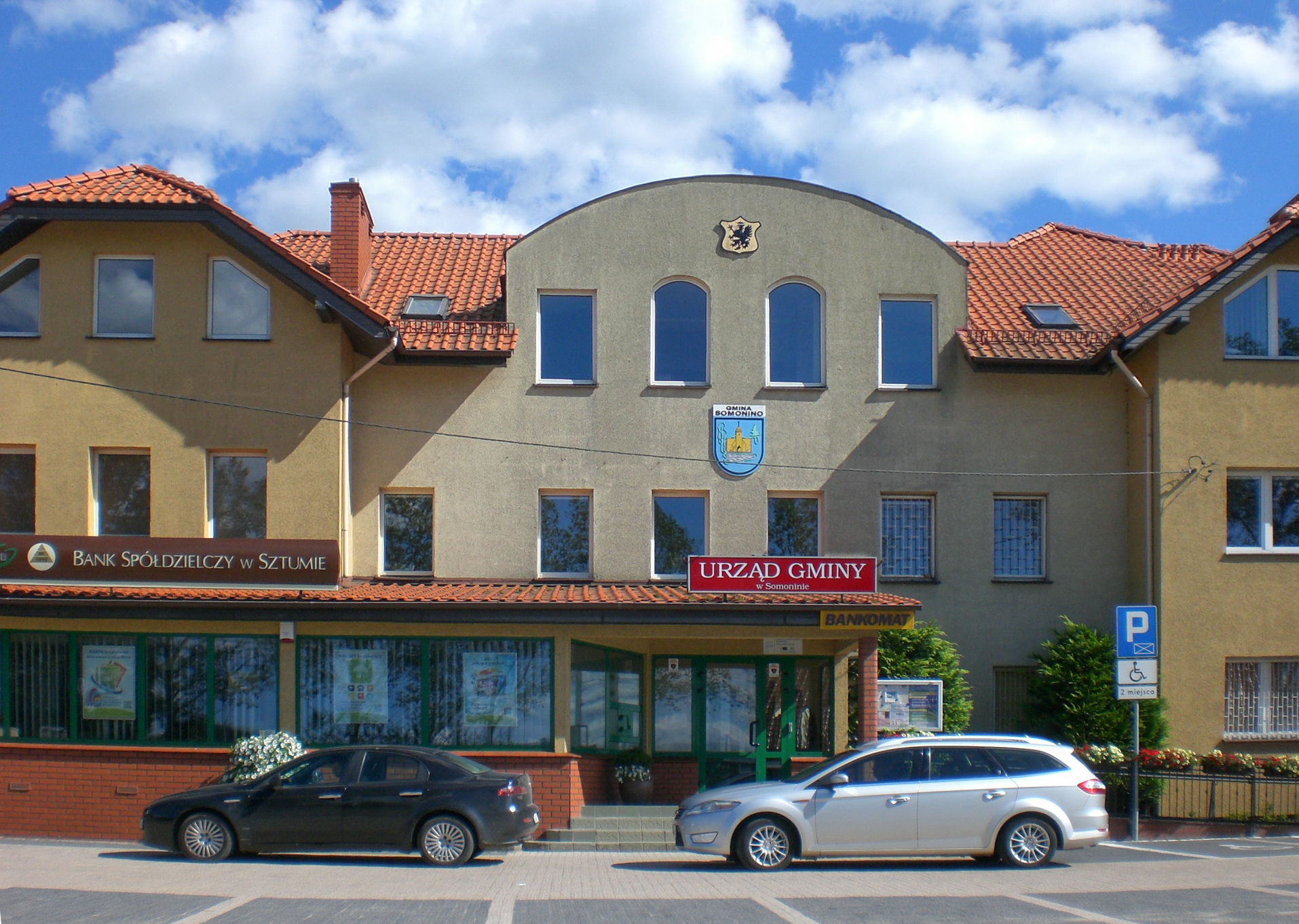
- Gmina Somonino administration office

- Location within Poland
- Coordinates: 54°16′36″N 18°11′56″E
- Country: Poland
- Voivodeship: Pomeranian
- County: Kartuzy
- Gmina: Somonino

Population
  - Total: 2,206
- Time zone: UTC+1 (CET)
  - Summer (DST): UTC+2 (CEST)
- Vehicle registration: GKA

Somonino [sɔmɔˈninɔ] is a village in Kartuzy County, Pomeranian Voivodeship, in northern Poland. It is the seat of the gmina (administrative district) called Gmina Somonino. It is located in the ethnocultural region of Kashubia in the historic region of Pomerania.

== History ==
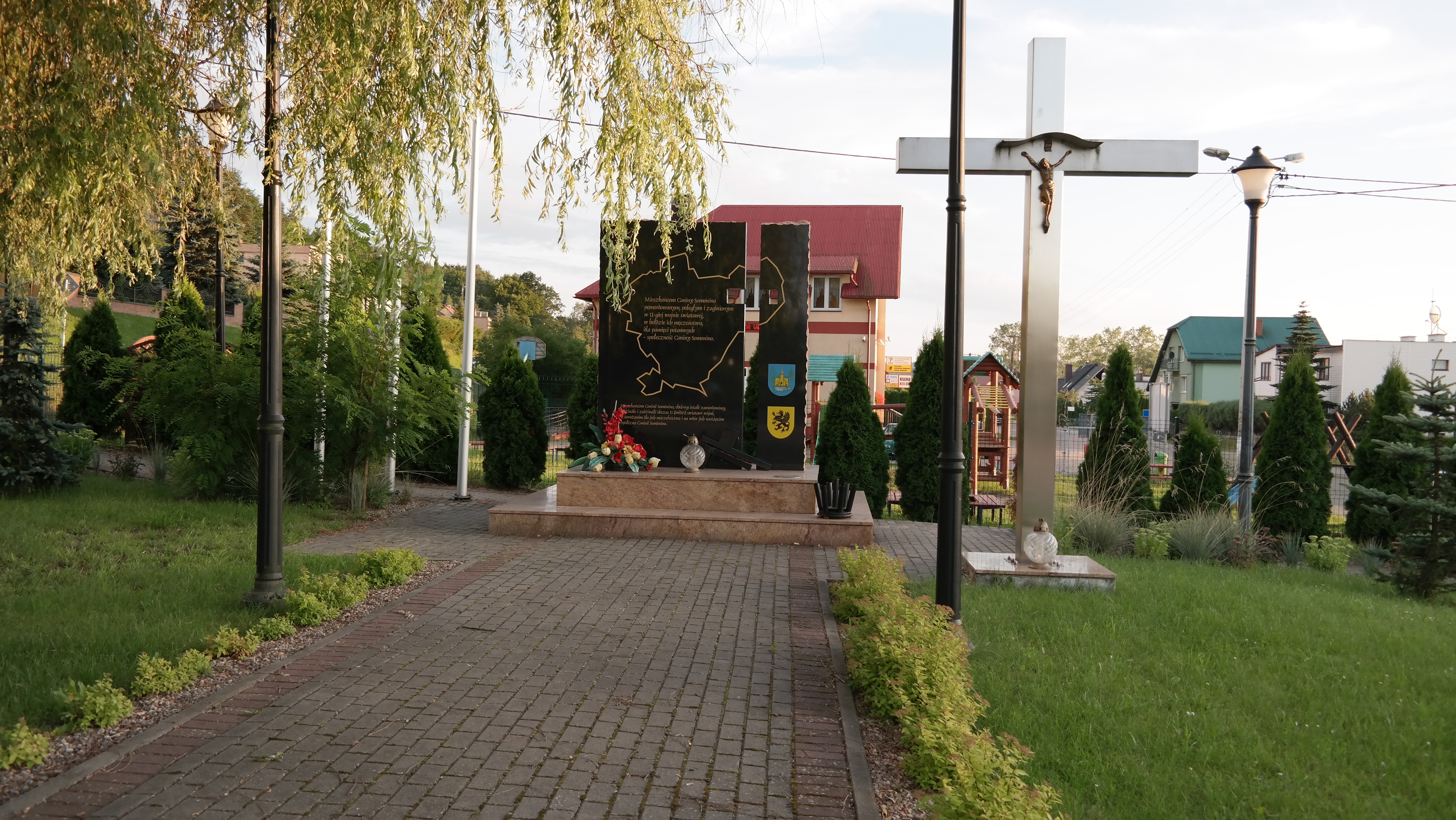
Monument to local inhabitants who were killed during World War II

During the German occupation of Poland (World War II), Somonino was one of the sites of executions of Poles, carried out by the Germans in 1939 as part of the Intelligenzaktion. Poles from Somonino were also among the victims of massacres of Poles, committed by the Germans in nearby Kaliska in October and November 1939, also as part of the Intelligenzaktion.
