= Jakać Borowa =

- Village
- Location within Poland
- Coordinates: 53°1′38″N 21°55′50″E
- Country: Poland
- Voivodeship: Podlaskie
- County: Łomża
- Gmina: Śniadowo
- Population: 20

Jakać Borowa [ˈjakat͡ɕ bɔˈrɔva] is a village in the administrative district of Gmina Śniadowo, within Łomża County, Podlaskie Voivodeship, in north-eastern Poland.
