= Trątkownica =

- Settlement
- Location within Poland
- Coordinates: 54°17′3″N 18°15′14″E
- Country: Poland
- Voivodeship: Pomeranian
- County: Kartuzy
- Gmina: Somonino
- Population: 19

Trątkownica [trɔntkɔvˈnit͡sa] is a settlement in the administrative district of Gmina Somonino, within Kartuzy County, Pomeranian Voivodeship, in northern Poland.

For details of the history of the region, see History of Pomerania.
