= Zalesie-Poczynki =

- Village
- Location within Poland
- Coordinates: 53°3′34″N 21°56′2″E
- Country: Poland
- Voivodeship: Podlaskie
- County: Łomża
- Gmina: Śniadowo
- Population: 35

Zalesie-Poczynki [zaˈlɛɕɛ pɔˈt͡ʂɨŋki] is a village in the administrative district of Gmina Śniadowo, within Łomża County, Podlaskie Voivodeship, in north-eastern Poland.
