= Stare Duchny =

- Village
- Location within Poland
- Coordinates: 53°01′28″N 22°01′26″E
- Country: Poland
- Voivodeship: Podlaskie
- County: Łomża
- Gmina: Śniadowo

Stare Duchny [ˈstarɛ ˈduxnɨ] is a village in the administrative district of Gmina Śniadowo, within Łomża County, Podlaskie Voivodeship, in north-eastern Poland.
