= Chylowa Huta =

- Settlement
- Location within Poland
- Coordinates: 54°11′52″N 18°10′25″E
- Country: Poland
- Voivodeship: Pomeranian
- County: Kartuzy
- Gmina: Somonino

Chylowa Huta [xɨˈlɔva ˈxuta] is a settlement in the administrative district of Gmina Somonino, within Kartuzy County, Pomeranian Voivodeship, in northern Poland.

For details of the history of the region, see History of Pomerania.
