= Uśnik-Dwór =

- Village
- Location within Poland
- Coordinates: 53°05′38″N 21°54′01″E
- Country: Poland
- Voivodeship: Podlaskie
- County: Łomża
- Gmina: Śniadowo
- Population: 100

Uśnik-Dwór [ˈuɕnik ˈdvur] is a village in the administrative district of Gmina Śniadowo, within Łomża County, Podlaskie Voivodeship, in north-eastern Poland.
