= Sierzputy Zagajne =

- Village
- Location within Poland
- Coordinates: 53°5′02″N 22°2′05″E
- Country: Poland
- Voivodeship: Podlaskie
- County: Łomża
- Gmina: Śniadowo
- Time zone: UTC+1 (CET)
  - Summer (DST): UTC+2 (CEST)

Sierzputy Zagajne [ɕɛʂˈputɨ zaˈɡai̯nɛ] is a village in the administrative district of Gmina Śniadowo, within Łomża County, Podlaskie Voivodeship, in north-eastern Poland.

== History ==
Three Polish citizens were murdered by Nazi Germany in the village during World War II.
