= Młynik, Podlaskie Voivodeship =

Młynik
- Village
- Location within Poland
- Coordinates: 53°06′57″N 21°54′23″E
- Country: Poland
- Voivodeship: Podlaskie
- County: Łomża
- Gmina: Śniadowo

Młynik [ˈmwɨnik] is a village in the administrative district of Gmina Śniadowo, within Łomża County, Podlaskie Voivodeship, in north-eastern Poland.
