= Stara Jakać =

- Village
- Location within Poland
- Coordinates: 53°00′39″N 21°56′06″E
- Country: Poland
- Voivodeship: Podlaskie
- County: Łomża
- Gmina: Śniadowo

Stara Jakać [ˈstara ˈjakat͡ɕ] is a village in the administrative district of Gmina Śniadowo, within Łomża County, Podlaskie Voivodeship, in North-Eastern Poland.
