= Jakać Młoda =

- Village
- Location within Poland
- Coordinates: 53°1′3″N 21°57′29″E
- Country: Poland
- Voivodeship: Podlaskie
- County: Łomża
- Gmina: Śniadowo

Jakać Młoda [ˈjakat͡ɕ ˈmwɔda] is a village in the administrative district of Gmina Śniadowo, within Łomża County, Podlaskie Voivodeship, in north-eastern Poland.
