= Obórki, Kuyavian-Pomeranian Voivodeship =

Obórki
- Village
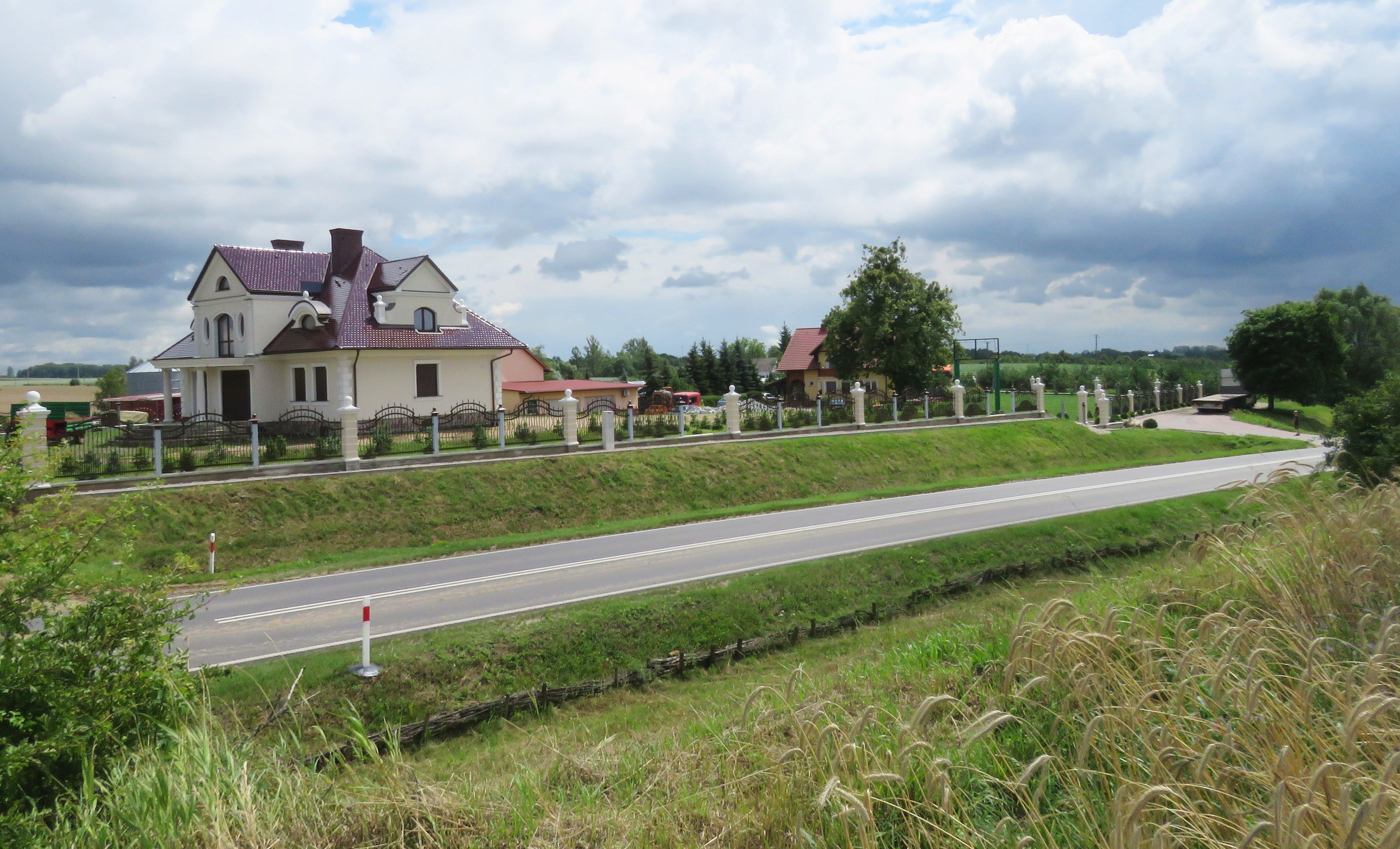

- Location within Poland
- Coordinates: 53°09′28″N 19°23′09″E
- Country: Poland
- Voivodeship: Kuyavian-Pomeranian
- County: Brodnica
- Gmina: Osiek

Obórki [ɔˈburki] is a village in the administrative district of Gmina Osiek, within Brodnica County, Kuyavian-Pomeranian Voivodeship, in north-central Poland.
