= Kamela, Poland =

Kamela
- Village
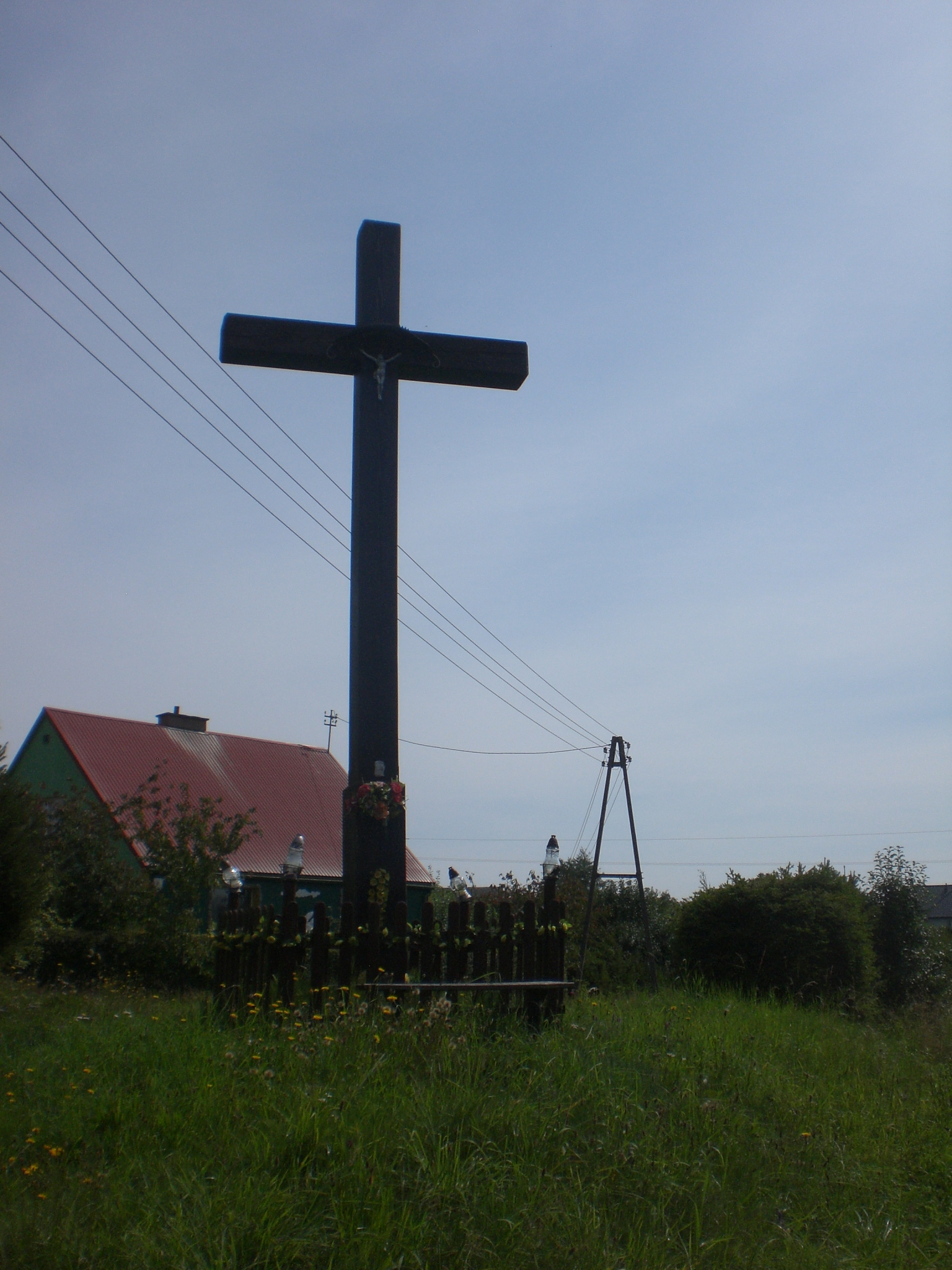
- Wayside cross in Kamela

- Location within Poland
- Coordinates: 54°13′45″N 18°14′3″E
- Country: Poland
- Voivodeship: Pomeranian
- County: Kartuzy
- Gmina: Somonino
- Population: 272
- Time zone: UTC+1 (CET)
  - Summer (DST): UTC+2 (CEST)
- Vehicle registration: GKA

Kamela is a village in the administrative district of Gmina Somonino, within Kartuzy County, Pomeranian Voivodeship, in northern Poland. It is located in the ethnocultural region of Kashubia in the historic region of Pomerania.

== History ==
The village was founded after 1600.

During the German occupation of Poland (World War II), in 1939, some Poles from Kamela were among the victims of a massacre committed by the Germans in nearby Kaliska as part of the genocidal Intelligenzaktion campaign.
