= Ratowo-Piotrowo =

- Village
- Location within Poland
- Coordinates: 53°03′43″N 22°00′03″E
- Country: Poland
- Voivodeship: Podlaskie
- County: Łomża
- Gmina: Śniadowo

Ratowo-Piotrowo [raˈtɔvɔ pjɔˈtrɔvɔ] is a village in the administrative district of Gmina Śniadowo, within Łomża County, Podlaskie Voivodeship, in north-eastern Poland.
