= Piotrowo, Kartuzy County =

Piotrowo
- Village
- Location within Poland
- Coordinates: 54°11′38″N 18°8′39″E
- Country: Poland
- Voivodeship: Pomeranian
- County: Kartuzy
- Gmina: Somonino

Piotrowo [pjɔˈtrɔvɔ] is a village in the administrative district of Gmina Somonino, within Kartuzy County, Pomeranian Voivodeship, in northern Poland.

For details of the history of the region, see History of Pomerania.
