= Bagno, Łomża County =

Bagno
- Village
- Location within Poland
- Coordinates: 53°01′53″N 21°58′10″E
- Country: Poland
- Voivodeship: Podlaskie
- County: Łomża
- Gmina: Śniadowo

Bagno [ˈbaɡnɔ] is a village in the administrative district of Gmina Śniadowo, within Łomża County, Podlaskie Voivodeship, in north-eastern Poland.
