= Kaplica, Pomeranian Voivodeship =

Kaplica
- Village
- Location within Poland
- Coordinates: 54°12′44″N 18°10′45″E
- Country: Poland
- Voivodeship: Pomeranian
- County: Kartuzy
- Gmina: Somonino
- Population: 275

Kaplica [kaˈplit͡sa] is a village in the administrative district of Gmina Somonino, within Kartuzy County, Pomeranian Voivodeship, in northern Poland.

For details of the history of the region, see History of Pomerania.
