= Żebry =

Żebry may refer to the following places:

- Żebry, Grajewo County in Podlaskie Voivodeship (north-east Poland)
- Żebry, Kolno County in Podlaskie Voivodeship (north-east Poland)
- Żebry, Łomża County in Podlaskie Voivodeship (north-east Poland)
