= Kolańska Huta =

- Settlement
- Location within Poland
- Coordinates: 54°14′33″N 18°7′29″E
- Country: Poland
- Voivodeship: Pomeranian
- County: Kartuzy
- Gmina: Somonino

Kolańska Huta [kɔˈlaɲska ˈxuta] is a settlement in the administrative district of Gmina Somonino, within Kartuzy County, Pomeranian Voivodeship, in northern Poland.

For details of the history of the region, see History of Pomerania.
