= Sierzputy-Marki =

- Village
- Location within Poland
- Coordinates: 53°4′2″N 22°2′25″E
- Country: Poland
- Voivodeship: Podlaskie
- County: Łomża
- Gmina: Śniadowo

Sierzputy-Marki [ɕɛʂˈputɨ ˈmarki] is a village in the administrative district of Gmina Śniadowo, within Łomża County, Podlaskie Voivodeship, in north-eastern Poland.
