= Kretki Duże =

- Village
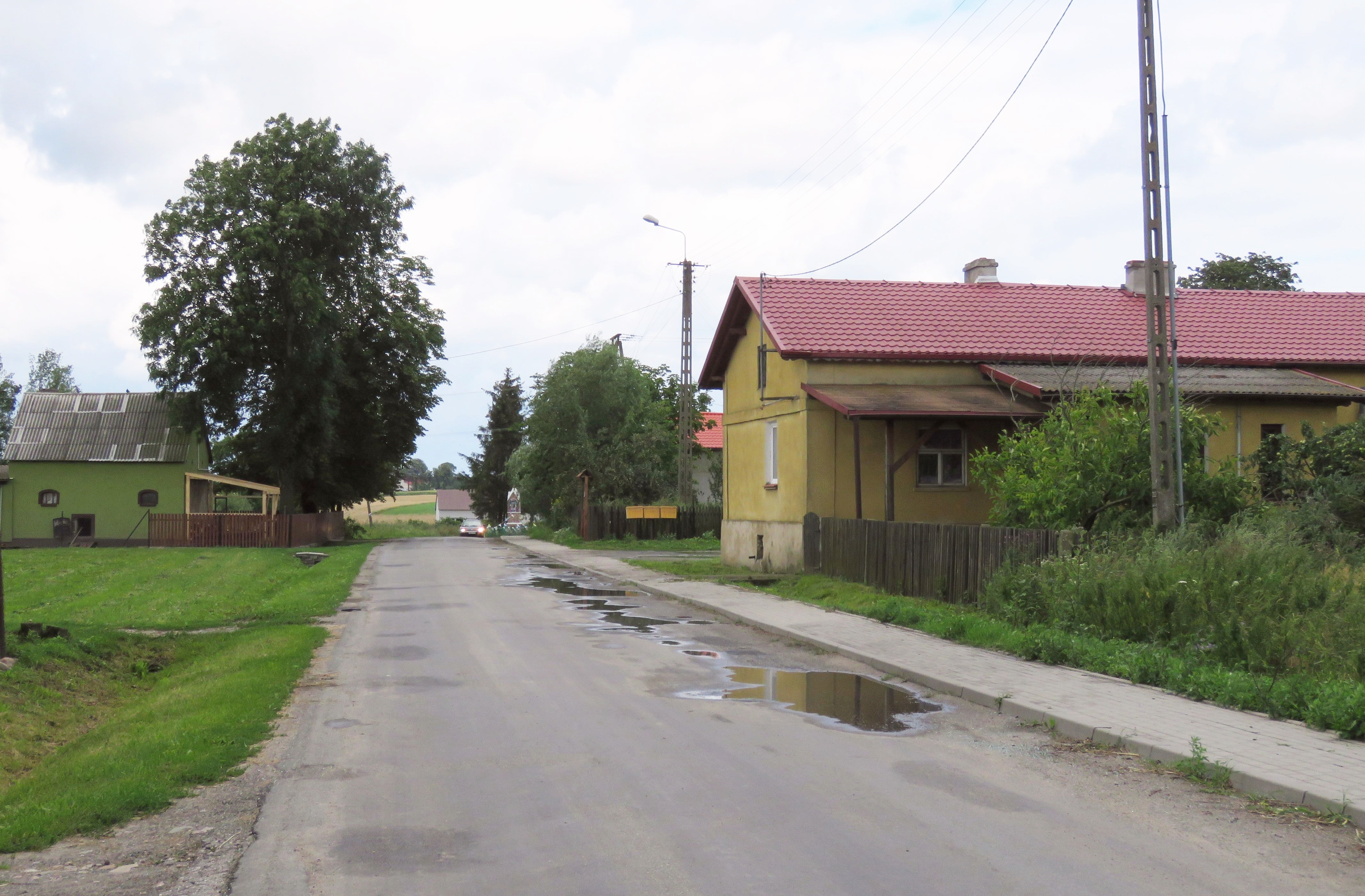

- Location within Poland
- Coordinates: 53°11′N 19°26′E
- Country: Poland
- Voivodeship: Kuyavian-Pomeranian
- County: Brodnica
- Gmina: Osiek
- Population: 158

Kretki Duże [ˈkrɛtki ˈduʐɛ] is a village in the administrative district of Gmina Osiek, within Brodnica County, Kuyavian-Pomeranian Voivodeship, in north-central Poland.
