= Stara Jastrząbka, Podlaskie Voivodeship =

Stara Jastrząbka
- Village
- Location within Poland
- Coordinates: 52°59′39″N 21°59′15″E
- Country: Poland
- Voivodeship: Podlaskie
- County: Łomża
- Gmina: Śniadowo

Stara Jastrząbka [ˈstara jasˈtʂɔmpka] is a village in the administrative district of Gmina Śniadowo, within Łomża County, Podlaskie Voivodeship, in north-eastern Poland.
