= Strzygi, Brodnica County =

Strzygi
- Village
- Location within Poland
- Coordinates: 53°7′19″N 19°23′4″E
- Country: Poland
- Voivodeship: Kuyavian-Pomeranian
- County: Brodnica
- Gmina: Osiek

Strzygi [ˈstʂɨɡi] is a village in the administrative district of Gmina Osiek, within Brodnica County, Kuyavian-Pomeranian Voivodeship, in north-central Poland.

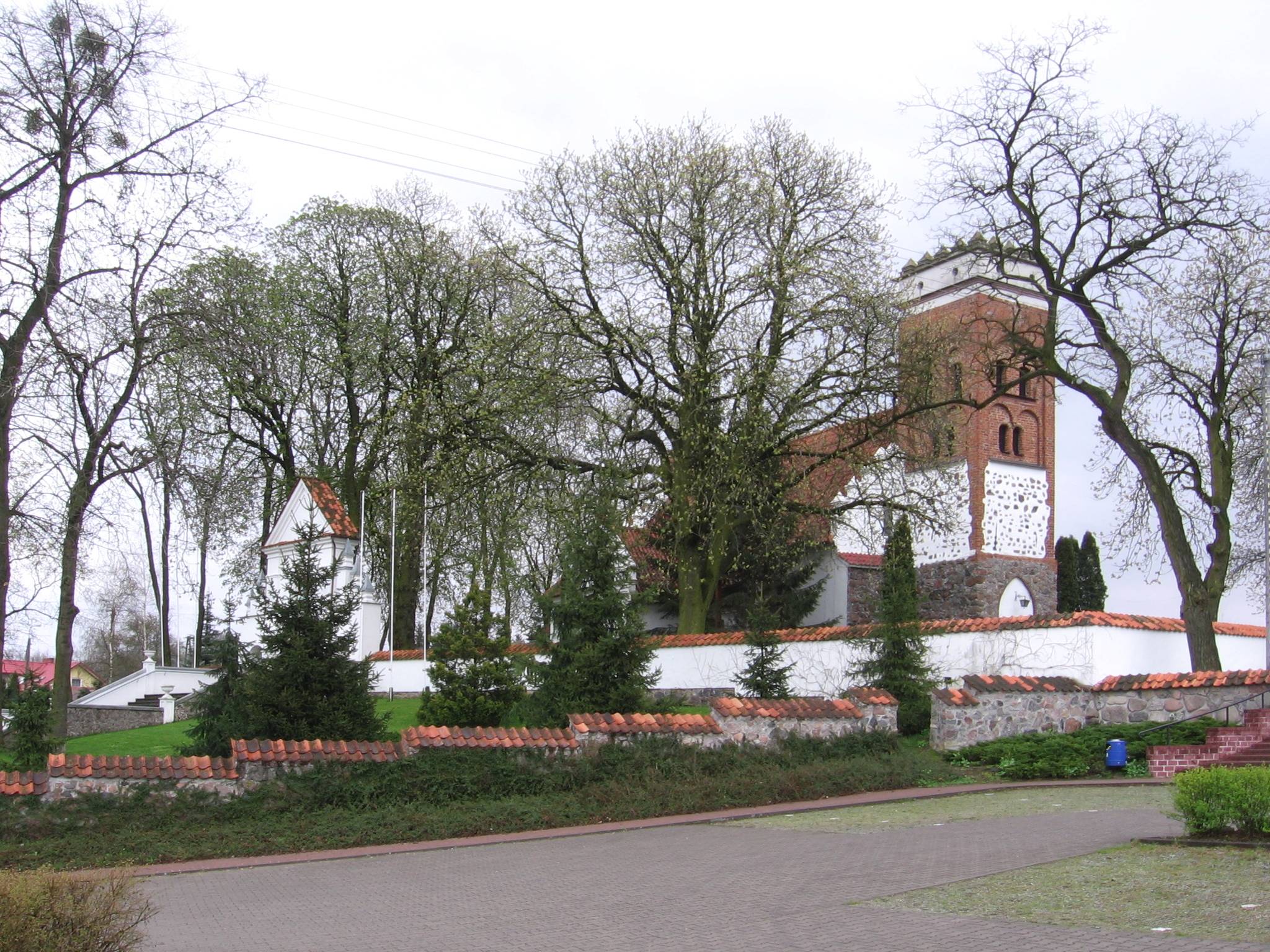
Strzygi, church
