= Marcin Żebrowski =

Polish journalist and television presenter

- Born: Gdynia, Poland
- Occupation: Journalist
- Notable credit(s): You Get Up and You Know

Marcin Żebrowski is a Polish journalist and television presenter, best known for presenting TVN24 morning show You Get Up and You Know.

== Career ==
Żebrowski began working for TVN24 in 2007, serving as a reporter in Gdańsk. On 8 March 2008 he debuted as the news presenter. In 2009 he became the new co-host of weekend editions of TVN24 newscast Poland and The World, creating a duet with Dagmara Kaczmarek-Szałkow. He was presenting it until December 2010, as in 2011 he was announced as the new presenter of morning show You Get Up and You Know, where he is on air from Friday to Sunday, joined by Joanna Kryńska, who presents the news.

Before his work in TVN24, Żebrowski was journalist of a catholic magazine Gość Niedzielny.
