= Dębowo, Kartuzy County =

Dębowo
- Settlement
- Location within Poland
- Coordinates: 54°14′19″N 18°9′54″E
- Country: Poland
- Voivodeship: Pomeranian
- County: Kartuzy
- Gmina: Somonino

Dębowo [dɛmˈbɔvɔ] is a settlement in the administrative district of Gmina Somonino, within Kartuzy County, Pomeranian Voivodeship, in northern Poland.

For details of the history of the region, see History of Pomerania.
