= Wyczechowo =

- Village
- Location within Poland
- Coordinates: 54°16′36″N 18°14′49″E
- Country: Poland
- Voivodeship: Pomeranian
- County: Kartuzy
- Gmina: Somonino
- Population: 392

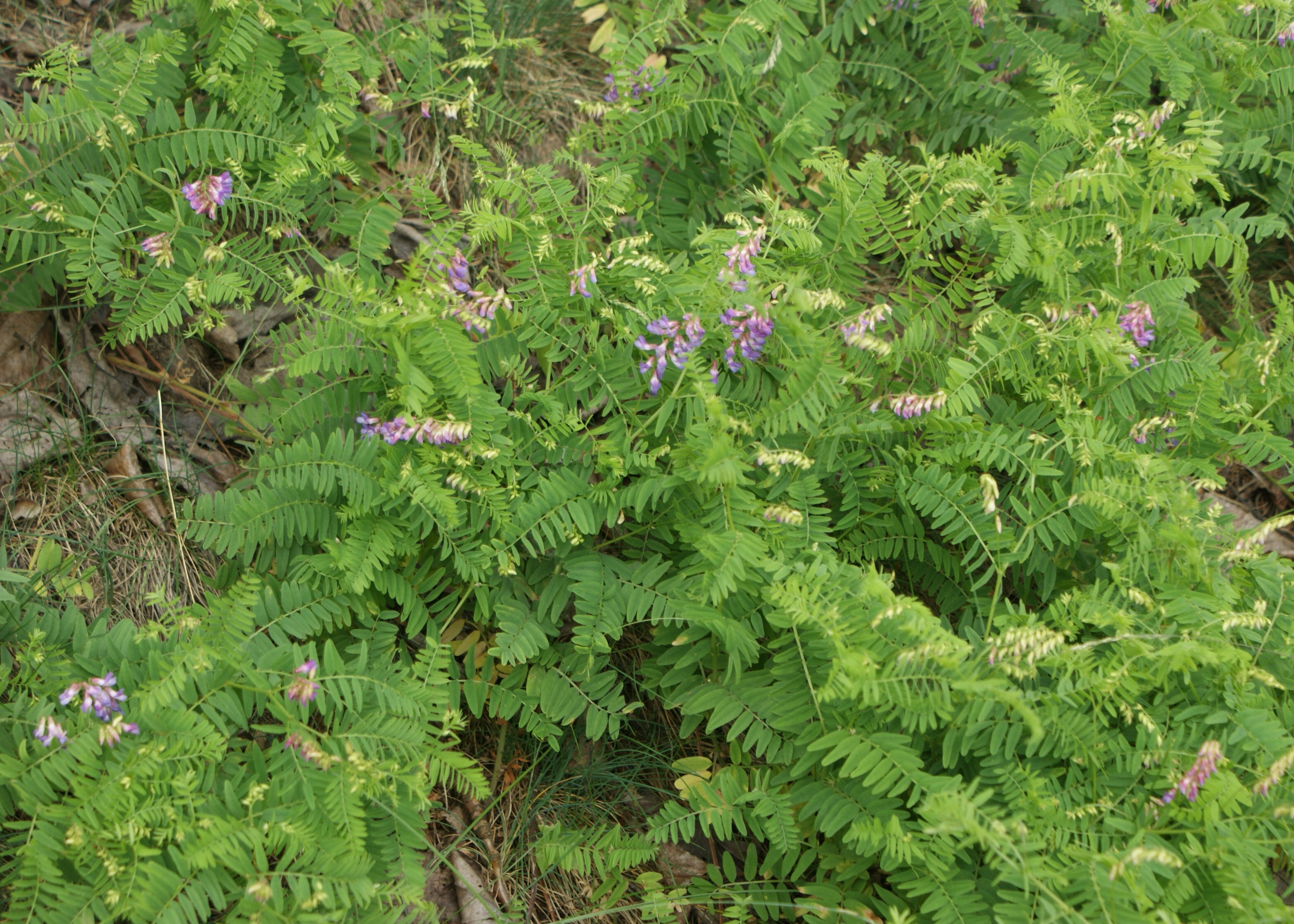
Kashubian vetch in Wyczechowo in 2013

Wyczechowo [vɨt͡ʂɛˈxɔvɔ] is a village in the administrative district of Gmina Somonino, within Kartuzy County, Pomeranian Voivodeship, in northern Poland.

For details of the history of the region, see History of Pomerania.
