= Mężenin, Łomża County =

Mężenin
- Village
- Location within Poland
- Coordinates: 53°2′33″N 22°1′32″E
- Country: Poland
- Voivodeship: Podlaskie
- County: Łomża
- Gmina: Śniadowo

Mężenin [mɛ̃ˈʐɛnin] is a village in the administrative district of Gmina Śniadowo, within Łomża County, Podlaskie Voivodeship, in north-eastern Poland.
