= Rokitki, Kartuzy County =

Rokitki
- Settlement
- Location within Poland
- Coordinates: 54°16′9″N 18°8′32″E
- Country: Poland
- Voivodeship: Pomeranian
- County: Kartuzy
- Gmina: Somonino

Rokitki [rɔˈkitki] is a settlement in the administrative district of Gmina Somonino, within Kartuzy County, Pomeranian Voivodeship, in northern Poland.

== See also ==
- History of Pomerania
