= Lisia Góra, Kartuzy County =

Lisia Góra
- Settlement
- Location within Poland
- Coordinates: 54°14′10″N 18°14′59″E
- Country: Poland
- Voivodeship: Pomeranian
- County: Kartuzy
- Gmina: Somonino

Lisia Góra [ˈliɕa ˈɡura] is a settlement in the administrative district of Gmina Somonino, within Kartuzy County, Pomeranian Voivodeship, in northern Poland.

For details of the history of the region, see History of Pomerania.
