= Dębowo, Łomża County =

Dębowo
- Village
- Location within Poland
- Coordinates: 53°4′0″N 21°54′11″E
- Country: Poland
- Voivodeship: Podlaskie
- County: Łomża
- Gmina: Śniadowo

Dębowo [dɛmˈbɔvɔ] is a village in the administrative district of Gmina Śniadowo, within Łomża County, Podlaskie Voivodeship, in north-eastern Poland.
