= Dębowo, Brodnica County =

Dębowo
- Village
- Location within Poland
- Coordinates: 53°08′34″N 19°22′52″E
- Country: Poland
- Voivodeship: Kuyavian-Pomeranian
- County: Brodnica
- Gmina: Osiek

Dębowo ([dɛmˈbɔvɔ]; German: Dembowo, 1942–45 Eichried) is a village in the administrative district of Gmina Osiek, within Brodnica County, Kuyavian-Pomeranian Voivodeship, in north-central Poland.
