= Śniadowo-Stara Stacja =

- Village
- Location within Poland
- Coordinates: 53°02′47″N 22°01′18″E
- Country: Poland
- Voivodeship: Podlaskie
- County: Łomża
- Gmina: Śniadowo

Śniadowo-Stara Stacja [ɕɲaˈdɔvɔ ˈstara ˈstat͡sja] is a village in the administrative district of Gmina Śniadowo, within Łomża County, Podlaskie Voivodeship, in north-eastern Poland.
