= Jeziórki =

- Village
- Location within Poland
- Coordinates: 53°11′03″N 19°22′49″E
- Country: Poland
- Voivodeship: Kuyavian-Pomeranian
- County: Brodnica
- Gmina: Osiek

Jeziórki [jɛˈʑurki] is a village in the administrative district of Gmina Osiek, within Brodnica County, Kuyavian-Pomeranian Voivodeship, in north-central Poland.
