= Żebry, Łomża County =

Village in Podlaskie Voivodeship, Poland

Żebry
- Village
- Location within Poland
- Coordinates: 53°5′31″N 21°59′1″E
- Country: Poland
- Voivodeship: Podlaskie
- County: Łomża
- Gmina: Śniadowo

Żebry [ˈʐɛbrɨ] is a village in the administrative district of Gmina Śniadowo, within Łomża County, Podlaskie Voivodeship, in north-eastern Poland.
