= Jakać =

River in Poland

Location
- Country: Poland

Physical characteristics
- Mouth
  - location: Ruż
  - coordinates: 53°00′32″N 21°52′56″E

Basin features
- Progression: Ruż→ Narew→ Vistula→ Baltic Sea

Jakać is a river in Poland, a tributary of the Ruż near Szabły Młode.
