= Śniadowo, Podlaskie Voivodeship =

Śniadowo
- Village
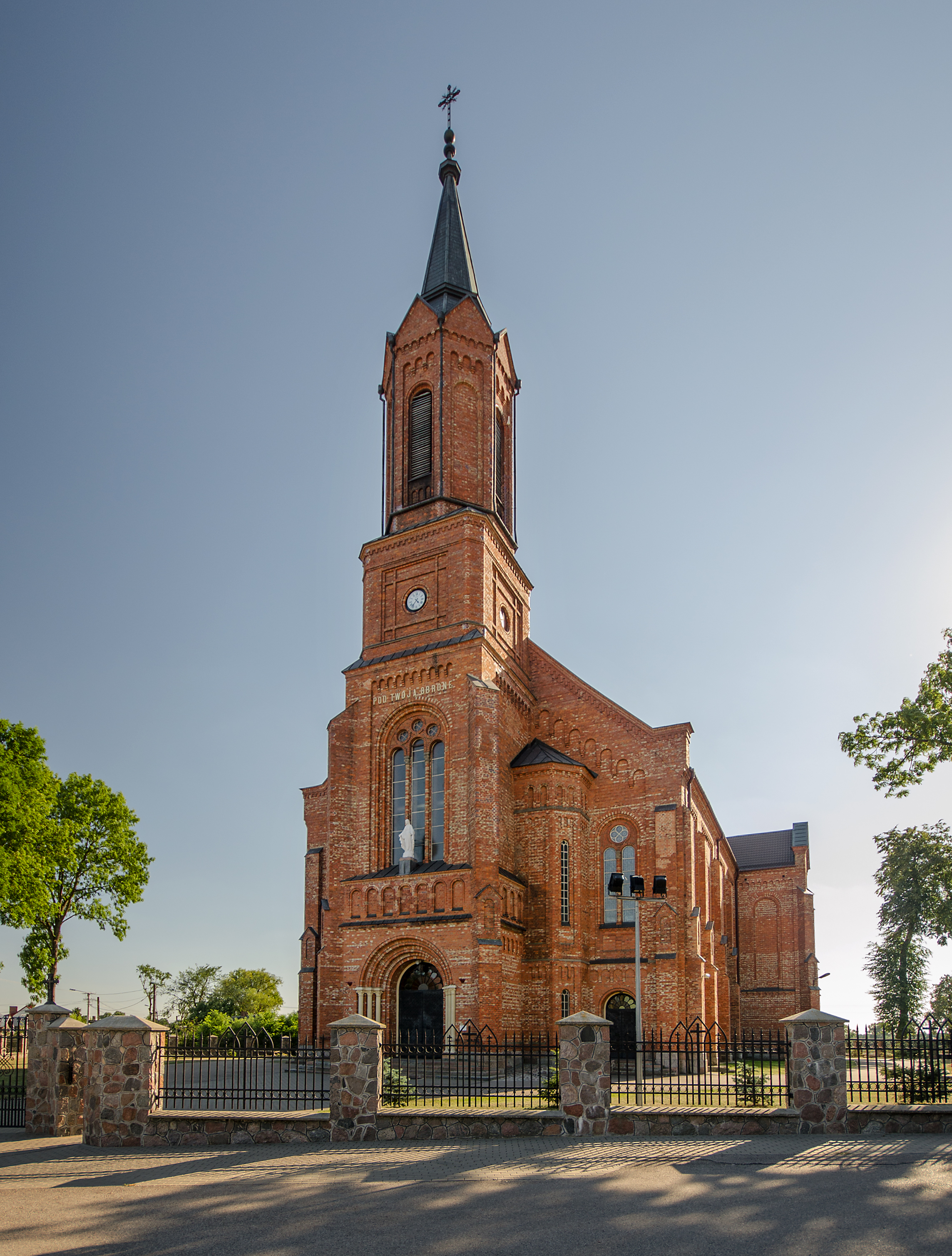
- Church of the Assumption of the Virgin Mary

- Location within Poland
- Coordinates: 53°2′N 21°59′E
- Country: Poland
- Voivodeship: Podlaskie
- County: Łomża
- Gmina: Śniadowo
- Highest elevation: 130 m (430 ft)
- Lowest elevation: 120 m (390 ft)

Population
  - Total: 1,500
- Website: http://sniadowo.powiatlomzynski.pl/

Śniadowo [ɕɲaˈdɔvɔ] is a village in Łomża County, Podlaskie Voivodeship, in north-eastern Poland. It is the seat of the gmina (administrative district) called Gmina Śniadowo.

== Transport ==
The S61 expressway passes Śniadowo to the west. Exit 3 of the expressway provides access to the town.

Until the late 1980s, the village used to be a local railroad junction, located along the Ostrołęka - Łapy line. In Śniadowo, a 15-kilometer connection to Łomża stemmed. All these lines are now closed. Although work is currently underway to modernise and restore line no 49 between Śniadowo and Łomża by June 2026.
