= Dorley =

Dorley is a surname. Notable people with the surname include:

- August Dorley (1842–1867), German soldier who fought in the American Civil War
- Oscar Dorley (born 1998), Liberian footballer

== Arts, entertainment, and media ==
- The Sisters of Dorley book series, set around a college building named after someone with the surname Dorley.

== See also ==
- Doley
- Dooley
- Dorle
- Dorsey (surname)
