= Dorsey (surname) =

Dorsey is a surname. Notable people with the surname include:

- Anna Hanson Dorsey (1815–1896), American novelist
- Arnold George Dorsey (born 1936), birth name of British-American singer Engelbert Humperdinck
- Candas Jane Dorsey (born 1952), Canadian poet and science fiction novelist
- Clement Dorsey (1778–1848), American politician
- Dana A. Dorsey (1872–1940), American businessman and philanthropist
- Dean Dorsey (born 1957), Canadian football player
- Decatur Dorsey (1836–1891), American Civil War hero
- Ella Loraine Dorsey (1853–1935), American author, journalist, translator
- Eric Dorsey (born 1964), American football player
- Frank Joseph Gerard Dorsey (1891–1949), American politician and soldier
- George Dorsey (disambiguation), multiple people
- Glenn Dorsey (born 1985), American football
- Hugh Manson Dorsey (1871–1948), American politician
- Ida Dorsey (1866–1918), American madam
- Issan Dorsey (1933–1990), American zen monk
- Jack Dorsey (born 1976), American co-founder and CEO of Twitter and Square, Inc.
- James Owen Dorsey (1848–1895), American ethnologist, linguist, and missionary
- Jim Dorsey (disambiguation), multiple people
- Joey Dorsey (born 1983), American basketball player
- John Dorsey (disambiguation), multiple people
- Julia Dorsey (1850-1919), African-American suffragist
- Julie Dorsey, American computer scientist
- Ken Dorsey (born 1981), American football player
- Khalil Dorsey (born 1998), American football player
- Lee Dorsey (1924–1986), American pop singer
- Leon Dorsey (1975–2008), American serial killer
- Leon Lee Dorsey (born 1958), American jazz bassist
- Mattie Dorsey (dates unknown), American classic female blues singer
- Michael Dorsey (disambiguation), multiple people
- Mike Dorsey (1930–2014), English-Australian actor
- Nicole Dorsey, Canadian director and screenwriter
- Norbert Dorsey (1929–2013), American Roman Catholic bishop
- Ryan Dorsey (born 1983), American actor
- Sarah Dorsey (1829–1879), American author and benefactor of Jefferson Davis
- Stephen Wallace Dorsey (1842–1916), American politician
- Thomas Dorsey (disambiguation), multiple people
- Tim Dorsey (1961–2023), American crime novelist
- Tommy Dorsey (1905–1956), American jazz trombonist
- Troy Dorsey (born 1962), American boxer and kickboxer
- Tyler Dorsey (born 1996), Greek–American basketball player in the Israeli Basketball Premier League
- Walter Dorsey (1771–1823), justice of the Maryland Court of Appeals
- William Dorsey (1813–1878), English-Australian medical practitioner
- Yvonne Dorsey-Colomb (born 1952), American politician from Louisiana
