= Dorsey =

Dorsey may refer to:

== People ==
- Dorsey (surname)
- Dorsey (given name)

== Places ==
=== United States ===
- Dorsey, Illinois, an unincorporated community
- Dorsey, Maryland, an unincorporated community
  - Dorsey station, a passenger rail station
- Dorsey, Michigan
- Dorsey, Mississippi, an unincorporated community
- Dorsey, Nebraska, an unincorporated community

=== Elsewhere ===
- Dorsey, County Armagh, a village in Northern Ireland
- Dorsey Island, Antarctica

== Other uses ==
- USS Dorsey (DD-117), a destroyer which served in both world wars
- Dorsey Road, part of Maryland Route 103
- Susan Miller Dorsey High School, high school in Baldwin Hills/Crenshaw, Los Angeles, California
