= Doley =

Doley is a surname. Notable people with the surname include:

- Clayton Doley (born 1974), Australian musician
- Harold Doley (born 1947), American businessman
- Jogeswar Doley, Indian politician
- Lachy Doley (born 1978), Australian musician
- Lalit Kumar Doley, Indian politician
- Naba Kumar Doley, Indian politician

== See also ==
- Shakuntala Doley Gamlin, Indian civil servant
- Doły
