= 1929 Chicago aldermanic election =

- February 26 and April 2, 1929

All 50 seats in the Chicago City Council 26 seats needed for a majority
	Majority party	Minority party
Party	Republican	Democratic
Seats before	20	30
Seats won	27	23
Seat change	▲7	▼7
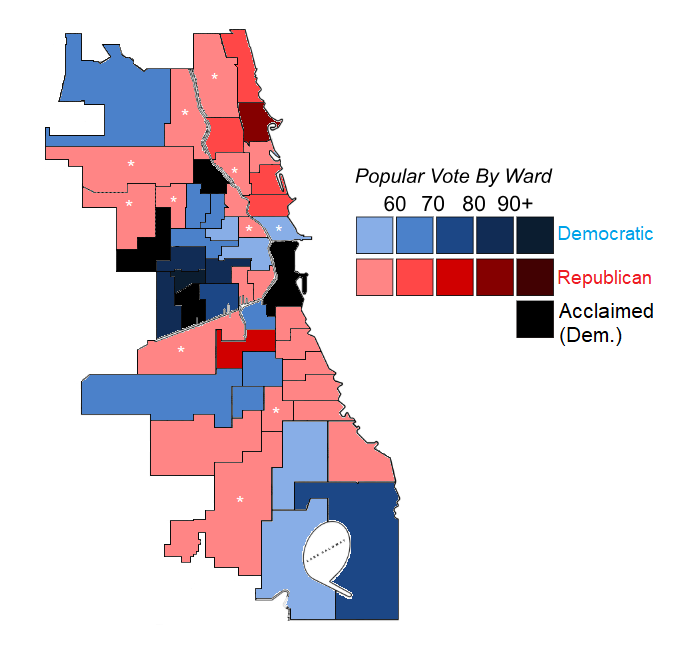
- Results by ward. The map shows the winning candidate's party affiliations even though aldermen ran as nonpartisans. A white asterisk (*) means the results for that ward were decided in a runoff vote.

The 1929 Chicago aldermanic election was held on February 26, 1929, with a runoff on April 2, to elect the 50 members of the Chicago City Council. The elections were non-partisan. Held in the middle of mayor William Hale Thompson's term, it would be the penultimate midterm election; four-year terms for aldermen were adopted in 1935, coinciding with the mayoral election that year.

All told, despite the non-partisan nature of the elections, candidates affiliated with the Republican Party won 27 seats and those affiliated with the Democratic Party won 23. 11 seats were decided by means of a runoff election, and a Republican candidate won all but one of those elections. Six incumbent aldermen were defeated in the first round, and an additional four fell in the runoffs, all by Republican candidates. Four aldermen, all Democratic, were returned without opposition.

== Issues and endorsements ==
The main issue of the elections was the influence of Mayor Thompson over the City Government and individual aldermen. Senior US Senator and former Governor Charles Deneen fronted the main slate of anti-Thompson candidates. Many reformers had hoped and even proclaimed that the election would "wipe...Thompson off the political map." The reform-minded Chicago Tribune and Municipal Voter's League endorsed candidates based on their perceived independence from Thompson.

The elections were held on a backdrop of violence throughout the city. In particular the race for the so-called "Bloody Twentieth" ward had been marked by the murder in April 1928 of African-American reform candidate for committeeman Octavius Granady during the Pineapple Primary. The Daily Chronicle in DeKalb reported that "Another surprise of the election - for the police at least - was that no one was murdered, kidnapped, or slugged," although it attributed such lack of violence to the heavy patrol of polling places by police officers that compelled Police Commissioner William Russell to set aside his investigation of the recent Saint Valentine's Day Massacre. It was also subject to some disputes in electoral law, with such sitting aldermen as Sheldon Govier of the 9th ward and Joseph McDonough of the 13th raising accusations of fraudulent petitions against many of their opponents given the 40% increase in the number of candidates from the 1927 elections and some aldermen disputing a filing deadline that sitting aldermen Coyle, Haffa, and Hoellen had missed.

The Daily Chronicle asserted that four of the six aldermen defeated in the first round had been Thompson supporters. Nevertheless, the election was generally considered a failure for the reformers. Many of Thompson's closest allies, including his former African-American floor leader Louis B. Anderson of the 2nd Ward, retained their seats. Particularly devastating was the loss of 20th ward incumbent A.J. Prignano, whom the Municipal Voter's League had extolled as "the best alderman [the] ward has had in many years," to William V. Pacelli, a candidate fronted by the Ellers, who were implicated in Granady's murder. Furthermore, of the nine candidates endorsed by the Tribune and Municipal Voter's League leading up to the runoff elections (not including contests where neither or both candidates were endorsed), only Frank Konkowski of the 31st Ward won his contest. Ultimately, Thompson's rule over the city would continue unabated until the 1931 elections.

== Results ==
=== 1st Ward ===
First Ward
Party	Candidate	Votes	%
Democratic	John J. Coughlin, incumbent	4,510	100.00
Majority		4,510	100.00
Democratic hold

=== 2nd Ward ===
Second Ward
Party	Candidate	Votes	%
Republican	Louis B. Anderson, incumbent	7,226	55.85
Republican	Earl B. Dickerson	4,128	31.90
Democratic	Augustus L. Williams	922	7.13
Republican	James G. Cotter	663	5.12
Majority		3,098	23.94
Republican hold

=== 3rd Ward ===
Third Ward
Party	Candidate	Votes	%
Republican	Robert R. Jackson, incumbent	8,104	58.94
Republican	Nathan S. Taylor	5,048	36.71
Republican	Julius J. Link	598	4.35
Majority		3,056	22.23
Republican hold

=== 4th Ward ===
Fourth Ward
Party	Candidate	Votes	%
Republican	Berthold A. Cronson, incumbent	7,618	50.97
Republican	Alex Kieferstein	4,754	31.81
Republican	George W. Prince	2,392	16.00
Unknown	Frank A. Marshall	93	0.62
Republican	Reuben R. Helfer	90	0.60
Majority		2,864	19.16
Republican hold

=== 5th Ward ===
Fifth Ward
Party	Candidate	Votes	%
Republican	Charles S. Eaton	10,483	58.95
Democratic	Leonard J. Grossman, incumbent	6,106	34.33
Republican	Charles U. Turpin	783	4.40
Unknown	Robert Mendelson	180	1.01
Unknown	Leo J. Canary	83	0.47
Unknown	Herman Forel	81	0.46
Unknown	Harold J. Fishbein	68	0.38
Majority		4,377	24.61
Republican gain from Democratic

=== 8th Ward ===
Eighth Ward
Party	Candidate	Votes	%
Democratic	William D. Meyering, incumbent	12,763	52.49
Unknown	Edmund A. Miller	11,037	45.39
Unknown	Harry L. Lathe	514	2.11
Majority		1,726	7.10
Democratic hold

=== 10th Ward ===
Tenth Ward
Party	Candidate	Votes	%
Democratic	William A. Rowan, incumbent	6,683	72.59
Unknown	Charles J. Johnson	2,524	27.41
Majority		4,159	45.17
Democratic hold

=== 12th Ward ===
Twelfth Ward, first round
Party	Candidate	Votes	%
Democratic	Bryan Hartnett, incumbent	7,642	45.24
Republican	Benjamin J. Zintak	7,310	43.27
Unknown	Fred B. Heiser	1,820	10.77
Unknown	Alexander Bukowski	121	0.72
Majority		332	1.97

Twelfth Ward, runoff
Party	Candidate	Votes	%
Republican	Benjamin J. Zintak	9,937	50.84
Democratic	Bryan Hartnett, incumbent	9,609	49.16
Majority		328	1.68
Republican gain from Democratic

=== 14th Ward ===
Fourteenth Ward
Party	Candidate	Votes	%
Democratic	William R. O'Toole, incumbent	7,467	62.77
Unknown	Joseph M. Fitzgerald	4,095	34.42
Unknown	John Plaehn	334	2.81
Majority		3,372	28.35
Democratic hold

=== 18th Ward ===
Eighteenth Ward
Party	Candidate	Votes	%
Republican	Walter W. Morris	10,020	52.21
Democratic	Patrick F. Ryan, incumbent	8,027	41.83
Unknown	James J. Murphy	749	3.90
Unknown	James Gentlemen	393	2.05
Majority		1,993	10.39
Republican gain from Democratic

=== 20th Ward ===
Twentieth Ward
Party	Candidate	Votes	%
Republican	William V. Pacelli	4,879	57.94
Democratic	A. J. Prignano, incumbent	3,166	37.60
Unknown	Martin Klass	376	4.47
Majority		1,713	20.34
Republican gain from Democratic

=== 21st Ward ===
Twenty-first Ward
Party	Candidate	Votes	%
Democratic	Dennis A. Horan, incumbent	8,262	72.16
Unknown	John A. Stanek	2,801	24.46
Unknown	John Stoker	207	1.81
Unknown	Julius Markowski	180	1.57
Majority		5,461	47.69
Democratic hold

=== 22nd Ward ===
Twenty-second Ward
Party	Candidate	Votes	%
Democratic	Joseph Cepak, incumbent	3,917	100.00
Majority		3,917	100.00
Democratic hold

=== 27th Ward ===
Twenty-seventh Ward
Party	Candidate	Votes	%
Democratic	Harry C. Van Norman, incumbent	5,695	55.28
Republican	James Adduci	3,941	38.25
Unknown	Elmer L. Francis	522	5.07
Unknown	Frank A. Lyon	144	1.40
Majority		1,754	17.03
Democratic hold

=== 30th Ward ===
Thirtieth Ward
Party	Candidate	Votes	%
Democratic	John S. Clark Jr., incumbent	4,713	100.00
Majority		4,713	100.00
Democratic hold

=== 31st Ward ===
Thirty-first Ward, first round
Party	Candidate	Votes	%
Republican	Frank E. Konkowski	3,757	46.65
Democratic	Joseph Przybylo	2,581	32.05
Democratic	Stanley Adamkiewicz, incumbent	1,536	19.07
Unknown	George A. Gillmeister	180	2.23
Majority		1,176	14.60

Thirty-first Ward, runoff
Party	Candidate	Votes	%
Republican	Frank E. Konkowski	5,355	59.27
Democratic	Joseph Przybylo	3,680	40.73
Majority		1,675	18.54
Republican gain from Democratic

=== 33rd Ward ===
Thirty-third Ward
Party	Candidate	Votes	%
Republican	George M. Rozczynialski	5,191	54.73
Democratic	Joseph C. Petlak, incumbent	3,863	40.73
Unknown	Peter W. Sikora Jr.	190	2.00
Unknown	Joseph Malenkz	75	0.79
Unknown	Anthony Patewski	64	0.67
Unknown	Roman Kulla	54	0.57
Unknown	Paul L. Labucki	31	0.33
Unknown	Leo Luka	16	0.17
Majority		1,328	14.00
Republican gain from Democratic

=== 37th Ward ===
Thirty-seventh Ward, first round
Party	Candidate	Votes	%
Democratic	Wiley W. Mills, incumbent	9,078	41.07
Republican	James H. Taylor	4,555	20.61
Unknown	Bert Fairchild	2,997	13.56
Unknown	Irwin R. Hazen Jr.	2,849	12.89
Unknown	L.A. Warner	1,698	7.68
Unknown	Edward J. Finan	548	2.48
Unknown	Ommund B. Hanson	222	1.00
Unknown	Benjamin Davis	156	0.71
Majority		4,523	20.46

Thirty-seventh Ward, runoff
Party	Candidate	Votes	%
Republican	James H. Taylor	12,241	54.15
Democratic	Wiley W. Mills, incumbent	10,365	45.85
Majority		1,876	8.30
Republican gain from Democratic

=== 38th Ward ===
Thirty-eighth Ward
Party	Candidate	Votes	%
Democratic	Max Adamowski, incumbent	3,206	100.00
Majority		3,206	100.00
Democratic hold

=== 39th Ward ===
Thirty-ninth Ward, first round
Party	Candidate	Votes	%
Republican	Frank R. Ringa, incumbent	8,805	31.32
Republican	Frank J. Reilly	8,483	30.17
Democratic	Leo J. Winiecki	7,468	26.56
Unknown	Steve Adamowski	1,242	4.42
Unknown	Frank J. Schmidtke	841	2.99
Unknown	Gustave H. Hines	799	2.84
Unknown	Charles J. Busch	276	0.98
Unknown	William E. Koreywo	104	0.37
Unknown	John Kowalski	96	0.34
Majority		322	1.15

Thirty-ninth Ward, runoff
Party	Candidate	Votes	%
Republican	Frank R. Ringa, incumbent	16,118	52.89
Republican	Frank J. Reilly	14,358	47.11
Majority		1,760	5.78
Republican hold

=== 40th Ward ===
Fortieth Ward, first round
Party	Candidate	Votes	%
Republican	John William Chapman, incumbent	8,640	39.36
Republican	Joseph C. Ross	5,916	26.95
Democratic	Jay A. Schiller	4,921	22.42
Unknown	William D. McNally	1,110	5.06
Unknown	Charles H. Lenske	674	3.07
Unknown	L.B. Baum	257	1.17
Unknown	Chester A. Fredrickson	226	1.03
Unknown	Carl C. Rosenbaum	110	0.50
Unknown	I.J. Brown	99	0.45
Majority		2,724	12.41

Fortieth Ward, runoff
Party	Candidate	Votes	%
Republican	Joseph C. Ross	13,879	59.01
Republican	John William Chapman, incumbent	9,640	40.99
Majority		4,239	18.02
Republican gain from Republican

=== 41st Ward ===
Forty-first Ward
Party	Candidate	Votes	%
Democratic	Thomas J. Bowler, incumbent	15,374	62.66
Unknown	James A. Davis	8,362	34.08
Unknown	Petra M. Dahl	800	3.26
Majority		7,012	28.58
Democratic hold

=== 42nd Ward ===
Forty-second Ward, first round
Party	Candidate	Votes	%
Republican	Richard Prendergast	3,399	36.29
Democratic	Dorsey R. Crowe, incumbent	3,255	34.76
Unknown	C.R. Palmer	2,711	28.95
Majority		144	1.54

Forty-second Ward, runoff
Party	Candidate	Votes	%
Democratic	Dorsey R. Crowe, incumbent	6,063	57.72
Republican	Richard Prendergast	4,441	42.28
Majority		1,622	15.44
Democratic hold

=== 43rd Ward ===
Forty-third Ward
Party	Candidate	Votes	%
Republican	Arthur F. Albert	7,336	62.06
Republican	Charles G. Burmeister	2,485	21.02
Republican	Titus A. Haffa, incumbent	1,928	16.31
Unknown	Edward Hirschler	72	0.61
Majority		4,851	41.04
Republican gain from Republican

=== 44th Ward ===
Forty-fourth Ward
Party	Candidate	Votes	%
Republican	Albert E. Loescher, incumbent	6,505	63.32
Unknown	Joseph J. Miller	3,300	32.12
Unknown	George Hoppe	436	4.24
Unknown	Marcus Kasan	32	0.31
Majority		3,205	31.20
Republican hold

=== 45th Ward ===
Forty-fifth Ward, first round
Party	Candidate	Votes	%
Republican	William H. Feigenbutz, incumbent	6,771	47.06
Unknown	George W. Schmidt	4,598	31.95
Unknown	Paul Slivinski	3,020	20.99
Majority		2,173	15.00

Forty-fifth Ward, runoff
Party	Candidate	Votes	%
Republican	William H. Feigenbutz, incumbent	9,283	57.69
Unknown	George W. Schmidt	6,807	42.31
Majority		2,476	15.39
Republican hold

=== 46th Ward ===
Forty-sixth Ward
Party	Candidate	Votes	%
Republican	Oscar F. Nelson, incumbent	7,858	53.23
Republican	August F. W. Siebel	6,267	42.46
Republican	Edward P. Saltiel	421	2.85
Unknown	Arthur J. Damm	148	1.00
Unknown	Carl E. Liedberg	67	0.45
Majority		1,591	10.78
Republican hold

=== 47th Ward ===
Forty-seventh Ward
Party	Candidate	Votes	%
Republican	John J. Hoellen, incumbent	10,019	61.60
Democratic	M.J. Schmidt	6,019	37.01
Unknown	Eric A. Sodersten	227	1.40
Majority		4,000	24.59
Republican hold

=== 48th Ward ===
Forty-eighth Ward
Party	Candidate	Votes	%
Republican	John A. Massen, incumbent	8,178	84.91
Unknown	Robert W. Hommes	663	6.88
Unknown	Harry A. Hooker	392	4.07
Unknown	Danny Goodman	239	2.48
Unknown	Samuel Sommers	85	0.88
Unknown	Agis T. Nicholson	74	0.77
Majority		7,515	78.03
Republican hold

=== 49th Ward ===
Forty-ninth Ward
Party	Candidate	Votes	%
Republican	E.I. Frankhauser, incumbent	10,203	63.03
Unknown	J. Perry Quinlan	5,420	33.48
Unknown	Arthur L. Israel	324	2.00
Unknown	Chester S. Shaffer	240	1.48
Majority		4,783	29.55
Republican hold

=== 50th Ward ===
Fiftieth Ward, first round
Party	Candidate	Votes	%
Republican	Aron K. Mose, incumbent	5,574	25.35
Republican	Curtis F. Mellin	5,529	25.14
Unknown	Wiley K. Galloway	4,920	22.37
Unknown	Arthur W. Arneman	4,377	19.90
Democratic	Carl H. Lundquist	1,498	6.81
Unknown	Harry A. Martin	93	0.43
Majority		45	0.20

Fiftieth Ward, runoff
Party	Candidate	Votes	%
Republican	Curtis F. Mellin	13,347	57.32
Republican	Aron K. Mose, incumbent	9,938	42.68
Majority		3,409	14.64
Republican gain from Republican

== See also ==
- 1927 Chicago mayoral election
