= Nowa Wieś, Gmina Stary Zamość =

Nowa Wieś
- Village
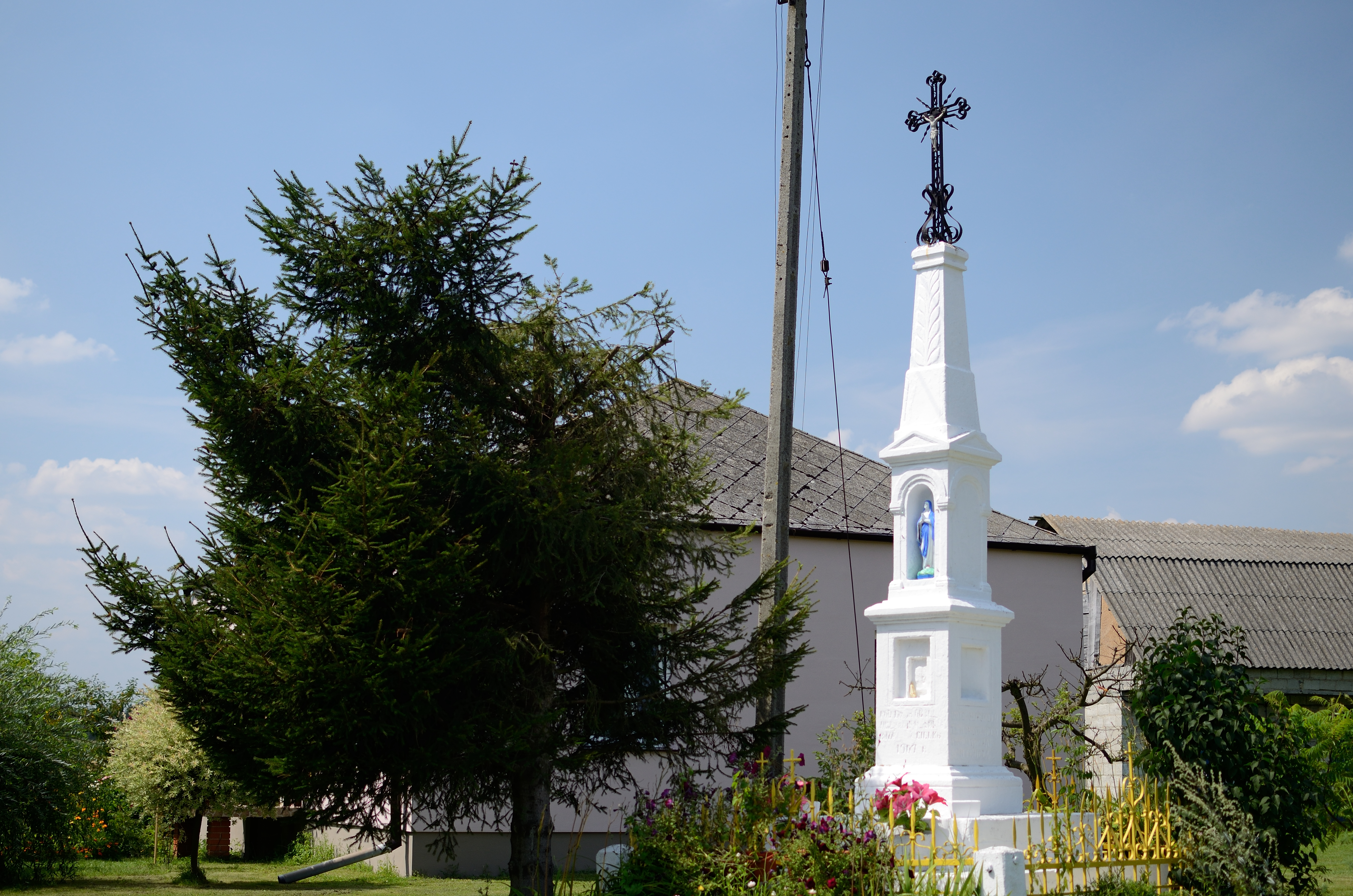

- Location within Poland
- Coordinates: 50°48′35″N 23°08′39″E
- Country: Poland
- Voivodeship: Lublin
- County: Zamość
- Gmina: Stary Zamość

Nowa Wieś [ˈnɔva ˈvjɛɕ] is a village in the administrative district of Gmina Stary Zamość, within Zamość County, Lublin Voivodeship, in eastern Poland.
