= Podstary Zamość =

- Village
- Location within Poland
- Coordinates: 50°49′25″N 23°07′44″E
- Country: Poland
- Voivodeship: Lublin
- County: Zamość
- Gmina: Stary Zamość
- Time zone: UTC+1 (CET)
  - Summer (DST): UTC+2 (CEST)

Podstary Zamość (Polish pronunciation: [pɔtsˈtarɨ ˈzamɔɕt͡ɕ]) is a village in the administrative district of Gmina Stary Zamość, within Zamość County, Lublin Voivodeship, in eastern Poland.

== History ==
Four Polish citizens were murdered by Nazi Germany in the village during World War II.
