= Michael Dorsey =

Michael Dorsey may refer to:

- Michael K. Dorsey, environmental expert
- J. Michael Dorsey, American attorney and administrator
- Michael Dorsey, former name of Michael Takahashi (born 1974), Japanese-American basketball player
- Michael Dorsey, fictional actor in the movie Tootsie

== See also ==
- Mike Dorsey (1930–2014), English-born Australian actor
