= Chomęciska Małe =

- Village
- Location within Poland
- Coordinates: 50°49′N 23°13′E
- Country: Poland
- Voivodeship: Lublin
- County: Zamość
- Gmina: Stary Zamość

Chomęciska Małe [xɔmɛnˈt͡ɕiska ˈmawɛ] is a village in the administrative district of Gmina Stary Zamość, within Zamość County, Lublin Voivodeship, in eastern Poland.
