= Gmina Stary Zamość =

Gmina Stary Zamość Stary Zamość Commune
- Gmina
- Interactive map of Gmina Stary Zamość
- Coordinates (Stary Zamość): 50°48′N 23°10′E
- Country: Poland
- Voivodeship: Lublin
- County: Zamość County
- Seat: Stary Zamość

Area
  - Total: 97.19 km^{2} (37.53 sq mi)

Population (2013)
  - Total: 5,322
  - Density: 54.76/km^{2} (141.8/sq mi)
- Website: http://www.staryzamosc.cor.pl

Gmina Stary Zamość is a rural gmina (administrative district) in Zamość County, Lublin Voivodeship, in eastern Poland. Its seat is the village of Stary Zamość, which lies approximately 11 kilometres (7 mi) north-west of Zamość and 65 km (40 mi) south-east of the regional capital Lublin.

The gmina covers an area of 97.19 square kilometres (37.5 sq mi), and as of 2006 its total population is 5,456 (5,322 in 2013).

The gmina contains part of the protected area called Skierbieszów Landscape Park.

== Villages ==
Gmina Stary Zamość contains the villages and settlements of Bezednia, Borowina, Chomęciska Duże, Chomęciska Duże-Kolonia, Chomęciska Małe, Doły, Koniec, Krasne, Majdan Sitaniecki, Nowa Wieś, Podkrasne, Podstary Zamość, Stary Zamość, Udrycze, Udrycze-Kolonia and Wisłowiec.

== Neighbouring gminas ==
Gmina Stary Zamość is bordered by the gminas of Izbica, Nielisz, Skierbieszów and Zamość.
