= Chomęciska Duże-Kolonia =

- Village
- Location within Poland
- Coordinates: 50°48′54″N 23°14′06″E
- Country: Poland
- Voivodeship: Lublin
- County: Zamość
- Gmina: Stary Zamość

Chomęciska Duże-Kolonia [xɔmɛnˈt͡ɕiska ˈduʐɛ kɔˈlɔɲa] is a village in the administrative district of Gmina Stary Zamość, within Zamość County, Lublin Voivodeship, in eastern Poland.

== History ==
The village of Chomęciska Duże-Kolonia has a history connected to the broader history of Zamość County. The area has seen influences from various historical periods, including the Polish–Lithuanian Commonwealth and periods of occupation. While specific historical records of Chomęciska Duże-Kolonia are limited, the region around Zamość has a rich history dating back to medieval times.

== See also ==
- Gmina Stary Zamość
- Zamość Old Town
- Lublin Voivodeship
