= Dorle =

Dorle is both a surname and a given name. Notable people with the name include:

- Avinash K. Dorle (1935–2015), Indian scientist and professor
- Dorle Soria (1900–2002), American publicist, record producer, and journalist

== See also ==
- Dorge
- Dorley
