= United States Secretary of Housing and Urban Development =

Head of the Department of Housing and Urban Development

- Seal of the department

- Flag of the department

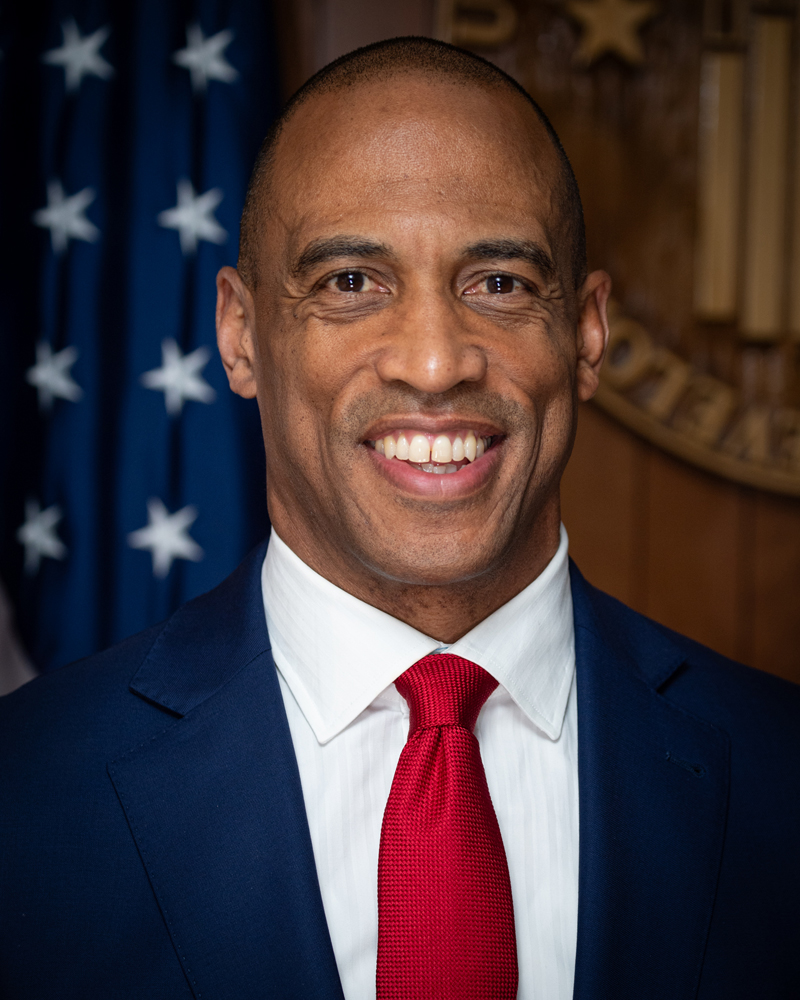
- Incumbent; Scott Turner since February 5, 2025
- Department of Housing and Urban Development
- Style: Mr. Secretary (informal); The Honorable (formal)
- Member of: Cabinet
- Reports to: President of the United States
- Seat: Robert C. Weaver Federal Building, Washington, D.C.
- Appointer: The president; with advice and consent of the Senate
- Term length: No fixed term
- Constituting instrument: 42 U.S.C. § 3532
- Formation: September 9, 1965; 61 years ago
- First holder: Robert C. Weaver
- Succession: Thirteenth
- Deputy: Deputy Secretary
- Salary: Executive Schedule, Level I
- Website: hud.gov/aboutus/secretary

The United States secretary of housing and urban development is the head of the United States Department of Housing and Urban Development, a member of the Cabinet of the United States, and thirteenth in the presidential line of succession. The post was created with the formation of the Department of Housing and Urban Development on September 9, 1965, by President Lyndon B. Johnson's signing of The Department of Housing and Urban Development Act into law. The department's mission is "to increase homeownership, support community development and increase access to affordable housing free from discrimination".

The secretary of housing and urban development is a Level I position in the Executive Schedule, thus earning a salary of US$253,100, as of January 2026.

The current secretary of housing and urban development is Scott Turner, who was sworn in on February 5, 2025.

== List of secretaries of housing and urban development ==
Parties

Democratic (9) Republican (10)

Status

Denotes acting secretary

No.	Portrait	Name	State/territory of residence	Took office	Left office	President(s)
1		Robert C. Weaver	New York	January 18, 1966	December 18, 1968	Lyndon B. Johnson (1963–1969)
2		Robert Wood	Massachusetts	January 7, 1969	January 20, 1969	Lyndon B. Johnson (1963–1969)
3		George W. Romney	Michigan	January 22, 1969	January 20, 1973	Richard Nixon (1969–1974)
4		James Lynn	Ohio	February 2, 1973	February 5, 1975	Richard Nixon (1969–1974)
4		James Lynn	Ohio	February 2, 1973	February 5, 1975	Gerald Ford (1974–1977)
5		Carla Hills	California	March 10, 1975	January 20, 1977	Gerald Ford (1974–1977)
6		Patricia Harris	District of Columbia	January 23, 1977	September 10, 1979	Jimmy Carter (1977–1981)
7		Moon Landrieu	Louisiana	September 24, 1979	January 20, 1981	Jimmy Carter (1977–1981)
8		Samuel Pierce	New York	January 23, 1981	January 20, 1989	Ronald Reagan (1981–1989)
–		J. Michael Dorsey; Acting	New York	January 20, 1989	February 13, 1989	George H. W. Bush (1989–1993)
9		Jack Kemp	New York	February 13, 1989	January 20, 1993	George H. W. Bush (1989–1993)
10		Henry Cisneros	Texas	January 22, 1993	January 20, 1997	Bill Clinton (1993–2001)
11		Andrew Cuomo	New York	January 29, 1997	January 20, 2001	Bill Clinton (1993–2001)
–		William C. Apgar; Acting		January 20, 2001	January 24, 2001	George W. Bush (2001–2009)
12		Mel Martinez	Florida	January 24, 2001	August 13, 2004	George W. Bush (2001–2009)
13		Alphonso Jackson	Texas	August 13, 2004	September 1, 2004	George W. Bush (2001–2009)
13		Alphonso Jackson	Texas	September 1, 2004	April 18, 2008	George W. Bush (2001–2009)
–		Roy A. Bernardi; Acting	New York	April 18, 2008	June 4, 2008	George W. Bush (2001–2009)
14		Steve Preston	Illinois	June 4, 2008	January 20, 2009	George W. Bush (2001–2009)
–		Brian D. Montgomery; Acting	Texas	January 20, 2009	January 26, 2009	Barack Obama (2009–2017)
15		Shaun Donovan	New York	January 26, 2009	July 28, 2014	Barack Obama (2009–2017)
16		Julián Castro	Texas	July 28, 2014	January 20, 2017	Barack Obama (2009–2017)
–		Craig Clemmensen; Acting		January 20, 2017	March 2, 2017	Donald Trump (2017–2021)
17		Ben Carson	Florida	March 2, 2017	January 20, 2021	Donald Trump (2017–2021)
–		Matt Ammon; Acting		January 20, 2021	March 10, 2021	Joe Biden (2021–2025)
18		Marcia Fudge	Ohio	March 10, 2021	March 22, 2024	Joe Biden (2021–2025)
–		Adrianne Todman; Acting	United States Virgin Islands	March 22, 2024	January 20, 2025	Joe Biden (2021–2025)
–		Matt Ammon; Acting		January 20, 2025	February 5, 2025	Donald Trump (2025–present)
19		Scott Turner	Texas	February 5, 2025	Incumbent	Donald Trump (2025–present)

U.S. order of precedence (ceremonial)
Preceded by Robert F. Kennedy Jr. as Secretary of Health and Human Services	Order of precedence of the United States as Secretary of Housing and Urban Development	Succeeded by Sean Duffy as Secretary of Transportation
U.S. presidential line of succession
Preceded by Secretary of Health and Human Services; Robert F. Kennedy Jr.	13th in line	Succeeded by Secretary of Transportation; Sean Duffy
