= Doły =

Doły may refer to the following Polish places:

- Doły, Lesser Poland Voivodeship (south Poland)
- Doły, Łomża County in Podlaskie Voivodeship (north-east Poland)
- Doły, Mońki County in Podlaskie Voivodeship (north-east Poland)
- Doły, Lublin Voivodeship (east Poland)
- Doły, Gmina Kamieniec, Grodzisk County in Greater Poland Voivodeship (west-central Poland)
- Doły, Słupca County in Greater Poland Voivodeship (west-central Poland)
- Doły, Silesian Voivodeship (south Poland)
- Doły, Pomeranian Voivodeship (north Poland)
- Doły, West Pomeranian Voivodeship (north-west Poland)

== See also ==
- Doly (Karviná), district of the city of Karviná, Czech Republic
- Doly Begum, Canadian politician
