= Borowina, Zamość County =

Borowina
- Village
- Location within Poland
- Coordinates: 50°48′3″N 23°12′58″E
- Country: Poland
- Voivodeship: Lublin
- County: Zamość
- Gmina: Stary Zamość

Borowina [bɔrɔˈvina] is a village in the administrative district of Gmina Stary Zamość, within Zamość County, Lublin Voivodeship, in eastern Poland.
