= Westmoreland County Community College =

Public college in Youngwood, Pennsylvania, US

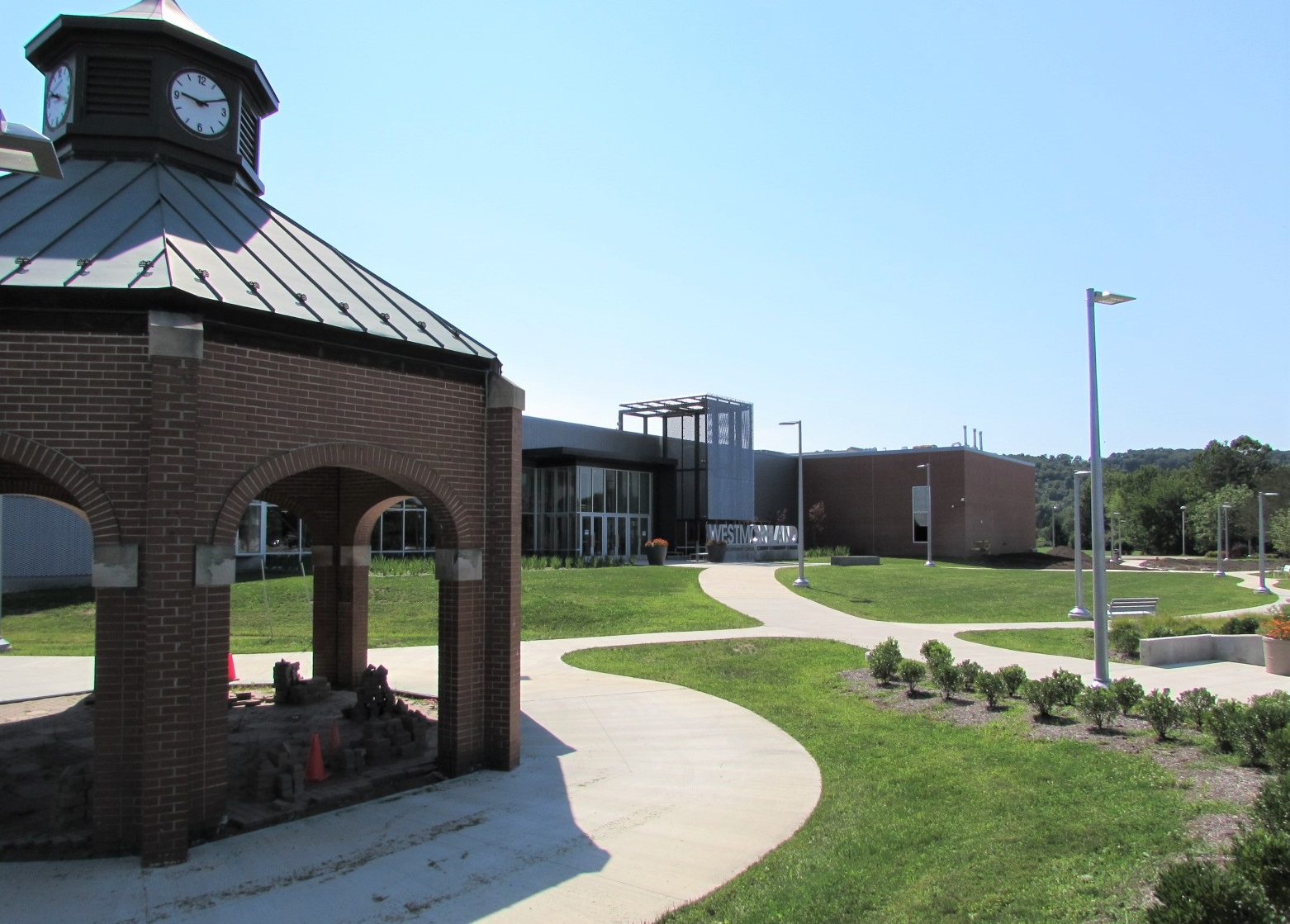
- Motto: Ambitious.
- Type: Public community college
- Established: 1970
- President: Dr. Kristin L. Mallory
- Location: Youngwood, Pennsylvania, U.S. 40.2331°N 79.5664°W
- Colors: Blue and green
- Nickname: Wolfpack
- Sporting affiliations: NJCAA
- Mascot: Westly Wolf
- Website: www.westmoreland.edu
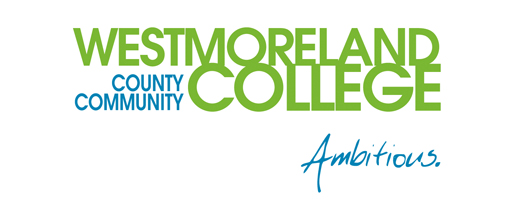

Westmoreland County Community College is a public community college in Youngwood, Pennsylvania, United States. It was founded in 1970 during an era of community college proliferation within the state. Its location on the suburban fringe was designed to attract students from both the Westmoreland County suburbs of Pittsburgh and the Monongahela Valley, then a still booming industrial center. The college has also extended its outreach to provide services to students from Fayette and Indiana Counties.

== History ==
After being first proposed by school directors in the county in 1967, Westmoreland County Community College was officially founded in 1970. The institution first offered evening classes at Jeannette High School in 1971 with 243 students enrolled. By the fall of 1972, the college took up a permanent residence in a former Westinghouse plant in Youngwood and expanded its schedule to include day classes.

Westmoreland currently offers 64 associate degree programs, 13 diploma options and 49 certificate programs to prepare students for careers or transfer to baccalaureate degree programs at a four-year institution. The college also offers Continuing Education courses for adults, displaced workers, non-traditional students and summer camps for kids.

The college hosts several athletics teams, nicknamed the Wolfpack, including baseball, basketball, bowling, softball, and volleyball. In fall 2020, the women's cross country team was ranked number two in the nation by the U.S. Track & Field and Cross Country Coaches Association. In fall 2023, the athletics program transitioned to Division II in the NCJAA and began to offer scholarships to student athletes. Teams compete in the Western Pennsylvania Athletic Conference.

Dr. Kristin L. Mallory was named the college's president beginning in July 2025.

== Campus ==
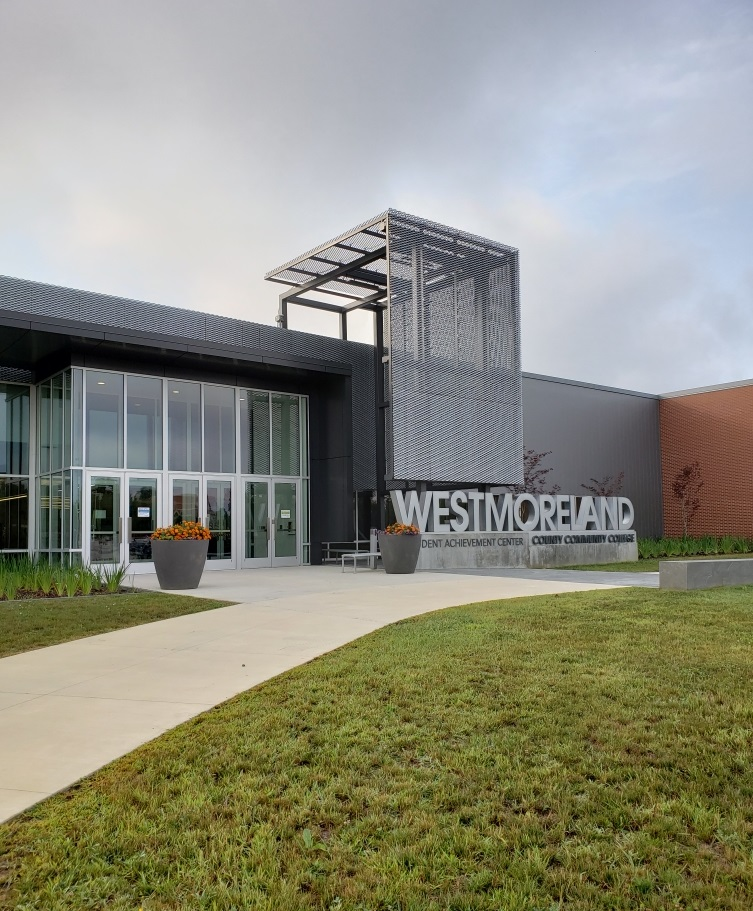
Student Achievement Center at the Youngwood campus

In the four decades since, Westmoreland's original campus in Youngwood has expanded from a single building to four buildings.

Student Achievement Center

Westmoreland's original building, formerly known as Founders Hall, houses academic and administrative offices, classrooms, the library, a 300-seat amphitheater and a tutoring and learning center. It also contains the college store, student center, cafeteria and a licensed day care center. A gymnasium, indoor running track and a combination aerobic/fitness center provide fitness options for students and faculty. A major renovation of the building was completed in 2020.

Health and Culinary Center

The Health and Culinary Center houses additional academic and administrative offices, classrooms, laboratories, a culinary arts complex and a dining facility. It was the first permanent facility constructed expressly for the college's use and was first known as Commissioners Hall when it was opened in June 1990.

Science Innovation Center

Science Innovation Center consists of classrooms and laboratories, a dental hygiene clinic and an art gallery. The facility also contains a 420-seat theater. It was opened in 1994 as Science Hall in June 1994 before its expansion in August 2018.

Business and Industry Center

The Business and Industry Center contains administrative offices and classrooms. It also holds offices for PA CareerLink-Westmoreland and the Workforce Investment Board. It was purchased from a neighboring business in March 2000.

Athletic facilities

Constructed in 1992, the baseball field, softball field and multipurpose field are used for intercollegiate competitions, intramural sporting activities and noncredit programming.

== Education centers ==
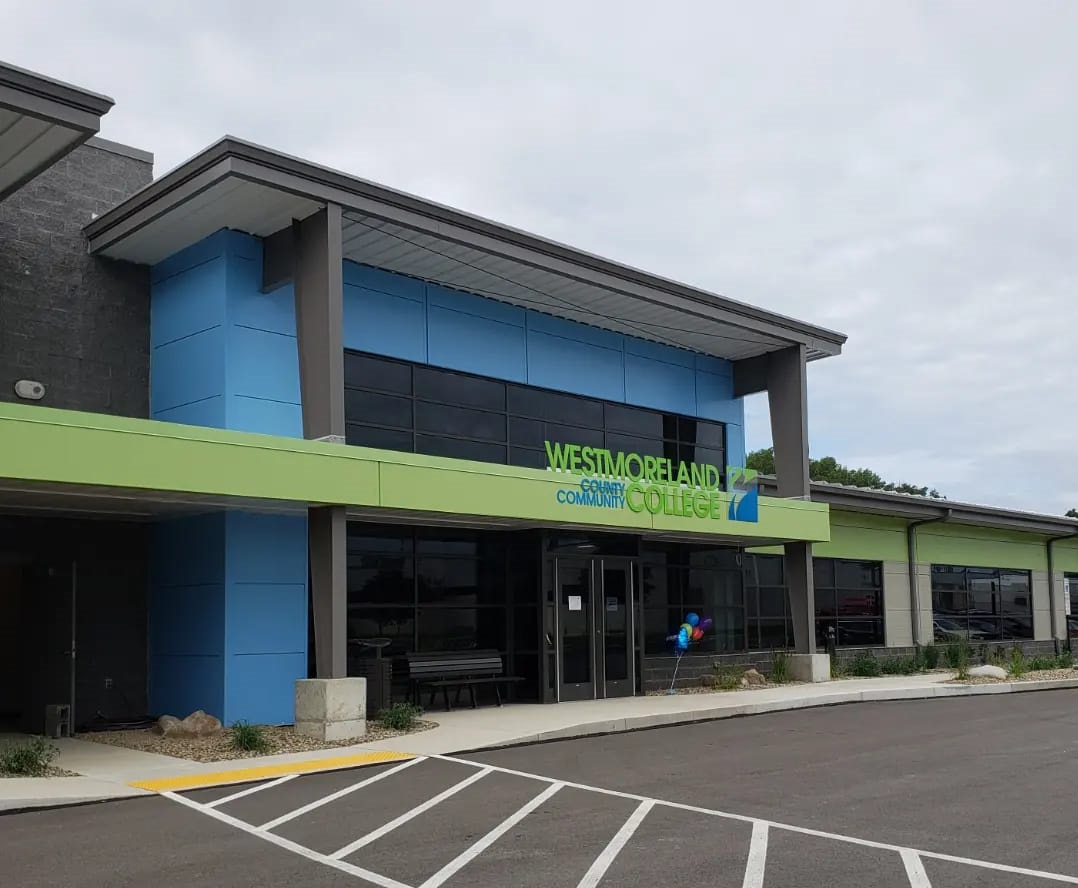
Westmoreland County Community College has locations in three counties, including the Indiana Center.

Westmoreland County Community College maintains education centers that serve Westmoreland, Fayette and Indiana counties. Each center offers day and evening classes as well as online courses. Student services such as counseling, advising and financial aid are available at scheduled times.

Murrysville Education Center

Located in Export, this center houses traditional classrooms, a distance learning classroom, computer and science laboratories, workforce development training and a student lounge.

Latrobe Education Center

This center contains traditional classrooms, distance learning classroom, computer classrooms/labs, electronic classrooms, a natural science classroom/lab and student lounge areas.

New Kensington Education Center

Founded in 2009, this center is located in downtown New Kensington. It contains traditional classrooms, a distance learning classroom, computer classrooms/labs, a science lab and a student lounge. The New Kensington Education Center is also home to PA CareerLink - Alle-Kiski, which provides services to the unemployed.

Public Safety Training Center

Completed in 2003 with an addition in 2018, this training center is located in South Huntington Township. Designed for firefighter, police and emergency services personnel, it features a class A live burn building, outdoor firing range, rubble pile and a classroom/administration building.

Fayette County Education Center

Housed in the Fayette County Community Action Agency Inc. Campus in Uniontown, this center features traditional classrooms, a computer classroom, a videoconferencing classroom and administrative offices.

Indiana County Center

The college opened a location in Indiana near the Jimmy Stewart Airport. A new state-of-the-art facility housing the Indiana County Center was opened in fall 2022, located next to the Indiana County Technology Center.

Advanced Technology Center

The college opened its 73,500 square foot Advanced Technology Center in 2014 in a former Sony plant. Located in Mount Pleasant, the ATC offers training for students and incumbent workers in applied industrial technology, mechatronics, energy technologies, design technologies, machining and fabrication, additive manufacturing, welding, and STEM. In 2023, the ATC received a grant to create a makerspace on campus.

== Notable alumni ==
- Herman Mihalich, former Democratic member of the Pennsylvania House of Representatives
- Richard Rosendale, chef
- John Dorsey, poet and screenwriter
