= Koniec, Lublin Voivodeship =

Koniec
- Village
- Location within Poland
- Coordinates: 50°47′52″N 23°17′3″E
- Country: Poland
- Voivodeship: Lublin
- County: Zamość
- Gmina: Stary Zamość
- Population: 860

Koniec [ˈkɔɲɛt͡s] (translation: The End) is a village in the administrative district of Gmina Stary Zamość, within Zamość County, Lublin Voivodeship, in eastern Poland.
