= Majdan Sitaniecki =

- Village
- Location within Poland
- Coordinates: 50°51′N 23°16′E
- Country: Poland
- Voivodeship: Lublin
- County: Zamość
- Gmina: Stary Zamość

Majdan Sitaniecki (Polish pronunciation: [ˈmajdan ɕitaˈɲɛtskʲi]) is a village in the administrative district of Gmina Stary Zamość, within Zamość County, Lublin Voivodeship, in eastern Poland.
