= Podkrasne =

- Village
- Location within Poland
- Coordinates: 50°50′22″N 23°10′26″E
- Country: Poland
- Voivodeship: Lublin
- County: Zamość
- Gmina: Stary Zamość

Podkrasne [pɔtˈkrasnɛ] is a village in the administrative district of Gmina Stary Zamość, within Zamość County, Lublin Voivodeship, in eastern Poland.
