= Krasne, Zamość County =

Krasne
- Village
- Location within Poland
- Coordinates: 50°52′N 23°10′E
- Country: Poland
- Voivodeship: Lublin
- County: Zamość
- Gmina: Stary Zamość

Krasne [ˈkrasnɛ] is a village in the administrative district of Gmina Stary Zamość, within Zamość County, Lublin Voivodeship, in eastern Poland.
