= Dorsey (given name) =

Dorsey is a primarily masculine given name which may refer to:

- Dorsey Armstrong (born 1970), professor of English and Medieval Literature
- Dorsey Burnette (1932–1979), American early rockabilly singer
- Dorsey Crowe (1891–1962), American politician
- Dorsey Dixon (1897–1968), American old-time and country music songwriter and musician
- Dorsey B. Hardeman (1902–1992), American politician, attorney and businessman
- Dorsey F. Henderson Jr., American Episcopal bishop
- Dorsey Levens (born 1970), American retired National Football League player
- Dorsey W. M. McConnell, American Anglican bishop
- Dorsey Ridley (born 1953), American politician
- Dorsey W. Shackleford (1853–1936), American politician
- Dorsey B. Thomas (1823–1897), American politician
