= Udrycze =

- Village
- Location within Poland
- Coordinates: 50°48′N 23°17′E
- Country: Poland
- Voivodeship: Lublin
- County: Zamość
- Gmina: Stary Zamość

Udrycze [uˈdrɨt͡ʂɛ] is a village in the administrative district of Gmina Stary Zamość, within Zamość County, Lublin Voivodeship, in eastern Poland.
