= Stary Zamość =

- Village
- Location within Poland
- Coordinates: 50°48′N 23°10′E
- Country: Poland
- Voivodeship: Lublin
- County: Zamość
- Gmina: Stary Zamość

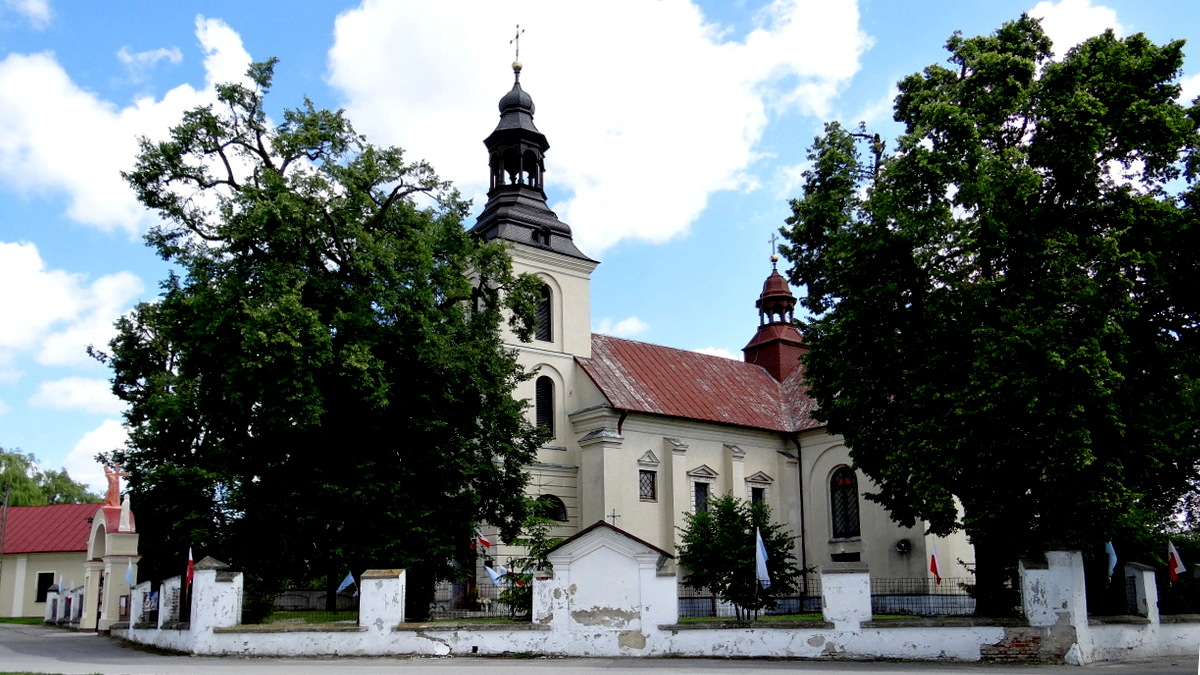

Stary Zamość (Polish pronunciation: [ˈstarɨ ˈzamɔɕt͡ɕ]) is a village in Zamość County, Lublin Voivodeship, in eastern Poland. It is the seat of the gmina (administrative district) called Gmina Stary Zamość.
