= Udrycze-Kolonia =

- Village
- Location within Poland
- Coordinates: 50°46′59″N 23°17′12″E
- Country: Poland
- Voivodeship: Lublin
- County: Zamość
- Gmina: Stary Zamość

Udrycze-Kolonia [uˈdrɨt͡ʂɛ kɔˈlɔɲa] is a village in the administrative district of Gmina Stary Zamość, within Zamość County, Lublin Voivodeship, in eastern Poland.
