= John Dorsey =

John Dorsey may refer to:

- John Dorsey (American football) (born 1960), former American football player
- John Lloyd Dorsey Jr. (1891–1960), Representative from the U.S. state of Kentucky
- John M. Dorsey (1900–1978), author, psychiatrist and educator
- John H. Dorsey (1937–2018), American attorney and politician in New Jersey
- John W. Dorsey (1936–2014), University of Maryland, College Park administrator
- John Dorsey (poet), American poet and screenwriter
- Jack Dorsey (born 1976), inventor of Twitter
- USS Dorsey (DD-117), a Wickes-class destroyer in the United States Navy
