= Dorge =

Dorge is a surname. Notable people with the surname include:

- John Dorge (born 1962), Australian basketball player
- Mitch Dorge (born 1960), Canadian drummer
- Pierre Dørge (born 1946), Danish jazz guitarist

== See also ==
- Dorge Kouemaha (born 1983), Cameroonian soccer player
- Dorle
