= John Dorsey (poet) =

American poet (born 1976)

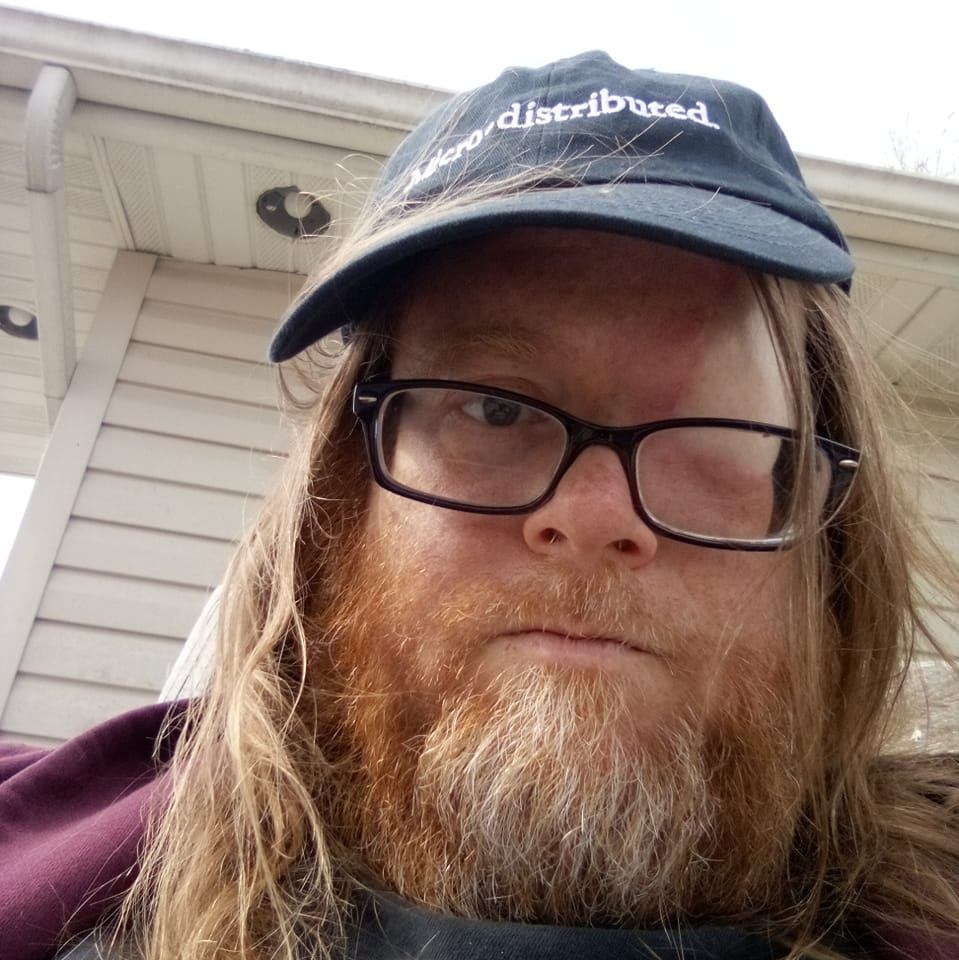
- Born: November 27, 1976 (age 49); Hawaii
- Education: B.F.A Writing for Film & Television, The University of the Arts (1997-2002); A.A. English & Philosophy, Westmoreland County Community College (1995-1997)
- Occupations: Poet, screenwriter, journalist, editor
- Writing career
- Period: 1992-present
- Notable work: Appalachian Frankenstein
- Notable awards: Terry Award for Poetry

John Dorsey (born 1976) is an American poet, playwright, newspaper journalist, and screenwriter. Dorsey is the author of over one hundred collections of poetry and his work has appeared in over 2,000 anthologies and literary magazines. Former Poet Laureate of Belle, Missouri, he is the recipient of the 2019 Terry Award, given at Poetry Rendezvous and a 2026 Hobo Camp Review Award Winner for his poem "Hummingbird Dog Fight." Dorsey is also a founder and co-editor of the Gasconade Review, with Jason Ryberg and River Dog Press, with Victor Clevenger. Dorsey is known for his prolific writing career as a poet, and as a major influence on small press, grassroots poetry movements in the U.S. Since 1992, his poems have been published in more than 2000 literary magazines and anthologies.

== Personal life and education ==
John Dorsey was born on a military base in Hawaii in 1976, but spent much of his childhood in Greensburg, Pennsylvania. After graduating from Hempfield Area High School, he first attended Westmoreland County Community College, where he completed an Associate's degree in English & Philosophy. He later moved to Philadelphia, Pennsylvania, to attend The University of the Arts, earning a B.F.A. in Writing for Film & Television in 2002 and studying under screenwriter Charles Purpura. From 2005 to 2014, Dorsey worked as a Staff Writer and Columnist for the Toledo Free Press newspaper. Since then, he has lived in Sheboygan, Wisconsin, and Belle, Missouri, serving as the latter city's first poet laureate. In 2022, Dorsey was diagnosed with advanced basal cell carcinoma.

== Style and subject matter ==
Dorsey's poetry engages a "spare and exact" style, one that "relies on an economy of words, short stanzas, and minimal punctuation," to explore themes of personal relationships, human struggles, the working class, and the complexities of everyday life. His work is known for its raw honesty and vivid storytelling, reflecting on the often traumatic or marginal lives of people around him with "balanced empathy." In his review of Dorsey's collectionYour Daughter's Country, Glynn Young writes:

Dorsey tells stories about the people he knows and loves. He writes about grandparents, cousins, friends, the parents of friends, aunts and uncles. He writes about their pets, the towns where they lived, their work, their dreams, their tragedies, and what happens in their lives.

Poet and editor Kristofer Collins has called Dorsey's style "unadorned and lean," while describing the thematic focus of that poetry as "concerned with blue collar themes, life below the poverty line, and existence on the margins of contemporary American society." Another Pennsylvanian poet, Jason Baldinger, further connects Dorsey's work to the empathetic examination of working class life, writing:

There is a celebration in his poems of working class life; you can see the rust belt ribs of his growing up near Jeanette in his poems. The poems are not so much sad as they are an elegy for outsiders in dead end places. There is always hope and grace in his words.

An additional theme of Dorsey's poetry is that of the experience of disability, growing up with cerebral palsy, and living with cancer later in life. This theme is particularly salient in his later work as he became more comfortable sharing that aspect of his life. Dorsey's more recent engagement with disability is taken up by critic Chase Dimock's review of 100 Mornings:

Dorsey’s physical health is a constant presence in his work as he’s endured coping with disability, cancer treatments, and most recently, the loss of an eye. And yet, Dorsey uses his pain not to wallow or milk sympathy, but to understand the pain of others through the connective tissue of poetry. The symptoms of a stroke transition to the smell of books and the memories of friends he made through poetry by instinct.

== Selected published works ==
- Teaching the Dead to Sing: The Outlaw's Prayer (Rose of Sharon Press, 2006)
- Sodomy is a City in New Jersey (American Mettle Books, 2010) ISBN 978-0-9562912-6-4
- Tombstone Factory (Epic Rites Press, 2013)
- Appalachian Frankenstein (GTK Press, 2015)
- Being the Fire (Tangerine Press, 2016) ISBN 978-1-910691-12-0
- Shoot the Messenger (Red Flag Press, 2017)
- Triple Threat (Crisis Chronicles Press, 2019) ISBN 978-1-64092-975-3
- Your Daughter's Country (Blue Horse Press, 2019) ISBN 978-0578464596
- The Afterlife of the Party: New & Selected Poems, 2016-2018 (Ragged Lion Press, 2019)
- Which Way to the River? (Osage Arts Community Books, 2020) ISBN 195241136X
- The Prettiest Girl at the Dance (Blue Horse Press, 2020) ISBN 978-0578818788
- Afterlife Karaoke (Crisis Chronicles Press, 2021) ISBN 979-8-88596-996-3
- Maple Leaf Zen (Crisis Chronicles Press, 2022) ISBN 978-1-64092-951-7
- Pocatello Wildflower (Crisis Chronicles Press, 2023) ISBN 979-8-88596-992-5
- Holocaust Agave: Selected Chapbook Poems 2021-2023 (Cyberwit, 2024) ISBN 978-8119654680
- 100 Mornings [illustrations by Juliane Hundertmark] (Sacred Parasite, 2025) ISBN 978-3-910822-12-2
- The Pigeons of Judgment Day (Crying Heart Press, 2025)
- Trump Stamp (Crisis Chronicles Press, 2026)

== Film and theatre ==
Dorsey has also worked as a writer for film and theatre. His first play, Moon Magnets, featuring David M. Zuber and Rebecca Lovett, premiered Off-Broadway at the Producers Club in New York City in 2001, and was produced by Paladin Music & Entertainment. As a screenwriter, he wrote Buffalo Diamonds (2011), produced by Paladin Knight Pictures and directed by Chris Lance and Missouri Loves Company (2020) also directed by Chris Lance. More recently, Dorsey worked as a literary Dramaturg on the Julia Sun play Almost Gold.
