= Harold Doley =

American investment banker and diplomat

Harold E. Doley, Jr.
- Born: Harold Emanuel Doley, Jr. March 8, 1947 (age 79); New Orleans, Louisiana
- Citizenship: United States of America
- Spouse: Helena Cobette
- Children: Harold Emanuel Doley III, Aaron Michael Doley

Harold E. Doley, Jr. (born March 8, 1947) is an investment banker and former United States ambassador. He is the founder of an investment banking firm in the U.S., taking emeritus status in 2003.

== Career ==
In 1973, Ambassador Doley bought a seat on the New York Stock Exchange and is the only African American to have owned a seat (there are no longer NYSE individual memberships). He operated his membership as a Floor Broker, executing orders for other members and member firms on the floor of the NYSE. Ambassador Doley began his professional career in investment banking in 1968. He served as Vice President with major Wall Street firms prior to buying his own seat. He serviced institutional accounts of banks, insurance companies, and university endowments. During this period, Ambassador Doley also affected and counseled on a number of mergers and acquisitions of life insurance companies. Ambassador Doley was the Co-Founder of the U.S.-Africa Chamber of Commerce. He chaired the investment committee of the Southern Africa Enterprise Development Fund (SAEDF), a private equity fund, and placed the first black market maker on the Johannesburg Stock Exchange. Over the years, he advised African stock exchanges and the regulatory bodies of those stock exchanges. Ambassador Doley was honored by his industry peers as an Outstanding Broker of the Year in 1971. The Dow Jones Wall Street Journal selected him as Stock Picker of the Year in 1990.

== Ambassador ==
Ambassador Doley was accorded ambassadorial rank while serving as United States Representative to the African Development Bank and Fund (AfDB), from 1983 to 1985. The AfDB, headquartered in Abidjan, Ivory Coast, is a multi-lateral development institution owned by the governments of 54 African and 25 non-African countries, with assets of $220 billion. Ambassador Doley crafted and conveyed U.S. Government positions regarding AfDB financial proposals and policies. While at the African Development Bank and Fund, Ambassador Doley participated in the first $100 million private placement for Africa. Upon returning to the private sector, he was the lead banker for the first $100 million U.S. medium-term notes for the African Development Bank and Fund, a 30-year bond (sold to TIAA-CREF). The AfDB was able to quadruple its capital by using Ambassador Doley's capital increase formula. While serving as United States Executive Director to the AfDB, Ambassador Doley worked with the Vice President of Finance in securing a AAA rating from the global financial rating agencies, the first AAA rating for an African-based entity. Ambassador Doley worked with African Heads of State and Ministers of commerce, finance, international trade and development.

In 1982 Ambassador Doley was appointed the Founding Director of the Minerals Management Service (MMS) at the U.S. Department of Interior. Ambassador Doley managed MMS, an organization of more than 5,000 employees and a budget of $1.2 billion, and its collection of $12 billion in income due the United States Treasury. This represented the second largest income source to the U.S. Government. Ambassador Doley had prior experience in this realm, having served as a Board Member of the Louisiana State Mineral Board, a gubernatorial appointment.

== Additional community and public service ==
Ambassador Doley has an extensive track record of community and public service, primarily focusing on education. He has been an appointee in five Republican Administrations. Early in the 21st century, Doley was appointed by then-President George W. Bush to the President's Board of Advisors Commission on Historically Black Colleges and Universities. From 1970 to 1977 Ambassador Doley was an instructor at Southern University in New Orleans, teaching one course per semester in Economics, Business Structure, or Money and Banking. His board-of-directors affiliations reflect keen interest in education and his commitment to sustainable development in Africa. As a New York Stock Exchange member, Ambassador Doley hosted both President Frederick Chiluba of Zambia and President Festus Mogae of Botswana for the ringing of the closing bell, the first two African heads of state to have such a distinction. At the request of the Sisters of the Blessed Sacrament, a religious order founded by St. Katharine Drexel, Ambassador Doley underwrote the travel of one dozen nuns for St. Katharine Drexel's canonization by the Vatican in 2000. He also provided the transportation to Native Americans who were alumni of schools founded by St. Katharine Drexel on Native American reservations.

The Doley Family was honored in a special mass during St. Louis Cathedral's designation to Basilica (New Orleans, 1997) for their contributions. The Doley Family provided the Papal symbols of canopeum and tintinnabulum, necessary to meet the requirements of a Basilica. A sculpture dedicated in the St. Louis Cemetery No. 1 honors the Doley Family and its heritage in New Orleans, which dates back to August 1720. Archbishop Alfred C. Hughes of New Orleans blessed the sculpture at a special ceremony with the family in 2008.

Ambassador Doley is a member of the Council on Foreign Relations and a member of the Council for Inclusive Capitalism.

== Africa (Further involvements) ==
In 1977, Ambassador Doley commissioned a report on the platinum industry of South Africa. The conclusion was that the apartheid system rendered platinum, and other strategic resources, as an unreliable source for the U.S. This report was reviewed in the Wall Street Journal and resulted in Ambassador Doley being the special guest on Wall $treet Week with Louis Rukeyser on PBS in 1977. Ambassador Doley challenged Wall Street for its recommendation of De Beers stock during the period of sanctions against South Africa. This resulted in the buy recommendation of De Beers being removed. During the 1980s, Ambassador Doley consulted with the stock exchanges of Nigeria, Tanzania, Kenya, Ghana, and Zambia. Ambassador Doley played a role in the negotiations for peace in the Angolan Civil War.

== Board affiliations ==
- Helping Africa Foundation (HAF), New York
- W.E.B. Du Bois Museum Foundation
- International Advisory Board Chairman, Sagarmatha Technologies Limited
- Clark Atlanta University Board of Trustees Emeritus
- Interracial Counsel for Business Opportunity (ICBO)
- Youth for Johnson New Orleans, Co-Chair
- United Nations Commission on Disarmament Education, Conflict Resolution and Peace / International Association of University Presidents
- The Barnes Foundation
- The Smithsonian National Museum of African Art
- Corporate Council on Africa
- Africa America Institute
- Africare
- Southern Africa Enterprise Development Fund (SAEDF), Chairman of the Investment Committee, Board Chair Ambassador Andrew J. Young, Jr.
- Major stockholder in United Bank; now Liberty Bank & Trust, New Orleans
- Association of Public Broadcasters, National Board Member
- Board Treasurer of WYES New Orleans, a PBS affiliate (7 years)
- Co-Owner of Central Venture Capital Corporation; one of three African American owned and operated Minority Enterprise Small Business Investment Companies (MESBIC)
- Lead banker for management and underwriting syndicates for billions of dollars for the African Development Bank and Fund
- Advisory Board, U.S. Department of Education, Marine Cluster Project 1974-1977

== Most recent honors ==
- Imagine Award 2018 for Special Recognition in Social Justice (Cape Town, South Africa)
- Wall Street Global Legacy Award 2018 (World of Money)
- One of 50 Wall Street practitioners selected and interviewed by The New York Historical Society and The Narrative Trust for their piece entitled: Remembering Wall Street: 1950-1980 2017 Oral History Archive
- Africa Economy Builders Award 2015 (African Development Bank Group), Les Bâtisseurs de l’Economie Africaine
- Business Leadership Award 2006 (Sports Foundation's 17th Claude “Buddy” Young Dinner)
- Inducted into the United States Small Business Administration Hall of Fame, 2005 - 35th Inductee
- Lincoln University Business Award 2004 (Outstanding African American Businessman within last 150 years)
- 30-year member of New York Stock Exchange celebrated with ringing the Closing Bell, Sept. 3, 2003
- Thurgood Marshall Scholarship Fund Outstanding Service Award 2003
- Fortune Magazine 2003 Top Ten Minority Business Legends
- Founded Doley Foundation $5 million (Scholarships in Business and Internships for Thurgood Marshall College and its University)
- Keynote Speaker Harvard Business School African American Student and Alumni at the association's 33rd Annual Naylor Fitzhugh Dinner
- National Association for Equal Opportunity in Higher Education, Alumni of the Year
- Cover of The Network Journal, Nov 1998
- Cover of Minority Business Entrepreneur Magazine (MBE), Nov/Dec 1993
- Wall Street Journal 1990 "Stock Picker of the Year"
- Wall Street Journal front page, May 1983 (representing the United States at the African Development Bank and Fund)
- The Stock Market with Harold Doley, -WYLD radio 1969-73
- Has been involved with the ringing of the New York Stock Exchange Bell over two dozen times

== Education ==
- Harvard Graduate School of Business: Owner/President Management Program, 1990
- B.S. - Xavier University, New Orleans, Louisiana: Double Major in Accounting and Business, 1968

== Honorary degrees ==
- Doctor of Humane Letters - The Shaw University, Raleigh, North Carolina, 1992
- Doctor of Laws - Clark Atlanta University, Atlanta, GA, 1984
- Doctor of Humane Letters - Bishop College, Dallas, Texas, 1983
