= Thomas Dorsey =

Thomas Dorsey may refer to:

- Tommy Dorsey (1905–1956), bandleader and jazz trombone player
- Thomas A. Dorsey (1899–1993), gospel composer and performer, known as Georgia Tom in his earlier jazz career
- Thomas Beale Dorsey (1780–1855), American politician and judge in Maryland
- Thomas Graham Dorsey (1839–1897), American physician
- Dan Hornsby (1927–1939), recording artist who briefly used the pseudonym Tom Dorsey
