= James Dorsey =

James Dorsey may refer to:

- Jimmy Dorsey (1904–1957), American jazz musician and big band leader
- Jimmie Dorsey (sport shooter) (born 1940), American sport shooter
- James Owen Dorsey (1848–1895), American anthropologist
- Jim Dorsey (born 1955), Major League Baseball pitcher
