= Doły, Lublin Voivodeship =

Doły
- Village
- Location within Poland
- Coordinates: 50°50′22″N 23°08′27″E
- Country: Poland
- Voivodeship: Lublin
- County: Zamość
- Gmina: Stary Zamość

Doły [ˈdɔwɨ] is a village in the administrative district of Gmina Stary Zamość, within Zamość County, Lublin Voivodeship, in eastern Poland.
