= William V. Pacelli =

American politician

William V. Pacelli (February 16, 1893 – September 30, 1942) was an American politician.

Pacelli was born in Chicago, Illinois. He went to Medill High School and Bryant & Stratton Business School. He served in the Illinois House of Representatives from 1923 until 1929. Pacelli then served on the Chicago City Council from 1929 until his death. Pacelli was involved with the Republican Party. He died from a kidney ailment in Chicago, Illinois.

== See also ==
- List of Chicago aldermen since 1923
