= George Dorsey =

George Dorsey may refer to:

- George Washington Emery Dorsey (1842–1911), Representative to the United States Congress from Nebraska
- George Amos Dorsey (1868–1931), U.S. ethnographer of indigenous peoples of the Americas
- George W. Dorsey, victim of the 1946 Georgia lynching
