= Dorsey Crowe =

American politician

- Alderman Crowe circa 1929

Member of the Chicago City Council
- In office April 16, 1923 – July 1, 1962
- Preceded by: constituency established
- Succeeded by: Mayer Goldberg
- Constituency: 42nd ward
- In office April 28, 1919 – April 16, 1923 Serving with Earl J. Walker (1919–20) and Charles J. Agnew (1920–23)
- Preceded by: Robert H. McCormick
- Succeeded by: Dennis A. Horan
- Constituency: 21st ward

Personal details
- Born: August 21, 1891 Omaha, Nebraska, US
- Died: July 1, 1962 (aged 70) Chicago, Illinois, US
- Resting place: Queen of Heaven Cemetery
- Party: Democratic
- Spouse: Mary G. Kelly (m. 1939)
- Education: DePaul University
- Occupation: Real estate agent

Military service
- Allegiance: United States
- Branch/service: United States Army Air Service
- Rank: Second Lieutenant

Dorsey Ryan Crowe (August 21, 1891 – July 1, 1962) was an American politician who served as alderman of Chicago's 21st ward from 1919 to 1923 and upon its redistricting into the 42nd ward from 1923 to his death. A Democrat serving most of the Near North Side, he represented such affluent constituencies as the Gold Coast and Streeterville as well as such poor areas as Cabrini–Green and Goose Island. At the time of his death he was the Dean of the Chicago City Council, as well as the last alderman from the era of partisan aldermanic elections and when wards elected two aldermen each. An alderman for 43 years, and the last to have served under a Republican mayor, he is as of 2018 the third-longest serving alderman in Chicago history, behind Ed Burke of the 14th ward and John Coughlin of the 1st.

A corrupt and mob-linked yet popular and effective alderman, Crowe kept his affiliation with the machine in a changing climate and was able to maintain and entrench his power within the 42nd ward as the decades wore on. His long tenure witnessed many political changes in Chicago and his ward. When he assumed office, the Democratic Party of the area was bitterly fractured and his fellow aldermen were Republicans; in the years since his death the Democratic Party has been the dominant force of the 42nd ward, which has yet to have a Republican alderman as of 2018.

== Early life ==
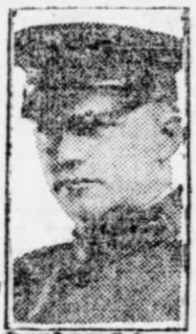
Crowe as an Air Service Lieutenant, 1918

Crowe was born on August 21, 1891, in Omaha, Nebraska, to Kathryn Josephine (née Ryan) and Stephen Augustus Crowe, who had been respectively born in Illinois and Iowa, both to parents born in Ireland. He was the eldest of five children and three sons. He was a nephew of notorious kidnapper Pat Crowe, who abducted wealthy meatpacking heir Edward Cudahy Jr. in 1900. The family moved to Illinois sometime between 1892 and 1897, and by 1900 he was living in the River North district in what was then known as "Smokey Hollow" at what is now 400 North Wells Street, (Note: At the time, it was 35 Wells Street) across Kinzie Avenue from what was then Wells Street Station and would later become Merchandise Mart in a hotel owned and operated by his father. By 1910 the family moved up north to 753 North Dearborn Avenue, in another hotel owned by the elder Crowe known as the Dearborn Hotel. Dorsey would still be living there as of 1917, at which point he was also operating a real-estate business, and would work in the same building one address to the north at 755 North Dearborn at the start of his aldermanic tenure.

Crowe graduated from DePaul University, and joined the Army Air Service in 1917. He received preliminary aviation schooling at Cornell University and more detailed training at Kelly Field in San Antonio, reaching the rank of Second Lieutenant in 1918.

== Political career ==
For the entirety of his term of office Crowe was closely affiliated with the machine, and would gain a reputation as Boss of the 42nd ward.

Although usually associated with the machine, Crowe occasionally deflected from the administration. In two meetings of the Council in 1939 he consistently voted against the machine, bringing his nominal voting percentage of agreeing with it down to 17 percent. (Excluding those meetings, he voted for the machine 50 percent of the time in 1939.) In addition to his work as alderman, Crowe was an Illinois delegate to the 1936 Democratic National Convention, as well as an alternate delegate to the 1944 and 1952 conventions.

=== Entry into politics ===
As early as 1918 it has been claimed that Crowe first ran for alderman in 1915, but his name does not appear in the canvassing sheets that year for any of the primaries or the general election. He did run in 1916, winning the Democratic primary against John Prendergast but falling in the general election to Republican candidate Earl J. Walker, who was aided in part by society women who learned oratory for the purpose. Then, as in 1919, his family history was used against him, although the women also asserted that he had been floor manager for a hotel employees' ball that had turned into a drunken orgy. He would not run again in the Democratic primaries for either 1917 or 1918.

Crowe ran again in 1919. At that time he was serving as an Army aviator and had been injured the previous autumn while distributing propaganda for war bonds when his plane crashed and he fell 800 feet (240 m), in large part winning on a sympathy vote and defeating Republican incumbent Robert Hall McCormick (not to be confused with Robert R. McCormick, who had been Republican alderman of the same ward from 1904 to 1906), who was further perceived to have a very poor attendance record at the Council, 8,735 votes to 6,287.

Crowe was condemned during his campaign by the reform-focused Municipal Voters' League, who noted his relation to Pat Crowe, stated that "his place of residence and business, the Dearborn hotel, is operated by his father, and has been the scene of police raids," and did not mention Crowe's military service. Embittered by such attacks, he would after his victory proclaim that "I never want to know any of the Municipal Voters' league people. I never want them to support me, and I think I shall make a record they could support if they were honest. They vilified my family so terribly that I wish never to have anything to do with them."

At the time Crowe declared zoning to be his main passion, planning to stop factories from coming up on Lake Shore Drive and giving his zealous support for the Chicago Plan Commission. He also proposed to electrify all of the railway terminals in the city to reduce smoke and noise, and supported giving jobs to veterans returning from France. He had his first regular session with the rest of the new council on April 28.

=== Early years and 1920s ===
In his first year as alderman, Crowe was a member of the Judiciary, Streets and Alleys, and Building and City Hall committees of the Council. By 1920 he chaired the committee on Small Parks, Playgrounds, and Beaches. In 1921 he went on record to oppose a proposed blue law, quipping that "The proposed Sunday law is against all laws of common sense," a sentiment shared by many such fellow aldermen as 29th ward alderman and City Council Leader Thomas F. Byrne. In the aldermanic election that year the Municipal Voters' League would reverse its position on him, endorsing him as "[having] courage and show[ing] capacity for further good council service". On May 23, 1922, he was one of seven aldermen to call a special meeting of the Council to consider adding 1,000 patrolmen to the police force, which was ultimately approved. In 1920 aldermanic elections became nominally nonpartisan and Crowe's colleague and erstwhile rival Earl J. Walker was defeated in a runoff election by fellow Republican Charles J. Agnew.

From its incorporation in 1837, the City of Chicago had always been divided into wards which elected two aldermen each and which had numbered 35 by 1923. Both of Crowe's colleagues of the 21st Ward had been Republicans. In 1923 the number of aldermen allotted to each ward was reduced to one. Along with this change the number of wards was increased from 35 to 50 and Crowe's ward was renumbered the 42nd ward, the 21st ward designation being thenceforth applied to the eastern part of South Lawndale and western part of the Lower West Side represented by former 29th ward alderman Dennis A. Horan. The new 50-member Council convened on April 16.

Despite coming from a greatly anti-Prohibition area, in 1923 he voted against a resolution proposed by fellow Democratic alderman John Coughlin of the 1st ward that New York Governor Al Smith be commended for signing a prohibition enforcement repeal act and that Illinois to do the same. He claimed that the vote was because he didn't have enough time to consider the resolution, although prominent wet and Cook County Board of Commissioners President Anton Cermak insisted it was because Crowe wasn't allowed to introduce it, and criticized him and 43rd ward alderman Arthur F. Albert for voting against the resolution when their respective U.S. Representative Frederick A. Britten was leading the fight against the Volstead Act in Congress.

Throughout much of the 1920s, Republican "Big Bill" Thompson, who had connections to notorious mobster Al Capone, was the mayor of Chicago. Crowe was generally against Thompson; in 1923, he was supported by the Municipal Voters' League and several of the leading citizens of the area in the first election of the new one-alderman 42nd ward against his former colleague Charles J. Agnew, who was seen as a consistent supporter of Thompson. His opposition to Thompson notwithstanding, Crowe had his own connections to the mob. In 1920 he was one of many politicians present at mobster Big Jim Colosimo's funeral. He was also one of many officials implicated in receiving mafia kickbacks in the aftermath of a hit made on mob accountant Jack Zuta, his erstwhile law firm Crowe & Kolb having received and via a rubber stamp endorsed a check of $500 (Note: $7,200 in 2018) on September 4, 1925. Crowe denied knowing Zuta or anything about the check.

Despite such mob links, he endorsed, and his ward voted for, incumbent anti-mob and Prohibition-enforcing mayor William Emmett Dever in the 1927 election. In retaliation for such support, on April 4, the day before the election, his downtown office at the Burnham Building (currently known as the Bilandic Building, not to be confused with the current Burnham Center) was ransacked, allegedly by North Side Gang member Vincent "The Schemer" Drucci, among others. Invading the office while Crowe was himself absent, the attackers kicked out a window, knocked over file cabinets, and either scared or assaulted his secretary, although contemporary accounts place the invasion having taken place at night after the attackers assaulted a watchman to get keys. Upon his arrest Drucci created a scuffle with the police and was killed in the resulting shootout.

Crowe was not universally popular within the 42nd ward at this time. In particular, the reform-minded Chicago Tribune, whose headquarters were located within the ward, and his old enemy the Municipal Voters' League, despite its 1921 and 1923 reviews, continued to endorse his opponents throughout the decade. He was not particularly popular in the areas east of State Street, comprising the Republican-dominated Gold Coast and Streeterville. The importance of this opposition varied throughout the decade. In 1925, he crushed League-endorsed candidate Philip Farina 8,549 votes to 814. In 1929, however, he received 144 fewer votes than wealthy stockbroker and Deneen-backed reform Republican candidate Richard Prendergast (of unknown relation to John Prendergast from 1916) and was forced into a runoff, where he nonetheless defeated Prendergast with a comfortable 1,622-vote majority. The campaign was active and violent, involving such violence as fistfights and shootings, and Crowe's precinct captain Charles S. Brown would be found dead in September.

On June 2, 1929, Crowe was involved in an automobile accident in Lake Forest in which his vehicle was crowded into a ditch and he was thrown through the roof of the car and pinned in the wreckage before being saved by a passerby as it began to catch fire, suffering a concussion and being rendered unconscious for six hours. The injuries forced him to miss most Council business for the remainder of 1929.

=== Great Depression and World War II ===
The onset of the Great Depression initially spelled problems for Crowe, with seven rivals vying for his seat in 1931, at least two of whom – hoteliers Thomas Daniel Collins and Charles F. Henry – receiving significant support. However, even the Municipal Voters' League endorsed him, if weakly, over the inexperienced Henry. He would ultimately defeat all of his rivals in the first round with a 3,871-vote majority.

In 1939 the Municipal Voters' League disbanded and merged with the Citizens' Association of Chicago. By 1945 Crowe was the second-longest serving member of the Council (behind only future congressman James Bowler of the 25th ward, who had been serving since 1906), as well as the alderman with the longest continuous term of service (Bowler had been out of office between 1923 and 1927 and between 1934 and 1935), and was reported to be "one of the most popular men in the council".

=== Later years ===
Crowe continued to have dubious connections and engage in dubious practices throughout his tenure. As of 1947 he owned the Olympic Hotel operated by Harry Rubenstein, who was definitively linked to killing a man and suspected of killing two more. When accused of beating out two independent candidates in 1959 by paying each voter 50 cents, he is reported to have retorted "Madame, you can't get that done for 50 cents. It costs $5." (Note: Respectively $4 and $40 in 2018)

By 1960, the composition of the 42nd ward was changing, with an influx of recent immigrants from Mexico, Puerto Rico, and the Philippines, and a third of the voters being African-American. Regardless (if not because) of these demographic changes, Crowe's hold on the ward stayed as strong as it ever had been. The former Republican strongholds of the Gold Coast had become at least half Democratic as former mansions were turned into apartment buildings. Republicans at that point were "not considered of much importance in the general scheme of things". At this time Crowe was usually elected without the need of a runoff election. His good friend and longtime ward committeeman William J. Connors was known as "Old Reliable" due to his obedience to the wishes of the machine. Crowe himself was the president pro tempore of the Chicago City Council, a position he would hold until his death.

== Initiatives and contributions ==
=== Aviation ===
Having served in the Air Service, Crowe was interested in several projects concerning aviation. In 1924 he and Mayor Dever suggested to the Council that appropriations should be made to investigate various sites for an air field in Chicago. In 1928 as an alternative to the delayed project of a Downtown airport that would eventually become Meigs Field he proposed an airstrip on the site of then disused Oak Street Beach, which would continue into 1929. Neither of these proposals are known to have produced any results. He did, however, speak at the opening of what would later become Midway International Airport on May 8, 1926.

In 1921, as a member of the Aviation committee, Crowe insisted that a provision be added to a proposed Aviation bylaw prohibiting dirigibles using flammable gas from being flown over the city, action on which was deferred.

=== State Street ===
In 1939 the State Street Bridge over the Chicago River was removed so that the State Street subway could be constructed. Crowe complained that such removal, and other associated damage wrought by the subway construction, was ruining business on the thoroughfare. He also noted that a widening of the Street which had been planned in 1931 had not been followed through, which he also blamed on funding issues caused by the construction of the subway. Expressing disdain for a watered-down version of widening involving only sidewalk removal and not affecting the property lines and a fear that unsold bonds for the widening project would be used to pay damages incurred during construction of the viaduct, he suggested that the money be used to continue on with the street widening. This was a popular sentiment in the area; in February 1940, local property owner Donald M. Campbell, backed by the property-owners' North Central association, sued the City to enjoin it from pursuing the sidewalk-reduction plan and pursue the original 1931 scheme.

== Personal life and death ==
Crowe was a Catholic by faith, and his ward covered the Holy Name Cathedral, the primate Catholic church of the Chicago archdiocese. He moved to the Gold Coast sometime in the 1920s, living by 1929 at 65 East Bellevue Place with his mother, brothers Stephen A. and Orpheus E., aunt Frances C. Ryan, a servant, and a lodger. He would still be living there as of 1959. His aunt, who had lived with the family for all of his life and who had been involved in his real estate business in later years, died in 1931. In 1951 a safe weighing several hundred pounds and containing no cash but miscellaneous insurance policies, warranty deeds, and a $1,000 cashier's check made out to the Chicago Title and Trust company for use in a realty transaction, was stolen from his real-estate office.

He married attorney Mary G. Kelly in 1939 at Holy Name, with brother Stephen A. as the best man. He died of a heart attack on July 1, 1962, at Veterans Research Hospital. He had previously had a heart attack in 1953, and was taken to Chicago Wesley Memorial Hospital in critical condition in May 1961 after suffering another one. He was survived by widow Mary. Services were held the following Thursday on the 5th at Holy Name, where it was requested that flowers be omitted, and he was buried in the Catholic Queen of Heaven Cemetery. Mayor Richard J. Daley referred to him as "a great figure in the political life and the civic life of Chicago", while 31st ward alderman and Council floor leader Thomas E. Keane deemed him "[a man with] the courage to make a decision" and "[one who] helped shape the destiny of our city." City Hall was closed except for emergency services on the 4th through 1 p.m. on the 5th in his memory. Upon his death, Paddy Bauler of the neighboring 43rd ward, who had served from 1933 to 1943 and again since 1947, became the alderman with the longest service. Nevertheless, (Note: It is standard practice for the most senior alderman to be President pro tempore) the Council elected 37th ward alderman Paul T. Corcoran on August 31 to succeed Crowe as President pro tempore, while the office of 42nd ward alderman would remain vacant until future Circuit Court judge Mayer Goldberg assumed it on February 26, 1963.

== Selected electoral history ==
Crowe first ran for alderman in 1916, winning the Democratic primary but losing the general election.

1916 Chicago aldermanic election, 21st ward, Democratic primary
Party	Candidate	Votes	%
Democratic	Dorsey R. Crowe	3,526	64.07
Democratic	John Prendergast	1,977	35.93
Majority		1,549	28.15

1916 Chicago aldermanic election, 21st ward, general election
Party	Candidate	Votes	%
Republican	Earl J. Walker	6,385	51.50
Democratic	Dorsey R. Crowe	5,447	43.94
Socialist	Charles N. Andersen	460	3.71
Prohibition	Charles B. Hull	71	0.57
Progressive	William Splevenge	34	0.27
Majority		938	7.56

In 1929 he lost the first round of the election to Republican Richard Prendergast. However, in the resulting runoff he would handily defeat Prendergast. This was one of the last elections in which he was seriously contested.

1929 Chicago aldermanic election, 42nd ward, first round
Party	Candidate	Votes	%
Republican	Richard Prendergast	3,399	36.29
Democratic	Dorsey R. Crowe, incumbent	3,255	34.76
Unknown	C. R. Palmer	2,711	28.95
Majority		144	1.54

1929 Chicago aldermanic election, 42nd ward, runoff
Party	Candidate	Votes	%
Democratic	Dorsey R. Crowe, incumbent	6,063	57.72
Republican	Richard Prendergast	4,441	42.28
Majority		1,622	15.44
Democratic hold

== See also ==
- Paddy Bauler, a similarly corrupt alderman who served the neighboring 43rd ward during much of Crowe's term
- List of Chicago aldermen since 1923
