= J. Michael Dorsey =

American attorney and former government official

Acting United States Secretary of Housing and Urban Development
- In office January 20, 1989 – February 13, 1989
- President: George H. W. Bush
- Preceded by: Samuel Pierce
- Succeeded by: Jack Kemp

General Counsel of the Department of Housing and Urban Development
- In office March 12, 1987 – February 13, 1989
- President: Ronald Reagan
- Preceded by: John J. Knapp
- Succeeded by: Frank Keating

Assistant Secretary of Public and Indian Housing
- In office August 2, 1986 – July 13, 1990
- President: Ronald Reagan
- Preceded by: Warren T. Lindquist
- Succeeded by: Joseph G. Schiff

Personal details
- Born: February 6, 1943 (age 83) Kansas City, Missouri
- Party: Republican
- Education: Stanford University; University of Missouri

J. Michael Dorsey (born February 6, 1943) is a retired American attorney and administrator. He served as General Counsel of the U.S. Department of Housing and Urban Development (HUD) from 1987–1989, Administrative Counsel of the Office of the Chief Administrative Officer of the U.S. House of Representatives (CAO) from 1995–2003, and Chief of Administrative Services of the U.S. Department of Homeland Security (DHS) from 2003–2004. He was briefly Acting Secretary of Housing and Urban Development in 1989 during the transition from the Reagan to the Bush administrations.

== Early life and education ==
Dorsey was born in Kansas City, Missouri, on February 6, 1943. He graduated from Stanford University with a BA in 1965, and from the University of Missouri with a JD in 1968 and an LLM in 1973.

== Legal and political career ==
Dorsey worked as the Legal Aid and Defender Society of Greater Kansas City as an assistant director, managing attorney, and staff attorney, from 1969 to 1973. In 1973, he began working for a year as Assistant Attorney General of Missouri, under John Danforth. In 1974, he became a partner at the law firm of Stinson, Mag & Fizzell in Kansas City, Missouri.

In May 1986, Dorsey was nominated by Ronald Reagan to serve as Assistant Secretary of Public and Indian Housing at the Department of Housing and Urban Development (HUD), in place of Warren T. Lindquist who had resigned. Dorsey was confirmed by the U.S. Senate by voice vote on August 2, 1986. During his time as Assistant Secretary, he described housing vouchers as "the centerpiece of the Reagan housing program" to the Chicago Tribune.

In January 1987, Dorsey was nominated as General Counsel of HUD, to succeed John J. Knapp. He was confirmed in the Senate by voice vote on March 12, 1987. As General Counsel, Dorsey formed part of the selection committee for public money for housing, alongside Thomas Demery and Carl Covitz. The committee was the subject of controversy when a federal audit released in 1989 said that most of the money approved by it went to developers with HUD connections. It said that Dorsey and Covitz typically agreed to suggestions that Demery made. He briefly served as Acting Secretary of HUD in 1989, prior to Jack Kemp assuming the role. On July 13, 1989, Frank Keating was confirmed as General Counsel, succeeding Dorsey. On July 13, 1990, Joseph G. Schiff was confirmed as Assistant Secretary in place of Dorsey.

Dorsey became Administrative Counsel of the newly-formed Office of the Chief Administrative Officer of the United States House of Representatives when it was formed in 1995. His tenure lasted from January 1, 1995 to February 14, 2003. During some of that time he served as Acting Associate Administrator. Dorsey became Chief of Administrative Services of the newly-founded United States Department of Homeland Security on February 15, 2003, serving until June 11, 2004. In this role, he was subordinate to the Under Secretary for Management, Janet Hale.

== Personal life and retirement ==
Dorsey is married and had two children. He retired to the town of Boulder, Colorado.
