= August Dorley =

- Born: 1842; Germany
- Died: October 17, 1867 (aged 24–25); Natchez, Mississippi, US
- Burial place: Natchez City Cemetery
- Military career
- Allegiance: United States of America
- Branch: United States Army
- Rank: Private
- Unit: 1st Louisiana Cavalry Regiment
- Awards: Medal of Honor

August Dorley (also August Doerle) (1842 – October 17, 1867) was a German soldier who fought in the American Civil War. Dorley received the United States' highest award for bravery during combat, the Medal of Honor, for his action at Mount Pleasant, Alabama, on 11 April 1865.

== Biography ==
Dorley was born in Germany in 1842. He enlisted into the 1st Louisiana Cavalry. He died on 17 October 1867, and his remains are interred at the Natchez City Cemetery in Natchez, Mississippi.

== Medal of Honor citation ==
Capture of flag.

== See also ==
- List of American Civil War Medal of Honor recipients: A–F
