= 1971 European Athletics Championships – Women's 4 × 100 metres relay =

Women's 4 × 100 metres relay at the European Athletics Championships

The women's 4 × 100 metres relay at the 1971 European Athletics Championships was held in Helsinki, Finland, at Helsinki Olympic Stadium on 14 and 15 August 1971.

== Medalists ==
| Gold | Elfgard Schittenhelm; Inge Helten; Annegret Richter; Ingrid Mickler; West Germany |
| Silver | Karin Balzer; Renate Stecher; Petra Vogt; Ellen Stropahl; East Germany |
| Bronze | Lyudmila Zharkova; Galina Bukharina; Marina Sidorova; Nadezhda Besfamilnaya; Soviet Union |

== Results ==
=== Final ===
15 August

| Rank | Nation | Competitors | Time | Notes |
|---|---|---|---|---|
| 1st place, gold medalist(s) | West Germany | Elfgard Schittenhelm; Inge Helten; Annegret Richter; Ingrid Mickler | 43.28 | AR |
| 2nd place, silver medalist(s) | East Germany | Karin Balzer; Renate Stecher; Petra Vogt; Ellen Stropahl | 43.62 | |
| 3rd place, bronze medalist(s) | Soviet Union | Lyudmila Zharkova; Galina Bukharina; Marina Sidorova; Nadezhda Besfamilnaya | 44.45 | |
| 4 | Poland | Danuta Jędrejek; Barbara Bakulin; Urszula Jóźwik; Helena Fliśnik | 44.75 | |
| 5 | Hungary | Ilona Bruzsenyák; Margit Nemesházi; Györgyi Balogh; Katalin Papp | 44.78 | |
| 6 | Great Britain | Val Peat; Margaret Critchley; Madeleine Cobb; Elizabeth Johns | 44.87 | |
| 7 | France | Gabrielle Meyer; Michèle Beugnet; Nicole Pani; Odette Ducas | 45.50 | |
| 8 | Sweden | Anneli Olsson; Gun Olsson; Karin Lundgren; Elisabeth Randerz | 46.12 | |

=== Heats ===
14 August

==== Heat 1 ====
| Rank | Nation | Competitors | Time | Notes |
|---|---|---|---|---|
| 1 | West Germany | Elfgard Schittenhelm; Inge Helten; Annegret Richter; Ingrid Mickler | 44.37 | Q |
| 2 | Soviet Union | Lyudmila Zharkova; Galina Bukharina; Marina Sidorova; Nadezhda Besfamilnaya | 44.62 | Q |
| 3 | Poland | Danuta Jędrejek; Barbara Bakulin; Urszula Jóźwik; Helena Fliśnik | 44.75 | Q |
| 4 | Sweden | Anneli Olsson; Gun Olsson; Karin Lundgren; Elisabeth Randerz | 45.30 | NR Q |
| 5 | Italy | Maddalena Grassano; Alessandra Orselli; Laura Nappi; Cecilia Molinari | 45.71 | |

==== Heat 2 ====
| Rank | Nation | Competitors | Time | Notes |
|---|---|---|---|---|
| 1 | East Germany | Karin Balzer; Renate Stecher; Petra Vogt; Ellen Stropahl | 44.13 | Q |
| 2 | Hungary | Ilona Bruzsenyák; Margit Nemesházi; Györgyi Balogh; Katalin Papp | 44.87 | Q |
| 3 | Great Britain | Val Peat; Margaret Critchley; Madeleine Cobb; Elizabeth Johns | 45.09 | Q |
| 4 | France | Gabrielle Meyer; Michèle Beugnet; Nicole Pani; Odette Ducas | 45.63 | Q |
| 5 | Austria | Karoline Käfer; Christine Kepplinger; Monika Holzschuster; Helga Kapfer | 45.82 | NR |

== Participation ==
According to an unofficial count, 40 athletes from 10 countries participated in the event.

- Austria (4)
- East Germany (4)
- France (4)
- Hungary (4)
- Italy (4)
- Poland (4)
- Soviet Union (4)
- Sweden (4)
- Great Britain (4)
- West Germany (4)
