= 1971 European Athletics Championships – Women's 100 metres =

Women's 100 metres at the 1971 European Athletics Championships
- Venue: Helsinki Olympic Stadium
- Location: Helsinki
- Dates: 10 August (heats); 11 August (semifinals & final)
- Competitors: 20 from 11 nations
- Winning time: 11.35

Medalists
gold medal	Renate Stecher	East Germany
silver medal	Ingrid Mickler	West Germany
bronze medal	Elfgard Schittenhelm	West Germany

The women's 100 metres at the 1971 European Athletics Championships was held in Helsinki, Finland, at Helsinki Olympic Stadium on 10 and 11 August 1971.

== Participation ==
According to an unofficial count, 20 athletes from 11 countries participated in the event.

- Austria (1)
- East Germany (3)
- France (1)
- Hungary (2)
- Italy (1)
- Netherlands (1)
- Poland (3)
- Soviet Union (1)
- Switzerland (1)
- Great Britain (3)
- West Germany (3)

== Results ==
=== Heats ===
10 August

==== Heat 1 ====
Rank	Name	Nationality	Time	Notes
1	Irena Szewińska	Poland	11.84	Q
2	Anita Neil	Great Britain	11.85	Q
3	Monika Meyer	East Germany	11.86	Q
4	Wilma van den Berg	Netherlands	11.88	Q
5	Margit Nemesházi	Hungary	12.10	
			Wind: -1.6 m/s	

==== Heat 2 ====
Rank	Name	Nationality	Time	Notes
1	Elfgard Schittenhelm	West Germany	11.53	Q
2	Györgyi Balogh	Hungary	11.68	Q
3	Petra Vogt	East Germany	11.73	Q
4	Meta Antenen	Switzerland	11.79	Q
5	Elizabeth Johns	Great Britain	11.86	
			Wind: -1.0 m/s	

==== Heat 3 ====
Rank	Name	Nationality	Time	Notes
1	Ingrid Mickler	West Germany	11.56	Q
2	Lyudmila Zharkova	Soviet Union	11.82	Q
3	Cecilia Molinari	Italy	11.90	Q
4	Danuta Jędrejek	Poland	11.92	Q
5	Helga Kapfer	Austria	11.99	
6	Val Peat	Great Britain	12.07	
			Wind: -0.9 m/s	

==== Heat 4 ====
Rank	Name	Nationality	Time	Notes
1	Renate Stecher	East Germany	11.42	CR Q
2	Inge Helten	West Germany	11.66	Q
3	Sylviane Telliez	France	11.91	Q
4	Helena Fliśnik	Poland	11.97	Q
			Wind: -0.8 m/s	

=== Semi-finals ===
11 August

==== Semi-final 1 ====
Rank	Name	Nationality	Time	Notes
1	Ingrid Mickler	West Germany	11.53	Q
2	Elfgard Schittenhelm	West Germany	11.56	Q
3	Irena Szewińska	Poland	11.75	Q
4	Petra Vogt	East Germany	11.78	Q
5	Cecilia Molinari	Italy	11.92	
6	Lyudmila Zharkova	Soviet Union	11.94	
7	Danuta Jędrejek	Poland	12.00	
	Sylviane Telliez	France	DNS	
			Wind: -1.1 m/s	

==== Semi-final 2 ====
Wind: 0.1 m/s

Rank	Name	Nationality	Time	Notes
1	Renate Stecher	East Germany	11.50	Q
2	Inge Helten	West Germany	11.61	Q
3	Györgyi Balogh	Hungary	11.68	Q
4	Anita Neil	Great Britain	11.70	Q
5	Monika Meyer	East Germany	11.78	
6	Helena Fliśnik	Poland	11.97	
7	Wilma van den Berg	Netherlands	12.05	
	Meta Antenen	Switzerland	DNS	
			Wind: +0.1 m/s	

=== Final ===
11 August

Rank	Name	Nationality	Time	Notes
1st place, gold medalist(s)	Renate Stecher	East Germany	11.35	CR
2nd place, silver medalist(s)	Ingrid Mickler	West Germany	11.46	
3rd place, bronze medalist(s)	Elfgard Schittenhelm	West Germany	11.51	
4	Inge Helten	West Germany	11.55	
5	Györgyi Balogh	Hungary	11.59	
6	Irena Szewińska	Poland	11.63	
7	Petra Vogt	East Germany	11.71	
8	Anita Neil	Great Britain	11.75	
			Wind: 0.0 m/s	
