= 1966 European Athletics Championships – Women's 4 × 100 metres relay =

Women's 4 × 100 metres relay at the European Athletics Championships

The women's 4 × 100 metres relay at the 1966 European Athletics Championships was held in Budapest, Hungary, at Népstadion on 3 and 4 September 1966.

== Medalists ==
Gold	Elżbieta Bednarek; Danuta Straszyńska; Irena Kirszenstein; Ewa Kłobukowska; Poland
Silver	Renate Meyer; Hannelore Trabert; Karin Frisch; Jutta Stöck; West Germany
Bronze	Vera Popkova; Valentyna Bolshova; Lyudmila Samotyosova; Renāte Lāce; Soviet Union

== Results ==
=== Final ===
4 September

Rank	Nation	Competitors	Time	Notes
1st place, gold medalist(s)	Poland	Elżbieta Bednarek; Danuta Straszyńska; Irena Kirszenstein; Ewa Kłobukowska	44.49	CR
2nd place, silver medalist(s)	West Germany	Renate Meyer; Hannelore Trabert; Karin Frisch; Jutta Stöck	44.60	NR
3rd place, bronze medalist(s)	Soviet Union	Vera Popkova; Valentyna Bolshova; Lyudmila Samotyosova; Renāte Lāce	44.70	
4	Hungary	Margit Nemesházi; Erzsébet Bartos; Annamária Tóth; Ida Such	45.1	
5	East Germany	Renate Heldt; Ingrid Tiedtke; Ursula Böhm; Christina Heinich	45.3	
6	Great Britain	Maureen Tranter; Janet Simpson; Daphne Slater; Jill Hall	45.4	
7	Netherlands	Truus Hennipman; Martha Klaasen Bos; Wilma van den Berg; Lidy Vonk	45.6	
8	France	Danièle Guéneau; Sylviane Telliez; Gabrielle Meyer; Nicole Montandon	45.7	NR

=== Heats ===
3 September

==== Heat 1 ====
Rank	Nation	Competitors	Time	Notes
1	Poland	Elżbieta Bednarek; Danuta Straszyńska; Irena Kirszenstein; Ewa Kłobukowska	44.7	Q
2	East Germany	Christina Heinich; Renate Heldt; Ingrid Tiedtke; Ursula Böhm	45.3	Q
3	Hungary	Margit Nemesházi; Erzsébet Bartos; Annamária Tóth; Ida Such	45.3	Q
4	Great Britain	Maureen Tranter; Janet Simpson; Daphne Slater; Jill Hall	45.6	Q
5	Norway	Maj Lena Andersen; Tove Bakkejord; Berit Berthelsen; Kirsten Rothe	45.9	NR

==== Heat 2 ====
Rank	Nation	Competitors	Time	Notes
1	West Germany	Hannelore Trabert; Jutta Stöck; Renate Meyer; Karin Frisch	44.9	Q
2	Soviet Union	Renāte Lāce; Valentyna Bolshova; Lyudmila Samotyosova; Vera Popkova	45.0	Q
3	France	Danièle Guéneau; Sylviane Telliez; Gabrielle Meyer; Nicole Montandon	45.8	NR Q
4	Netherlands	Truus Hennipman; Martha Klaasen Bos; Wilma van den Berg; Lidy Vonk	45.9	Q
5	Czechoslovakia	Eva Lehocká; Eva Kucmanová; Vlasta Přikrylová; Alena Hiltscherova	46.0	

== Participation ==
According to an unofficial count, 40 athletes from 10 countries participated in the event.

- Czechoslovakia (4)
- East Germany (4)
- France (4)
- Hungary (4)
- Netherlands (4)
- Norway (4)
- Poland (4)
- Soviet Union (4)
- Great Britain (4)
- West Germany (4)
