= 1971 European Athletics Championships – Women's 200 metres =

Women's 200 metres at the European Athletics Championships

The women's 200 metres at the 1971 European Athletics Championships was held in Helsinki, Finland, at Helsinki Olympic Stadium on 12 and 13 August 1971.

== Medalists ==
Gold	Renate Stecher; East Germany
Silver	Györgyi Balogh; Hungary
Bronze	Irena Szewińska; Poland

== Results ==
=== Final ===
13 August Wind: 0.0 m/s

Rank	Name	Nationality	Time	Notes
1st place, gold medalist(s)	Renate Stecher	East Germany	22.70	CR
2nd place, silver medalist(s)	Györgyi Balogh	Hungary	23.26	
3rd place, bronze medalist(s)	Irena Szewińska	Poland	23.32	
4	Nadezhda Besfamilnaya	Soviet Union	23.42	
5	Annegret Kroniger	West Germany	23.62	
6	Rita Wilden	West Germany	23.62	
7	Ellen Stropahl	East Germany	23.63	
8	Christina Heinich	East Germany	23.73	

=== Semi-finals ===
12 August

==== Semi-final 1 ====
Wind: 0 m/s

Rank	Name	Nationality	Time	Notes
1	Annegret Kroniger	West Germany	23.37	Q
2	Györgyi Balogh	Hungary	23.42	Q
3	Rita Wilden	West Germany	23.50	Q
4	Christina Heinich	East Germany	23.62	Q
5	Urszula Jóźwik	Poland	24.01	
6	Wilma van den Berg	Netherlands	24.02	
7	Gabrielle Meyer	France	24.31	

==== Semi-final 2 ====
Wind: 0 m/s

Rank	Name	Nationality	Time	Notes
1	Renate Stecher	East Germany	23.26	Q
2	Irena Szewińska	Poland	23.54	Q
3	Nadezhda Besfamilnaya	Soviet Union	23.60	Q
4	Ellen Stropahl	East Germany	23.68	Q
5	Margaret Critchley	Great Britain	23.91	
6	Trudy Ruth	Netherlands	23.92	
7	Helga Kapfer	Austria	24.11	
8	Annelie Wilden	West Germany	24.46	

=== Heats ===
12 August

==== Heat 1 ====
Wind: 0 m/s

Rank	Name	Nationality	Time	Notes
1	Renate Stecher	East Germany	23.83	Q
2	Wilma van den Berg	Netherlands	24.13	Q
3	Helga Kapfer	Austria	24.15	Q
4	Margaret Critchley	Great Britain	24.21	Q
5	Barbara Bakulin	Poland	24.57	

==== Heat 2 ====
Wind: -0.2 m/s

Rank	Name	Nationality	Time	Notes
1	Annegret Kroniger	West Germany	23.83	Q
2	Ellen Stropahl	East Germany	23.85	Q
3	Irena Szewińska	Poland	25.61	Q

==== Heat 3 ====
Wind: 0 m/s

Rank	Name	Nationality	Time	Notes
1	Christina Heinich	East Germany	23.82	Q
2	Trudy Ruth	Netherlands	23.98	Q
3	Györgyi Balogh	Hungary	24.32	Q
4	Annelie Wilden	West Germany	24.51	Q
5	Elisabeth Randerz	Sweden	24.81	

==== Heat 4 ====
Wind: 0 m/s

Rank	Name	Nationality	Time	Notes
1	Rita Wilden	West Germany	23.64	Q
2	Nadezhda Besfamilnaya	Soviet Union	23.74	Q
3	Urszula Jóźwik	Poland	24.14	Q
4	Gabrielle Meyer	France	24.25	Q
5	Karin Lundgren	Sweden	24.61	
6	Della Pascoe	Great Britain	24.66	

== Participation ==
According to an unofficial count, 20 athletes from 10 countries participated in the event.

- Austria (1)
- East Germany (3)
- France (1)
- Hungary (1)
- Netherlands (2)
- Poland (4)
- Soviet Union (1)
- Sweden (2)
- Great Britain (2)
- West Germany (3)
