= Athletics at the 1965 Summer Universiade – Women's 4 × 100 metres relay =

The women's 4 × 100 metres relay event at the 1965 Summer Universiade was held at the People's Stadium in Budapest on 29 August 1965.

== Results ==
Rank	Nation	Athletes	Time	Notes
1st place, gold medalist(s)	Soviet Union	Vera Popkova, Renāte Lāce, Tatyana Shchelkanova, Lyudmila Samotyosova	45.5	UR
2nd place, silver medalist(s)	Poland (POL)	Irena Kirszenstein, Mirosława Sałacińska, Danuta Straszyńska, Irena Woldańska	46.1	
3rd place, bronze medalist(s)	Hungary	Irén Buskó, Annamária Kovács, Ildikó Jónás, Ida Such	46.4	
4	Great Britain	Susan Hayward, Lorna McGarvey, Sheila Parkin, Liz Gill	46.8	
5	West Germany	Marlies Fünfstück, Gabriele Grossekettler, Gerlinde Beyrichen, Dorothee Sander	46.9	
