= 1974 European Athletics Championships – Women's 100 metres =

Women's 100 metres at the 1974 European Athletics Championships
- Venue: Stadio Olimpico
- Location: Rome
- Dates: 2 September (heats); 3 September (semifinals & final)
- Competitors: 23 from 12 nations
- Winning time: 11.13

Medalists
gold medal	Irena Szewińska	Poland
silver medal	Renate Stecher	East Germany
bronze medal	Andrea Lynch	Great Britain

The women's 100 metres at the 1974 European Athletics Championships was held in Rome, Italy, at Stadio Olimpico on 2 and 3 September 1974.

== Participation ==
According to an unofficial count, 23 athletes from 12 countries participated in the event.

- Austria (1)
- East Germany (3)
- Finland (1)
- France (1)
- Hungary (2)
- Italy (3)
- Netherlands (1)
- Poland (2)
- Soviet Union (2)
- Sweden (1)
- Great Britain (3)
- West Germany (3)

== Results ==
=== Heats ===
2 September

==== Heat 1 ====
Rank	Name	Nationality	Time	Notes
1	Renate Stecher	East Germany	11.54	Q
2	Sonia Lannaman	Great Britain	11.76	Q
3	Linda Haglund	Sweden	11.81	Q
4	Wilma van den Berg	Netherlands	11.95	q
5	Cecilia Molinari	Italy	11.95	
6	Brigitte Haest	Austria	12.03	
			Wind: -0.9 m/s	

==== Heat 2 ====
Rank	Name	Nationality	Time	Notes
1	Irena Szewińska	Poland	11.39	Q
2	Lyudmila Maslakova	Soviet Union	11.54	Q
3	Bärbel Eckert	East Germany	11.63	Q
4	Elfgard Schittenhelm	West Germany	11.75	q
5	Rita Bottiglieri	Italy	12.08	
6	Judit Szabó	Hungary	12.40	
	Maroula Lambrou	Greece	DNS	
			Wind: +0.4 m/s	

==== Heat 3 ====
Rank	Name	Nationality	Time	Notes
1	Mona-Lisa Pursiainen	Finland	11.31	CR, Q
2	Inge Helten	West Germany	11.56	Q
3	Helen Golden	Great Britain	11.67	Q
4	Zsuzsa Karoly	Hungary	12.22	
5	Sylviane Telliez	France	12.98	
	Marina Sidorova	Soviet Union	DNS	
			Wind: +0.8 m/s	

==== Heat 4 ====
Rank	Name	Nationality	Time	Notes
1	Andrea Lynch	Great Britain	11.39	Q
2	Annegret Richter	West Germany	11.41	Q
3	Christina Heinich	East Germany	11.58	Q
4	Tatyana Chernikova	Soviet Union	11.79	q
5	Danuta Jędrejek	Poland	11.92	q
6	Laura Nappi	Italy	12.01	
			Wind: -0.8 m/s	

=== Semi-finals ===
3 September

==== Semi-final 1 ====
Rank	Name	Nationality	Time	Notes
1	Mona-Lisa Pursiainen	Finland	11.34	Q
2	Annegret Richter	West Germany	11.34	Q
3	Renate Stecher	East Germany	11.38	Q
4	Christina Heinich	East Germany	11.48	Q
5	Sonia Lannaman	Great Britain	11.53	
6	Helen Golden	Great Britain	11.59	
7	Tatyana Chernikova	Soviet Union	11.75	
8	Danuta Jędrejek	Poland	11.90	
			Wind: -0.8 m/s	

==== Semi-final 2 ====
Rank	Name	Nationality	Time	Notes
1	Irena Szewińska	Poland	11.15	CR, NR, Q
2	Lyudmila Maslakova	Soviet Union	11.35	Q
3	Bärbel Eckert	East Germany	11.43	Q
4	Andrea Lynch	Great Britain	11.46	Q
5	Elfgard Schittenhelm	West Germany	11.49	
6	Inge Helten	West Germany	11.65	
7	Wilma van den Berg	Netherlands	11.70	
8	Linda Haglund	Sweden	11.72	
			Wind: -1.3 m/s	

=== Final ===
3 September

Rank	Name	Nationality	Time	Notes
1st place, gold medalist(s)	Irena Szewińska	Poland	11.13	CR, NR
2nd place, silver medalist(s)	Renate Stecher	East Germany	11.23	
3rd place, bronze medalist(s)	Andrea Lynch	Great Britain	11.28	
4	Lyudmila Maslakova	Soviet Union	11.36	
5	Annegret Richter	West Germany	11.36	
6	Mona-Lisa Pursiainen	Finland	11.42	
7	Bärbel Eckert	East Germany	11.46	
8	Christina Heinich	East Germany	11.63	
			Wind: -1.2 m/s	
