= 1970 European Cup (athletics) =

- Host city: Stockholm, Sweden (men); Budapest, Hungary (women)
- Level: Senior
- Type: Outdoor
- Events: 33

The 1970 European Cup was the 3rd edition of the European Cup of athletics.

The Finals were held in Stockholm, Sweden (men) and Budapest, Hungary (women). It was the last time that men's and women's competition was held at a different time and place.

== Final ==
Held on 29 and 30 August in Stockholm (men) and on 22 August (women) in Budapest.

=== Team standings ===
Men
Pos.	Nation	Points
1	East Germany	102
2	Soviet Union	92,5
3	West Germany	91
4	Poland	82
5	France	77,5
6	Sweden	68
7	Italy	47

Women
Pos.	Nation	Points
1	East Germany	70
2	West Germany	63
3	Soviet Union	43
4	Poland	35
5	Great Britain	34
6	Hungary	32

=== Results summary ===
==== Men's events ====
Event	Gold		Silver		Bronze	
100 m (Wind: +1.0 m/s)	Zenon Nowosz; Poland	10.4	Siegfried Schenke; East Germany	10.5	Gerhard Wucherer; West Germany	10.5
200 m (Wind: +5.8 m/s)	Siegfried Schenke; East Germany	20.7w	Jochen Eigenherr; West Germany	20.9w	Zenon Nowosz; Poland	21.0w
400 m	Jan Werner; Poland	45.9	Jean-Claude Nallet; France	46.3	Boris Savchuk; Soviet Union	46.7
800 m	Yevgeniy Arzhanov; Soviet Union	1:47.8	Franz-Josef Kemper; West Germany	1:48.6	Andrzej Kupczyk; Poland	1:48.7
1500 m	Franco Arese; Italy	3:42.3	Henryk Szordykowski; Poland	3:42.5	Jean Wadoux; France	3:42.6
5000 m	Harald Norpoth; West Germany	14:25.4	Gerd Eisenberg; East Germany	14:25.6	Rashid Sharafetdinov; Soviet Union	14:25.8
10,000 m	Jürgen Haase; East Germany	28:26.8; CR	Nikolay Sviridov; Soviet Union	28:29.2	Manfred Letzerich; West Germany	28:40.0
3000 m steeplechase	Vladimir Dudin; Soviet Union	8:31.6; CR	Ulrich Holbeck; East Germany	8:36.0	Kazimierz Maranda; Poland	8:38.0
110 m hurdles (Wind: +0.5 m/s)	Guy Drut; France	13.7; CR	Bo Forssander; Sweden	14.0	Günther Nickel; West Germany	14.0
400 m hurdles	Jean-Claude Nallet; France	50.1; CR	Werner Reibert; West Germany	51.0	Dmitriy Stukalov; Soviet Union	51.2
4 × 100 m	East Germany; Hans-Jürgen Bombach; Joachim Walther; Hermann Burde; Harald Eggers	39.4	Poland; Stanisław Wagner; Tadeusz Cuch; Edward Romanowski; Zenon Nowosz	39.5	West Germany; Günther Nickel; Jochen Eigenherr; Gerhard Wucherer; Josef Schwarz	39.6
4 × 400 m	Poland; Jan Werner; Edmund Borowski; Jan Balachowski; Andrzej Badeński	3:05.1	Soviet Union; Yevgeniy Borisenko; Yuriy Zorin; Boris Savchuk; Aleksandr Bratchikov	3:06.3	East Germany; Rainer Friedrich; Andreas Scheibe; Michael Zerbes; Wolfgang Müller	3:07.1
High jump	Kenneth Lundmark; Sweden	2.15; CR	Valentin Gavrilov; Soviet Union; Gérard Lamy; France	2.13		
Pole vault	Wolfgang Nordwig; East Germany	5.35; CR	Renato Dionisi; Italy	5.20	François Tracanelli; France	5.15
Long jump	Jack Pani; France	8.09	Klaus Beer; East Germany	8.07	Josef Schwarz; West Germany	7.99
Triple jump	Jörg Drehmel; East Germany	17.13; CR	Viktor Sanyeyev; Soviet Union	17.01	Józef Schmidt; Poland	16.65
Shot put	Hartmut Briesenick; East Germany	20.55	Heinfried Birlenbach; West Germany	19.54	Pierre Colnard; France	19.44
Discus throw	Ricky Bruch; Sweden	64.86; CR	Hein-Direck Neu; West Germany	61.40	Vladimir Lyakhov; Soviet Union	59.26
Hammer throw	Anatoliy Bondarchuk; Soviet Union	70.46	Uwe Beyer; West Germany	69.46	Reinhard Theimer; East Germany	69.32
Javelin throw	Władysław Nikiciuk; Poland	82.46	Jānis Lūsis; Soviet Union	81.74	Klaus Wolfermann; West Germany	80.90
WR world record | AR area record | CR championship record | GR games record | NR national record | OR Olympic record | PB personal best | SB season best | WL world leading (in a given season)

==== Women's events ====
Event	Gold		Silver		Bronze	
100 m (Wind: +0.3 m/s)	Ingrid Mickler; West Germany	11.3	Renate Meissner; East Germany	11.4	Györgyi Balogh; Hungary	11.6
200 m (Wind: +0.2 m/s)	Renate Meissner; East Germany	23.1	Ingrid Mickler; West Germany	23.3	Györgyi Balogh; Hungary	23.3
400 m	Helga Fischer; East Germany	53.2; CR	Christel Frese; West Germany	54.1	Vera Popkova; Soviet Union	54.0
800 m	Hildegard Janze; West Germany	2:04.9	Sheila Carey; Great Britain	2:05.3	Barbara Wieck; East Germany	2:05.4
1500 m	Ellen Tittel; West Germany	4:16.3	Gunhild Hoffmeister; East Germany	4:16.5	Lyudmila Bragina; Soviet Union	4:17.2
100 m hurdles (Wind: -0.4 m/s)	Karin Balzer; East Germany	13.1	Teresa Sukniewicz; Poland	13.2	Margit Bach; West Germany	13.7
4 × 100 m	West Germany; Elfgard Schittenhelm; Annelie Wilden; Rita Jahn; Ingrid Mickler	43.9; CR	East Germany; Renate Meissner; Christina Heinich; Bärbel Schrickel; Marion Wagner	44.5	Hungary; Erzsébet Bartos; Judit Szabó; Györgyi Balogh; Katalin Papp	44.8
4 × 400 m	East Germany; Helga Fischer; Renate Marder; Brigitte Rohde; Monika Zehrt	3:37.0	West Germany; Christel Frese; Christa Czekay; Inge Eckhoff; Heidi Gerhard	3:37.2	Great Britain; Rosemary Stirling; Maureen Tranter; Val Peat; Helen Golden	3:37.8
High jump	Rita Schmidt; East Germany	1.84; CR	Antonina Lazareva; Soviet Union	1.84; CR	Karen Mack; West Germany	1.76
Long jump	Heide Rosendahl; West Germany	6.80; NR, CR	Ann Wilson; Great Britain	6.57w	Margrit Herbst; East Germany	6.44
Shot put	Nadezhda Chizhova; Soviet Union	19.42	Hannelore Friedel; East Germany	18.01	Ludwika Chewińska; Poland	17.01
Discus throw	Karin Illgen; East Germany	61.60; CR	Liesel Westermann; West Germany	61.44	Tamara Danilova; Soviet Union	57.84
Javelin throw	Ruth Fuchs; East Germany	60.60; CR	Daniela Jaworska; Poland	55.90	Marite Saulite; Soviet Union	54.52
WR world record | AR area record | CR championship record | GR games record | NR national record | OR Olympic record | PB personal best | SB season best | WL world leading (in a given season)

== Semifinals ==
=== Men ===
All semifinals were held on 1 and 2 August. First two teams advanced to the final. Sweden advanced as the host of the final.

Semifinal 1
Held in Sarajevo, Yugoslavia

Pos.	Nation	Points
1	West Germany	97
2	Italy	82.5
3	Czechoslovakia	76
4	Hungary	65.5
5	Yugoslavia	58
6	Bulgaria	40

Semifinal 2
Held in Helsinki, Finland

Pos.	Nation	Points
1	East Germany	99
2	Poland	92
3	Finland	81
4	Sweden	65
5	Norway	48
6	Belgium	35

Semifinal 3
Held in Zürich, Switzerland

Pos.	Nation	Points
1	France	97
1	Soviet Union	97
3	Great Britain	68
4	Spain	60
5	Switzerland	55
6	Romania	42

=== Women ===
All semifinals were held on 22 August. First two teams advanced to the final.

Semifinal 1
Held in East Berlin, East Germany

Pos.	Nation	Points
1	East Germany	84
2	Great Britain	73
3	Netherlands	58
4	France	55
5	Denmark	34
6	Finland	32
7	Norway	28

Semifinal 2
Held in Herford, West Germany

Pos.	Nation	Points
1	West Germany	74
2	Hungary	52
3	Bulgaria	48
4	Sweden	46
5	Yugoslavia	32
6	Belgium	21

Semifinal 3
Held in Bucharest, Romania

Pos.	Nation	Points
1	Soviet Union	79
2	Poland	71
3	Romania	66
4	Italy	47
5	Czechoslovakia	38
6	Switzerland	35
7	Austria	28

== Preliminaries ==
=== Men ===
All preliminaries were held on 20–21 June. First two teams advanced to the semifinals.

Preliminary 1
Held in Barcelona

Pos.	Nation	Points
1	Spain	64
2	Romania	50
3	Netherlands	44
4	Greece	41

Preliminary 2
Held in Vienna

Pos.	Nation	Points
1	Yugoslavia	68
2	Bulgaria	59
3	Austria	47
4	Luxembourg	23

Preliminary 3
Held in Reykjavík

Pos.	Nation	Points
1	Finland	81
2	Belgium	69
3	Denmark	60
4	Ireland	53
5	Iceland	37
