= 1969 European Athletics Championships – Women's 200 metres =

Women's 200 metres at the European Athletics Championships

The women's 200 metres at the 1969 European Athletics Championships was held in Athens, Greece, at Georgios Karaiskakis Stadium on 18 and 19 September 1969.

== Medalists ==
Gold	Petra Vogt; East Germany
Silver	Renate Meissner; East Germany
Bronze	Val Peat; Great Britain

== Results ==
=== Final ===
19 September Wind: 0.6 m/s

Rank	Name	Nationality	Time	Notes
1st place, gold medalist(s)	Petra Vogt	East Germany	23.30	
2nd place, silver medalist(s)	Renate Meissner	East Germany	23.33	
3rd place, bronze medalist(s)	Val Peat	Great Britain	23.34	
4	Wilma van den Berg	Netherlands	23.59	
5	Gabrielle Meyer	France	23.80	
6	Mariana Goth	Romania	23.98	
7	Else Hadrup	Denmark	24.01	
8	Madeleine Cobb	Great Britain	24.16	

=== Semi-finals ===
18 September

==== Semi-final 1 ====
Wind: -1.6 m/s

Rank	Name	Nationality	Time	Notes
1	Renate Meissner	East Germany	23.6	Q
2	Val Peat	Great Britain	23.8	Q
3	Gabrielle Meyer	France	23.8	Q
4	Mariana Goth	Romania	24.1	Q
5	Helen Golden	Great Britain	24.3	
6	Uschi Meyer	Switzerland	24.4	
7	Lyudmila Samotyosova	Soviet Union	24.5	
	Annette Berger	Luxembourg	DNF	

==== Semi-final 2 ====
Wind: -4.2 m/s

Rank	Name	Nationality	Time	Notes
1	Petra Vogt	East Germany	23.5	Q
2	Wilma van den Berg	Netherlands	23.7	Q
3	Else Hadrup	Denmark	24.2	Q
4	Madeleine Cobb	Great Britain	24.4	Q
5	Helga Kapfer	Austria	24.5	
6	Györgyi Balogh	Hungary	24.6	
	Godelieve Ducatteuw	Belgium	DNF	
	Nadezhda Besfamilnaya	Soviet Union	DNS	

=== Heats ===
18 September

==== Heat 1 ====
Wind: -0.2 m/s

Rank	Name	Nationality	Time	Notes
1	Renate Meissner	East Germany	23.3	Q
2	Else Hadrup	Denmark	24.2	Q
3	Mariana Goth	Romania	24.4	Q
4	Annette Berger	Luxembourg	26.3	Q

==== Heat 2 ====
Wind: -2 m/s

Rank	Name	Nationality	Time	Notes
1	Wilma van den Berg	Netherlands	23.7	Q
2	Lyudmila Samotyosova	Soviet Union	24.2	Q
3	Madeleine Cobb	Great Britain	24.5	Q
4	Helga Kapfer	Austria	24.5	Q
5	Ivanka Venkova	Bulgaria	25.1	
6	Kristín Jónsdóttir	Iceland	99.9	

==== Heat 3 ====
Wind: -2.4 m/s

Rank	Name	Nationality	Time	Notes
1	Nadezhda Besfamilnaya	Soviet Union	24.2	Q
2	Uschi Meyer	Switzerland	24.3	Q
3	Györgyi Balogh	Hungary	24.4	Q
4	Val Peat	Great Britain	24.9	Q

==== Heat 4 ====
Wind: -1.6 m/s

Rank	Name	Nationality	Time	Notes
1	Petra Vogt	East Germany	23.6	Q
2	Uschi Meyer	Switzerland	23.9	Q
3	Helen Golden	Great Britain	24.2	Q
4	Godelieve Ducatteuw	Belgium	25.0	Q
5	Lyudmila Golomazova	Soviet Union	25.1	
6	Suude Koçgil	Turkey	26.8	

== Participation ==
According to an unofficial count, 20 athletes from 15 countries participated in the event.

- Austria (1)
- Belgium (1)
- Bulgaria (1)
- Denmark (1)
- East Germany (2)
- France (1)
- Hungary (1)
- Iceland (1)
- Luxembourg (1)
- Netherlands (1)
- Romania (1)
- Soviet Union (3)
- Switzerland (1)
- Turkey (1)
- Great Britain (3)
