= 1974 European Athletics Championships – Women's 200 metres =

Women's 200 metres at the European Athletics Championships

The women's 200 metres at the 1974 European Athletics Championships was held in Rome, Italy, at Stadio Olimpico on 4 and 6 September 1974.

== Medalists ==
Gold	Irena Szewińska; Poland
Silver	Renate Stecher; East Germany
Bronze	Mona-Lisa Pursiainen; Finland

== Results ==
=== Final ===
6 September Wind: -2.8 m/s

Rank	Name	Nationality	Time	Notes
1st place, gold medalist(s)	Irena Szewińska	Poland	22.51	CR
2nd place, silver medalist(s)	Renate Stecher	East Germany	22.68	
3rd place, bronze medalist(s)	Mona-Lisa Pursiainen	Finland	23.17	
4	Lyudmila Maslakova	Soviet Union	23.31	
5	Helen Golden	Great Britain	23.38	
6	Annegret Kroniger	West Germany	23.38	
7	Christiane Krause	West Germany	23.78	
8	Petra Kandarr	East Germany	23.99	

=== Semi-finals ===
6 September

==== Semi-final 1 ====
Wind: -0.2 m/s

Rank	Name	Nationality	Time	Notes
1	Renate Stecher	East Germany	23.01	Q
2	Lyudmila Maslakova	Soviet Union	23.35	Q
3	Christiane Krause	West Germany	23.49	Q
4	Helen Golden	Great Britain	23.54	Q
5	Barbara Bakulin	Poland	23.81	
6	Wilma van den Berg	Netherlands	23.86	
7	Doris Maletzki	East Germany	24.07	
8	Elvira Possekel	West Germany	24.29	

==== Semi-final 2 ====
Wind: 0 m/s

Rank	Name	Nationality	Time	Notes
1	Irena Szewińska	Poland	22.88	Q
2	Mona-Lisa Pursiainen	Finland	23.17	Q
3	Annegret Kroniger	West Germany	23.29	Q
4	Petra Kandarr	East Germany	23.50	Q
5	Ildiko Szabó	Hungary	23.97	
6	Sharon Colyear	Great Britain	23.98	
7	Rosine Wallez	Belgium	24.03	
8	Marina Sidorova	Soviet Union	24.66	

=== Heats ===
4 September

==== Heat 1 ====
Wind: 1 m/s

Rank	Name	Nationality	Time	Notes
1	Mona-Lisa Pursiainen	Finland	23.13	Q
2	Petra Kandarr	East Germany	23.44	Q
3	Christiane Krause	West Germany	23.51	Q
4	Barbara Bakulin	Poland	23.56	q
5	Ildiko Szabó	Hungary	23.78	q
	Linda Haglund	Sweden	DNS	

==== Heat 2 ====
Wind: -1.2 m/s

Rank	Name	Nationality	Time	Notes
1	Renate Stecher	East Germany	23.35	Q
2	Marina Sidorova	Soviet Union	23.55	Q
3	Annegret Kroniger	West Germany	23.55	Q
4	Helen Golden	Great Britain	24.02	q
5	Laura Nappi	Italy	24.22	
	Jozefína Čerchlanová	Czechoslovakia	DNS	

==== Heat 3 ====
Wind: 0 m/s

Rank	Name	Nationality	Time	Notes
1	Lyudmila Maslakova	Soviet Union	23.45	Q
2	Irena Szewińska	Poland	23.87	Q
3	Elvira Possekel	West Germany	24.08	Q
4	Sharon Colyear	Great Britain	24.14	q
5	Sylviane Telliez	France	24.41	
	Alessandra Orselli	Italy	DNS	
	Jelica Pavličić	Yugoslavia	DNS	

==== Heat 4 ====
Wind: -1.5 m/s

Rank	Name	Nationality	Time	Notes
1	Doris Maletzki	East Germany	23.77	Q
2	Wilma van den Berg	Netherlands	23.84	Q
3	Rosine Wallez	Belgium	24.00	Q
4	Andrea Lynch	Great Britain	24.22	
5	Emma Sulter	France	33.92	
	Riitta Salin	Finland	DNS	
	Karoline Käfer	Austria	DNS	

== Participation ==
According to an unofficial count, 20 athletes from 11 countries participated in the event.

- Belgium (1)
- East Germany (3)
- Finland (1)
- France (2)
- Hungary (1)
- Italy (1)
- Netherlands (1)
- Poland (2)
- Soviet Union (2)
- Great Britain (3)
- West Germany (3)
