= 1974 European Athletics Indoor Championships – Women's 60 metres =

The women's 60 metres event at the 1974 European Athletics Indoor Championships was held on 10 March in Gothenburg.

== Medalists ==
Gold	Silver	Bronze
Renate Stecher; East Germany	Andrea Lynch; Great Britain	Irena Szewińska; Poland

== Results ==
=== Heats ===
First 4 from each heat (Q) qualified directly for the semifinals.

Rank	Heat	Name	Nationality	Time	Notes
1	2	Irena Szewińska	Poland	7.24	Q, =WB
2	1	Andrea Lynch	Great Britain	7.30	Q
2	2	Annegret Richter	West Germany	7.30	Q
4	2	Lyudmila Maslakova	Soviet Union	7.34	Q
4	3	Mona-Lisa Pursiainen	Finland	7.34	Q
6	4	Sylviane Telliez	France	7.37	Q
7	4	Renate Stecher	East Germany	7.37	Q
8	1	Nadezhda Besfamilnaya	Soviet Union	7.38	Q
9	3	Linda Haglund	Sweden	7.41	Q
10	2	Ellen Strophal	East Germany	7.45	Q
10	3	Christiane Krause	West Germany	7.45	Q
12	1	Nadine Goletto	France	7.46	Q
13	1	Renate Hoser	East Germany	7.49	Q
14	4	Elvira Possekel	West Germany	7.51	Q
15	4	Małgorzata Bogucka	Poland	7.57	Q
16	4	Carmen Ene	Romania	7.65	Q
17	3	Carmen Mähr	Austria	7.69	
18	4	Mieke van Wissen-Sterk	Netherlands	7.70	
19	2	Birthe Pedersen	Denmark	7.73	
20	1	Wilma Schurink	Netherlands	7.82	
21	1	Lea Alaerts	Belgium	7.85	

=== Semifinals ===
First 4 from each heat (Q) qualified directly for the final.

Rank	Heat	Name	Nationality	Time	Notes
1	1	Mona-Lisa Pursiainen	Finland	7.22	Q, =WB
2	2	Andrea Lynch	Great Britain	7.24	Q, NR
3	2	Sylviane Telliez	France	7.27	Q
4	2	Renate Stecher	East Germany	7.27	Q
5	1	Irena Szewińska	Poland	7.28	Q
6	2	Annegret Richter	West Germany	7.30	Q
7	1	Linda Haglund	Sweden	7.33	Q
7	2	Ellen Strophal	East Germany	7.33	
9	1	Lyudmila Maslakova	Soviet Union	7.34	Q
10	1	Christiane Krause	West Germany	7.39	
10	2	Nadezhda Besfamilnaya	Soviet Union	7.39	
12	1	Nadine Goletto	France	7.46	
13	1	Renate Hoser	East Germany	7.48	
14	2	Małgorzata Bogucka	Poland	7.49	
15	1	Elvira Possekel	West Germany	7.51	
16	2	Carmen Ene	Romania	7.61	NR

=== Final ===
Rank	Name	Nationality	Time	Notes
1st place, gold medalist(s)	Renate Stecher	East Germany	7.16	WB
2nd place, silver medalist(s)	Andrea Lynch	Great Britain	7.17	NR
3rd place, bronze medalist(s)	Irena Szewińska	Poland	7.20	NR
4	Mona-Lisa Pursiainen	Finland	7.24	
5	Lyudmila Maslakova	Soviet Union	7.35	
6	Linda Haglund	Sweden	7.35	
7	Annegret Richter	West Germany	7.35	
8	Sylviane Telliez	France	7.37	
