= 1966 European Athletics Championships – Women's 200 metres =

Women's 200 metres at the European Athletics Championships

The women's 200 metres at the 1966 European Athletics Championships was held in Budapest, Hungary, at Népstadion on 1 and 2 September 1966.

== Medalists ==
Gold	Irena Kirszenstein; Poland
Silver	Ewa Kłobukowska; Poland
Bronze	Vera Popkova; Soviet Union

== Results ==
=== Final ===
2 September Wind: 0.0 m/s

Rank	Name	Nationality	Time	Notes
1st place, gold medalist(s)	Irena Kirszenstein	Poland	23.1	CR
2nd place, silver medalist(s)	Ewa Kłobukowska	Poland	23.4	
3rd place, bronze medalist(s)	Vera Popkova	Soviet Union	23.7	
4	Kirsten Roggenkamp	West Germany	23.8	
5	Ingrid Tiedtke	East Germany	23.9	
6	Eva Lehocká	Czechoslovakia	24.0	
7	Hannelore Trabert	West Germany	24.2	
8	Truus Hennipman	Netherlands	24.3	

=== Semi-finals ===
1 September

==== Semi-final 1 ====
Wind: 0 m/s

Rank	Name	Nationality	Time	Notes
1	Ewa Kłobukowska	Poland	23.8	Q
2	Vera Popkova	Soviet Union	23.9	Q
3	Ingrid Tiedtke	East Germany	24.1	Q
4	Hannelore Trabert	West Germany	24.1	Q
5	Karin Wallgren	Sweden	24.4	
6	Ljiljana Petnjarić	Yugoslavia	25.0	
7	Gabrielle Meyer	France	25.2	
	Ioana Petrescu	Romania	DNF	

==== Semi-final 2 ====
Wind: 1.3 m/s

Rank	Name	Nationality	Time	Notes
1	Irena Kirszenstein	Poland	23.6	Q
2	Kirsten Roggenkamp	West Germany	23.8	Q
3	Truus Hennipman	Netherlands	24.0	Q
4	Eva Lehocká	Czechoslovakia	24.1	Q
5	Valentyna Bolshova	Soviet Union	24.3	
6	Maureen Tranter	Great Britain	24.3	
7	Christina Heinich	East Germany	24.5	
8	Donata Govoni	Italy	24.9	

=== Heats ===
1 September

==== Heat 1 ====
Wind: 3.3 m/s

Rank	Name	Nationality	Time	Notes
1	Truus Hennipman	Netherlands	24.0 w	Q
2	Ioana Petrescu	Romania	24.5 w	Q
3	Maureen Tranter	Great Britain	24.7 w	Q
4	Gabrielle Meyer	France	25.6 w	Q

==== Heat 2 ====
Wind: 0.3 m/s

Rank	Name	Nationality	Time	Notes
1	Ewa Kłobukowska	Poland	24.3	Q
2	Christina Heinich	East Germany	24.3	Q
3	Karin Wallgren	Sweden	24.4	Q
4	Valentyna Bolshova	Soviet Union	24.4	Q
5	Olimbi Moçka	Albania	27.2	

==== Heat 3 ====
Wind: 2.9 m/s

Rank	Name	Nationality	Time	Notes
1	Vera Popkova	Soviet Union	23.7 w	Q
2	Kirsten Roggenkamp	West Germany	23.7 w	Q
3	Ingrid Tiedtke	East Germany	23.9 w	Q
4	Eva Lehocká	Czechoslovakia	24.3 w	Q
5	Janet Simpson	Great Britain	24.6 w	
6	Erzsébet Bartos	Hungary	24.8 w	

==== Heat 4 ====
Wind: 5.2 m/s

Rank	Name	Nationality	Time	Notes
1	Hannelore Trabert	West Germany	24.6 w	Q
2	Donata Govoni	Italy	24.7 w	Q
3	Ljiljana Petnjarić	Yugoslavia	25.2 w	Q
4	Irena Kirszenstein	Poland	25.2 w	Q

== Participation ==
According to an unofficial count, 19 athletes from 14 countries participated in the event.

- Albania (1)
- Czechoslovakia (1)
- East Germany (2)
- France (1)
- Hungary (1)
- Italy (1)
- Netherlands (1)
- Poland (2)
- Romania (1)
- Soviet Union (2)
- Sweden (1)
- Great Britain (2)
- West Germany (2)
- Yugoslavia (1)
