= Athletics at the 1965 Summer Universiade – Women's 200 metres =

The women's 200 metres event at the 1965 Summer Universiade was held at the People's Stadium in Budapest on 27 and 28 August 1965.

== Medalists ==
Gold	Silver	Bronze
Irena Kirszenstein; Poland	Miguelina Cobián; Cuba	Liz Gill; Great Britain

== Results ==
=== Semifinals ===
Rank	Heat	Athlete	Nationality	Time	Notes
1	1	Miguelina Cobián	Cuba	23.9	Q
2	1	Vera Popkova	Soviet Union	24.0	Q
3	1	Beryl Weir	Great Britain	24.5	Q
4	1	Gerlinde Beyrichen	West Germany	25.1	Q
5	1	Louise Fricq	Belgium	26.1	
1	2	Irena Kirszenstein	Poland	24.0	Q
2	2	Liz Gill	Great Britain	24.1	Q
3	2	Lyudmila Samotyosova	Soviet Union	24.4	Q
4	2	Ida Such	Hungary	24.7	Q
5	2	Helga Kapfer	Austria	25.5	
6	2	Gabriele Grossekettler	West Germany	25.7	

=== Final ===
Wind: +1.3 m/s

Rank	Name	Nationality	Time	Notes
1st place, gold medalist(s)	Irena Kirszenstein	Poland	23.5	
2nd place, silver medalist(s)	Miguelina Cobián	Cuba	23.9	
3rd place, bronze medalist(s)	Liz Gill	Great Britain	24.0	
4	Vera Popkova	Soviet Union	24.1	
5	Lyudmila Samotyosova	Soviet Union	24.2	
6	Beryl Weir	Great Britain	24.7	
7	Ida Such	Hungary	25.1	
8	Gerlinde Beyrichen	West Germany	25.4	
