= Athletics at the 1965 Summer Universiade – Women's 100 metres =

The women's 100 metres event at the 1965 Summer Universiade was held at the People's Stadium in Budapest on 25 and 26 August 1965.

== Medalists ==
Gold	Silver	Bronze
Irena Kirszenstein; Poland	Miguelina Cobián; Cuba	Liz Gill; Great Britain

== Results ==
=== Heats ===
Held on 25 August

Rank	Heat	Athlete	Nationality	Time	Notes
1	1	Irena Kirszenstein	Poland	11.3	Q
2	1	Ritsuko Sukegawa	Japan	11.8	Q
3	1	Ida Such	Hungary	11.8	Q
4	1	Manuela Kaufhold	Luxembourg	12.4	Q
1	2	Miguelina Cobián	Cuba	11.4	Q
2	2	Renāte Lāce	Soviet Union	11.7	Q
3	2	Gerlinde Beyrichen	West Germany	11.7	Q
4	2	Danuta Straszyńska	Poland	12.0	Q
5	2	Lorna McGarvey	Great Britain	12.1	
6	2	Louise Fricq	Belgium	12.6	
1	3	Liz Gill	Great Britain	11.6	Q
2	3	Lyudmila Samotyosova	Soviet Union	11.6	Q
3	3	Marlies Fünfstück	West Germany	12.0	Q
4	3	Helga Kapfer	Austria	12.2	Q
5	3	Gabrielle Meyer	France	12.5	
5	3	Teréz Bata	Hungary	13.1	

=== Semifinals ===
Held on 26 August

Wind:
Heat 1: +4.8 m/s, Heat 2: ? m/s

Rank	Heat	Athlete	Nationality	Time	Notes
1	1	Irena Kirszenstein	Poland	11.3	Q
2	1	Liz Gill	Great Britain	11.5	Q
3	1	Renāte Lāce	Soviet Union	11.7	Q
4	1	Ida Such	Hungary	12.0	Q
5	1	Marlies Fünfstück	West Germany	12.1	
6	1	Helga Kapfer	Austria	12.6	
1	2	Miguelina Cobián	Cuba	11.4	Q
2	2	Lyudmila Samotyosova	Soviet Union	11.7	Q
3	2	Gerlinde Beyrichen	West Germany	11.8	Q
4	2	Ritsuko Sukegawa	Japan	11.8	Q
5	2	Manuela Kaufhold	Luxembourg	12.6	
	2	Danuta Straszyńska	Poland	?	

=== Final ===
Held on 26 August

Wind: +2.6 m/s

Rank	Name	Nationality	Time	Notes
1st place, gold medalist(s)	Irena Kirszenstein	Poland	11.3	
2nd place, silver medalist(s)	Miguelina Cobián	Cuba	11.5	
3rd place, bronze medalist(s)	Liz Gill	Great Britain	11.6	
4	Renāte Lāce	Soviet Union	11.7	
5	Lyudmila Samotyosova	Soviet Union	11.7	
6	Gerlinde Beyrichen	West Germany	11.7	
7	Ritsuko Sukegawa	Japan	11.8	
8	Ida Such	Hungary	11.9	
