= 1969 European Indoor Games – Women's 50 metres =

The women's 50 metres event at the 1969 European Indoor Games was held on 9 March in Belgrade.

== Medalists ==
Gold	Silver	Bronze
Irena Szewińska; Poland	Sylviane Telliez; France	Madeleine Cobb; Great Britain

== Results ==
=== Heats ===
First 2 from each heat (Q) and the next 1 fastest (q) qualified for the final.

Rank	Heat	Name	Nationality	Time	Notes
1	1	Irena Szewińska	Poland	6.5	Q
2	1	Madeleine Cobb	Great Britain	6.5	Q
3	1	Galina Kuznetsova	Soviet Union	6.6	q
4	1	Marijana Lubej	Yugoslavia	6.7	
5	1	Johanna Kleinpeter	Austria	6.8	
1	2	Karin Balzer	East Germany	6.6	Q
2	2	Eva Putnová	Czechoslovakia	6.6	Q
3	2	Galina Bukharina	Soviet Union	6.7	
4	2	Aurelia Petrescu	Romania	6.7	
5	2	Inge Aigner	Austria	7.0	
1	3	Sylviane Telliez	France	6.5	Q
2	3	Urszula Jóźwik	Poland	6.6	Q
3	3	Györgyi Balogh	Hungary	6.6	
4	3	Ljiljana Petnjarić	Yugoslavia	6.7	
5	3	Snezhana Yurukova	Bulgaria	6.7	

=== Final ===
Rank	Name	Nationality	Time	Notes
1st place, gold medalist(s)	Irena Szewińska	Poland	6.4	
2nd place, silver medalist(s)	Sylviane Telliez	France	6.5	
3rd place, bronze medalist(s)	Madeleine Cobb	Great Britain	6.5	
4	Galyna Kuznetsova	Soviet Union	6.5	
5	Urszula Jóźwik	Poland	6.5	
6	Karin Balzer	East Germany	6.6	
7	Eva Putnová	Czechoslovakia	6.6	
