= 1967 European Indoor Games – Women's 50 metres =

The women's 50 metres event at the 1967 European Indoor Games was held on 11 and 12 March in Prague.

== Medalists ==
Gold	Silver	Bronze
Margit Nemesházi; Hungary	Karin Wallgren; Sweden	Galina Bukharina; Soviet Union

== Results ==
=== Heats ===
First 3 from each heat (Q) qualified directly for the final.

Rank	Heat	Name	Nationality	Time	Notes
1	1	Karin Wallgren	Sweden	6.2	Q, WB
2	1	Vera Popkova	Soviet Union	6.3	Q
3	1	Hannelore Trabert	West Germany	6.3	Q
4	1	Brigitte Geyer	East Germany	6.4	
5	1	Eva Putnová	Czechoslovakia	6.4	
6	1	Berit Berthelsen	Norway	6.4	
1	2	Alena Kalodová	Czechoslovakia	6.4	Q
2	2	Galina Bukharina	Soviet Union	6.4	Q
3	2	Margit Nemesházi	Hungary	6.4	Q
4	2	Jutta Stöck	West Germany	6.5	
5	2	Ljiljana Petnjarić	Yugoslavia	6.6	

=== Final ===
Rank	Name	Nationality	Time	Notes
1st place, gold medalist(s)	Margit Nemesházi	Hungary	6.3	
2nd place, silver medalist(s)	Karin Wallgren	Sweden	6.4	
3rd place, bronze medalist(s)	Galina Bukharina	Soviet Union	6.5	
4	Hannelore Trabert	West Germany	6.5	
5	Alena Kalodová	Czechoslovakia	6.6	
6	Vera Popkova	Soviet Union	6.6	
