= 1969 European Indoor Games – Women's medley relay =

The women's 195 + 390 + 585 + 780 metres medley relay event at the 1969 European Indoor Games was held on 8 March in Belgrade. The first athlete ran one lap of the 195-metre track, the second two, the third three and the anchor four, thus 10 laps or 1950 metres in total.

== Results ==
Rank	Nation	Competitors	Time	Notes
1st place, gold medalist(s)	Soviet Union	Vera Popkova; Lyudmila Samotyosova; Raisa Nikonorova; Anna Zimina	4:52.4	
2nd place, silver medalist(s)	Poland	Irena Szewińska; Zdzisława Robaszewska; Elżbieta Skowrońska; Zofia Kołakowska	4:53.2	
3rd place, bronze medalist(s)	Yugoslavia	Verica Ambrozi; Ika Maričić; Mirjana Kovačev; Ninoslava Tikvicki	5:05.9	
	Hungary	Györgyi Balogh; Antónia Munkácsi; Magdolna Kulcsár; Olga Kazi	DNF	
