= 1971 European Athletics Indoor Championships – Women's 60 metres =

The women's 60 metres event at the 1971 European Athletics Indoor Championships was held on 14 March in Sofia.

== Medalists ==
Gold	Silver	Bronze
Renate Stecher; East Germany	Sylviane Telliez; France	Annegret Irrgang; West Germany

== Results ==
=== Heats ===
First 3 from each heat (Q) qualified directly for the semifinals.

Rank	Heat	Name	Nationality	Time	Notes
1	1	Györgyi Balogh	Hungary	7.5	Q
2	1	Michèle Beugnet	France	7.6	Q
3	1	Eva Putnová	Czechoslovakia	7.7	Q
4	1	Ivanka Valkova	Bulgaria	7.7	
5	1	Francine van Assche	Belgium	7.8	
6	1	Anneli Olsson	Sweden	7.8	
1	2	Renate Stecher	East Germany	7.4	Q
2	2	Sylviane Telliez	France	7.5	Q
3	2	Heide Rosendahl	West Germany	7.5	Q
4	2	Cecilia Molinari	Italy	7.6	
5	2	Trudy Ruth	Netherlands	7.6	
6	2	Branislava Gak	Yugoslavia	7.8	
1	3	Irena Szewińska	Poland	7.6	Q
2	3	Annelie Wilden	West Germany	7.6	Q
3	3	Wilma van den Berg	Netherlands	7.7	Q
4	3	Yordanka Yankova	Bulgaria	7.7	
5	3	Christine Kepplinger	Austria	7.8	
6	3	Aurelia Mărăşescu	Romania	7.9	
1	4	Annegret Irrgang	West Germany	7.4	Q
2	4	Margit Nemesházi	Hungary	7.6	Q
3	4	Olga Chernova	Soviet Union	7.7	Q
4	4	Mieke Sterk	Netherlands	7.7	
5	4	Joanna Sikorska	Poland	7.8	
6	4	Carmen Mähr	Austria	7.8	

=== Semifinals ===
First 3 from each heat (Q) qualified directly for the final.

Rank	Heat	Name	Nationality	Time	Notes
1	1	Annegret Irrgang	West Germany	7.4	Q
2	1	Sylviane Telliez	France	7.4	Q
3	1	Györgyi Balogh	Hungary	7.5	Q
4	1	Michèle Beugnet	France	7.6	
5	1	Wilma van den Berg	Netherlands	7.7	
6	1	Eva Putnová	Czechoslovakia	7.7	
1	2	Renate Stecher	East Germany	7.4	Q
2	2	Irena Szewińska	Poland	7.5	Q
3	2	Heide Rosendahl	West Germany	7.5	Q
4	2	Annelie Wilden	West Germany	7.5	
5	2	Margit Nemesházi	Hungary	7.6	
6	2	Olga Chernova	Soviet Union	7.7	

=== Final ===
Rank	Lane	Name	Nationality	Time	Notes
1st place, gold medalist(s)	5	Renate Stecher	East Germany	7.3	
2nd place, silver medalist(s)	6	Sylviane Telliez	France	7.4	
3rd place, bronze medalist(s)	3	Annegret Irrgang	West Germany	7.4	
4	4	Irena Szewińska	Poland	7.5	
5	1	Heide Rosendahl	West Germany	7.5	
6	2	Györgyi Balogh	Hungary	7.5	
