= 1975 European Athletics Indoor Championships – Women's 60 metres =

The women's 60 metres event at the 1975 European Athletics Indoor Championships was held on 9 March in Katowice.

== Medalists ==
Gold	Silver	Bronze
Andrea Lynch; Great Britain	Monika Meyer; East Germany	Irena Szewińska; Poland

== Results ==
=== Heats ===
First 2 from each heat (Q) and the next 4 fastest (q) qualified for the semifinals.

Rank	Heat	Name	Nationality	Time	Notes
1	2	Irena Szewińska	Poland	7.33	Q
2	3	Andrea Lynch	Great Britain	7.34	Q
3	4	Elvira Possekel	West Germany	7.38	Q
4	1	Monika Meyer	East Germany	7.39	Q
5	4	Lea Alaerts	Belgium	7.40	Q
6	4	Lyudmila Maslakova	Soviet Union	7.41	q
7	3	Helena Fliśnik	Poland	7.44	Q
8	2	Lidiya Alfeyeva	Soviet Union	7.45	Q
9	3	Tuula Rautanen	Finland	7.46	q
9	4	Brigitte Haest	Austria	7.46	q
11	1	Tatyana Vorokhobko	Soviet Union	7.47	Q
12	1	Rita Bottiglieri	Italy	7.51	q
13	4	Annie Alizé	France	7.51	
14	2	Maren Gang-Schröder	West Germany	7.53	
15	1	Nadine Goletto	France	7.55	
16	2	Cecilia Molinari	Italy	7.58	
16	1	Maria Żukowska	Poland	7.60	
18	3	Krista Jarošová	Czechoslovakia	7.63	
19	3	Maroula Lambrou	Greece	7.76	
20	1	Begona Lezano	Spain	7.89	

=== Semifinals ===
First 2 from each heat (Q) and the next 2 fastest (q) qualified for the final.

Rank	Heat	Name	Nationality	Time	Notes
1	1	Andrea Lynch	Great Britain	7.20	Q
2	2	Irena Szewińska	Poland	7.28	Q
3	2	Monika Meyer	East Germany	7.31	Q
4	1	Tatyana Vorokhobko	Soviet Union	7.35	Q
5	1	Elvira Possekel	West Germany	7.37	q
6	2	Rita Bottiglieri	Italy	7.42	q
7	1	Lyudmila Maslakova	Soviet Union	7.42	
8	2	Lidiya Alfeyeva	Soviet Union	7.45	
9	2	Brigitte Haest	Austria	7.47	
10	1	Helena Fliśnik	Poland	7.49	
10	2	Lea Alaerts	Belgium	7.49	
12	1	Tuula Rautanen	Finland	7.51	

=== Final ===
Rank	Name	Nationality	Time	Notes
1st place, gold medalist(s)	Andrea Lynch	Great Britain	7.17	
2nd place, silver medalist(s)	Monika Meyer	East Germany	7.24	
3rd place, bronze medalist(s)	Irena Szewińska	Poland	7.26	
4	Elvira Possekel	West Germany	7.38	
5	Rita Bottiglieri	Italy	7.43	
	Tatyana Vorokhobko	Soviet Union	DNS	
