= Andrea Lynch =

British sprinter (born 1952)

Personal information
- Nationality: British (English)/Barbadian
- Born: 24 November 1952 (age 73) Barbados
- Height: 157 cm (5 ft 2 in)
- Weight: 52 kg (115 lb)

Sport
- Sport: Athletics
- Event: Sprints
- Club: Mitcham AC
Medal record
Women's athletics
Representing Great Britain
European Championships
Bronze medal – third place	1974 Rome	100 m
European Indoor Championships
Gold medal – first place	1975 Katowice	60 m
Silver medal – second place	1974 Gothenburg	60 m
Representing England
British Commonwealth Games
Silver medal – second place	1974 Christchurch	100 m
Silver medal – second place	1974 Christchurch	4×100 m
Representing Europe
World Cup
Gold medal – first place	1977 Düsseldorf	4×100 m

Andrea Joan Caron Lynch (born 24 November 1952) is a British former track and field sprinter who competed mainly in the 100 metres. A two-time Olympian, the peak of her career was becoming a bronze medallist in the 100 m at the 1974 European Championships and a double silver medallist in the 100 m and 4 × 100 metres relay at the 1974 British Commonwealth Games. A former British record holder in the 100 m, she has a hand-timed best of 10.9 seconds in 1974 and an auto-timed best of 11.16 secs in 1975. Her 200 metres best is 23.15 secs in 1975.

== Biography ==
Born in Barbados, she moved to England with her family at a young age. She would later apply to represent the country of her birth for the 1970 British Commonwealth Games, but decided to compete for Britain after she failed to receive a response. She proved herself as a young sprinter for Britain, winning at the English Schools' Athletics Championships over 100 m in 1970 and over 200 metres in 1971. She was the 100 m winner at the 1970 British Schools International Match. Her first major medal came at the 1970 European Athletics Junior Championships, being 100 m silver medallist behind Poland's Helena Kerner.

In 1974 she equalled the world record for the 60 metres, running 7.2 seconds. She had some of her greatest successes in that indoor event, winning the gold medal at the 1975 European Athletics Indoor Championships, having previously won a silver at the competition in 1974.

Lynch represented Great Britain at the Olympics in 1972 and 1976. In her first appearance, while still a teenager, she was a semi-finalist in the 100 m and was seventh in the 4 × 100 metres relay. Returning four years later, she made the Olympic 100 metres final and placed seventh, as well as making the relay final.

The following year she was runner-up to Renate Stecher at the 1975 European Cup and took her last major individual medals at the 1977 Universiade (a 100 m silver and 200 m bronze). Her only global level medal came with the European relay team at the 1977 IAAF World Cup, where she teamed up with national rival Sonia Lannaman and West Germany's Annegret Richter and Elvira Possekel to claim the gold.

At national level she won three British 100 metres titles (1973, 1975 and 1976) at the WAAA Championships, and was classed as a four time British champion because she finished as the best placed British athlete the 1974 WAAA Championships. She also wond three 60 m titles at the AAA Indoor Championships (1973, 1975 and 1976). She was runner-up in both 100 m and 200 m to Sonia Lannaman at the inaugural 1977 UK Athletics Championships. She also competed as a guest at the Scottish Athletics Championships in 1972 and won both short sprints.

Lynch was also a competitive AIAW sprinter for the Long Beach State Beach track and field team in the United States, finishing 2nd in the 100 m at the 1977 AIAW Outdoor Track and Field Championships.

After retiring from competitive athletics, she remained involved with the sport and took up sprint coaching, including top ranked national junior sprinter Kyle Reynolds-Warmington at Belgrave Harriers.

She was formerly married to Canadian Olympic sprinter Brian Saunders.

== International competitions ==
Year	Competition	Venue	Position	Event	Notes
1970	European Junior Championships	Colombes, France	2nd	100 m	12.19
1970	European Junior Championships	Colombes, France	11th (sf)	200 m	24.7
1970	European Junior Championships	Colombes, France	5th	4 × 100 m relay	46.30
1972	Olympic Games	Munich, Germany	15th (sf)	100 m	11.64
1972	Olympic Games	Munich, Germany	7th	4 × 100 m relay	43.71
1974	British Commonwealth Games	Christchurch, New Zealand	2nd	100 m	11.31
1974	British Commonwealth Games	Christchurch, New Zealand	2nd	4 × 100 m relay	44.30
1974	European Indoor Championships	Gothenburg, Sweden	2nd	60 m	7.17
1974	European Championships	Rome, Italy	3rd	100 m	11.28
1974	European Championships	Rome, Italy	17th (h)	200 m	24.22
1974	European Championships	Rome, Italy	4th	4 × 100 m relay	43.94
1975	European Indoor Championships	Katowice, Poland	1st	60 m	7.17
1975	European Cup	Nice, France	2nd	100 m	11.37
1976	Olympic Games	Montreal, Quebec, Canada	7th	100 m	11.32
1976	Olympic Games	Montreal, Quebec, Canada	8th	4 × 100 m relay	43.79
1977	Universiade	Sofia, Bulgaria	2nd	100 m	11.22
1977	Universiade	Sofia, Bulgaria	3rd	200 m	23.23
1977	IAAF World Cup	Düsseldorf, West Germany	1st	4 × 100 m relay	42.51
(#) indicates overall position in qualifying heats (h) or semifinals (sf)

== National titles ==
- AAA Championships
  - 100 metres: 1973, 1975, 1976
- AAA Indoor Championships
  - 60 metres: 1973, 1975, 1976
- Scottish Athletics Championships
  - 100 metres: 1972
  - 200 metres: 1972

== See also ==
- List of European Athletics Championships medalists (women)
- List of European Athletics Indoor Championships medalists (women)
- List of 100 metres national champions (women)
