= 1968 European Indoor Games – Women's 4 × 182 metres relay =

The women's 4 × 182 metres relay event at the 1968 European Indoor Games was held on 10 March in Madrid. Each athlete ran one lap of the 182 metres track.

== Results ==
Rank	Nation	Competitors	Time	Notes
1st place, gold medalist(s)	West Germany	Renate Meyer; Hannelore Trabert; Christa Elsler; Erika Rost	1:28.8	
	Soviet Union	Liliya Tkachenko; Lyudmila Samotyosova; Vera Popkova; Natalya Chistyakova	DQ	
