= Athletics at the 1967 Summer Universiade – Women's 100 metres =

The women's 100 metres event at the 1967 Summer Universiade was held at the National Olympic Stadium in Tokyo on 30 and 31 August 1967.

== Medalists ==
Gold	Silver	Bronze
Barbara Ferrell; United States	Gabrielle Meyer; France	Gerlind Beyrichen; West Germany

== Results ==
=== Heats ===
Rank	Heat	Athlete	Nationality	Time	Notes
1	1	Barbara Ferrell	United States	11.5	Q
2	1	Gerlinde Beyrichen	West Germany	11.9	Q
3	1	Miho Sato	Japan	11.9	Q
4	1	Jannette Champion	Great Britain	12.0	Q
5	1	Helga Kapfer	Austria	12.2	
6	1	Glória Ferraz	Brazil	12.4	
7	1	Hwang Jung-ja	South Korea	12.8	
1	2	Gabrielle Meyer	France	11.8	Q
2	2	Ritsuko Sukegawa	Japan	12.2	Q
3	2	Angela Birch	Great Britain	12.4	Q
4	2	Marlies Fünfstück	West Germany	12.4	Q
5	2	Biruta Vilmanis	Australia	12.8	
6	2	Johanna Kleinpeter	Austria	12.8	

=== Final ===
Wind: -0.3 m/s

Rank	Name	Nationality	Time	Notes
1st place, gold medalist(s)	Barbara Ferrell	United States	11.6	
2nd place, silver medalist(s)	Gabrielle Meyer	France	11.7	
3rd place, bronze medalist(s)	Gerlinde Beyrichen	West Germany	12.1	
4	Jannette Champion	Great Britain	12.1	
5	Miho Sato	Japan	12.2	
6	Ritsuko Sukegawa	Japan	12.2	
7	Angela Birch	Great Britain	12.4	
8	Marlies Fünfstück	West Germany	12.4	
