= Kenneth Lundmark =

Swedish high jumper

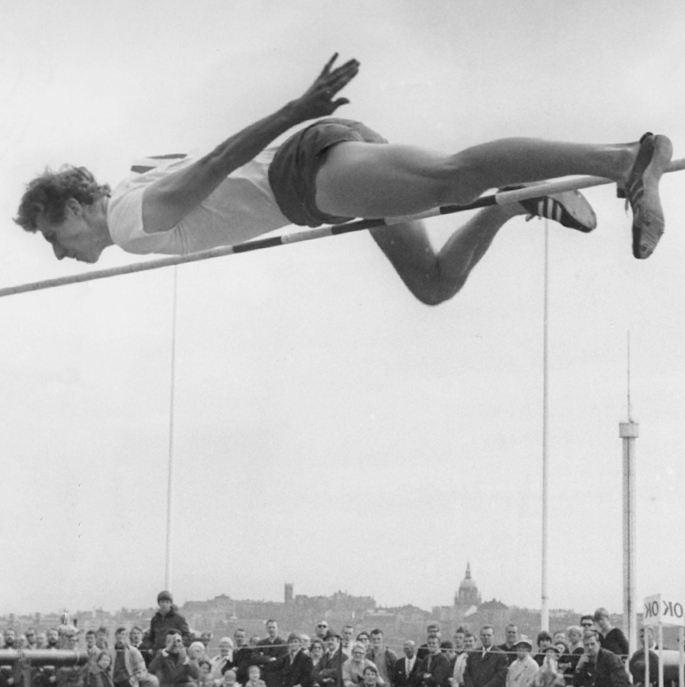

Personal information
- Nationality: Swedish
- Born: 25 March 1946 (age 80) Skellefteå, Sweden
- Height: 201 cm (6 ft 7 in)
- Weight: 89 kg (196 lb)

Sport
- Sport: Athletics
- Event: High jump
- Club: Skellefteå AIK

Achievements and titles
- Olympic finals: 1968 Men's High Jump results
- Personal best: 2.18 (1969)
Medal record
Representing Sweden
European Indoor Games
Bronze medal – third place	1968 Madrid	High jump
European Cup
Gold medal – first place	1970 Stockholm	High jump

Bengt Kenneth Lundmark (born 25 March 1946) is a retired Swedish high jumper who competed at the 1968 Summer Olympics.

== Biography ==
Lundmark won a bronze medal at the 1968 European Indoor Games and a gold medal at the 1970 European Cup, and he competed at the Lundmark was the Swedish champion in 1968 and 1970 and shared a national record with Bo Jonsson in 1969.

He won the British AAA Championships title in the high jump event at the 1969 AAA Championships.

Lundmark is a member of the Church of Jesus Christ of Latter-day Saints
