= 1969 European Indoor Games – Women's long jump =

The women's long jump event at the 1969 European Indoor Games was held on 8 March in Belgrade.

== Results ==
Rank	Name	Nationality	Result	Notes
1st place, gold medalist(s)	Irena Szewińska	Poland	6.38	
2nd place, silver medalist(s)	Sue Scott	Great Britain	6.18	
3rd place, bronze medalist(s)	Meta Antenen	Switzerland	6.15	
4	Heidemarie Rosendahl	West Germany	6.10	
5	Odette Ducas	France	6.07	
6	Mirosława Sarna	Poland	6.02	
7	Hanna Kleinpeter	Austria	5.97	
8	Tatyana Bychkova	Soviet Union	5.93	
9	Đurđa Fočić	Yugoslavia	5.75	
10	Alina Popescu	Romania	5.74	
11	Nedyalka Angelova	Bulgaria	5.64	
