= 1970 European Athletics Indoor Championships – Women's 4 × 200 metres relay =

The women's 4 × 200 metres relay event at the 1970 European Athletics Indoor Championships was held on 14 March in Vienna. Each athlete ran one lap of the 200 metres track.

== Results ==
Rank	Nation	Competitors	Time	Notes
1st place, gold medalist(s)	Soviet Union	Nadezhda Besfamilnaya; Vera Popkova; Galina Bukharina; Lyudmila Samotyosova	1:35.7	
2nd place, silver medalist(s)	West Germany	Elfgard Schittenhelm; Annelie Wilden; Marianne Bolling; Annegret Kroniger	1:37.6	
3rd place, bronze medalist(s)	Austria	Maria Sykora; Brigitte Ortner; Christa Kepplinger; Hanni Burger	1:40.8	
