= 1971 European Athletics Indoor Championships – Women's long jump =

The women's long jump event at the 1971 European Athletics Indoor Championships was held on 13 March in Sofia.

== Results ==
Rank	Name	Nationality	#1	#2	#3	#4	#5	#6	Result	Notes
1st place, gold medalist(s)	Heide Rosendahl	West Germany	6.41	x	6.18	6.64	x	x	6.64	
2nd place, silver medalist(s)	Irena Szewińska	Poland	6.18	x	6.36	6.56	x	6.47	6.56	
3rd place, bronze medalist(s)	Viorica Viscopoleanu	Romania	x	x	6.45	6.47	6.53	x	6.53	
4	Meta Antenen	Switzerland	6.04	6.25	x	x	x	6.33	6.33	
5	Alla Smirnova	Soviet Union	6.30	x	6.09	5.98	x	x	6.30	
6	Heidi Schüller	West Germany	6.25	x	6.14	x	5.91	5.88	6.25	
7	Brigitte Roesen	West Germany							6.20	
8	Helēna Ringa	Soviet Union							5.98	
9	Jarmila Nygrýnová	Czechoslovakia							5.96	
10	Nedyalka Angelova	Bulgaria							5.94	
