= Monika Hamann =

German sprinter

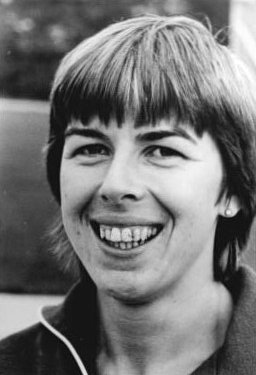
- Hamann in 1978

Medal record

Women's athletics

Representing East Germany

European Championships
Bronze medal – third place	1978 Prague	4×100 m

European Indoor Championships
Silver medal – second place	1975 Katowice	60 m

Monika Hamann (née Meyer; born 8 June 1954 in Waren) is a retired East German sprinter who specialized in the 100 and 200 m. She represented the sports team SC Neubrandenburg.

== Biography ==
Meyer competed at the 1971 European Championships, without reaching the final, and won the silver medal in 60 m at the 1975 European Indoor Championships. At the 1978 European Championships she finished fourth in the 100 m and 200 m and won a bronze medal in the 4 × 100 m relay together with Johanna Klier, Carla Bodendorf und Marlies Göhr.

Her personal best time was 11.03 seconds, achieved in July 1977 in Dresden. This result ranks her ninth among German 100 m sprinters, behind Marlies Göhr, Marita Koch, Silke Gladisch, Katrin Krabbe, Heike Drechsler, Bärbel Wöckel, Annegret Richter and Romy Müller.

== See also ==
- Media related to Monika Hamann at Wikimedia Commons
- German all-time top lists - 100 metres
