= Irena Szewińska =

Polish sprinter (1946–2018)

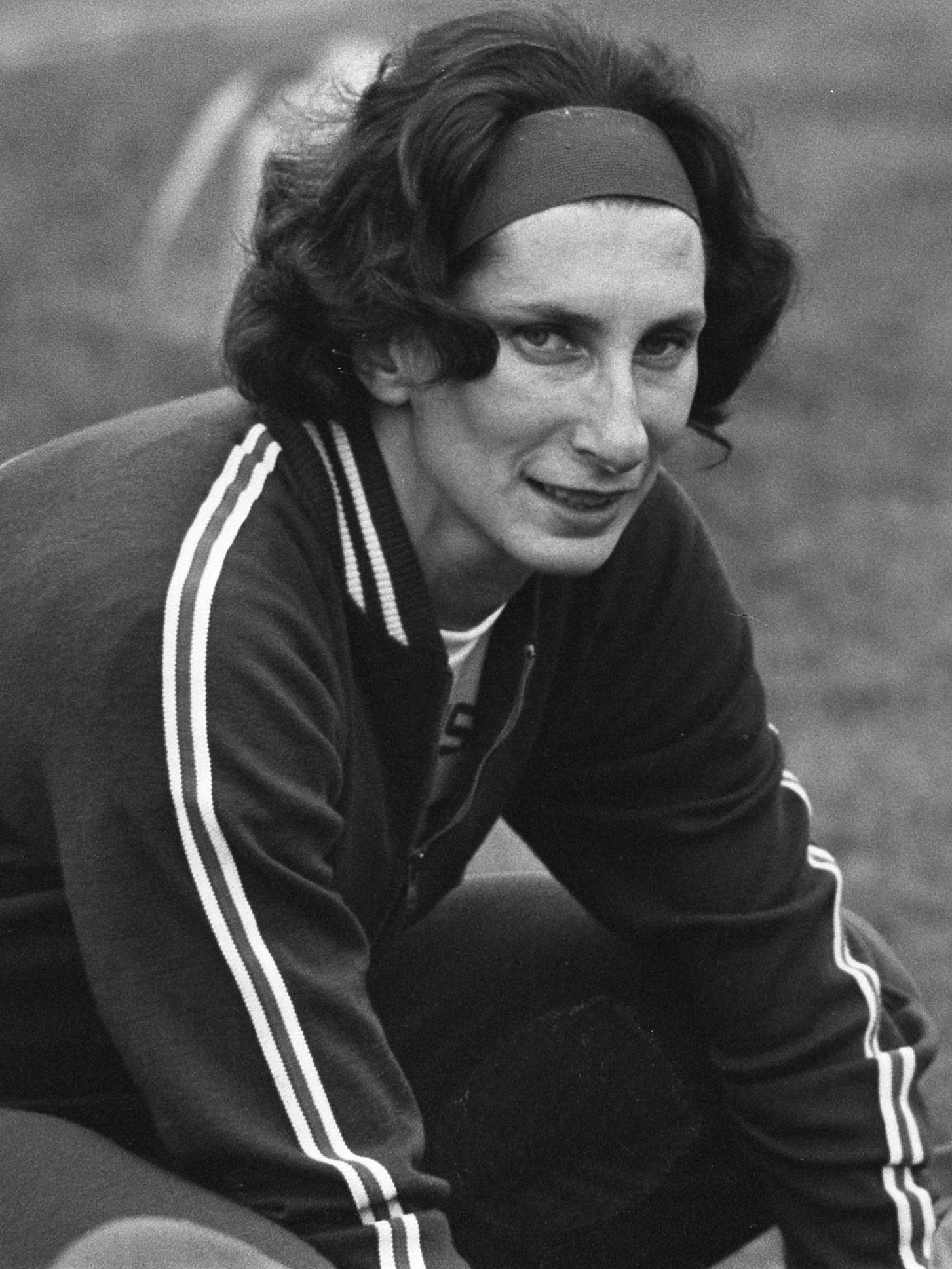
- Szewińska in 1975

Personal information
- Born: 24 May 1946 Leningrad, Russian SFSR, Soviet Union
- Died: 29 June 2018 (aged 72) Warsaw, Poland
- Height: 1.76 m (5 ft 9 in)
- Weight: 60 kg (132 lb)

Sport
- Sport: Athletics
- Club: Polonia Warszawa
Medal record
Women's athletics
Representing Poland
Event	1st	2nd	3rd
Olympic Games	3	2	2
European Championships	5	1	4
European Indoor Championships	2	2	2
Summer Universiade	2	1	0
Total	12	6	8
Olympic Games
Gold medal – first place	1964 Tokyo	4 × 100 m
Gold medal – first place	1968 Mexico City	200 m
Gold medal – first place	1976 Montréal	400 m
Silver medal – second place	1964 Tokyo	200 m
Silver medal – second place	1964 Tokyo	Long jump
Bronze medal – third place	1968 Mexico City	100 m
Bronze medal – third place	1972 Munich	200 m
European Championships
Gold medal – first place	1966 Budapest	200 m
Gold medal – first place	1966 Budapest	Long jump
Gold medal – first place	1966 Budapest	4 × 100 m
Gold medal – first place	1974 Rome	100 m
Gold medal – first place	1974 Rome	200 m
Silver medal – second place	1966 Budapest	100 m
Bronze medal – third place	1971 Helsinki	200 m
Bronze medal – third place	1974 Rome	4 × 100 m
Bronze medal – third place	1978 Prague	400 m
Bronze medal – third place	1978 Prague	4 × 400 m
European Indoor Championships
Gold medal – first place	1969 Belgrade	50 m
Gold medal – first place	1969 Belgrade	Long jump
Silver medal – second place	1969 Belgrade	medley relay
Silver medal – second place	1971 Sofia	Long jump
Bronze medal – third place	1974 Gothenburg	60 m
Bronze medal – third place	1975 Katowice	60 m
Universiade
Gold medal – first place	1965 Budapest	100 m
Gold medal – first place	1965 Budapest	200 m
Silver medal – second place	1965 Budapest	4 × 100 m

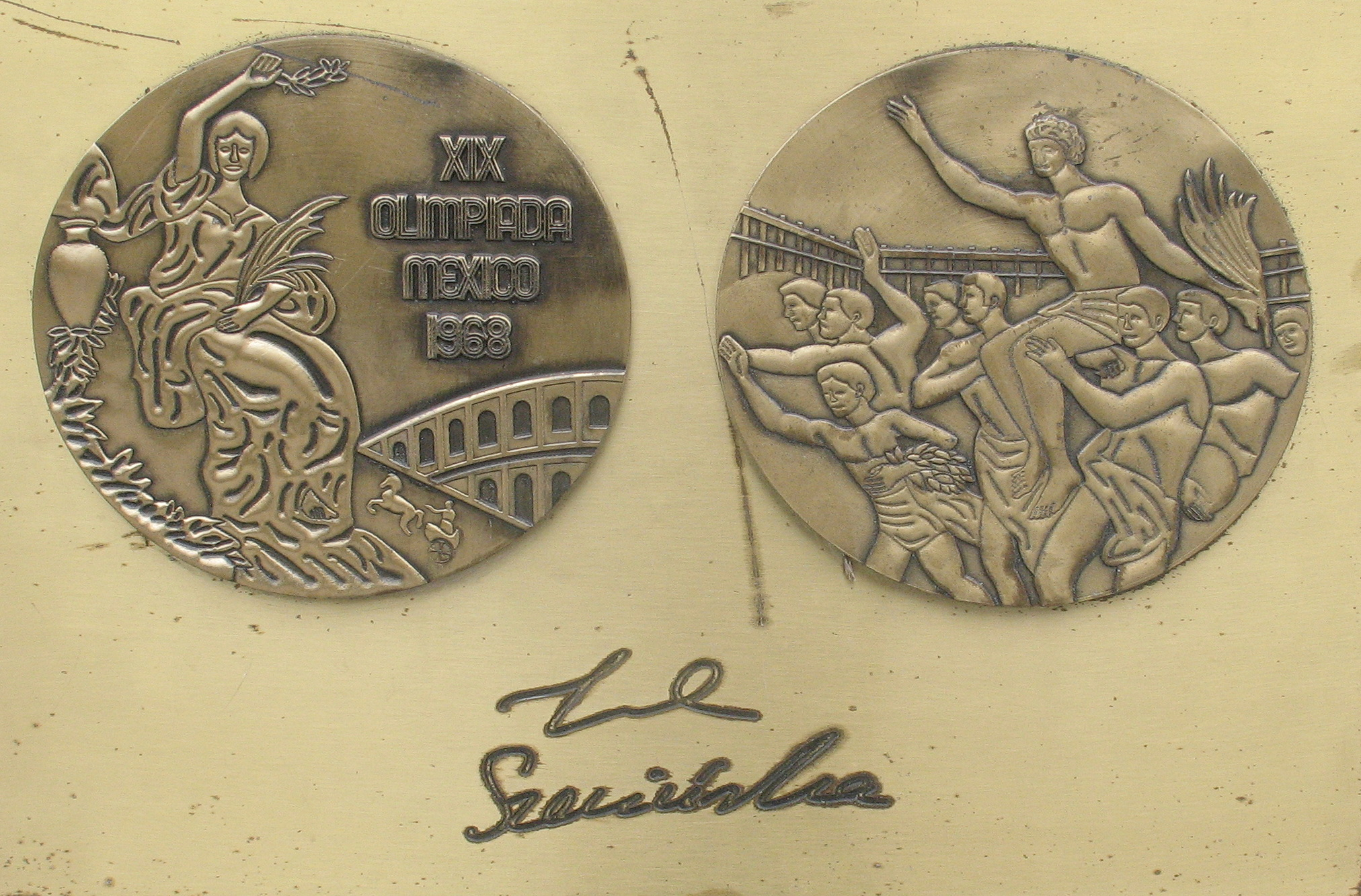
Copy of I. Szewińska medal and autograph in Sports Star Avenue in Dziwnów

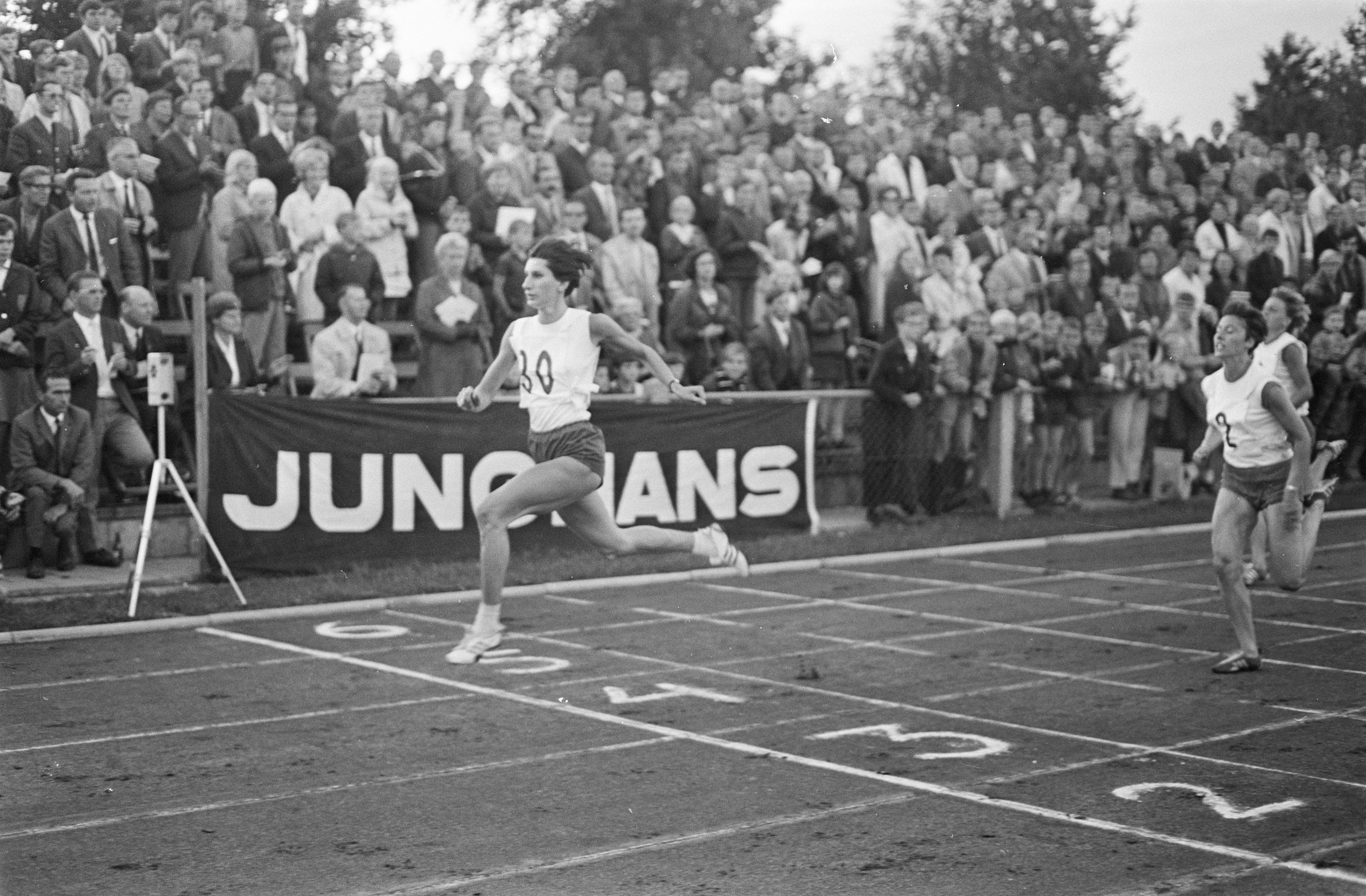
Irena Szewińska in 1968, Uden, Netherlands

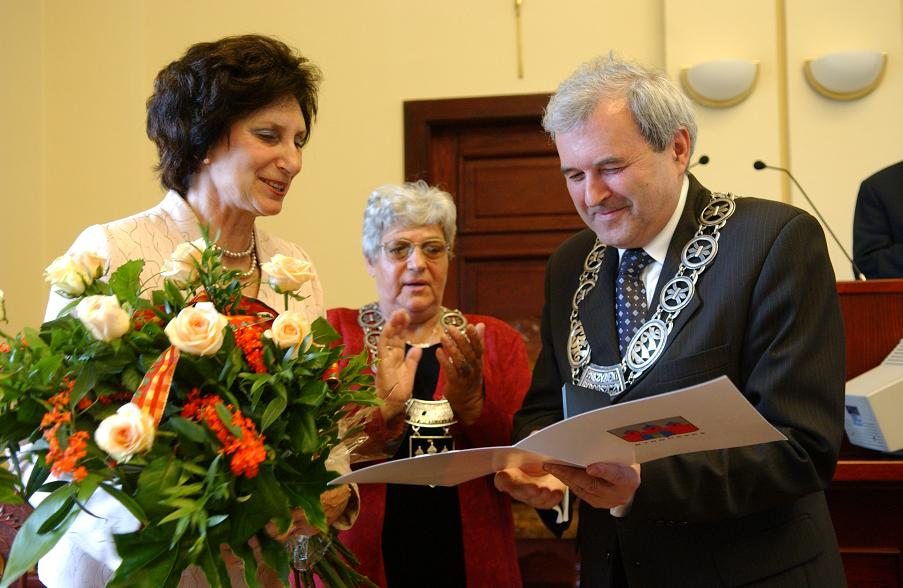
Irena Szewińska with Konstanty Dombrowicz

Irena Szewińska (née Kirszenstein; Polish pronunciation: [iˈrɛna ʂɛˈviɲska]; 24 May 1946 – 29 June 2018) was a Polish sprinter who was one of the world's foremost track athletes for nearly two decades, in multiple events. She won a total of seven Olympic medals including three golds. She is the only athlete in history, male or female, to have held the world record in the 100 m, the 200 m and the 400 m events. She was voted the Polish Sports Personality of the Year four times. In 2016, she was awarded Poland's highest decoration, the Order of the White Eagle.

== Personal life ==
Irena Kirszenstein was born in Leningrad to a Polish-Jewish family. Her father came from Warsaw and mother from Kiev. They met in Samarkand where they studied at the time, and in 1947 moved to Warsaw.

In 1967, she married her coach, Janusz Szewiński, who also competed in hurdles at the national level and later worked as a sports photographer. They have two sons, Andrzej Szewiński (born 1970), who played volleyball for the Poland men's national volleyball team and later became a senator, and Jarosław (born 1981).

In 1970, Szewińska graduated from the University of Warsaw with an MSc degree in economics.

On 29 June 2018, her death was announced by her husband. She died of cancer aged 72 in Warsaw at the Military Institute of Medicine on Szaserów Street. Commenting on her death in a tweet, Polish president Andrzej Duda called her "the first lady of Polish sport." Szewińska was buried as a Catholic at the "Avenue of the Meritorious" in the Powązki Military Cemetery in Warsaw.

In 2020, she was posthumously honoured with a World Athletics Heritage Plaque, one of the first ever awarded, during a ceremony before the Szewinska Memorial meeting in Bydgoszcz. In 2021, she was voted Polish Sportsperson of the Century by the readers of the Przegląd Sportowy magazine. During her career, she had been elected as Polish Sports Personality of the Year four times by the same magazine.

== Career ==
Between 1964 and 1980, she participated in five Olympic Games, winning seven medals (the most by any Polish athlete), three of them gold. She also broke six world records and is the only athlete (male or female) to have held a world record in the 100 m, 200 m and the 400 m events. She also won 10 medals in European Championships. Between 1965 and 1979, she gathered 26 national titles and set 38 records in the 100–400 m sprint and long jump.

At her first Olympics in Tokyo in 1964, she took a silver medal in the long jump and 200 metres, and ran the second leg of the gold medal-winning 4 × 100 metres relay team.

She was a double sprint winner at the World Student Games in Budapest in 1965. In the same year she set her first world record, breaking Wyomia Tyus' 11.2 s from the previous year with an 11.1 s clocking in Prague, Czechoslovakia, July 9, 1965. She won the British WAAA Championships title at the 1965 WAAA Championships.

In 1966, at the European Athletics Championships she won Gold in the long jump, 200 metres and 4 × 100 metres relay; and took a silver in the 100 metre sprint.

At her second Olympics in Mexico, She won a bronze in the 100 metres, but failed to qualify for the Long Jump final. She recovered from that disappointment, to win the gold medal in the 200 metres in a new world-record time. In the sprint relay the Polish team dropped the baton on the final exchange in the semi-final and finished last.

After giving birth to her son, in 1971, she managed a bronze medal in the long jump at the European Championships in Helsinki. She would compete in the three events at the Munich Olympics in 1972, the two sprints and the long jump. She would come away with a bronze medal in the 200 metres.

In the 1974 season, she became the first woman to break the 50-second barrier for 400 metres, and she set a new world record of 22.21 s for 200 metres. At the European Championships in the Rome she won the sprint double of 100 metres and 200 metres, beating the favoured GDR sprinter Renate Stecher; and ran the anchor leg on the 4 × 100 metres relay team which took the bronze. She was ranked number 1 in the world in the 100, 200 and 400 m events in 1974.

She would win her final Olympic medal in Montreal in 1976, by winning the gold in the 400 metres in a world record time of 49.28. At the inaugural World Cup of Track and Field in 1977, she would win both 200 metres and 400 metres; beating both favoured East German runners Bärbel Wöckel and Marita Koch respectively. She would be ranked number 1 in the world for 200 m and 400 m in 1976 and 1977.

In her final appearance at the European Championships at 32 year of age, she managed to win a bronze in the 400 metres and the 4 × 400 metres relay.

She was ranked number 1 in the world 7 times in the 200 metres; 4 times in the 400 metres, and 2 times in the 100 metres; as well as 3 times in the long jump. Over-all, she was ranked 15 years in the top ten at 200 metres, also 4 times number 2, twice at number 3, which just leaves 2 years outside the top 3; (from 1964 to 1977 she was ranked in the top 3 – 200 metre runners in the world) a remarkable achievement. She was ranked 12 times in the 100 metres, 8 times in the long jump and 6 times in the 400 metres (which she took up in 1974).

She obtained United Press International Athlete of the Year Award, Female 1974. She won the European Sportsperson of the Year presented by the Polish Press Agency twice in 1966 and 1974.

In 1998, Szewińska became a member of the International Olympic Committee. She was the president of the Polish Athletic Association 1997–2009.

On 3 August 2005, she was elected as the third woman to the IAAF (International Association of Athletics Federations) Council during the first session of the 45th IAAF Congress in Helsinki.

She was a member of the International Jewish Sports Hall of Fame, and the IAAF Hall of Fame.

== International competitions ==
Year	Competition	Venue	Position	Event	Result
Representing Poland
1964	European Junior Games	Warsaw, Poland	1st	200 m	23.5
1964	European Junior Games	Warsaw, Poland	1st	4 × 100 m relay	46.6
1964	European Junior Games	Warsaw, Poland	1st	Long jump	6.19 m
1964	Olympic Games	Tokyo, Japan	2nd	200 m	23.1
1964	Olympic Games	Tokyo, Japan	1st	4 × 100 m relay	43.6
1964	Olympic Games	Tokyo, Japan	2nd	Long jump	6.60 m
1965	Universiade	Budapest, Hungary	1st	100 m	11.3
1965	Universiade	Budapest, Hungary	1st	200 m	23.5
1965	Universiade	Budapest, Hungary	2nd	4 × 100 m relay	46.1
1966	European Championships	Budapest, Hungary	2nd	100 m	11.5
1966	European Championships	Budapest, Hungary	1st	200 m	23.1
1966	European Championships	Budapest, Hungary	1st	4 × 100 m relay	44.49
1966	European Championships	Budapest, Hungary	1st	Long jump	6.55 m
1968	Olympic Games	Mexico City, Mexico	3rd	100 m	11.1
1968	Olympic Games	Mexico City, Mexico	1st	200 m	22.5
1968	Olympic Games	Mexico City, Mexico	14th (h)	4 × 100 m relay	53.0
1968	Olympic Games	Mexico City, Mexico	16th (q)	Long jump	6.19 m
1969	European Indoor Games	Belgrade, Serbia	1st	50 m	6.4
1969	European Indoor Games	Belgrade, Serbia	2nd	Medley relay	4:53.2
1969	European Indoor Games	Belgrade, Serbia	1st	Long jump	6.38 m
1970	Universiade	Turin, Italy	25th (h)	100 m	12.3
1971	European Indoor Championships	Sofia, Bulgaria	4th	60 m	7.5
1971	European Indoor Championships	Sofia, Bulgaria	2nd	Long jump	6.56 m
1971	European Championships	Helsinki, Finland	6th	100 m	11.63
1971	European Championships	Helsinki, Finland	3rd	200 m	23.32
1971	European Championships	Helsinki, Finland	5th	Long jump	6.62 m
1972	European Indoor Championships	Grenoble, France	6th	50 m	6.39
1972	Olympic Games	Munich, West Germany	13th (sf)	100 m	11.54
1972	Olympic Games	Munich, West Germany	3rd	200 m	22.74
1973	European Indoor Championships	Rotterdam, Netherlands	4th	60 m	7.35
1974	European Indoor Championships	Gothenburg, Sweden	3rd	60 m	7.20
1974	European Championships	Rome, Italy	1st	100 m	11.13
1974	European Championships	Rome, Italy	1st	200 m	22.51
1974	European Championships	Rome, Italy	3rd	4 × 100 m relay	43.48
1974	European Championships	Rome, Italy	4th	4 × 400 m relay	3:26.4
1975	European Indoor Championships	Katowice, Poland	3rd	60 m	7.26
1976	Olympic Games	Montreal, Canada	1st	400 m	49.28 (WR)
1977	European Indoor Championships	San Sebastián, Spain	7th (h)	60 m	7.42
1977	World Cup	Düsseldorf, West Germany	1st	200 m	22.72^{1}
1977	World Cup	Düsseldorf, West Germany	1st	400 m	49.52^{1}
1977	World Cup	Düsseldorf, West Germany	2nd	4 × 400 m relay	3:25.8^{1}
1978	European Championships	Prague, Czechoslovakia	3rd	400 m	50.40
1978	European Championships	Prague, Czechoslovakia	5th	4 × 100 m relay	43.83
1978	European Championships	Prague, Czechoslovakia	3rd	4 × 400 m relay	3:26.76
1979	World Cup	Montreal, Canada	3rd	400 m	51.15^{1}
1979	World Cup	Montreal, Canada	4th	4 × 400 m relay	3:27.39^{1}
1980	Olympic Games	Moscow, Soviet Union	16th (sf)	400 m	53.13

^{1}Representing Europe

== See also ==
- Polish records in athletics
- Poland at the Summer Olympics
- List of Poles
- List of Jewish Olympic medalists

Awards
Preceded by None	United Press International; Athlete of the Year; 1974	Succeeded by (Romania) Nadia Comăneci
Preceded by None	Women's Track & Field Athlete of the Year; 1974	Succeeded by (Soviet Union) Faina Melnik
Sporting positions
Preceded by (East Germany) Renate Stecher	Women's 200 m Best Year Performance; 1974	Succeeded by (East Germany) Renate Stecher
Preceded by (East Germany) Bärbel Wöckel	Women's 200 m Best Year Performance; 1977	Succeeded by (East Germany) Marita Koch
