= Ildikó Jónás =

Hungarian sprinter

Personal information
- Nationality: Hungarian
- Born: 19 February 1941 (age 85) Budapest, Hungary

Sport
- Sport: Sprinting
- Event: 4 × 100 metres relay
Medal record
Representing Hungary
Summer Universiade
| Bronze medal – third place | 1965 Budapest | 4x100m relay |

Ildikó Jónás (born 19 February 1941) is a Hungarian sprinter. She competed in the women's 4 × 100 metres relay at the 1960 Summer Olympics.
