= Truus Hennipman =

Dutch sprinter (1943–2024)

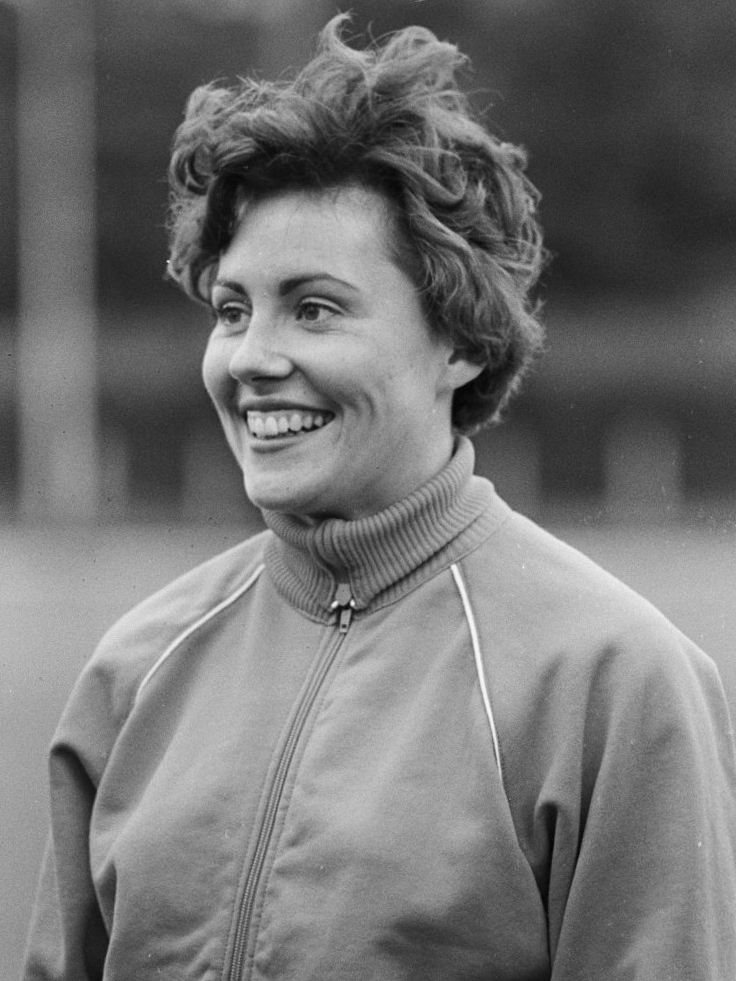
- Hennipman in 1966

Personal information
- Born: 15 June 1943 Amsterdam, German-occupied Netherlands
- Died: 17 August 2024 (aged 81)
- Height: 1.62 m (5 ft 4 in)
- Weight: 53 kg (117 lb)

Sport
- Sport: Sprint
- Club: De Bataven, Leiden

Geertruida Leonie Hennipman-Cruiming (better known as Truus Hennipman; 15 June 1943 – 17 August 2024) was a Dutch sprinter. She was part of the Dutch 4×100 m relay team that finished in fourth place at the 1968 Summer Olympics, equaling the world record in the heats. Individually, she failed to reach the finals in the 100 m and 200 m events. Her personal bests are 11.59 seconds in the 100 m and 23.43 seconds in the 200 m, both achieved in 1968.

Hennipman died on 17 August 2024, at the age of 81.
