= Athletics at the 1965 Summer Universiade =

Athletics at the IV Summer Universiade
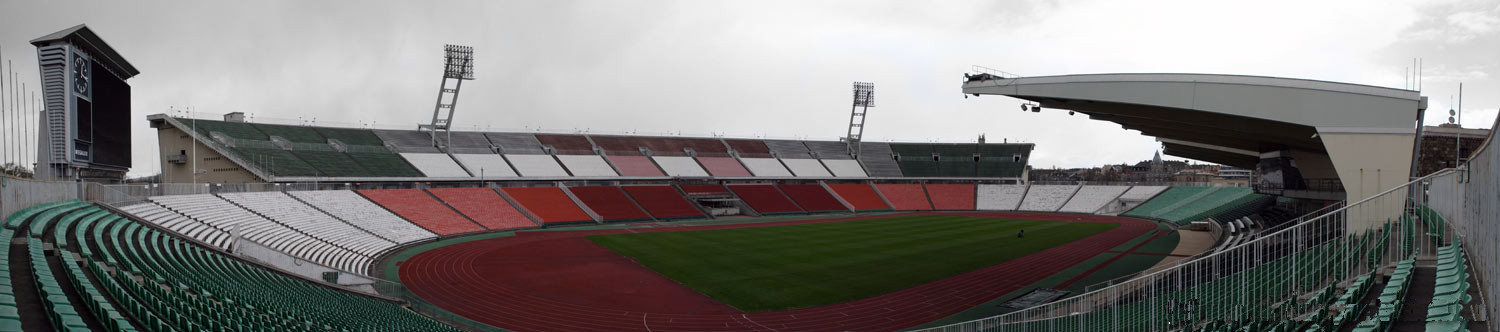
- The host stadium
- Dates: 25 – 29 August
- Host city: Budapest, Hungary
- Venue: People's Stadium
- Events: 30

Athletics events were contested at the 1965 Summer Universiade in Budapest, Hungary.

== Medal summary ==
=== Men ===
Event	Gold		Silver		Bronze	
100 metres (wind: +5.0 m/s)	Hideo Iijima (JPN)	10.1	George Anderson (USA)	10.1	Harry Jerome (CAN)	10.2
200 metres (wind: +2.5 m/s)	Edvin Ozolin (URS)	21.0w	George Anderson (USA)	21.0w	Menzies Campbell (GBR)	21.2w
400 metres	Sergio Bello (ITA)	46.8	Fred van Herpen (NED)	46.9	Lynn Saunders (USA)	47.2
800 metres	Bill Crothers (CAN)	1:47.7	George Germann (USA)	1:47.8	Rudolf Klaban (AUT)	1:48.2
1500 metres	Bodo Tümmler (FRG)	3:46.2	Andy Green (GBR)	3:46.7	Zbigniew Wójcik (POL)	3:47.3
5000 metres	Keisuke Sawaki (JPN)	13:45.2	Lutz Philipp (FRG)	13:46.6	Fergus Murray (GBR)	13:52.6
110 metres hurdles (wind: +0.6 m/s)	Eddy Ottoz (ITA)	13.6	Giovanni Cornacchia (ITA)	13.9	Willie Davenport (USA)	14.0
400 metres hurdles	Roberto Frinolli (ITA)	50.5	Robert Poirier (FRA)	50.7	Ron Whitney (USA)	51.1
4 × 100 metres relay	West Germany (FRG); Gert Metz; Fritz Obersiebrasse; Hans-Jürgen Felsen; Rudolf Sundermann	39.9	Soviet Union (URS); Nikolay Politiko; Edvin Ozolin; Boris Zubov; Igor Ter-Ovanesyan	40.1	France (FRA); Alain Roy; Jean-Paul Lambrot; Marc Bienvenu; Pierre Burrellier	40.3
4 × 400 metres relay	Italy (ITA); Sergio Bello; Gian Paolo Iraldo; Bruno Bianchi; Roberto Frinolli	3:08.5	Hungary (HUN); Csaba Csutorás; István Gyulai; Gyula Rábai; László Mihályfi	3:08.7	West Germany (FRG); Werner Tiemann; Manfred Hanike; Dirk von Maltitz; Fritz Roth	3:08.8
High jump	Valeriy Skvortsov (URS)	2.14	Edward Czernik (POL)	2.07	János Medovarszki (HUN); Kuniyoshi Sugioka (JPN)	2.07
Pole vault	John Pennel (USA)	5.00	Hennadiy Bleznitsov (URS)	4.90	Igor Feld (URS)	4.80
Long jump	Igor Ter-Ovanesyan (URS)	8.19	Lynn Davies (GBR)	7.89	Oleg Aleksandrov (URS)	7.53
Triple jump	Henrik Kalocsai (HUN)	16.36	Drágán Ivanov (HUN)	16.35	Michael Sauer (FRG)	16.35
Shot put	Randy Matson (USA)	20.31	Nikolay Karasyov (URS)	18.68	Eduard Gushchin (URS)	18.45
Discus throw	Lars Haglund (SWE)	57.86	Jiří Žemba (TCH)	56.22	George Puce (CAN)	56.20
Hammer throw	Gyula Zsivótzky (HUN)	67.74	Gennadiy Kondrashov (URS)	65.76	Yuriy Bakarinov (URS)	63.74
Javelin throw	Rolf Herings (FRG)	79.26	Vanni Rodeghiero (ITA)	77.60	Lennart Hedmark (SWE)	76.94
Decathlon	Bill Toomey (USA)	7566	József Bakai (HUN)	7443	Manfred Pflugbeil (FRG)	7413

=== Women ===
Event	Gold		Silver		Bronze	
100 metres (wind: +2.6 m/s)	Irena Kirszenstein (POL)	11.3	Miguelina Cobián (CUB)	11.5	Liz Gill (GBR)	11.6
200 metres (wind: +1.3 m/s)	Irena Kirszenstein (POL)	23.5	Miguelina Cobián (CUB)	23.9	Liz Gill (GBR)	24.0
800 metres	Laine Erik (URS)	2:06.2	Antje Gleichfeldt (FRG)	2:06.6	Abby Hoffman (CAN)	2:07.8
80 metres hurdles	Danuta Straszyńska (POL)	10.6	Snezhana Kerkova (BUL)	10.8	Tatyana Ilyina (URS)	10.9
4 × 100 metres relay	Soviet Union (URS); Lyudmila Samotyosova; Renāte Lāce; Vera Popkova; Tatyana Shchelkanova	45.5	Poland (POL); Irena Kirszenstein; Mirosława Sałacińska; Danuta Straszyńska; Irena Woldańska	46.1	Hungary (HUN); Irén Buskó; Annamária Kovács; Ildikó Jónás; Ida Such	46.4
High jump	Yordanka Blagoeva (BUL)	1.65	Klara Pushkaryeva (URS)	1.65	Nevenka Mrinjek (YUG)	1.63
Long jump	Tatyana Shchelkanova (URS)	6.42	Viorica Viscopoleanu (ROM)	6.18	Dorothee Sander (FRG)	5.98
Shot put	Tamara Press (URS)	18.31	Nadezhda Chizhova (URS)	17.27	Judit Bognár (HUN)	15.37
Discus throw	Jolán Kleiber-Kontsek (HUN)	55.66	Judit Stugner (HUN)	55.14	Tamara Press (URS)	53.62
Javelin throw	Mihaela Peneş (ROM)	59.22	Michèle Demys (FRA)	52.71	Valentina Popova (URS)	52.65
Pentathlon	Tatyana Shchelkanova (URS)	4802	Annamária Kovács (HUN)	4606	Yelena Kolnich (URS)	4479

== Medal table ==
Rank	Nation	Gold	Silver	Bronze	Total
1	Soviet Union (URS)	8	6	8	22
2	Italy (ITA)	4	2	0	6
3	Hungary (HUN)	3	5	3	11
4	United States (USA)	3	3	3	9
5	West Germany (FRG)	3	2	4	9
6	Poland (POL)	3	2	1	6
7	Japan (JPN)	2	0	1	3
8	Bulgaria (BUL)	1	1	0	2
8	Romania (ROM)	1	1	0	2
10	Canada (CAN)	1	0	3	4
11	Sweden (SWE)	1	0	1	2
12	Great Britain (GBR)	0	2	4	6
13	France (FRA)	0	2	1	3
14	Cuba (CUB)	0	2	0	2
15	Czechoslovakia (TCH)	0	1	0	1
15	Netherlands (NED)	0	1	0	1
17	Austria (AUT)	0	0	1	1
17	Yugoslavia (YUG)	0	0	1	1
Totals (18 entries)		30	30	31	91

== See also ==
- FISU World University Games
- University and college sport
