= Elfgard Schittenhelm =

German sprinter

Personal information
- Born: 13 September 1947 (age 79) Stuttgart, West Germany

Sport
- Sport: Track and field
Medal record
Representing West Germany
European Championships
Gold medal – first place	1971 Helsinki	4×100 m
Silver medal – second place	1974 Rome	4×100 m
Bronze medal – third place	1971 Helsinki	100 m
European Indoor Championships
Gold medal – first place	1972 Grenoble	4×180 m
Silver medal – second place	1970 Vienna	4×200 m
Silver medal – second place	1970 Vienna	Medley relay
Silver medal – second place	1971 Sofia	4×200 m
Summer Universiade
Silver medal – second place	1973 Moscow	100 m

Elfgard Sibylle Schittenhelm, née Weismann, (born 13 September 1947) is a retired German sprinter.

Schittenhelm competed for SpVgg Holzgerlingen and later for OSC Berlin.

== Achievements ==
Year	Tournament	Venue	Result	Extra
1971	European Indoor Championships	Sofia, Bulgaria	2nd	4 × 200 m relay
1971	European Championships	Helsinki, Finland	3rd	100 m
1971	European Championships	Helsinki, Finland	1st	4 × 100 m relay
1972	European Indoor Championships	Grenoble, France	1st	4 × 180 m relay
1973	Universiade	Moscow, Soviet Union	2nd	100 m
1974	European Championships	Rome, Italy	2nd	4 × 100 m relay
