= Nadezhda Besfamilnaya =

Soviet-Russian sprinter (born 1950)

Personal information
- Native name: Надежда Бесфамильная
- Born: 27 December 1950 (age 75) Moscow, Russian SFSR, Soviet Union
- Height: 166 cm (5 ft 5 in)
- Weight: 55 kg (121 lb)

Sport
- Country: Soviet Union
- Sport: Athletics
- Events: 100 metres; 200 metres; 4 × 100 metres relay
- Club: CSKA Moscow
- Coached by: Zoya Petrova
- Retired: 1978

Achievements and titles
- Personal bests: 100 metres: 11.41 (1976); 200 metres: 22.8 (1972)
Medal record
Women's athletics
Representing Soviet Union
Olympic Games
Bronze medal – third place	1976 Montreal	4×100 m
European Championships
Bronze medal – third place	1971 Helsinki	4×100 m
European Indoor Championships
Gold medal – first place	1970 Vienna	4×200 m
Universiade
Gold medal – first place	1973 Moscow	4×100 m

Nadezhda Viktorovna Besfamilnaya (Russian: Надежда Викторовна Бесфамильная, born 27 December 1950) is a Soviet-born Russian former sprint athlete. She won a bronze medal in the 4 × 400 metres relay at the 1976 Summer Olympics.

== Competitive career ==
Besfamilnaya trained at CSKA Moscow, the Armed Forces sports society in Moscow. From a young age she was coached by Zoya Petrova, who remained her coach throughout her career.

She made her Olympic debut at the 1972 Summer Olympics in Munich, Germany. Her most successful race was the 4 × 100 metres relay, in which she finished fifth with teammates Galina Bukharina, Marina Sidorova, and Lyudmila Zharkova. Besfamilnaya also qualified for the semifinals in the 200 metres but did not advance to the medal round. She was scheduled to compete in the 100 metres but did not start.

She represented the Soviet Union at the 1976 Summer Olympics in Montreal, Canada and won Olympic bronze in the 4 × 100 metres relay with her teammates Tatyana Prorochenko, Lyudmila Maslakova, and Vera Anisimova.

== Coaching career ==
Following her retirement from competition, Besfamilnaya worked at a children's sports school, for a future career as a sprinting coach. After six years spent developing the "necessary pedagogical skills" at the school, she made the jump to professional coaching and began a coaching partnership with Zoya Petrova, her former coach.
