= Annamária Tóth =

Hungarian athletics competitor (1945–2023)

Personal information
- Born: 14 September 1945 Budapest, Hungary
- Died: 16 July 2023 (aged 77) Konstanz, Baden-Württemberg, Germany

Sport
- Sport: Track and field
Medal record
Representing Hungary
Olympic Games
Bronze medal – third place	1968 Mexico City	Pentathlon
Summer Universiade
Silver medal – second place	1965 Budapest	Pentathlon
Bronze medal – third place	1965 Budapest	4x100m relay

Annamária Tóth, née Annamária Kovács, (14 September 1945 – 16 July 2023) was a Hungarian athlete who competed in various disciplines.

== Biography ==
Annamária Kovács was born in Budapest on 14 September 1945.

Tóth competed for Hungary in the 1968 Summer Olympics held in Mexico City, Mexico and won the bronze medal in the pentathlon.

Tóth also won nine Hungarian Championships between 1966 and 1969 in the 100 and 200 meter sprints, the 100 meter hurdles, long jump and pentathlon.

Tóth was named Hungarian Sportswoman of The Year in 1967.

Annamária Tóth died in July 2023, at the age of 77.

Awards
Preceded by Zsuzsa Szabó	Hungarian Sportswoman of The Year; 1967	Succeeded by Angéla Németh
