= Annegret Kroniger =

German sprinter (1952–2025)

Medal record

Women's athletics

Representing West Germany

Olympic Games
Silver medal – second place	1976 Montreal	4×100 m

European Championships
Silver medal – second place	1974 Rome	4×100 m

European Indoor Championships
Gold medal – first place	1972 Grenoble	4×180 m
Silver medal – second place	1970 Vienna	4×200 m
Silver medal – second place	1971 Sofia	4×200 m

Annegret "Anne" Kroniger (24 September 1952 – 22 November 2025) was a German athlete, who mainly competed in the 100 metres.

She was born in Bochum, North Rhine-Westphalia. She competed for West Germany at the 1976 Summer Olympics in the women's 4 × 100 metres held in Montreal, Quebec, Canada, where she won the silver medal with her teammates Elvira Possekel, Inge Helten and Olympic 100 metre champion Annegret Richter.

Kroniger died after a long and serious illness on 22 November 2025, at the age of 73.
