= Anneli Olsson (athlete) =

Swedish sprinter

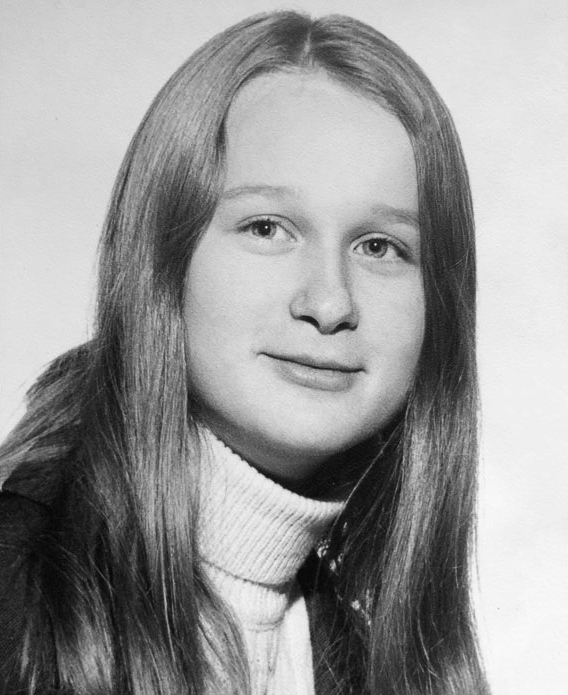

Personal information
- Full name: Anneli Marita Olsson
- Nationality: Swedish
- Born: 8 June 1952 (age 73) Gothenburg, Sweden

Sport
- Sport: Sprinting
- Event: 4 × 100 metres relay
- Club: Mölndals AIK

Anneli Marita Olsson (later Johansson; born 8 June 1952) is a Swedish sprinter. She competed in the women's 4 × 100 metres relay at the 1972 Summer Olympics. Her team was disqualified for dropping the batton.
