= Inge Helten =

German sprinter

Personal information
- Full name: Ingeborg Helten
- Born: 31 December 1950 (age 75) Westum, Sinzig, Rhineland-Palatinate
Medal record
Women's athletics
Representing West Germany
Olympic Games
Silver medal – second place	1976 Montreal	4×100 m
Bronze medal – third place	1976 Montreal	100 m
European Championships
Gold medal – first place	1971 Helsinki	4×100 m
Silver medal – second place	1974 Rome	4×100 m
European Indoor Championships
Gold medal – first place	1973 Rotterdam	4×170 m

Ingeborg "Inge" Helten (born 31 December 1950) is a former athlete from West Germany, who competed mainly in the 100 metres. She was born in Westum, Sinzig, Rhineland-Palatinate.

== Biography ==
She won her first international gold medal at the 1971 European Athletics Championships as a member of the 4 × 100 m relay team, where she placed 4th in the 100 metre final. She took a silver as the anchor of the 4 × 100 m relay squad in the 1974 European Championships in Rome.

Helten set a world record for 100 meters in June 1976, with an 11.04 clocking; she competed for West Germany at the 1976 Summer Olympics held in Montreal, Quebec, Canada in the 100 metres, winning a bronze medal behind teammate Annegret Richter and East German Renate Stecher. She placed 5th in the 200 meter final, where the top 5 women were German. She then joined with Annegret and fellow West Germans Elvira Possekel and Annegret Kroniger in the 4 × 100 m relay, where they won the silver medal behind the East Germans in 42.59 to 42.55.

== See also ==
- German all-time top lists - 100 metres

Records
Preceded by (East Germany) Renate Stecher	Women's 100 m World Record Holder; June 13, 1976 – July 25, 1976	Succeeded by (West Germany) Annegret Richter
