= Urszula Jóźwik =

Polish sprinter

Personal information
- Nationality: Polish
- Born: 25 August 1947 (age 78) Łódź, Poland
- Education: AWF Poznań
- Height: 1.63 m (5 ft 4 in)
- Weight: 52 kg (115 lb)

Sport
- Sport: Sprinting
- Event(s): 100 metres, 200 metres
- Club: Gwardia Olsztyn
Medal record
Representing Poland
Summer Universiade
Silver medal – second place	1973 Moscow	4x100m relay

Urszula Bronisława Jóźwik (née Styranka; later Szubzda; born 25 August 1947) is a Polish sprinter. She competed in the 4 × 100 metres relay at the 1968 Summer Olympics and the 1972 Summer Olympics.

== Personal life ==
Her first husband was Polish hurdler and sports commentator Marek Jóźwik.

== Personal bests ==
Outdoor

- 100 metres – 11.59 (1973)
- 200 metres – 23.52
- 400 metres – 54.0
