= Val Peat =

British sprinter (1947–1997)

Personal information
- Nationality: British (English)
- Born: 30 April 1947 Thurnscoe, England
- Died: 14 May 1997 (aged 50)
- Height: 165 cm (5 ft 5 in)
- Weight: 51 kg (112 lb)

Sport
- Sport: Athletics
- Event: Sprinting
- Club: Dorothy Hyman TC, Barnsley
Medal record
Women's athletics
Representing England
Commonwealth Games
Silver medal – second place	1970 Edinburgh	4 x 100m relay
Representing Great Britain
European Championships
Bronze medal – third place	1969 Athens	200 metres
Bronze medal – third place	1969 Athens	4 × 100 metres relay

Valerie Peat, née Valerie Wild, (30 April 1947 – 14 May 1997) was a British international sprinter who competed at the Olympic Games.

== Biography ==
Peat became both the national 100 metres champion and national 200 metres champion after winning the British WAAA Championships titles at the 1968 WAAA Championships.

Later that year at the 1968 Olympic Games in Mexico City, Peat represented Great Britain in the women's 100 metres at the 1968 Summer Olympics.

Peat represented England and won a silver medal in the 4 x 100 metres relay, at the 1970 British Commonwealth Games in Edinburgh, Scotland.
