= Galina Bukharina =

Soviet sprinter (born 1945)

Personal information
- Full name: Galina Petrovna Bukharina
- Nationality: Soviet Union
- Born: 14 February 1945 (age 81) Voronezh, Russian SFSR, Soviet Union
- Height: 1.56 m (5 ft 1 in)

Sport
- Sport: Athletics
- Event: 100 m

Achievements and titles
- Personal best: 11.69 (1972)
Medal record
Women's athletics
Representing Soviet Union
Olympic Games
Bronze medal – third place	1968 Mexico City	4×100m
European Championships
Bronze medal – third place	1971 Helsinki	4×100m
European Indoor Championships
Gold medal – first place	1970 Vienna	4×200m

Galina Petrovna Bukharina (Russian: Галина Петровна Бухарина; born 14 February 1945) is a former Soviet track athlete and subsequent coach who is now a US citizen. She competed mainly in the 100 m and 4 × 100 m relay.

== Personal life ==
Galina was born on 14 February 1945 in Voronezh during the Soviet era. In 1989, she moved to the United States where she initially worked as an elder care aide and house cleaner. During her US stay, Galina wanted to return home after her daughter's recovery. The USSR's collapse convinced her to prolong her stay. She later became a US citizen.

== Career ==
=== Athlete ===
Bukharina trained at the Armed Forces sports society in Moscow. She competed for the Soviet Union in the 1968 Summer Olympics in the 4 × 100 m. She won the bronze medal with her teammates Lyudmila Zharkova, Vera Popkova and Lyudmila Samotyosova. She participated at the 1972 Summer Olympics.

=== Coach ===
She started coaching in the Soviet Union, and worked with the national setup for about 17 years. "I've competed in the Olympics myself but as a coach I have been more successful. I used to coach the women's (Soviet Union) 4×400 m team. They still hold the world record set under 3.15.17", she said. The record was set at the 1988 Games.

She coached for Texas State University, winning them various NCAA meets until 2011.

At 72, she was appointed as the head coach of 400 m and relay athletes of India, at National Institute of Sports from 2018 to 2022. She coached Hima Das to become 2018 World Junior Champion and set national records. Her student Muhammed Anas also won medals at various international platforms and set national records.
