= Ida Such =

Hungarian sprinter

Personal information
- Nationality: Hungarian
- Born: 6 July 1940 (age 85) Békéscsaba, Hungary

Sport
- Sport: Sprinting
- Event: 4 × 100 metres relay
Medal record
Representing Hungary
Summer Universiade
Bronze medal – third place	1965 Budapest	4x100m relay

Ida Such (born 6 July 1940) is a Hungarian sprinter. She competed in the women's 4 × 100 metres relay at the 1964 Summer Olympics.
