= Vera Popkova =

Soviet sprinter

Personal information
- Born: 2 April 1943 Chelyabinsk, Soviet Union
- Died: 29 September 2011 (aged 68) Lviv, Ukraine

Sport
- Sport: Track and field
Medal record
Representing Soviet Union
Olympic Games
Bronze medal – third place	1968 Mexico City	4×100 m
European Championships
Bronze medal – third place	1966 Budapest	200 m
Bronze medal – third place	1966 Budapest	4×100 m
Bronze medal – third place	1971 Helsinki	4×400 m
European Indoor Championships
Gold medal – first place	1970 Vienna	4×200 m
Gold medal – first place	1971 Sofia	400 m
Gold medal – first place	1971 Sofia	4×400 m
Summer Universiade
Gold medal – first place	1963 Porto Alegre	4x100m relay
Gold medal – first place	1965 Budapest	4x100m relay
Silver medal – second place	1963 Porto Alegre	100 m
Bronze medal – third place	1961 Sofia	200m

Vera Ivanovna Popkova (Russian: Вера Ивановна Попкова), née Kabreniuk, (2 April 1943 – 29 September 2011) was a Soviet track and field athlete who competed in the sprints. She had personal bests of 11.3 seconds for the 100 metres and 23.0 seconds for the 200 metres. Over her career, she won eight individual national titles in the sprints (five outdoors and three indoors).

She came to prominence by winning medals in the sprints at the 1963 Summer Universiade and the 1966 European Athletics Championships. Her greatest successes came with the Soviet relay team: in 1968 she helped set two world records in the 4 × 100 m relay and won an Olympic bronze medal at the 1968 Mexico City Games. Her international career ended on a high note with two gold medals in the 400 metres and relay at the 1971 European Athletics Indoor Championships. She was also a three-time medallist at the European Cup.

== Career ==
Born in Chelyabinsk, Popkova trained at Burevestnik in her home town. Whilst studying, she won the silver medal over 100 m at the 1963 Summer Universiade in Brazil. She earned the title Master of Sports of the USSR, International Class in 1965 and Honored Master of Sports of the USSR in 1971. She graduated from Chelyabinsk Politechnical Institute.

Popkova began competing at the top level in 1965: she won her first Soviet title that year, running over 200 metres, and placed third in the event at the 1965 European Cup. She established herself as the Soviet Union's top female sprinter the following year by winning the national indoor title in the 400 metres then taking a 100/200 m double at the outdoor national event. At the 1966 European Athletics Championships she took the 200 m bronze medal (finishing behind Polish duo Irena Kirszenstein and Ewa Kłobukowska) and got her second of the competition with the Soviet 4 × 100 metres relay team which finished third.

In 1967, she won the 100 m title at the Spartakiad and was third in the 200 m at the 1967 European Cup. She was also a double relay gold medalist for the Soviet Union at the 1967 European Indoor Games. She won another gold in the Swedish medley relay at the 1968 European Indoor Games. It was in this year that she had her greatest success with the Soviet relay team as she and her teammates set a new world record of 43.9 seconds for the 4 × 100 m relay at the Soviet championships then improved it further to 43.6 seconds at the athletics test event prior to the 1968 Mexico City Olympics. A team comprising Popkova, Lyudmila Zharkova, Galina Bukharina and Lyudmila Samotyosova ran even faster in the Olympic final, clocking 43.41 seconds, yet this was only enough for the bronze as teams from both the United States and Cuba also went under the previous world record mark. Popkova also represented her country in the 200 m event and was narrowly eliminated in the semi-finals after finishing fifth.

She did not compete internationally in 1969 but returned in 1970 with a new focus on the 400 metres. She won the Soviet title over that distance and also won her third consecutive bronze medal at the 1970 European Cup. She opened her 1971 season with a 200/400 m double at the Soviet indoor championships. At the 1971 European Athletics Indoor Championships she claimed her first major international gold medal, winning the 400 m race in a time of 53.7 seconds. She then won her second at the competition, taking the 4 × 400 metres relay gold with the Soviet Union. However, these proved to be her final medals on the international stage and she retired from athletics in 1973. She later moved to Lviv and worked as an engineer.
