= Renate Stecher =

East German sprinter

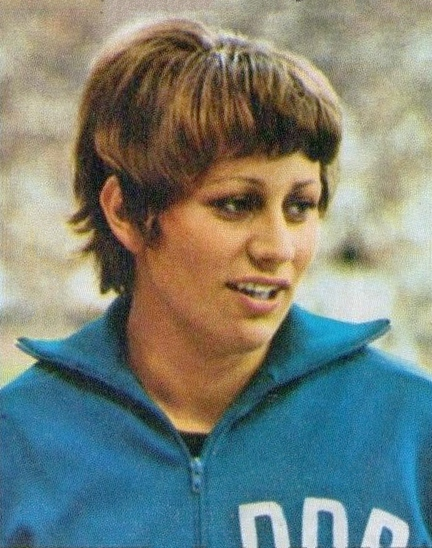

Personal information
- Born: 12 May 1950 (age 76) Süptitz, Saxony-Anhalt, East Germany
- Height: 1.70 m (5 ft 7 in)
- Weight: 71 kg (157 lb)

Sport
- Sport: Athletics
- Events: 100 m, 200 m
- Club: SC Motor Jena

Achievements and titles
- Personal bests: 100 m – 10.8 (1973); 200 m – 22.38 (1973)
Medal record
Women's athletics
Representing East Germany
Olympic Games
Gold medal – first place	1972 Munich	100 m
Gold medal – first place	1972 Munich	200 m
Gold medal – first place	1976 Montreal	4 × 100 m relay
Silver medal – second place	1972 Munich	4 × 100 m relay
Silver medal – second place	1976 Montreal	100 m
Bronze medal – third place	1976 Montreal	200 m
European Championships
Gold medal – first place	1969 Athens	4 × 100 m relay
Gold medal – first place	1971 Helsinki	100 m
Gold medal – first place	1971 Helsinki	200 m
Gold medal – first place	1974 Rome	4 × 100 m relay
Silver medal – second place	1969 Athens	200 m
Silver medal – second place	1971 Helsinki	4 × 100 m relay
Silver medal – second place	1974 Rome	100 m
Silver medal – second place	1974 Rome	200 m
European Indoor Championships
Gold medal – first place	1970 Vienna	60 m
Gold medal – first place	1971 Sofia	60 m
Gold medal – first place	1972 Grenoble	50 m
Gold medal – first place	1974 Gothenburg	60 m
Summer Universiade
Gold medal – first place	1970 Turin	100 m
Gold medal – first place	1970 Turin	200 m

Renate Stecher (German pronunciation: [ʁənaːtə ˈʃtɛçɐ], audio; née Renate Meißner; born 12 May 1950) is a German (former East German) sprint runner and a triple Olympic champion. She held 34 world records and was the first woman to run 100 metres within 11 seconds.

== Biography ==
Born as Renate Meißner, she was a very talented athlete, also competing in the high jump and pentathlon. She debuted internationally at the 1969 European Championships, where she – as a last minute substitute – won a silver medal in the 200 m and a gold in the 4 × 100 m relay.

In 1970 she was the World Student Games Champion in both the 100 and 200 metres.

Renate won five national 100m titles 1970–75. She also won the 200 on 4 occasions.

At the next European Championships, in 1971, she won both the 100 and 200 m and the silver in the relay. At that time, she was already competing as Renate Stecher, having married hurdler Gerd Stecher the previous year.

At the 1972 Summer Olympics, Stecher repeated that performance. She won the 100 m in time of 11.07, which was only in 1976 recognised as world record, which had been measured in tenths of seconds before (the times in tenths were later corrected). She also equalled the world record in the 200 meters with a time of 22.40. The following year, Stecher set (hand timed) world records in both sprint events, also becoming the first woman to beat 11 seconds. She clocked 10.9 and 10.8 for the 100 metres and 22.1 for the 200 metres.

Stecher also won the 200 m. Wilma van den Berg of the Netherlands had qualified for the semifinals, and the 23.22 that she ran in the quarterfinals was faster than the time in the quarterfinals of Stecher. However, after the killing of 11 Israeli athletes in the Munich Massacre, and the Olympics not being cancelled, van den Berg withdrew from the competition in sympathy with the Israeli victims. She said that she was leaving in protest of the "obscene" decision to continue with the Olympic Games.

In Rome at the 1974 European Championships she was defeated in both the 100 m and 200 m, by Irena Szewińska of Poland and had to settle for silver in both distances. However the GDR 4 × 100 m relay team, in which Stecher ran the second leg, won the gold medal in a world record time.

At the 1976 Summer Olympics, Stecher again competed in the three sprint events, winning medals in all three once again. She was beaten for the 100 m title by Annegret Richter, and came third in a 200 m race with five German women in the first five positions. With the 4 × 100 m relay team they beat West Germany, taking revenge for the race four years earlier.

== Retirement ==
Following the release of East German secret service files, it was revealed that many of the country's athletes were involved with a state-sponsored drug program. The files document that Stecher had wanted to step down her drug use after the 1972 Olympics, so that she could safely have children. Raelene Boyle, who had finished second to Stecher in both the 100 and 200 metres at the Olympics, stated that she felt cheated, as she believed it unlikely that Stecher would have beaten her without the use of performance-enhancing drugs.

In 2011 Stecher was inducted into Germany's Sports Hall of Fame.

Records
Preceded by (Czechoslovakia) Eva Glesková	Women's 100 m World Record Holder; 30 June 1973 – 13 June 1976	Succeeded by (West Germany) Inge Helten
Sporting positions
Unknown	Women's 200 m Best Year Performance; 1972–1973	Succeeded by (Poland) Irena Szewińska
Preceded by (Poland) Irena Szewińska	Women's 200 m Best Year Performance; 1975	Succeeded by (East Germany) Bärbel Wöckel
