= Elvira Possekel =

German sprinter

Personal information
- Born: 11 April 1953 (age 73) Cologne, West Germany
Medal record
Women's athletics
Representing West Germany
Olympic Games
Silver medal – second place	1976 Montreal	4×100 m
European Indoor Championships
Bronze medal – third place	1976 Munich	60 m

Elvira Possekel (born 11 April 1953) is a West German athlete, who competed mainly in the 100 metres.

Possekel competed for West Germany in the 1976 Summer Olympics held in Montreal, Quebec, Canada in the 4 × 100 m relay, where she won the silver medal with her teammates: 100 m bronze medalist Inge Helten, Olympic 100 m champion Annegret Richter and Annegret Kroniger.

In 1977, Possekel was part of the European Select 4 × 100 m relay team, who ran 42.51 secs (1 hundredth outside the WR) to win at the first World Cup.
