= Karin Lundgren (athlete) =

Swedish sprinter (born 1944)

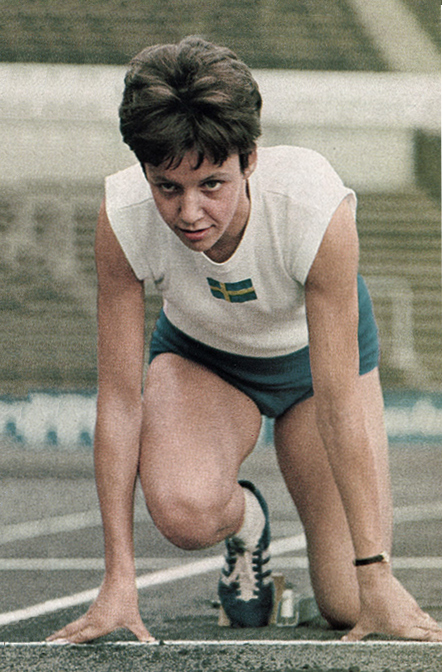
- Karin Wallgren in 1967

Personal information
- Born: Karin Wallgren; 19 May 1944 (age 82) Gothenburg, Sweden
- Height: 1.66 m (5 ft 5 in)
- Weight: 56 kg (123 lb)

Sport
- Sport: Athletics
- Event: 100–400 m
- Club: GKIK, Göteborg

Achievements and titles
- Personal bests: 100 m – 11.5 (1967); 200 m – 23.49 (1970); 400 m – 52.8 (1970)
Medal record
Representing Sweden
European Indoor Games
Gold medal – first place	1967 Prague	400 m

Karin Elisabeth Lundgren (née Wallgren on 19 May 1944) is a retired Swedish sprinter. She competed at the 1968 and 1972 Summer Olympics in various 100–400 m events (five in total), but failed to reach the finals. She won the 400 m contest at the 1967 European Indoor Games, and placed fifth at the 1969 European Athletics Championships and fourth at the 1971 European Athletics Indoor Championships.

Wallgren-Lundgren won the national championships in the 100 m (1966 and 1968–71), 200 m (1962, 1965–66, 1968–70 and 1972), 400 m (1966 and 1968–72), and various relays (24 times). She held national records over 100 m, 200 m and 400 m. After retiring from competitions she was deputy chairman in Swedish Athletics Association.
