= Helen Golden (athlete) =

British sprinter

Personal information
- Nationality: British (Scottish)
- Born: 16 May 1953 (age 72) Edinburgh, Scotland
- Height: 165 cm (5 ft 5 in)
- Weight: 54 kg (119 lb)

Sport
- Sport: Athletics
- Event: Sprints
- Club: Edinburgh Southern Harriers

Helen Golden (born 16 May 1953) is a former British sprinter who competed for Scotland and Great Britain between 1969 and 1978. She represented Scotland at three Commonwealth Games and Great Britain at the 1976 Summer Olympics.

During her career Helen held numerous national records for both Scotland and Great Britain at 100m and 200m.

== Biography ==
Helen represented Scotland at the 1970 British Commonwealth Games in Edinburgh, and one month later finished third behind Anita Neil in the 100 metres event at the 1970 WAAA Championships, the same year that she became a European Junior Champion in the 200 metres.

Helen became the British 200 metres champion after winning the British WAAA Championships title at the 1973 WAAA Championships.

After representing Scotland at the 1974 British Commonwealth Games in Christchurch, New Zealand, Helen was twice on the podium in the 100 and 200 metres events at the 1974 WAAA Championships and regained the 200 metres title at the 1975 WAAA Championships.

Helen competed for Scotland at a third Commonwealth Games in 1978 and won nine Scottish championships in the 100 and 200 metres.

She also competed in the women's 200 metres at the 1976 Montreal Summer Olympics.
