= Christina Heinich =

East German sprinter

Medal record

Women's athletics

Representing East Germany

Olympic Games
Silver medal – second place	1972 Munich	4×100 m

European Championships
Gold medal – first place	1974 Rome	4×100 m

Christina Schiffner (née Heinich; born 8 July 1949 in Leipzig) is a retired East German sprinter who specialized in the 200 metres.

At the 1972 Summer Olympics in Munich she finished fifth in the 200 metres and won silver medal in the 4 × 100 metres relay with her teammates Evelin Kaufer, Bärbel Struppert and Renate Stecher.

She participated at three European Championships. In 1966 she finished fifth in relay, and in 1971 she finished eighth in the 200 m. At the 1974 European Championships she won the relay together with teammates Bärbel Eckert, Doris Maletzki and Renate Stecher.

She competed for the club SC Leipzig during her active career, under coach Karl-Heinz Balzer and with fellow athletes like Karin Balzer and Regina Höfer. She married the cyclist Michael Schiffner.
