= Helena Fliśnik =

Polish sprinter (1952–1999)

Personal information
- Nationality: Polish
- Born: 22 January 1952 Zabrze, Poland
- Died: 1 January 1999 (aged 46) Zabrze, Poland
- Height: 1.67 m (5 ft 6 in)
- Weight: 62 kg (137 lb)

Sport
- Sport: Sprinting
- Event: 100 metres
- Club: Górnik Zabrze
Medal record
Representing Poland
Summer Universiade
Bronze medal – third place	1977 Sofia	4x100m relay

Helena Fliśnik (née Kerner; 22 January 1952 – 1 January 1999) was a Polish sprinter. She competed in the women's 4 × 100 metres relay at the 1972 Summer Olympics.

== Personal bests ==
Outdoor

- 100 meters – 11.3 (1971)
- 200 meters – 24.4
- Long jump – 6.37 m
