= Margit Nemesházi =

Hungarian sprinter

Personal information
- Nationality: Hungarian
- Born: Margit Markó; 13 October 1943 (age 82) Budapest, Hungary

Sport
- Sport: Sprinting
- Event: 100 metres

Margit Nemesházi (née Markó; born 13 October 1943) is a Hungarian sprinter. She competed in the 100 metres at the 1964 Summer Olympics and the 1968 Summer Olympics.
