= Lyudmila Maslakova =

Soviet sprinter (born 1952)

Personal information
- Born: 26 February 1952 (age 74) Astrakhan, Russian SFSR, Soviet Union
Medal record
Women's athletics
Representing the Soviet Union
Olympic Games
Silver medal – second place	1980 Moscow	4×100 m relay
Bronze medal – third place	1968 Mexico City	4×100 m relay
Bronze medal – third place	1976 Montreal	4×100 m relay
European Championships
Gold medal – first place	1978 Prague	4×100 m relay
Bronze medal – third place	1971 Helsinki	4×100 m relay
Bronze medal – third place	1978 Prague	100 m
Summer Universiade
Gold medal – first place	1970 Turin	4x100 m relay
Gold medal – first place	1973 Moscow	4x100 m relay
Gold medal – first place	1975 Rome	100 m
Gold medal – first place	1975 Rome	4x100 m relay
Gold medal – first place	1977 Sofia	4x100 m relay

Lyudmila Ilyinichna Maslakova (Russian: Людмила Ильинична Маслакова, née Жаркова, Zharkova; born 26 February 1952 in Astrakhan) is a Soviet athlete who competed mainly in the 100 metres.

== Career ==
Maslakova trained at VSS Trud in Sverdlovsk and later at Burevestnik in Moscow. She competed for the USSR in the 1968 Summer Olympics held in Mexico City, Mexico in the 4 × 100 metres where she won the bronze medal with her teammates Galina Bukharina, Vera Popkova and Lyudmila Samotyosova.

Her next Olympic medal came in the 1976 Summer Olympics held in Montreal, Quebec, Canada again in the 4 × 100 metres where she won the bronze medal with her teammates Tatyana Prorochenko, Nadezhda Besfamilnaya and Vera Anisimova.

Her third Olympic medal came 12 years after her first in the 1980 Summer Olympics held in Moscow, Soviet Union once again in the 4 × 100 metres where she improved to the silver medal with her teammates Vera Komisova, Vera Anisimova and Natalya Bochina.
