= Sylviane Telliez =

French sprinter (born 1942)

Personal information
- Nationality: France
- Born: 30 October 1942 (age 83) Epinay-sur-Seine

Sport
- Event: Sprint (running)
Medal record
Women's athletics
Representing France
European Indoor Championships
Gold medal – first place	1970 Vienna	Medley relay
Silver medal – second place	1970 Vienna	60 m
Silver medal – second place	1971 Sofia	60 m
Bronze medal – third place	1972 Grenoble	50 m
Bronze medal – third place	1973 Rotterdam	60 m

Sylviane Telliez (née Marotel; born 30 October 1942) is a former French track and field who competed in short sprints. She dominated French sprinting in the first half of the 1970s. She was a four-time medallist in the 60 metres at the European Athletics Indoor Championships from 1970 to 1974. She was also a 100 m finalist at the 1969 European Athletics Championships.

She was born in Épinay-sur-Seine and ran for Racing Club de France during her career. She was a three-time participant at the Summer Olympics for France (1968, 1972, and 1976). She broke the world record for the 300 metres in 1968 to 1969 with her hand-timed runs of 37 seconds and 36.5 seconds. She was a former holder of the European indoor record for the 50 metres with her best of 6.24 seconds. She held the French record over 100 metres for a total of eight years, including breaking the mark times in 1972 (11.01s), and the 200 metres for two years with her best of 23.08. She was also a national record holder indoors in the 50 m (6.31 seconds) and 60 metres (7.27 in 1974).

== International competitions ==
- (gold) European champion Indoors 50 m in 1968 (in Madrid )
- (gold) European champion in the relay 1 + 2 + 3 + 4 laps 1970
- (gold) European Indoors champion in the relay 4 × 200 m 1969
- (gold) Gold Medal 100 m at the Mediterranean Games in 1967
- (silver) Second in European Indoors Champion 60 m in 1969, 1970 and 1971
- (bronze) Third in European Indoors Champion 60 m in 1972 and 1973

== National titles ==
- French Athletics Championships
  - 100 m: 1968, 1969, 1970, 1971, 1972, 1973, 1974, 1975
  - 200 m: 1967, 1969, 1970, 1971, 1972, 1973
- French Indoor Athletics Championships
  - 60 m: 1972, 1973, 1975 and 1976
