= Györgyi Balogh =

Hungarian sprinter (born 1948)

Personal information
- Born: 1 May 1948 (age 78) Budapest, Hungary

Sport
- Sport: Track and field
Medal record
Representing Hungary
European Championships
Silver medal – second place	1971 Helsinki	200 metres
Summer Universiade
Silver medal – second place	1970 Turin	200 metres
Silver medal – second place	1970 Turin	4x100 metre relay
Bronze medal – third place	1970 Turin	100 metres

Györgyi Balogh (born 1 May 1948) is a Hungarian former sprinter. She placed second in women's 200 metres at the 1971 European Championships in Helsinki and competed in the Summer Olympic Games in 1968 and 1972.

== Career ==
At the 1968 Summer Olympics in Mexico City Balogh competed in the 100 metres, 200 metres and the 4 × 100 metres relay, only qualifying from the first round in the 100 metres, in which she was eliminated in the second round.

Balogh also competed in the 1969 European Championships in Athens without much more success, but two years later in Helsinki she won the silver at 200 metres, running 23.26 and losing only to East Germany's Renate Stecher. In addition, she placed fifth in both the 100 metres and the 4 × 100 metres relay.

She returned to the Olympics in 1972 Summer Olympics, this time running the 400 metres. She led the quarter-finals with a time of 51.71, which was her personal best and briefly an Olympic record. In the semi-finals she ran 51.90 and qualified for the final, in which she placed eighth and last in 52.39; her quarter-final time would have been enough.for fourth place.

Representing the Budapest club Vasas SC, Balogh won Hungarian championships in the 100 m (1968, 1971 and 1972), 200 m (1968–1972), 400 m (1971 and 1972), 4 × 100 m (1969–1972 and 1975), 4 × 200 m (1969–1971 and 1975), 4 × 400 m (1970–1972 and 1975) and 80 m hurdles (1968). As of 2014, her personal best in the 200 metres (22.8 from 1971) is still the Hungarian record.
