= Gabrielle Meyer =

French sprinter (1947–2018)

Personal information
- Nationality: France
- Born: 10 May 1947 Toulouse, Haute-Garonne, France
- Died: 18 November 2018 (aged 71)

Sport
- Event(s): 100 m, 200 m
- Club: Toulouse UC
Medal record
Representing France
Summer Universiade
Gold medal – first place	1967 Tokyo	200m
Gold medal – first place	1967 Tokyo	4x100m relay
Silver medal – second place	1967 Tokyo	100m

Gabrielle Solange Meyer (married name is Morère) (10 May 1947 – 18 November 2018) was a French athlete, who specialised in sprinting.

== Biography ==
Meyer won five champion of France (fr) titles, three in the 100 metres in 1965, 1966 and 1967, and two in the 200 metres in 1965 and 1966. In 1967, she won the gold medal in the 200m and the silver medal in the 100m during the Summer Universiade at Tokyo. In October 1967, in Mexico City, she equaled France's 200m record (fr) from Catherine Capdevielle in 23.7s. She participated in the 1968 Olympics in Mexico City. Eliminated in the quarterfinals of the 100m, she took eighth in the 4 × 100 m relay. She was selected 18 times for France.

=== Prize list ===
International Awards
Date	Competition	Location	Result	Event	Performance
1967	Summer Universiade	Tokyo	2nd	100 m	11.7s
1967	Summer Universiade	Tokyo	1st	200 m	23.8s
1968	Olympic Games	Mexico	8th	4 × 100 m Relay	44 s 2
1969	European Championships	Athens	5th	200 m	23.7s
1969	European Championships	Athens	4th	4 × 100 m Relay	44.6s

=== National ===
- French Championships in Athletics:
  - Winner of the 100m 1965, 1966 and 1967
  - Winner of 200m 1965 and 1966

== Records ==
Personal records
Event	Performance	Location	Date
100 m	11.55s		1967
200 m	23.66s		1967
