= Lyudmila Samotyosova =

Soviet sprinter

Personal information
- Born: 26 October 1939 (age 86) St. Petersburg, Soviet Union

Sport
- Sport: Track and field
Medal record
Representing Soviet Union
Olympic Games
Bronze medal – third place	1968 Mexico City	4×100 m
European Championships
Bronze medal – third place	1966 Budapest	4×100 m
European Indoor Championships
Gold medal – first place	1969 Belgrade	Medley relay
Gold medal – first place	1970 Vienna	4×200 m
Silver medal – second place	1969 Belgrade	4x195m relay

Lyudmila Ivanovna Samotyosova (Russian: Людмила Самотёсова, née Игнатьева, Ignatyeva; born 26 October 1939) is a former Soviet athlete who competed mainly in the 100 metres.

She competed for the USSR in the 1968 Summer Olympics held in Mexico City, Mexico in the 4 × 100 metres where she won the bronze medal with her teammates Lyudmila Zharkova, Galina Bukharina and Vera Popkova.
