= Graniczna (river) =

River in Pomeranian Voivodeship, Poland

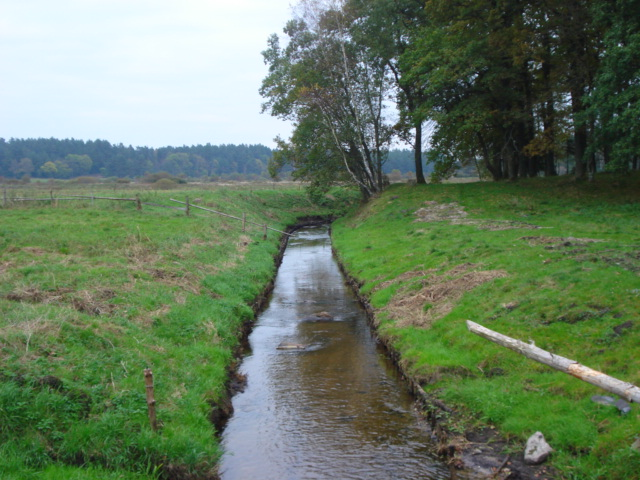
- Graniczna near Podole Małe

Location
- Country: Poland
- Region: Pomeranian Voivodeship

Physical characteristics
- Source: North of Borzęcino
  - coordinates: 54°24′57″N 17°14′49″E
  - elevation: 78 m (256 ft) above sea level
- Mouth
  - location: Southeast of Żarkowo
  - coordinates: 54°21′44″N 17°21′25″E
  - elevation: 61.2 m (201 ft) above sea level
- Length: 10.7 km (6.6 mi)

Graniczna is a river in Poland, located in Pomeranian Voivodeship, Słupsk County, and Gmina Dębnica Kaszubska, within the Polanów Upland. Stretching 10.7 km, it is a right-bank tributary of the Skotawa and lies within the buffer zone of the Słupia Valley Landscape Park. Between 2008 and 2009, the river was found to support populations of river trout, northern pike, European perch, and three-spined stickleback.

The Polish name Graniczna was officially adopted on 1 October 1948 by a decree of the Ministers of Public Administration and Recovered Territories, replacing the German names Grenzbach or Grenz Bach.

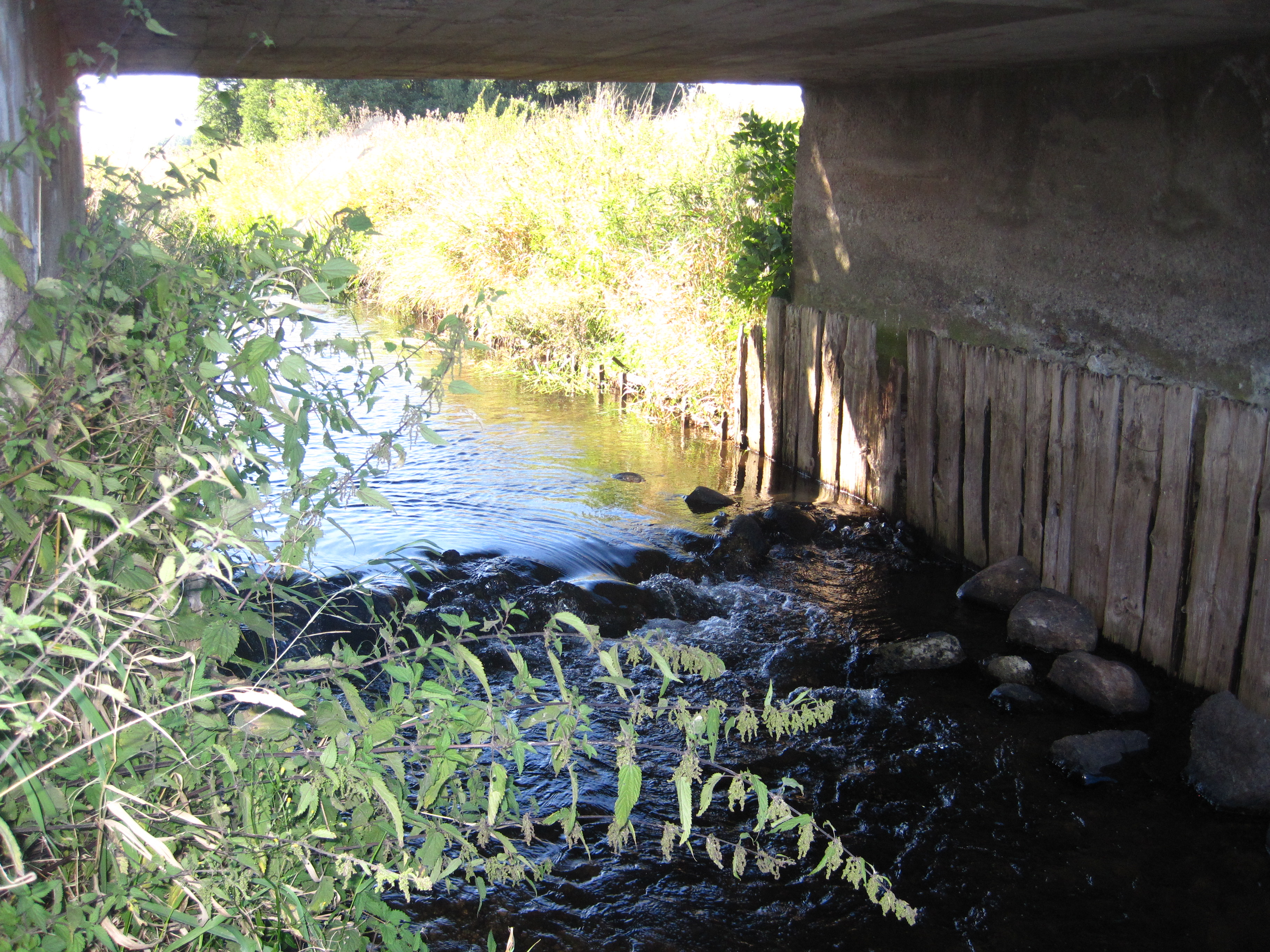
Graniczna in Żarkowo

== Location ==
Graniczna flows through Gmina Dębnica Kaszubska. It originates approximately 1 km north of the northern buildings of Borzęcino, at an elevation of about 78 m above sea level. According to land and building records, the source section lies within the Brzeziniec cadastral area. For much of its course, the river forms the boundary between cadastral areas: Brzeziniec and Łabiszewo, Łabiszewo and Dobieszewo, Dobieszewo and Podole Małe, Podole Małe and Żarkowo, Żarkowo and Dobra, Dobra and Dębnica Kaszubska Forestry, and Dębnica Kaszubska Forestry and Gogolewo. It flows into the Skotawa as a right-bank tributary, about 2 km southeast of Żarkowo's buildings, at an elevation of 61.2 m above sea level.

In Poland's physiographic regionalization, Graniczna is situated in the Polanów Upland mesoregion, part of the West Pomeranian Lake Land macroregion. This mesoregion features young glacial uplands, predominantly clayey, with undulating or flat terrain.

The stream lies within the buffer zone of the Słupia Valley Landscape Park.

== Hydrology ==
Graniczna has a length of approximately 10.7 km. In its middle course, it is about 1.5 m wide with an average depth of 0.3 m. Within Poland's classification of uniform water bodies, its drainage basin is part of a larger unit numbered RW20002347266.

== Fish species ==
Between 2008 and 2009, Graniczna was home to river trout (Salmo trutta m. fario), northern pike (Esox lucius), European perch (Perca fluviatilis), and three-spined stickleback (Gasterosteus aculeatus). The stickleback population declined significantly from 1998, with 96 individuals caught between 1998 and 1999 compared to only 15 between 2008 and 2009. River trout catches increased from 3 to 11 over the same period. The ninespine stickleback (Pungitius pungitius), observed between 2003 and 2004 with 12 individuals, was no longer present by 2008–2009. Fishing is strictly prohibited in the river, and from 1 October to 31 December, it is designated a protected area.

== Economic and environmental role ==
Graniczna receives treated wastewater from the Borzęcino treatment plant via a drainage ditch, using mechanical-biological purification methods. In 2008, the discharged water had a chemical oxygen demand of 56.0 mg/L, a five-day biochemical oxygen demand of 29.5 mg/L, and total suspended solids of 33.0 mg/L.

The stream is listed in a 17 December 2002 Council of Ministers regulation as significant for regulating water relations for agricultural purposes.

The Graniczna valley, alongside the Skotawa valley, is a key area for the rapid spread of peat in the Dębnica Kaszubska municipality. Wet meadows along the stream form one of the largest such plant communities in the region.
