= Palace Park, Podole Małe =

Park in Poland

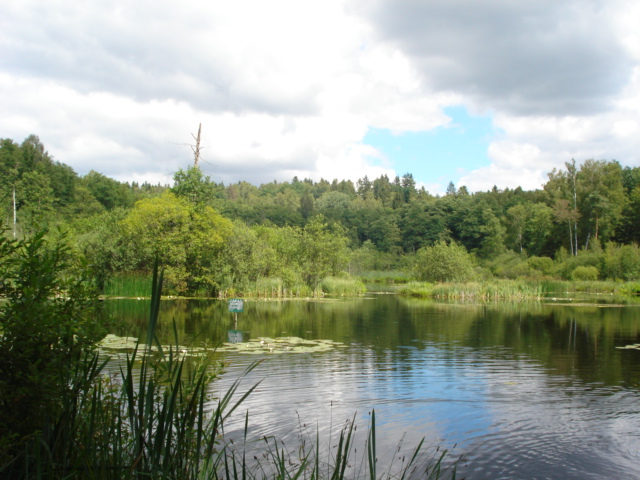
- Interactive map of Palace Park, Podole Małe
- Location: Podole Małe
- Coordinates: 54°22′57″N 17°18′18″E
- Area: 16.23 ha (40.1 acres)
- Established: second half of the 19th century

The Palace Park, Podole Małe is a palace park in the Pomeranian Voivodeship, Słupsk County, Gmina Dębnica Kaszubska, in the village of Podole Małe, covering an area of 16.23 hectares. Established in the second half of the 19th century, it was designed in a landscape style around a manor owned by the Central Pomeranian noble family von Zitzewitz. In 1997, it was entered into the register of monuments as an immovable heritage site. The tree stand is dominated by European beech and pedunculate oak. Exotic plants, such as Serbian spruce and eastern hemlock, are also abundant. The park hosts rare animal species, including the common toad, smooth newt, and Eurasian pygmy shrew. A forest pond of about 2.7 hectares within the complex serves as a natural habitat for the mute swan. The park also contains an Evangelical cemetery.

== Geography ==
=== Location ===
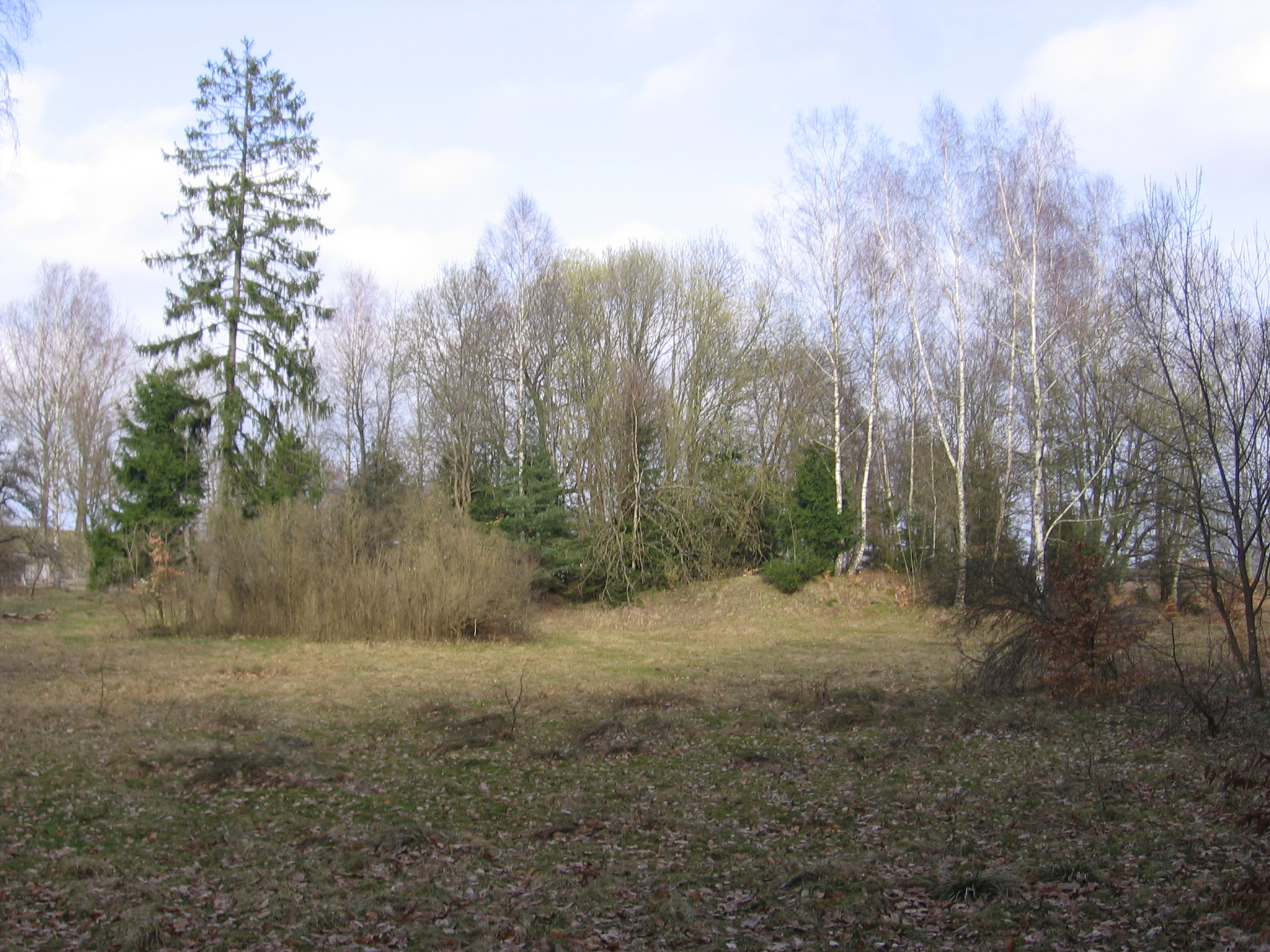
Meadow in the palace park in Podole Małe

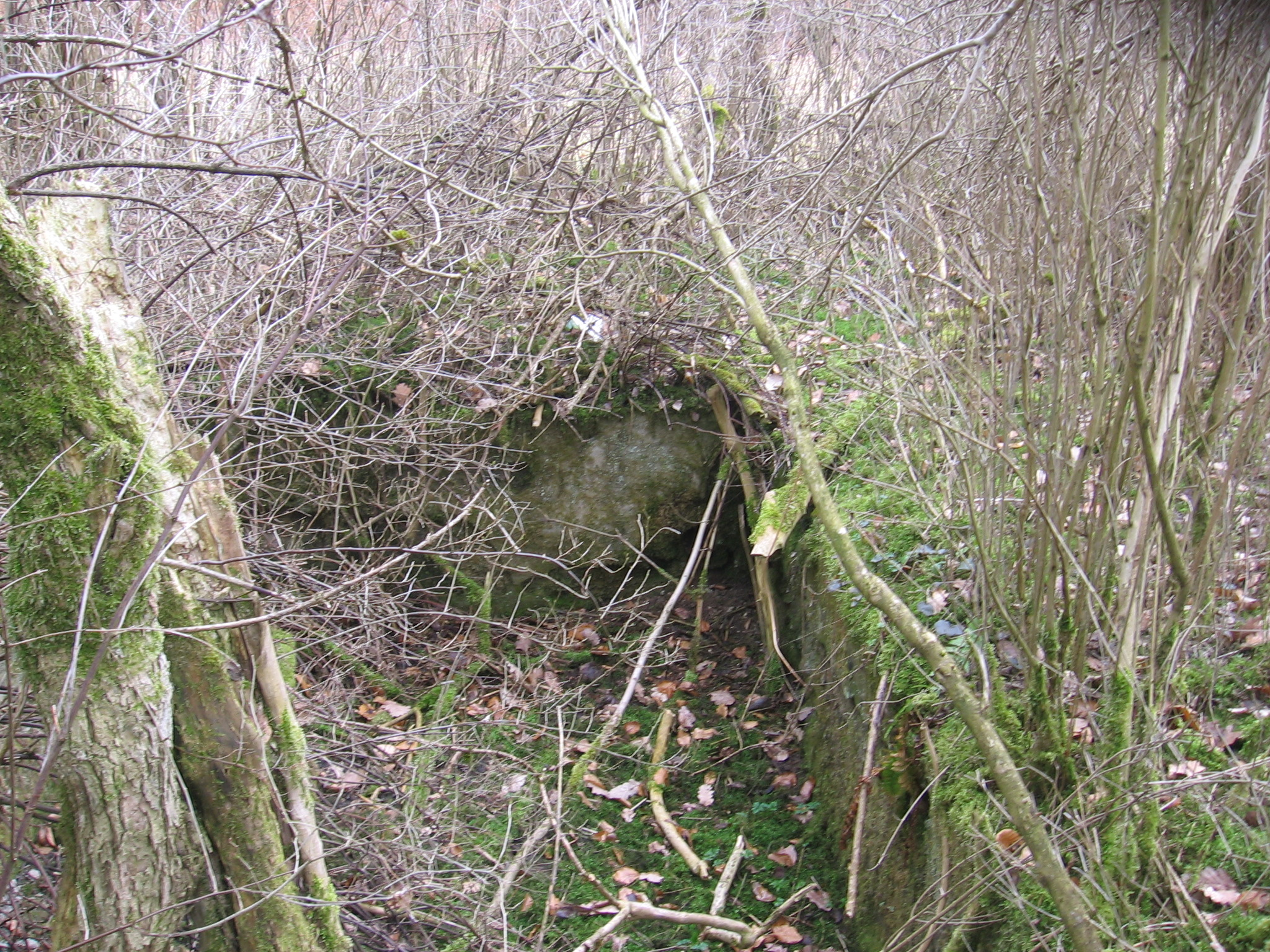
Ruins of the palace complex

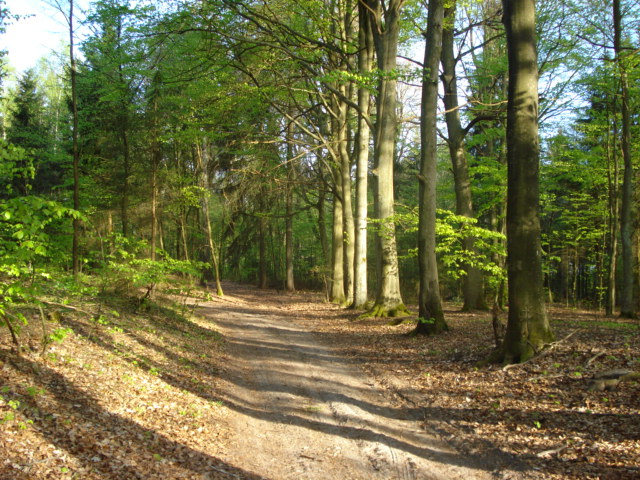
Avenue of common beeches in the park

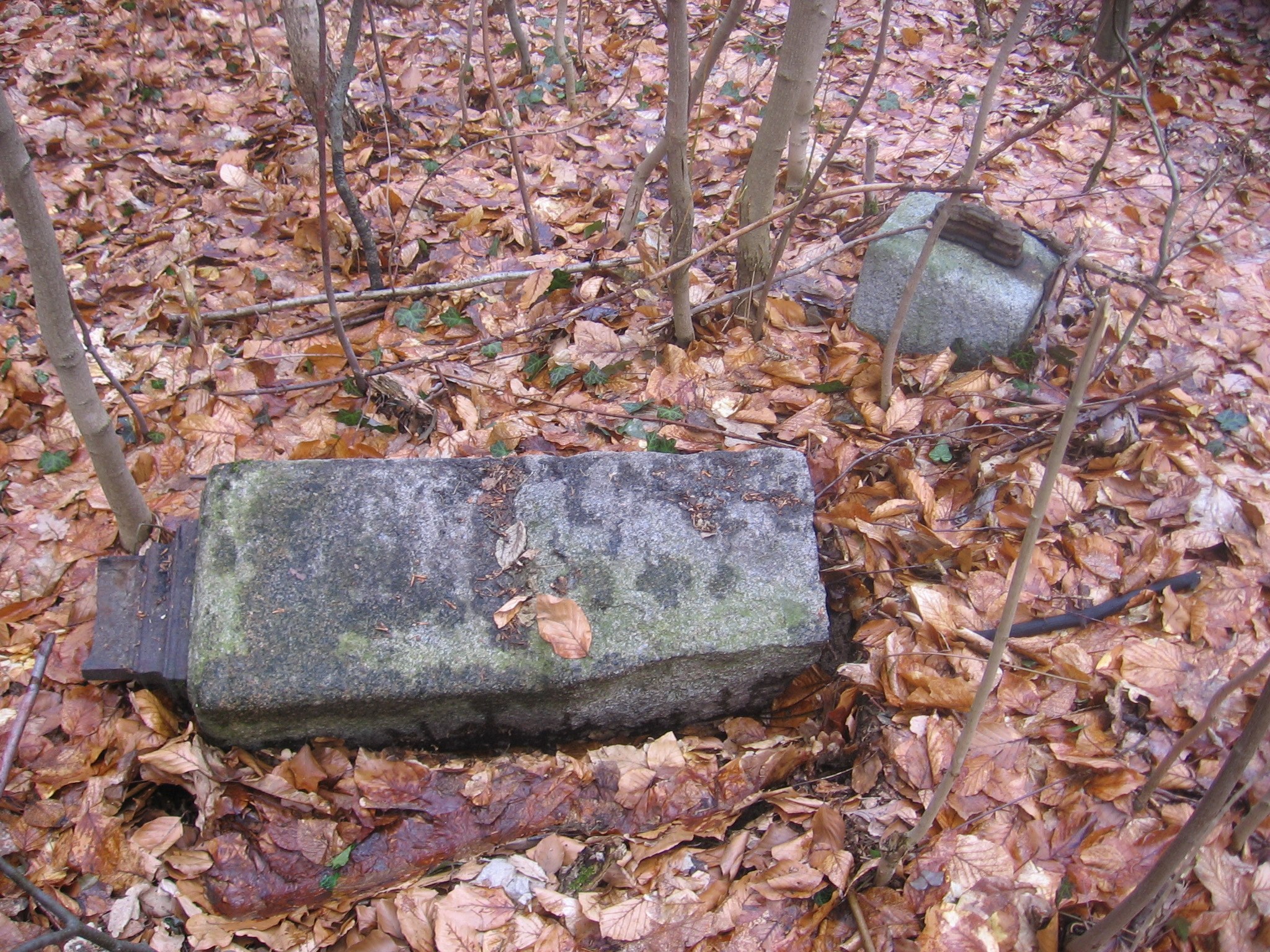
Evangelical cemetery in the palace park in Podole Małe

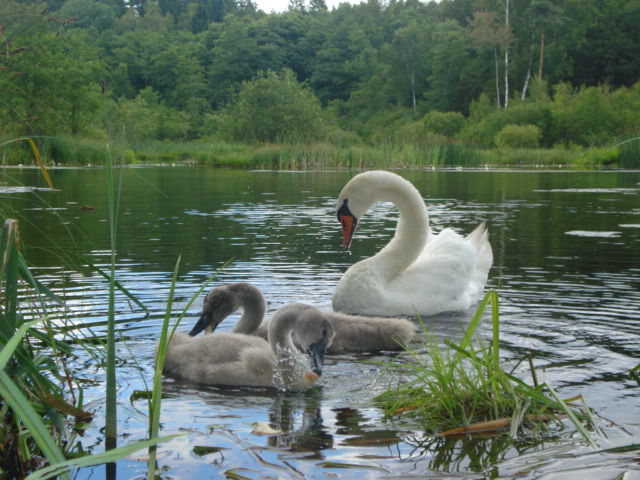
Mute swans in the park

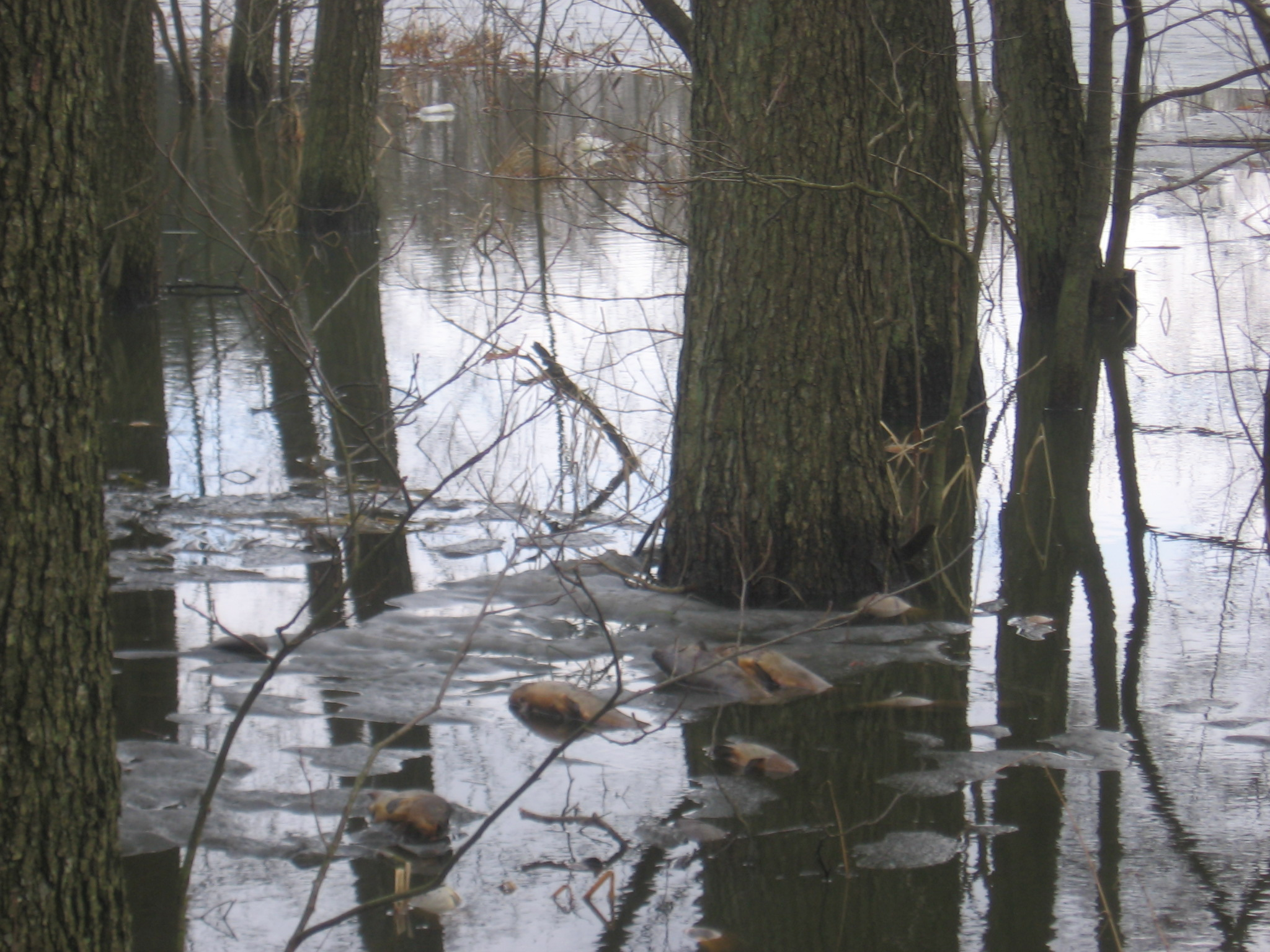
Dead fish in the pond due to suffocation under ice

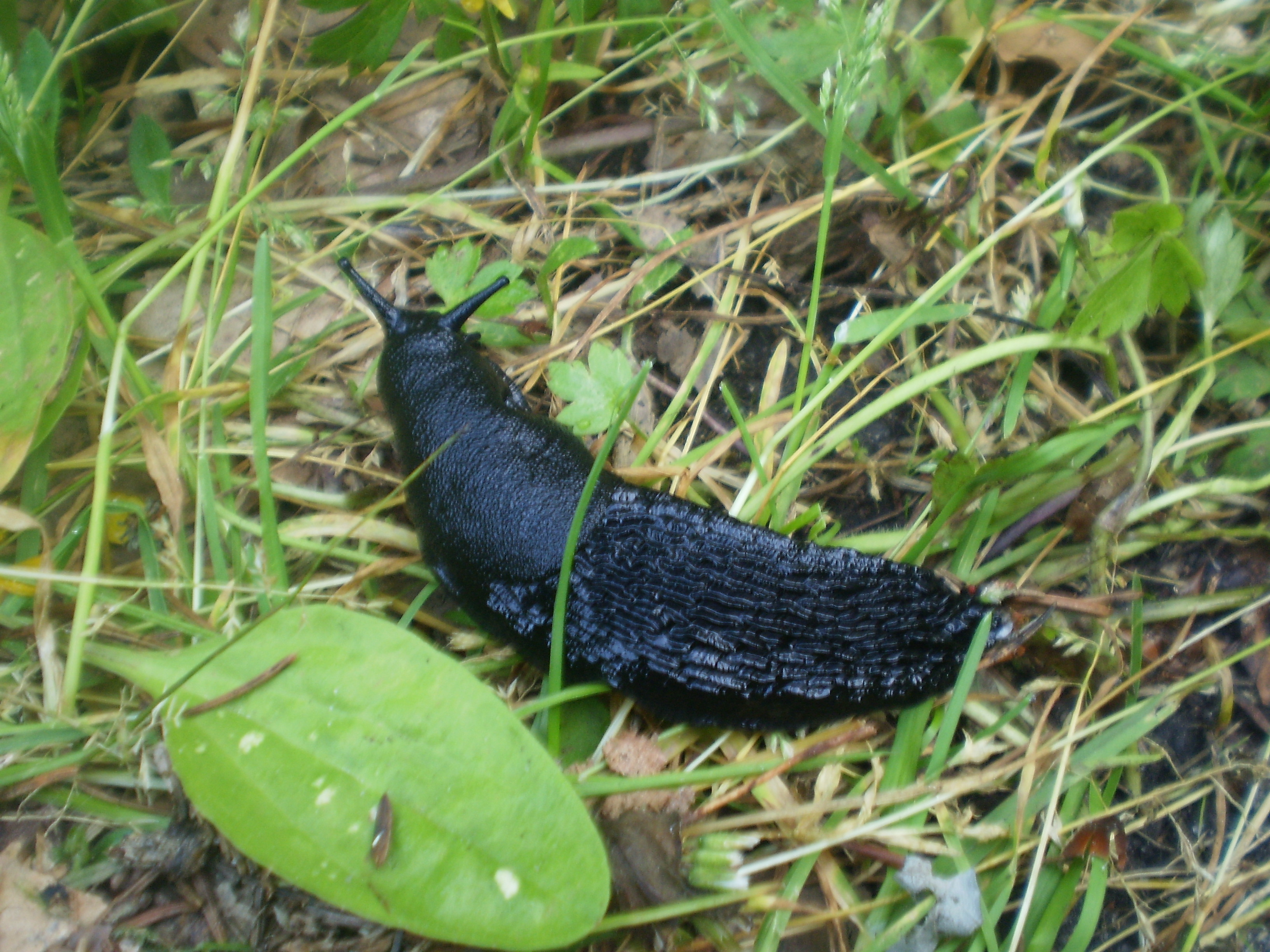
Black slug in the park

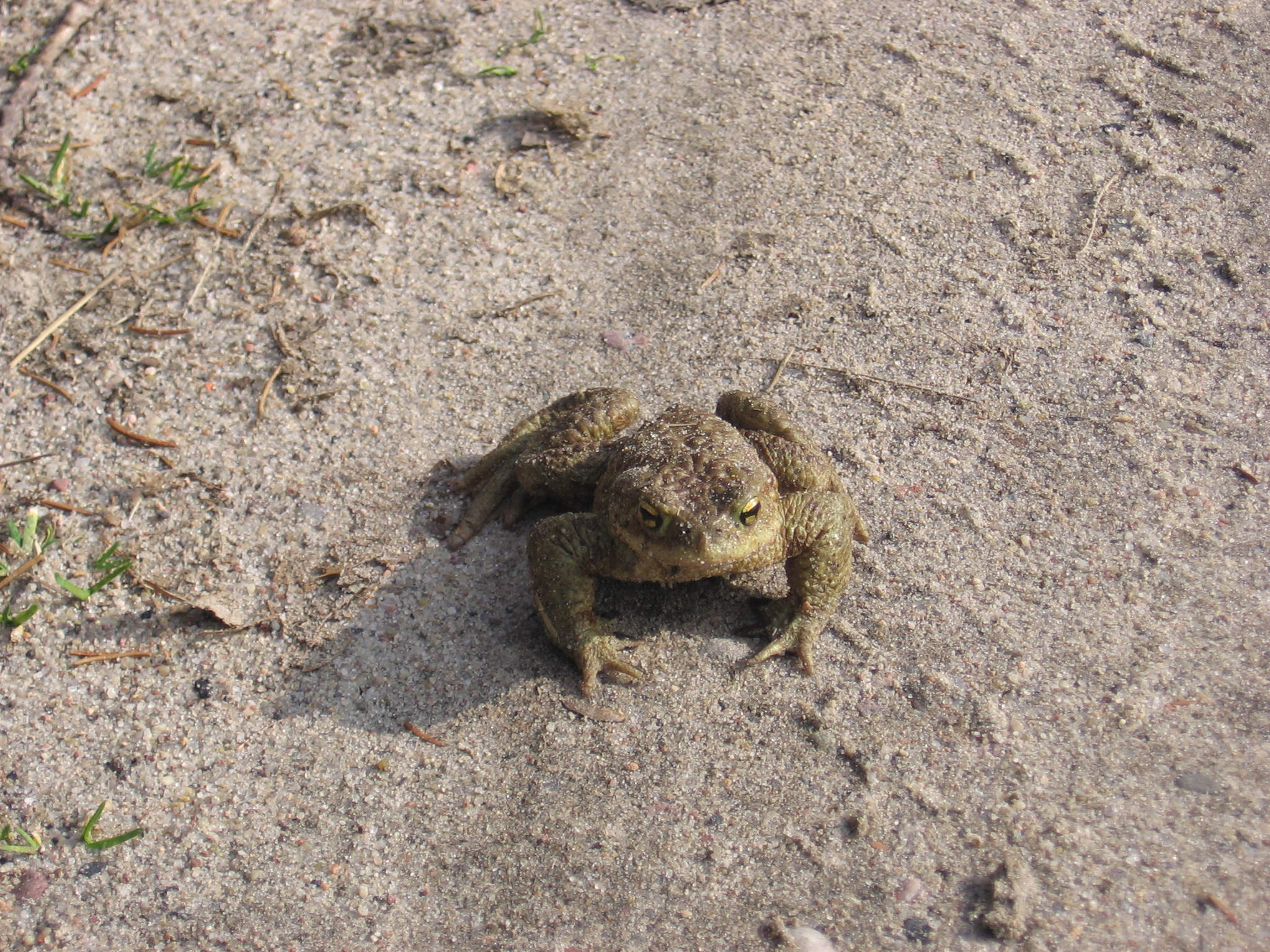
Common toad in the park

The park is located in the northern part of Gmina Dębnica Kaszubska, adjacent to Podole Małe. It lies along county road no. 1177G, connecting Głobino to Podkomorzyce, which forms its southern boundary. To the west, it is bordered by a dirt road leading to the village of Łabiszewo.

According to the physico-geographical regionalization of Poland by Jerzy Kondracki, the park lies within the megaregion of Central European Lowlands, the province of North European Plain, the subprovince of South Baltic Lakelands, the macroregion of Western Pomeranian Lakeland, and the mesoregion of Polanów Upland.

The complex is situated within the buffer zone of the Słupia Valley Landscape Park. The actual boundary of the landscape park lies about 5 km to the west. Approximately 150 meters west of the park's western boundary flows the Graniczna river, fed by a stream originating from the pond within the complex. Opposite the pond, across the county road, stands a hill, an early medieval lowland hillfort.

=== Topography ===
The park's terrain was primarily shaped during the Pleistocene through the aggradation of rock material carried by the ice sheet during the last glaciation in present-day Poland, the Weichselian glaciation. As the ice sheet retreated, small depressions formed, now appearing as kettle lakes. The water body in the park, due to rooted vegetation across its surface and artificial fish stocking, is commonly called a pond.

=== Geology ===
The park's material consists mainly of Quaternary deposits, including Pleistocene glacial and glaciofluvial sediments and Holocene deposits. Clayey sands and tills predominate.

=== Soils ===
According to Bohdan Dobrzański's map, the park lies on soils formed from clayey sands and tills, as well as weakly clayey and clayey sands of various origins. These are mostly Quaternary deposits, primarily Pleistocene and Holocene. These soils have low agricultural productivity due to significant acidification of the parent material. Per the FAO nomenclature, the park area is covered by typical Cambisols. Such soils support forest vegetation of hornbeam forests and fertile lowland beech forests. According to the agricultural soil map by Tadeusz Witek and Marian Koter, the park lies on pseudopodzolic and leached brown soils, formed on clayey sands. Compared to typical brown soils, leached brown soils require more intensive liming and fertilization but can yield similarly under favorable conditions. These soils are classified as the good rye complex for agricultural soil suitability complexes.

=== Climate ===
The park lies in a temperate climate zone, transitional between oceanic and continental. The microclimate is shaped by polar maritime and polar continental air masses. Oceanic influence minimizes temperature fluctuations. In winter, polar continental air masses cause severe frosts, while in summer, they bring heatwaves. Polar oceanic air masses cause thaws in winter and cooling in summer. Per climatic regionalization, the park is in the outer part of the Pomeranian Lakeland region.

== Layout ==
The park is on state-owned land managed by the Łupawa Forest District, covering 16.23 hectares. It is divided into 10 forest compartments within compartment 290 in the Podole Małe forestry area:

Compartment	290 g	290 h	290 o	290 p	290 r	290 s	290 t	290~a	290~b	290~c
Area [ha]	0.36	1.15	4.88	1.97	3.90	2.69	0.88	0.30	0.05	0.05

To the east, an access road borders the park, near a park meadow. Nearby are the ruins of the palace. A pond of 2.69 hectares lies in the northwestern part. The park retains a clear system of walking paths.

== History ==
The park was established in a landscape style in the second half of the 19th century around a palace owned by the von Zitzewitz family, utilizing natural topography and existing tree stand. The manor was destroyed in the 1960s. In 1996, a White Card (Inventory Card for Monuments of Architecture and Construction) was created, listing it as a palace and farm complex. On 6 May 1997, the Provincial Conservator of Monuments in Słupsk entered it into the Słupsk Voivodeship register of monuments under decision no. PSOZ-I-5340/16/97, with registration number A-353 as a palace park. After the 1999 administrative reform, it was listed under registration number A-1630 in the Provincial Office for Monument Protection in Gdańsk.

== Flora ==
The tree stand is dominated by about 140-year-old European beech and pedunculate oak, and over 100-year-old Norway spruce. 17 Norway maple trees line the access road, the largest with a 355 cm circumference, others ranging from 60 to 170 cm. About 65-year-old common alder trees grow on the pond's northern side. The tree stand includes European silver fir with natural regeneration, Douglas fir, Serbian spruce, eastern hemlock, a purple-leaved common beech variety, sycamore maple, and single specimens of birch and ash. The park meadow features mirabelle plum, apple tree, and black cherry, with a Worley's sycamore maple in its western part.

The shrub layer includes common snowberry, rugosa rose, common hazel, common hawthorn, lilac, alder buckthorn, eared willow, common sallow, red-berried elder, common broom, and bridewort. Single specimens of raspberry complement it.

The herbaceous layer features wood clubrush, yellow flag, water violet, sand sedge, crested wood fern, wood sorrel, lily of the valley, narrowleaf cattail, and windflower.

== Fauna ==
Rare and protected species in the park include the common toad, smooth newt, pool frog, edible frog, common slow worm, mute swan, European hedgehog, European mole, common shrew, Eurasian pygmy shrew, and red squirrel.

== Conservation ==
As an immovable monument in the register of monuments, under the Act of 23 July 2003 on the Protection and Care of Monuments, construction work, archaeological research, or site division requires permission from the voivodeship conservator of monuments. Public administration must ensure legal, organizational, and financial conditions for permanent preservation, management, and maintenance, preventing threats, destruction, or misuse, and monitoring its condition.

The owner, Łupawa Forest District, must ensure scientific study, documentation, construction work, security, and maintenance, allowing use that preserves its value and promoting knowledge about the park.

Its location in the buffer zone of the landscape park provides additional protection under the Regulation No. 5/2003 of the Pomeranian Voivode of 23 June 2003 on the Protection Plan for the Słupia Valley Landscape Park.

Minimal understory indicates regular maintenance.

== Evangelical cemetery ==
In the southern part, 150 meters west of the village along the Głobino–Podkomorzyce road, lies a former German Evangelical cemetery. Only a few granite gravestone fragments remain, damaged in the 1980s and 1990s by stonemasons and scrap collectors. Its boundaries are unclear.
