= West Pomeranian Lakeland =

Northern part of the South Baltic Lakelands in Poland

The West Pomeranian Lakeland (Polish: Pojezierze Zachodniopomorskie) is the northern part of the South Baltic Lakelands, characterized by its lake-rich landscape. Covering an area of 9,700 km², it accounts for approximately 3.1% of Poland's administrative territory. The region features a series of terminal moraines formed during the Pomeranian phase of the Weichselian glaciation, with Siemierzycka Góra in the Bytów Lakeland as its highest point at 256.5 m above sea level. Soils in the macroregion primarily developed from glacial deposits – clays, sands, gravels, and silt from meltwater. Predominant soil types include brown earth, podzolic soils, and podzols, with hydric soils characteristic of the region. The area boasts a well-developed river network, including major coastal rivers such as the Rega, Parsęta, and Słupia, and the sandur plains of the South Pomeranian Lakeland with rivers like the Brda, Drawa, and Gwda. The region has a high lake density, exceeding 10% in some mesoregions. The largest lake, Drawsko Lake, a multi-channel lake, spans 19.6 km² with a maximum depth of 79.7 m. Most lakes in the lakeland are classified as eutrophic based on their trophic state. The macroregion is underlain by substantial groundwater reserves, while soil water is of marginal importance due to its limited volume and poor quality. The climate is strongly influenced by the Baltic Sea, resulting in milder winters and cooler summers compared to most of Poland. According to Poland's climatic regionalization, the West Pomeranian Lakeland encompasses three climatic zones: the West Pomeranian Region in the west, the Central Pomeranian Region in the center, and the East Pomeranian Region in the east.

The flora is dominated by Central European vascular plants. Forest habitats include fresh mixed forest, fresh mixed coniferous forest, and fresh forest. Fertile beech forest and mixed coniferous forests are prominent in terms of potential natural vegetation. Some plant species in the region are glacial relicts from the Ice Age. The fauna is primarily composed of species typical of the North European Plain, with a migratory character.

== Location ==
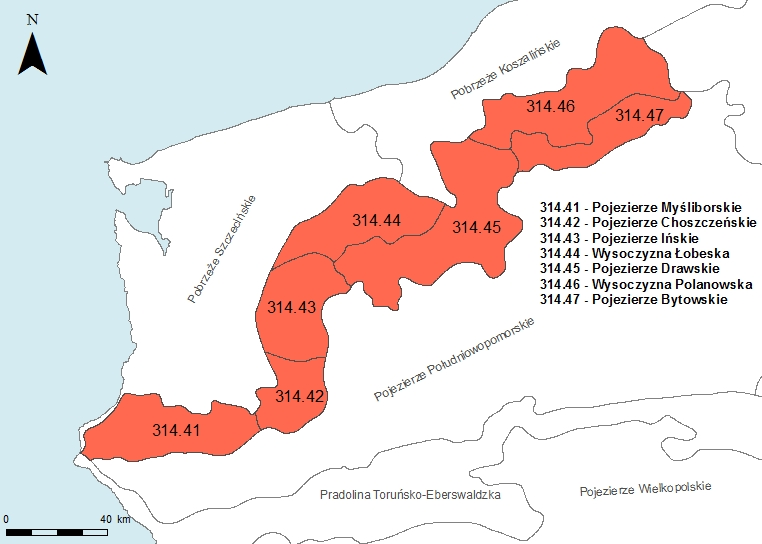
Division of the West Pomeranian Lakelandinto mesoregions

According to Jerzy Kondracki's physico-geographical regionalization of Poland, the West Pomeranian Lakeland forms the northern part of the South Baltic Lakelands subprovince (314–316). It features a series of terminal moraines from the Pomeranian phase of the Weichselian glaciation.

The macroregion is separated from the sea by the Szczecin Coast (313.2/3) and Koszalin Coast (313.4). It borders the East Pomeranian Lakeland (314.5) to the east, the South Pomeranian Lakeland (314.6/7) to the south, the Lower Oder Valley (313.24) to the west, and briefly the Toruń-Eberswalde Urstromtal (315.3).

Spanning 9,700 km², it constitutes about 3.1% of Poland's administrative area and 12.6% of the subprovince. The macroregion is divided into seven mesoregions: Myślibórz Lakeland, Choszczno Lakeland, Ińsko Lake Land, Łobez Upland, Drawsko Lakeland, Polanów Upland, and Bytów Lakeland. Administratively, it lies within the West Pomeranian Voivodeship and Pomeranian Voivodeship.

== Geological structure and landforms ==
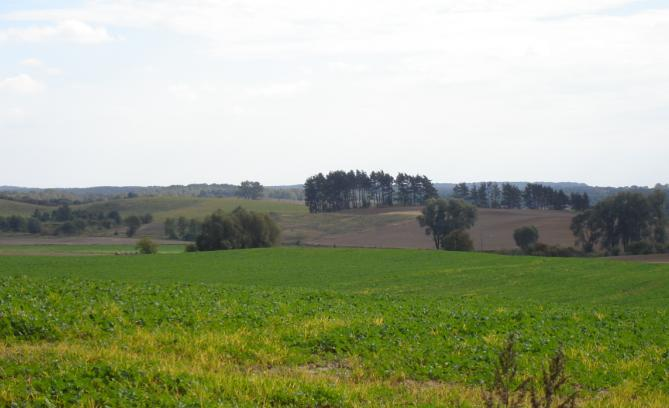
Landscape of the Choszczno Lakeland

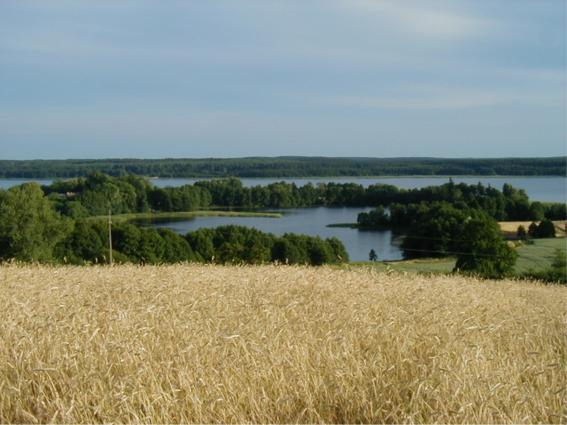
Landscape of the Drawsko Lakeland near Lubieszewo

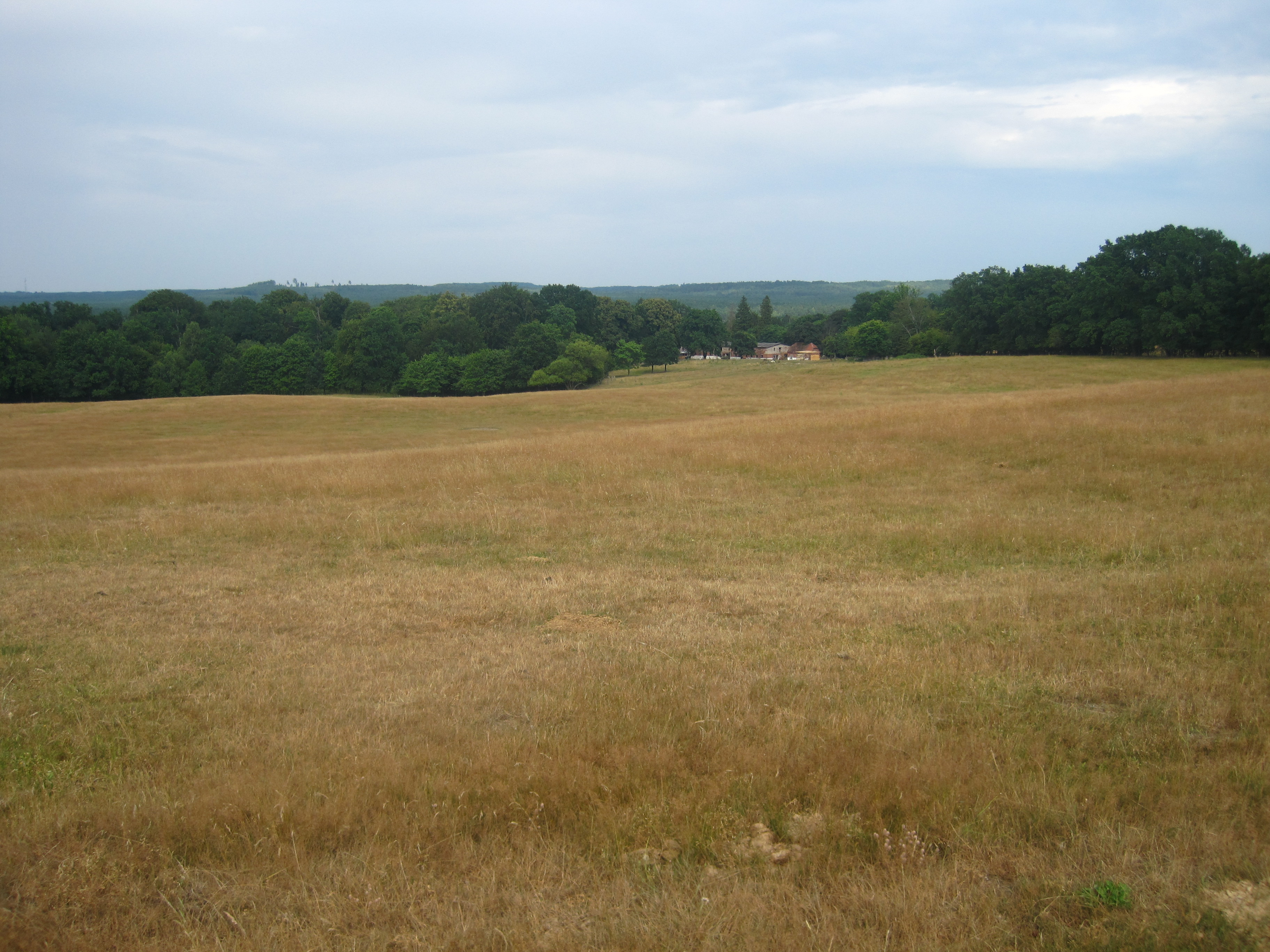
Landscape of the Polanów Upland near Krzynia

The West Pomeranian Lakeland is geomorphologically distinct from other Pomeranian lakelands within the South Baltic Lakelands subprovince, though all share a lake-rich landscape. The primary landforms are linked to the retreat of the last glaciation during the Pomeranian phase. As the ice sheet retreated, it deposited northern-origin materials – gravels, sands, clays, and boulders. During the Pomeranian stage, around 10,000–12,000 years ago at the end of the Pleistocene, a series of terminal moraines formed, distinguishing the West Pomeranian Lakeland among the subprovince's macroregions. Multiple ice margin lines are evident in some areas, such as the Myślibórz, Chojna, and Mielęcin lines in the Myślibórz Lakeland.

The terminal moraine belt varies in thickness, exceeding 200 m in the Bytów Lakeland. These moraines consist of stony till. In the western part, from the Myślibórz to Drawsko lakeland, the material is rich in calcium compounds, while in the eastern Bytów Lakeland, calcium content is low, significantly influencing ecological and lake diversity.

The moraine belt stretches linearly from southwest to northeast, roughly parallel to the Baltic Sea coastline. In the west, the layout is latitudinal in the Myślibórz Lakeland and meridional in the Choszczno Lakeland. Elevations increase northeastward. Western elevations range from 100 to 150 m above sea level, with Zwierzyniec (166.8 m) in the Myślibórz Lakeland and Głowacz (179.7 m) in the Ińsko Lakeland as high points. In the central Drawsko Lakeland, Wola Góra reaches 219.2 m, while Siemierzycka Góra (256.5 m) in the Bytów Lakeland is the highest.

Other marginal zone features from the Pomeranian phase include two arcs of elevations encircling the Bay of Pomerania and Gdańsk Bay depressions. All mesoregions are classified as young glacial uplands, typically with lakes.

During the ongoing Holocene, initial landforms have undergone significant changes due to climate shifts and vegetation development. Lakes formed where ice blocks melted, and a new hydrographic network emerged. Denudation processes have softened and lowered Pleistocene landforms, while eroded material contributed to alluvial and deluvial processes. Human activity also shapes the original landscape.

== Soils ==
Soils in the West Pomeranian Lakeland primarily formed from glacial deposits – clays, sands, gravels, and meltwater silt. In river valleys, parent material consists mainly of Holocene deposits – alluvium, peat, and gyttja. This diversity results in varied physical and chemical soil properties. Brown earth, podzolic soils, and podzols dominate, with hydric soils – formed under high moisture with bog vegetation – being characteristic.

Brown earth, typically formed from till, occur in deciduous forest habitats with near-neutral soil pH. They have good biochemical properties and are classified as II and III soil quality class. Podzolic soils form from decalcified till under acidic to slightly acidic conditions, offering favorable water-air conditions and ranking as III and IV class. Podzols develop from loose and weakly loamy sands, classified as IV and V class.

== Hydrology ==
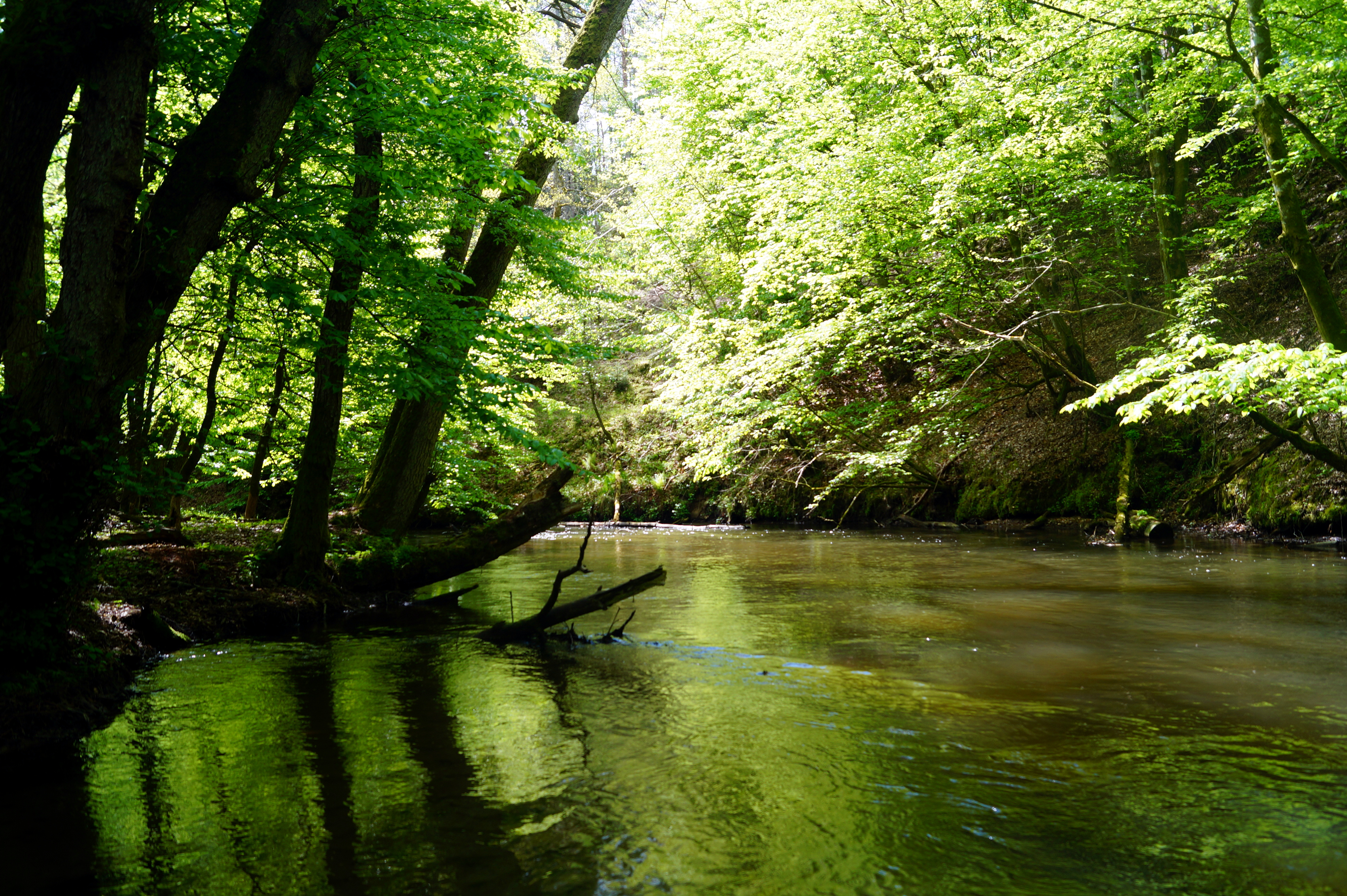
Słupia river flowing through the Polanów Upland

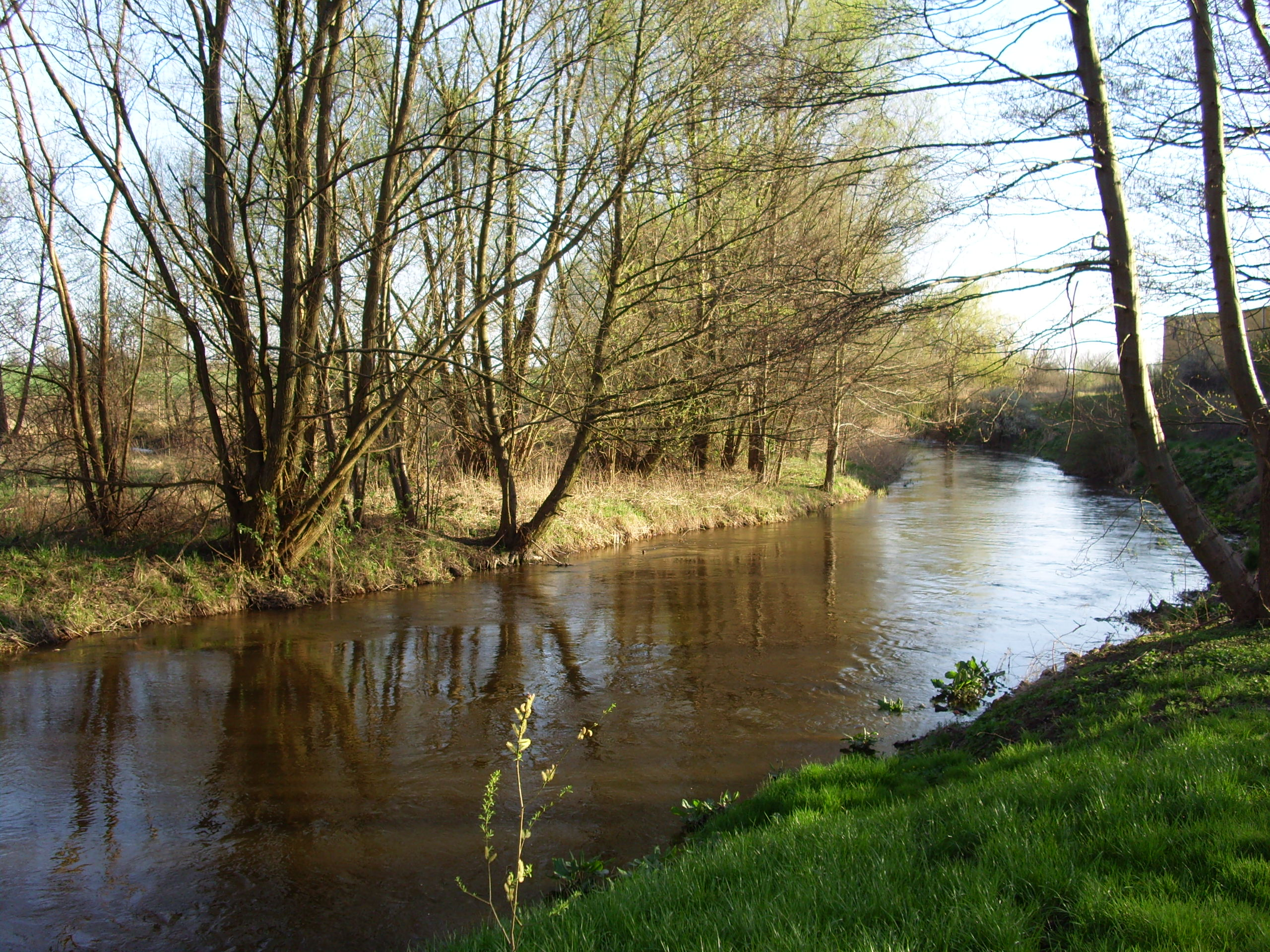
Drawa river near Drawsko Pomorskie

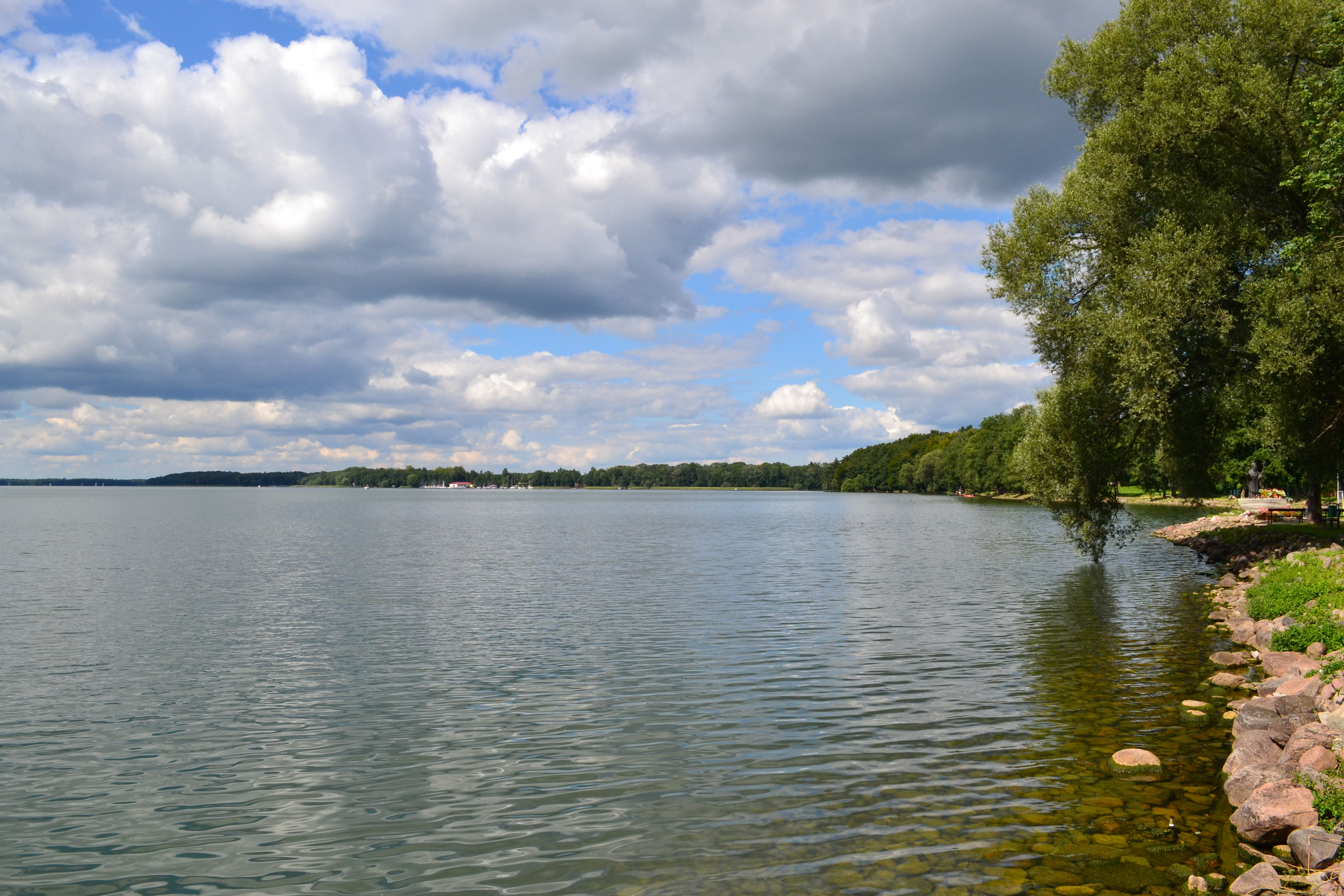
Drawsko Lake in the Drawsko Lakeland

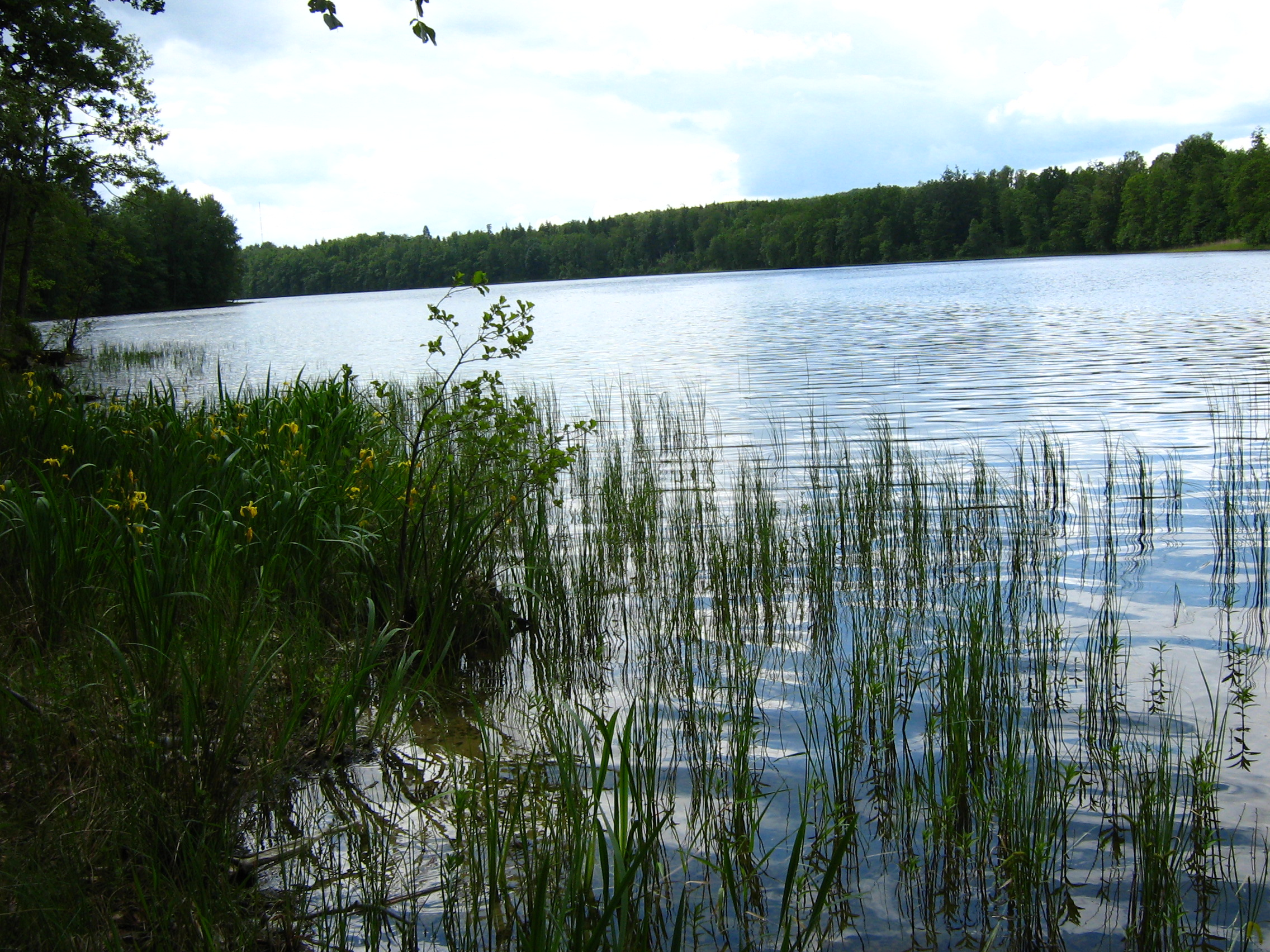
Bobięcińskie Wielkie Lake in the Bytów Lakeland

=== River network ===
The West Pomeranian Lake L\and has a dense river network closely tied to its glacial landscape. The terminal moraine belt serves as a watershed. Northward, rivers flow toward the Baltic Sea or the lower Oder river, while southward rivers drain toward the Toruń-Eberswalde Urstromtal. Major rivers flowing directly to the Baltic include the Rega (168 km), Słupia (139 km), and Parsęta (127 km), with steep gradients, especially in upper reaches, up to 5‰. Southern rivers, with short headwater sections, include the Brda (238 km), Gwda (145 km), and Drawa (186 km). The Drawa flows through Drawsko and Lubie Lakes in the Drawsko Lakeland, while the Gwda and Brda originate in the Bytów Lakeland.

=== Lakes ===
The region's high lake density is a legacy of the Weichselian glaciation. In the Drawsko, Ińsko, and western Bytów Lakelands, lakes cover over 10% of the surface. Most are ribbon or kettle types. The largest include Drawsko (a multi-ribbon lake, 17.8 km², 79.7 m deep), Wielimie (a moraine-dammed lake, 18.6 km², 5.5 m deep), and Lubie (a ribbon lake, 14.7 km², 46.2 m deep) in the Drawsko Lakeland. The Myślibórz Lakeland has around 200 lakes over 1 ha, with Myśliborskie Lake (6 km², ~22 m deep) as the largest. The Choszczno Lakeland has fewer, mostly channel lakes, led by Pełcz Lake (2.7 km², 31 m deep). The Ińsko Laakeland has significant lake coverage, with Woświn Lake (8 km², 28 m deep) as the largest. The Łobez Upland has small, less numerous lakes. The Polanów Upland has few lakes, mostly in its eastern part, with Jasień Lake (5.8 km², 32 m deep) as the largest. The Bytów Lakeland has many small lakes, often kettle lakes in various stages of peat formation, with Bobięcińskie Wielkie Lake (5 km², 48 m deep) as the largest and deepest lobelia lake in Poland.

In terms of trophic status, most lakes in the macroregion are classified as eutrophic. They are characterized by a high concentration of nutrients dissolved in the water and abundant vegetation. Agriculture has played a fundamental role in this process. In many areas, the transformation of the original forest landscape into an agricultural one contributed to the disruption of water relations by reducing the soil's retention capacity and facilitating surface runoff. This, in turn, led to a significant influx of nutrients into surface waters. In the Drawsko and Bytów lake lands, oligotrophic lakes are commonly found. These are characterized by low nutrient levels and good oxygen conditions, and they are generally deep lakes. Among oligotrophic lakes, one can distinguish between non-calcareous (lobelian) lakes – typical of the eastern part of the macroregion, where the morainic material lacks calcium compounds – and calcareous lakes, characteristic of the western part of the lakeland, where the morainic material contains large amounts of calcium compounds. Calcareous oligotrophic lakes occur most frequently in the Myślibórz Lakeland, while non-calcareous ones are most common in the Bytów Lakeland (the highest concentration in Poland). In the eastern part of the West Pomeranian Lakeland, dystrophic lakes are also well represented. These lakes have acidic, brown-colored waters due to humic substances.

=== Groundwater ===
The macroregion has substantial groundwater reserves, with depth determined by substrate structure and terrain. In lakelands, groundwater is found as shallow as 10 m, deeper in uplands. It supports the river network and is used economically due to its purity. Groundwater outflows as small lakes or springs are common in the moraine belt, fostering spring fen formation. Soil water is less significant due to low volume and poor quality.

=== Water quality ===
Four reference lakes – Jasień Południowy, Jasień Północny, Morzycko, and Wielkie Dąbie Lake – monitor surface water trends. In 2012, all had good chemical status of waters. However, their ecological status of waters varied, generally moderate, with Morzycko occasionally poor and both Jasień lakes declining from very good to good or moderate between 2010 and 2013. In the early 1980s, both Jasień lakes failed water quality classes in Poland due to excessive copper levels. Morzycko, assessed in the mid-1970s and late 1990s, was rated Class II despite some parameter exceedances.

== Climate ==
The climate is heavily influenced by the Baltic Sea, leading to milder winters and cooler summers than most of Poland. Variations within the macroregion are tied to hypsometry. Annual temperatures decrease eastward with rising elevation. Precipitation distribution depends on terrain and proximity to moisture-laden northwest oceanic air. The northern moraine slopes receive higher rainfall than the southern side. The region has high relative humidity, averaging 81% annually, with prevailing westerly winds.

Per Alojzy Woś's climatic regionalization, the West Pomeranian Lakeland includes three zones: West Pomeranian, Central Pomeranian, and East Pomeranian. The West Pomeranian Region has frequent frost days with moderate cold (daily average 0.0 °C to -5.0 °C, max above 0 °C, min at or below 0 °C) and low cloud cover (≤20%), surpassed only by the Carpathian Mountains. It sees fewer days (10 annually) of frost with high cloud cover (≥80%) and precipitation (≥0.1 mm). Moderately frosty days (daily average 0.0 °C to -5.0 °C, both max and min at or below 0 °C) are rare (7 annually). The Central Pomeranian Region has more days of moderately warm weather (daily average 5.1 °C to 15.0 °C, both max and min above 0 °C) with high cloud cover (50 days annually) and cool, rainy weather (daily average 0.1 °C to 5.0 °C, 26 days annually). The East Pomeranian Region has the highest national count of very cool frost days (daily average 0.1 °C to 5.0 °C, max above 0 °C, min at or below 0 °C) with high cloud cover and moderately frosty, cloudy days (21–79% cloud cover) with precipitation, but few very warm, rainy days (daily average 15.1 °C to 25.0 °C).

== Flora ==
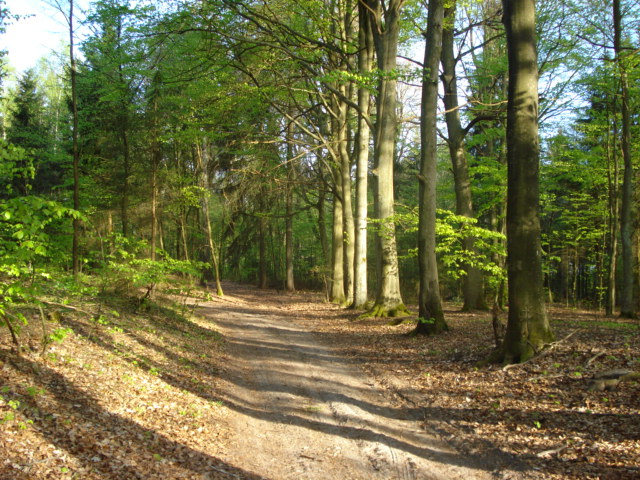
Row of common beeches in the Polanów Upland

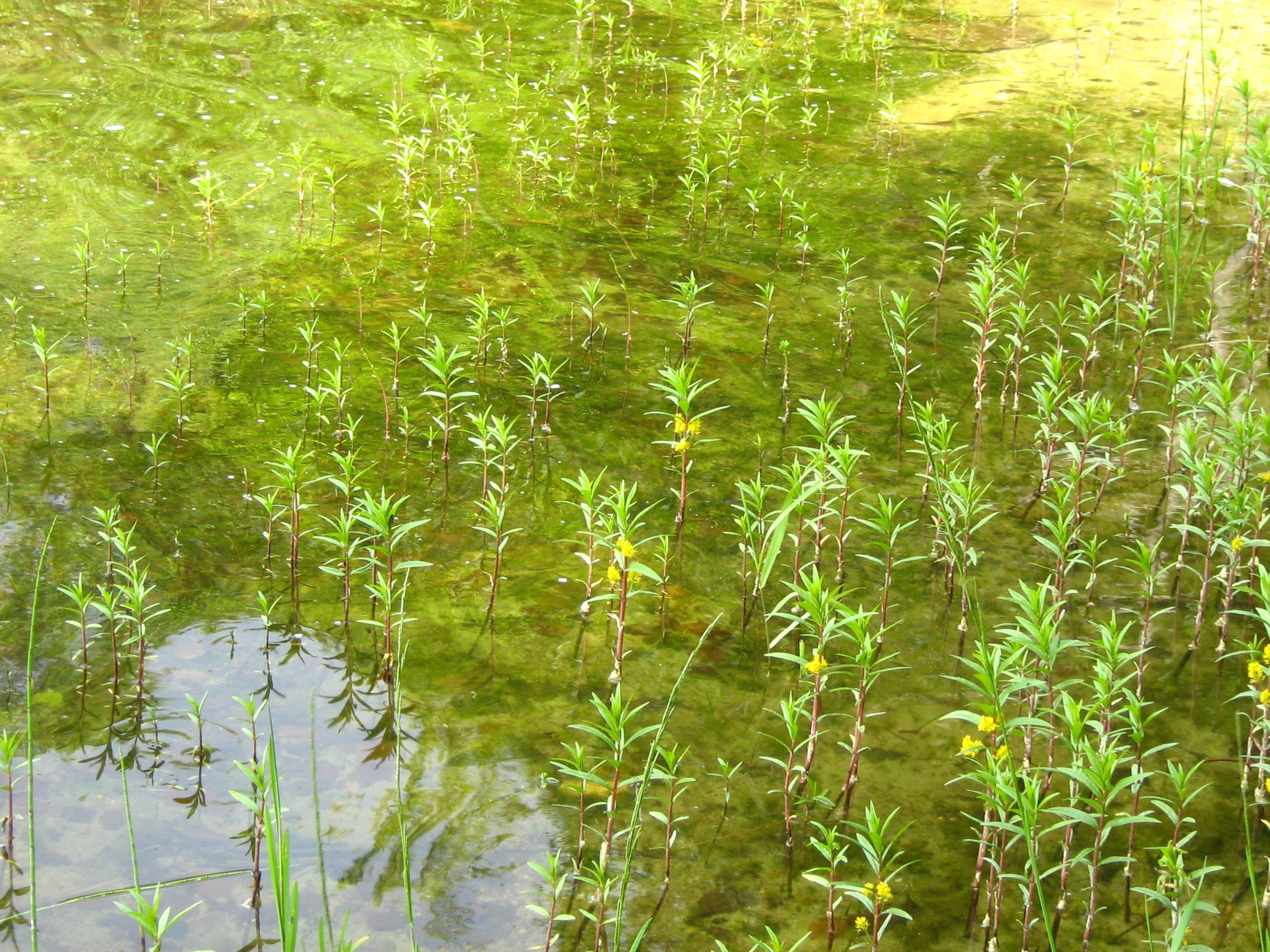
Tufted loosestrife in Bobięcińskie Wielkie Lake

=== Overview ===
Vegetation began recovering post-glaciation with treeless tundra and shrubs. As the Pleistocene ended, warming allowed trees like downy birch and steppe vegetation to develop. The preboreal Holocene saw pine-birch forests, later joined by elm, alder, and ash. The warm, humid boreal period added hazel, followed by linden and oak. Oak forests, alder carr, and riparian forest thrived in the Atlantic period. The drier subboreal period saw beech expansion and reduced elm and linden. The modern forest landscape was shaped by cooling and moistening in the subatlantic period, alongside settlement and widespread deforestation. Some plants are Ice Age glacial relicts, thriving in peatlands like bogs and swamp forests, including Dicranum undulatum, Carex heleonastes, creeping sedge, alpine bulrush, Chamaedaphne calyculata, crowberry, Vaccinium microcarpum, and moss-sedge communities in acidic fens with fleshy starwort, Jacob's-ladder and shrubby birch. Peat lakes preserve floating bur-reed and least water-lily.

=== Forest habitat types ===
Per Poland's natural-forest regionalization, the West Pomeranian Lakeland lies within the Baltic Region, aligning with the Pomeranian phase's extent. Dominant forest habitats are fresh mixed forest, fresh mixed coniferous forest, and fresh forest. The southwest favors fresh mixed and fresh forests, while the northeast has more fresh and mixed coniferous forests. The Bytów Lakeland has one of Poland's highest shares of swamp mixed coniferous forest in State Forests land, and the Drawsko Lakeland has a high share of swamp mixed forest compared to western Poland.

=== Forest communities ===
Potential natural vegetation is dominated by fertile beech forest, especially in the Myślibórz, Ińsko, and Choszczno lakelands, and mixed coniferous forests in the Drawsko Lakeland and Łobez Upland. The Polanów Upland and Bytów Lakeland have no dominant community, featuring acidic beech forest, fertile beech forests, and mixed and pine forests.

=== Vascular plants ===
Central European vascular plants dominate, including forest-forming trees like European hornbeam, pedunculate oak, sessile oak, Norway maple, ash, and European beech, and groundcover plants like wood anemone and dog's mercury. Outside forests, cowslip grows on dry, sandy soils, marsh pennywort on meadows, and white waterlily in waters. The Myślibórz Lakeland has calcium-loving flora on lake chalk deposits, with chalk peatlands among Poland's main northwestern sites. Arctic-alpine and boreal elements, like white adder's mouth, common butterwort, great horsetail, Valeriana sambucifolia, and wild garlic, are common in the Bytów and Drawsko lakelands. Oceanic species include cross-leaved heath, swamp sawgrass, brown beaksedge, blunt-flowered rush, and Groenlandia densa.

== Fauna ==
=== Overview ===
The fauna is migratory, shaped by post-glacial settlement, primarily consisting of North European Plain species, supplemented by western and eastern European, Atlantic, and rare southern and northern species. The region is zoogeographically transitional, evidenced by the presence of common nightingale (western) and thrush nightingale (eastern). Invasive species like the spinycheek crayfish negatively impact native European crayfish populations.

=== Fish ===
All lake fishery types per the Inland Fisheries Institute are present: vendace, bream, zander, tench-pike, and crucian carp lakes. Vendace lakes, typically deep with high clarity and oxygen, include species like vendace, lavaret, European smelt, common bleak, common bream, common roach, European perch, white bream, Eurasian ruffe, and northern pike. Examples include Drawsko Lake and Ińsko Lake. Bream lakes, up to 20 m deep with limited clarity and abundant underwater vegetation, feature bream, pike, perch, tench, European eel, roach, common rudd, and crucian carp, like Krzemień Lake in the Ińsko Lakeland. Zander lakes, shallow with low clarity, include zander, bream, eel, perch, tench, pike, roach, and ruffe. Tench-pike lakes, shallow and vegetated, host tench, pike, roach, crucian carp, and rarely common carp. Crucian carp lakes are dominated by crucian carp. Valuable species include Atlantic salmon and sea trout. Salmon, once abundant in the Drawa and coastal rivers, is now reintroduced, with the last spawners noted in the Drawa in 1985. Sea trout in the Słupia river show distinct genetic traits, disrupted by improper stocking.

=== Amphibians ===
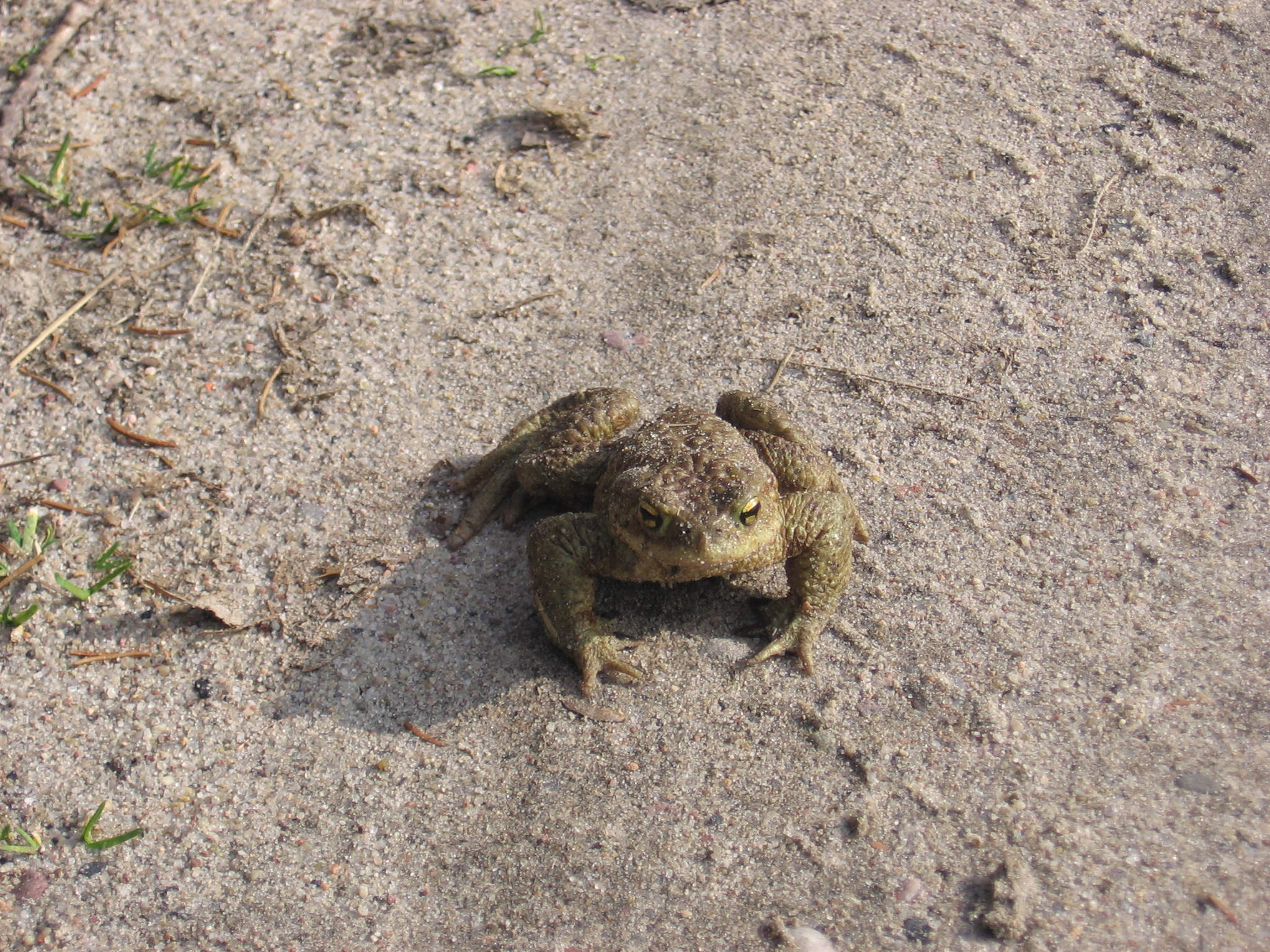
Common toad in the palace park in Podole Małe on the Polanów Upland

Common amphibians include green frogs – edible frog, pool frog, marsh frog – and brown frogs – moor frog and common frog. True toads – common toad, European green toad, and the rarer natterjack toad – are also prevalent. Unique species include the steppe relict common spadefoot, European fire-bellied toad, and European tree frog, which lives in trees outside breeding. Smooth newt and northern crested newt are also present. Seven species – natterjack toad, European green toad, European fire-bellied toad, common spadefoot, European tree frog, moor frog, and smooth newt – are under strict protection in Poland; others have partial protection.

=== Reptiles ===
Reptiles are few, including adder, grass snake, common slow worm, sand lizard, and viviparous lizard. The European pond turtle has been reported near Recz, Choszczno, and Myślibórz. The invasive pond slider is noted east of Szczecinek. The European pond turtle is strictly protected; others have partial protection.

=== Birds ===
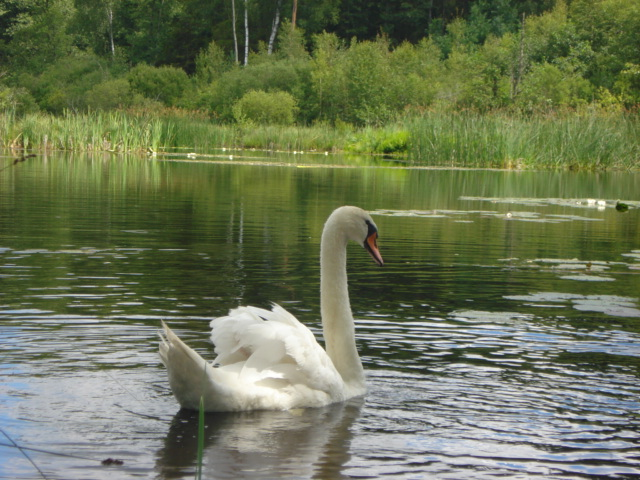
Mute swan in Podole Małe Palace Park in the Polanów Upland

The region's diverse habitats support numerous bird species, especially in wetlands, hosting mallard, Eurasian teal, common pochard, mute swan, and black-headed gull. Others include common tern, great cormorant, grey heron, common gull, black tern, and common crane. Reedbeds shelter the Eurasian bittern (notably abundant in the west), common reed warbler, water rail, and savi's warbler. Sedge and grassy wetlands host common snipe and corn crake, frequented by white stork. In the 1980s, hen harrier pairs nested near Niezabyszewo and between Mielno and Bytów, a declining species. Dry meadows and fields host Eurasian skylark, yellowhammer, and crested lark. Deciduous forests support Eurasian jay, Eurasian chaffinch, European greenfinch, wood warbler, and lesser spotted woodpecker. Forest edges near open areas suit the near-threatened red kite, abundant in Western Pomerania. Coniferous and mixed forests host goldcrest, coal tit, woodlark, and European nightjar, with lesser spotted eagle breeding near wetlands, especially in the Myślibórz and Drawsko lakelands. The white-tailed eagle is numerous in the Myślibórz Lakeland.

=== Mammals ===
Mammals include Artiodactyls (red deer, roe deer, wild boar), carnivores (red fox, least weasel, European polecat, European pine marten, beech marten, stoat, European badger), rodents (murids, red squirrel), lagomorphs (European hare, European rabbit), bats (common pipistrelle, greater mouse-eared bat, brown long-eared bat), and insectivores (European hedgehog, European mole, common shrew, Eurasian pygmy shrew, Eurasian water shrew). The rare, relict Iberian water shrew was noted before 1990 in isolated populations.

== Nature conservation ==
As of 2017, the macroregion includes, wholly or partially, landscape parks: Cedynia Landscape Park (small northeastern part in Myślibórz Lakeland), Barlinek-Gorzów Landscape Park (northern part on the Myślibórz-Choszczno border), Ińsko Landscape Park (Ińsko Lakeland), Drawsko Landscape Park (Drawsko Lakeland), and Słupia Valley Landscape Park (mostly in Polanów Upland).

All nature reserve types, except halophyte reserves, exist (as of 2017). These include forest reserves (Olszyny Ostrowskie in Myślibórz Lakeland, Bukowa Góra nad Pysznem in Bytów Lakeland, Dęby Wilczkowskie in Drawsko Lakeland), landscape reserves (Długogóry in Myślibórz Lakeland, Kamienna Buczyna in Ińsko Lakeland, Five Lakes Valley Nature Reserve in Drawsko Lakeland), floristic reserves (Tchórzyno in Myślibórz Lakeland, Mszar nad jeziorem Piaski in Łobez Upland, Wieleń in Polanów Upland, Jezioro Piekiełko in Bytów Lakeland), peatland reserves (Torfowisko nad Jeziorem Morzysław Mały in Drawsko Lakeland, Mszar koło Starej Dobrzycy in Łobez Upland), water reserves (Jezioro Iłowatka in Bytów Lakeland, Jezioro Czarnówek in Drawsko Lakeland), steppe reserves (Wrzosowiska Cedyńskie in Myślibórz Lakeland), and inanimate nature reserves (Brunatna Gleba in Drawsko Lakeland).

The region hosts Special Protection Areas (Słupia Valley SPA, Drawska SPA, Ińsko SPA, Cedyńska SPA, Witnicko-Dębniańska SPA) and Sites of Community Importance under Natura 2000, including Słupia Valley SCI, Wieprza and Studnica Valley, Radew, Chociel and Chotla Valley, Grabowa Valley, Parsęta Basin, Rega Basin, Ina Valley near Recz, Ińsko Lakeland SCI, and Myślibórz Lakeland SCI.

== Bibliography ==
- Głowaciński, Zbigniew, ed. (2001). Polska czerwona księga zwierząt [Polish Red Data Book of Animals] (in Polish). Vol. 1. Warsaw: Państwowe Wydawnictwo Rolnicze i Leśne. ISBN 83-09-01735-9.
- Jasnowska, Janina; Jasnowski, Mieczysław (1983). Pojezierze Zachodniopomorskie [West Pomeranian Lakeland] (in Polish). Warsaw: Wiedza Powszechna. ISBN 83-214-0359-X.
- Kondracki, Jerzy (2014). Geografia regionalna Polski [Regional Geography of Poland] (in Polish). Warsaw: Wydawnictwo Naukowe PWN. ISBN 978-83-01-16022-7.
- Woś, Alojzy (1999). Klimat Polski [Climate of Poland] (in Polish). Warsaw: Wydawnictwo Naukowe PWN. ISBN 83-01-12780-5.
- Zielony, Roman; Kliczkowska, Anna (2012). Regionalizacja przyrodniczo-leśna Polski 2010 [Natural-Forest Regionalization of Poland 2010] (in Polish). Warsaw: Centrum Informacyjne Lasów Państwowych. ISBN 978-83-61633-62-4.
