= Strzegomino, Pomeranian Voivodeship =

Strzegomino
- Settlement
- Location within Poland
- Coordinates: 54°19′13″N 17°14′3″E
- Country: Poland
- Voivodeship: Pomeranian
- County: Słupsk
- Gmina: Dębnica Kaszubska
- Population: 10

Strzegomino [kɔnraˈdɔvɔ] is a settlement in the administrative district of Gmina Dębnica Kaszubska, within Słupsk County, Pomeranian Voivodeship, in northern Poland. It lies approximately 8 kilometres (5 mi) south-east of Dębnica Kaszubska, 21 km (13 mi) south-east of Słupsk, and 91 km (57 mi) west of the regional capital Gdańsk.

For the history of the region, see History of Pomerania.
