= Wincenty Zakrzewski =

Polish historian (1844–1918)

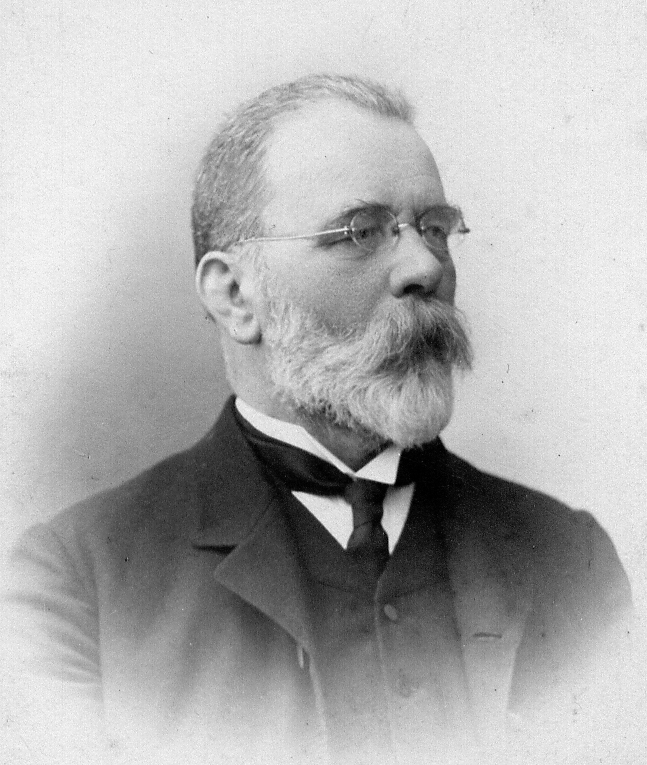
- Born: 11 July 1844; Dobrzykowo, Congress Poland, Russian Empire
- Died: 12 April 1918 (aged 73); Kraków, Kingdom of Poland

Academic background
- Education: Saint Petersburg State University

Academic work
- Discipline: History

Wincenty Zakrzewski (11 July 1844 in Dobrzykowo – 12 April 1918 in Kraków) was a Polish historian. He was a professor of the Jagiellonian University (since 1873), rector in 1890/1891, and a member of the Academy of Learning (since 1881). He participated in the January Uprising (1863–1864).

Zakrzewski researched 16th-century Polish politics. He was an initiator of modern studies about the Reformation in Poland. His notable works includes Powstanie i wzrost reformacji w Polsce 1520–1572 [Beginning and rise of Reformation in Poland 1520–1572] (1870), "Po ucieczce Henryka: dzieje bezkrolewia" [After Henry's escape - the time of interregnum], Stefan Batory... (1887), Historia powszechna [General history] (vol. 1–3; 1899–1903). He was also an initiator of publication Stanislai Hosii epistolae, orationes, legationes [Letters, speeches, legations of Stanislaus Hosius] (vol. 1–2; in: Acta historica res gestas Poloniae illustrantia; 1879–1888).
