= Gogolewko, Pomeranian Voivodeship =

Gogolewko
- Village
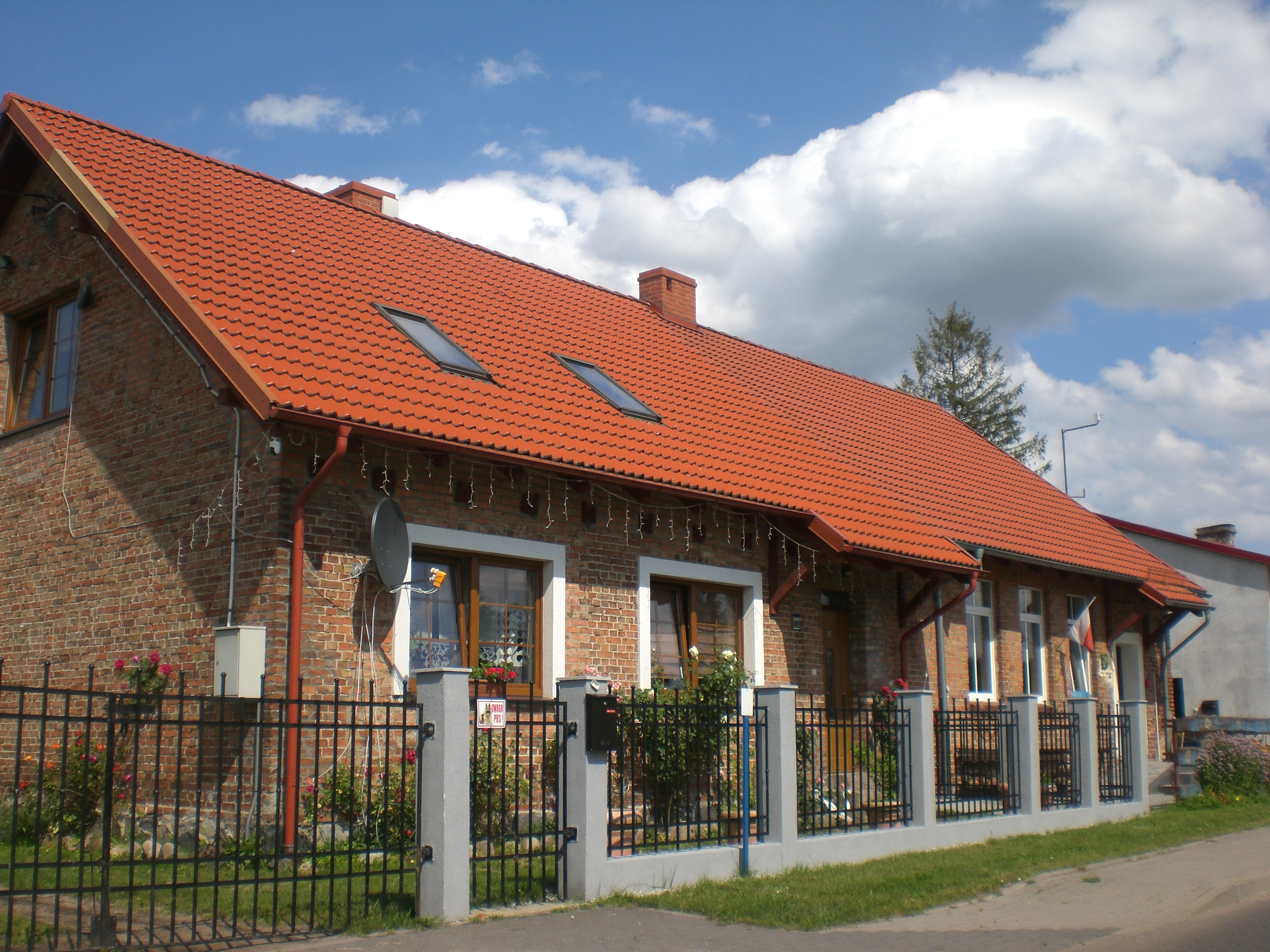

- Location within Poland
- Coordinates: 54°21′48″N 17°25′37″E
- Country: Poland
- Voivodeship: Pomeranian
- County: Słupsk
- Gmina: Dębnica Kaszubska

Population
  - Total: 90
- Time zone: UTC+1 (CET)
  - Summer (DST): UTC+2 (CEST)
- Vehicle registration: GSL

Gogolewko [ɡɔɡɔˈlɛfkɔ] (German: Neu Jugelow) is a village in the administrative district of Gmina Dębnica Kaszubska, within Słupsk County, Pomeranian Voivodeship, in northern Poland.

== Etymology ==
Gogolewko is a diminutive form of the name of the nearby village of Gogolewo, itself of Slavic origin, and named either after the word gogo, a species of wild goose, or after the male name Gogoł or Gogoła.

== History ==
It was established as a linear settlement.

During World War II, on 10 February 1945, the SS marched some 400 women and children from a forced labour camp in nearby Słupsk to a newly established camp near Gogolewko. The Germans regularly used violence against the prisoners, and even hanged a Russian female forced laborer employed in the kitchen for helping the mothers and children. Five-six children died in the camp each day. The camp was liberated in April 1945.

== Nature ==
The Gogolewko nature reserve is located in Gogolewko.
