= Suliszewo =

Suliszewo may refer to the following places:

- Suliszewo, Pomeranian Voivodeship (north Poland)
- Suliszewo, Choszczno County in West Pomeranian Voivodeship (north-west Poland)
- Suliszewo, Drawsko County in West Pomeranian Voivodeship (north-west Poland)
