= Borzęcinko =

- Village
- Location within Poland
- Coordinates: 54°24′47″N 17°13′36″E
- Country: Poland
- Voivodeship: Pomeranian
- County: Słupsk
- Gmina: Dębnica Kaszubska
- Population: 36

Borzęcinko [bɔʐɛnˈt͡ɕinkɔ] is a village in the administrative district of Gmina Dębnica Kaszubska, within Słupsk County, Pomeranian Voivodeship, in northern Poland.

For the history of the region, see History of Pomerania.
