= Niepoględzie =

- Village
- Location within Poland
- Coordinates: 54°17′43″N 17°22′13″E
- Country: Poland
- Voivodeship: Pomeranian
- County: Słupsk
- Gmina: Dębnica Kaszubska
- Population: 373
- Website: http://niepogledzie.pl/

Niepoględzie [ɲɛpɔˈɡlɛnd͡ʑɛ] (German: Nippoglense) is a village in the administrative district of Gmina Dębnica Kaszubska, within Słupsk County, Pomeranian Voivodeship, in northern Poland.

For the history of the region, see History of Pomerania.
