= Dobrzec, Pomeranian Voivodeship =

Dobrzec
- Settlement
- Location within Poland
- Coordinates: 54°23′27″N 17°21′7″E
- Country: Poland
- Voivodeship: Pomeranian
- County: Słupsk
- Gmina: Dębnica Kaszubska

Dobrzec [ˈdɔbʐɛt͡s] is a settlement in the administrative district of Gmina Dębnica Kaszubska, within Słupsk County, Pomeranian Voivodeship, in northern Poland.

For the history of the region, see History of Pomerania.
