= Starniczki =

- Settlement
- Location within Poland
- Coordinates: 54°22′29″N 17°13′24″E
- Country: Poland
- Voivodeship: Pomeranian
- County: Słupsk
- Gmina: Dębnica Kaszubska
- Population: 1

Starniczki [starˈnit͡ʂki] is a settlement in the administrative district of Gmina Dębnica Kaszubska, within Słupsk County, Pomeranian Voivodeship, in northern Poland.

For the history of the region, see History of Pomerania.
