= Łabiszewo-Kolonia =

- Settlement
- Location within Poland
- Coordinates: 54°23′45″N 17°17′6″E
- Country: Poland
- Voivodeship: Pomeranian
- County: Słupsk
- Gmina: Dębnica Kaszubska

Łabiszewo-Kolonia [wabiˈʂɛvɔ kɔˈlɔɲa] is a settlement in the administrative district of Gmina Dębnica Kaszubska, within Słupsk County, Pomeranian Voivodeship, in northern Poland.

For the history of the region, see History of Pomerania.
