= Kotowo, Pomeranian Voivodeship =

Kotowo
- Village
- Location within Poland
- Coordinates: 54°20′12″N 17°20′56″E
- Country: Poland
- Voivodeship: Pomeranian
- County: Słupsk
- Gmina: Dębnica Kaszubska
- Population: 174

Kotowo [kɔˈtɔvɔ] (German: Kottow) is a village in the administrative district of Gmina Dębnica Kaszubska, within Słupsk County, Pomeranian Voivodeship, in northern Poland.

For the history of the region, see History of Pomerania.
