= Podwilczyn =

- Village
- Location within Poland
- Coordinates: 54°17′39″N 17°9′36″E
- Country: Poland
- Voivodeship: Pomeranian
- County: Słupsk
- Gmina: Dębnica Kaszubska
- Population: 196

Podwilczyn [pɔdˈvilt͡ʂɨn] (German: Podewilshausen) is a village in the administrative district of Gmina Dębnica Kaszubska, within Słupsk County, Pomeranian Voivodeship, in northern Poland.

Before 1648 the area was part of Duchy of Pomerania, Prussia and Germany. For the history of the region, see History of Pomerania.
