= Jawory, Pomeranian Voivodeship =

Jawory
- Village
- Location within Poland
- Coordinates: 54°19′10″N 17°25′6″E
- Country: Poland
- Voivodeship: Pomeranian
- County: Słupsk
- Gmina: Dębnica Kaszubska
- Population: 150

Jawory [jaˈvɔrɨ] (German: Gaffert) is a village in the administrative district of Gmina Dębnica Kaszubska, within Słupsk County, Pomeranian Voivodeship, in northern Poland.

For the history of the region, see History of Pomerania.
