= Maleniec, Pomeranian Voivodeship =

Maleniec
- Village
- Location within Poland
- Coordinates: 54°20′42″N 17°26′54″E
- Country: Poland
- Voivodeship: Pomeranian
- County: Słupsk
- Gmina: Dębnica Kaszubska
- Population: 80

Maleniec [maˈlɛɲɛt͡s] is a village in the administrative district of Gmina Dębnica Kaszubska, within Słupsk County, Pomeranian Voivodeship, in northern Poland.

For the history of the region, see History of Pomerania.
