= Leśnia =

- Village
- Location within Poland
- Coordinates: 54°21′33″N 17°16′48″E
- Country: Poland
- Voivodeship: Pomeranian
- County: Słupsk
- Gmina: Dębnica Kaszubska
- Population: 38

Leśnia [ˈlɛɕɲa] is a village in the administrative district of Gmina Dębnica Kaszubska, within Słupsk County, Pomeranian Voivodeship, in northern Poland.

For the history of the region, see History of Pomerania.
