= Goszczyno, Słupsk County =

Goszczyno
- Settlement
- Location within Poland
- Coordinates: 54°19′8″N 17°17′29″E
- Country: Poland
- Voivodeship: Pomeranian
- County: Słupsk
- Gmina: Dębnica Kaszubska
- Population: 46

Goszczyno [ɡɔʂˈt͡ʂɨnɔ] is a settlement in the administrative district of Gmina Dębnica Kaszubska, within Słupsk County, Pomeranian Voivodeship, in northern Poland.

For the history of the region, see History of Pomerania.
