= Skarszów Górny =

- Village
- Location within Poland
- Coordinates: 54°22′50″N 17°7′31″E
- Country: Poland
- Voivodeship: Pomeranian
- County: Słupsk
- Gmina: Dębnica Kaszubska
- Population: 271

Skarszów Górny [ˈskarʂuf ˈɡurnɨ] (German: Scharsow) is a village in the administrative district of Gmina Dębnica Kaszubska, within Słupsk County, Pomeranian Voivodeship, in northern Poland.

For the history of the region, see History of Pomerania.
