= Starnice =

- Village
- Location within Poland
- Coordinates: 54°23′21″N 17°13′58″E
- Country: Poland
- Voivodeship: Pomeranian
- County: Słupsk
- Gmina: Dębnica Kaszubska
- Population: 270

Starnice [starˈnit͡sɛ] (German: Starnitz) is a village in the administrative district of Gmina Dębnica Kaszubska, within Słupsk County, Pomeranian Voivodeship, in northern Poland.

For the history of the region, see History of Pomerania.
