= Budowo =

- Village
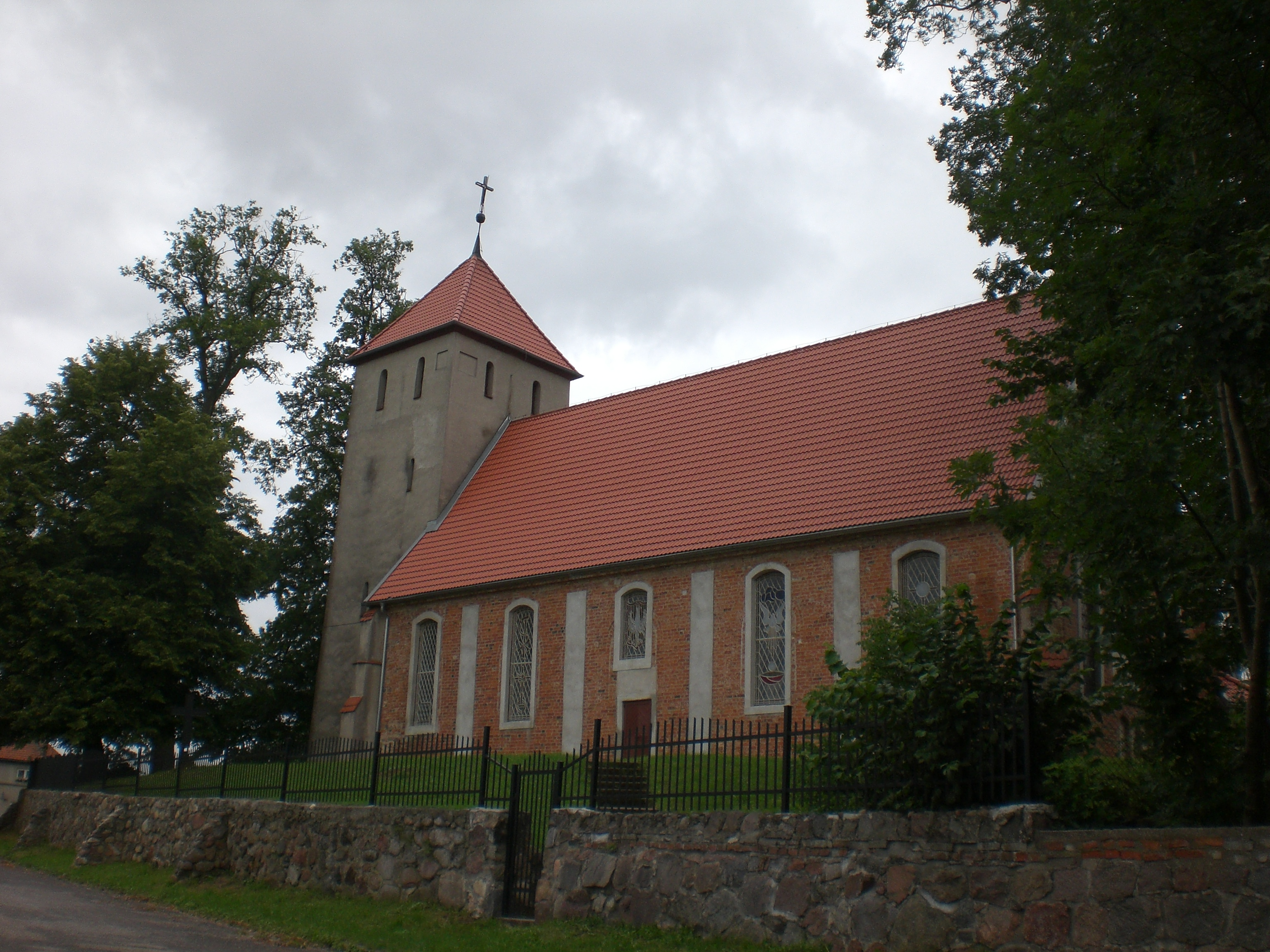
- Virgin Mary Queen of Poland church in Budowo

- Location within Poland
- Coordinates: 54°19′19″N 17°23′34″E
- Country: Poland
- Voivodeship: Pomeranian
- County: Słupsk
- Gmina: Dębnica Kaszubska

Population
  - Total: 829
- Time zone: UTC+1 (CET)
  - Summer (DST): UTC+2 (CEST)
- Postal code: 76-248
- Vehicle registration: GSL

Budowo [buˈdɔvɔ] (German: Budow) is a village in the administrative district of Gmina Dębnica Kaszubska, within Słupsk County, Pomeranian Voivodeship, in northern Poland. It is located in the historic region of Pomerania.

Historically, it was also known in Polish as Budowo and Budów.
