= Spole =

- Settlement
- Location within Poland
- Coordinates: 54°20′24″N 17°15′15″E
- Country: Poland
- Voivodeship: Pomeranian
- County: Słupsk
- Gmina: Dębnica Kaszubska
- Population: 11

Spole [ˈspɔlɛ] is a settlement in the administrative district of Gmina Dębnica Kaszubska, within Słupsk County, Pomeranian Voivodeship, in northern Poland.

== History ==
For the history of the region, see History of Pomerania.
