= Podole Małe =

- Village
- Location within Poland
- Coordinates: 54°22′54″N 17°18′36″E
- Country: Poland
- Voivodeship: Pomeranian
- County: Słupsk
- Gmina: Dębnica Kaszubska
- Population: 260

Podole Małe [pɔˈdɔlɛ ˈmawɛ] (German: Klein Podel) is a village in the administrative district of Gmina Dębnica Kaszubska, within Słupsk County, Pomeranian Voivodeship, in northern Poland.

There is a 19th-century Palace Park in the village, designed in a landscape style around a manor owned by the Central Pomeranian noble family von Zitzewitz. In 1997, it was entered into the register of monuments as an immovable heritage site.

For the history of the region, see History of Pomerania.
