= Mielno, Słupsk County =

Mielno
- Village
- Location within Poland
- Coordinates: 54°18′10″N 17°6′41″E
- Country: Poland
- Voivodeship: Pomeranian
- County: Słupsk
- Gmina: Dębnica Kaszubska
- Population: 187

Mielno [ˈmjɛlnɔ] (German: Mellin) is a village in the administrative district of Gmina Dębnica Kaszubska, within Słupsk County, Pomeranian Voivodeship, in northern Poland.

For the history of the region, see History of Pomerania.
