= Dębnica Kaszubska =

- Village
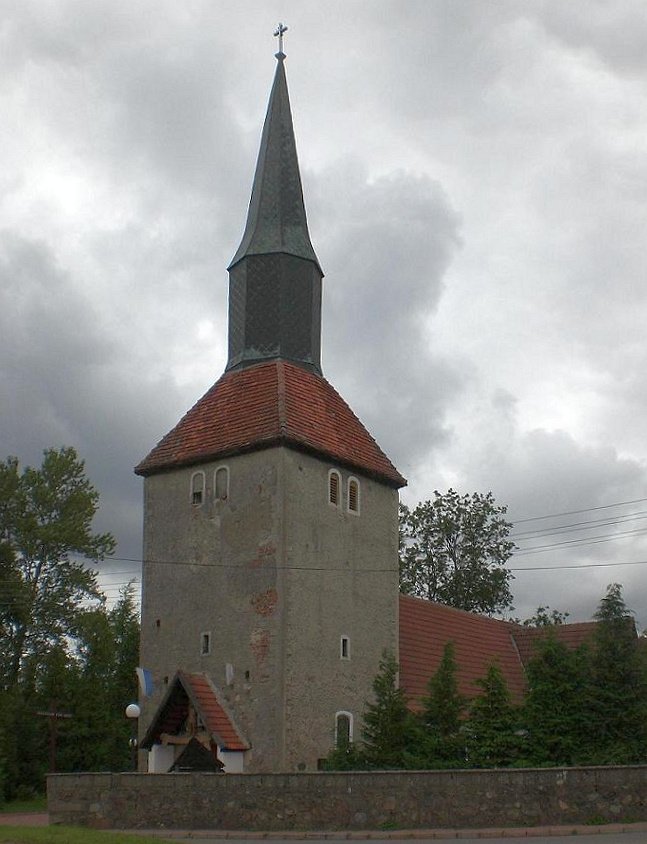
- The church of St. John the Baptist

- Location within Poland
- Coordinates: 54°22′26″N 17°9′38″E
- Country: Poland
- Voivodeship: Pomeranian
- County: Słupsk
- Gmina: Dębnica Kaszubska
- Population: 3,220

Dębnica Kaszubska [dɛmbˈnit͡sa kaˈʂupska] (German: Rathsdamnitz) is a village in Słupsk County, Pomeranian Voivodeship, in northern Poland. It is the seat of the gmina (administrative district) called Gmina Dębnica Kaszubska.

For the history of the region, see History of Pomerania.
