= Dobieszewo, Pomeranian Voivodeship =

Dobieszewo
- Village
- Location within Poland
- Coordinates: 54°22′39″N 17°17′35″E
- Country: Poland
- Voivodeship: Pomeranian
- County: Słupsk
- Gmina: Dębnica Kaszubska
- Population: 175

Dobieszewo [dɔbjɛˈʂɛvɔ] (German: Groß Dübsow) is a village in the administrative district of Gmina Dębnica Kaszubska, within Słupsk County, Pomeranian Voivodeship, in northern Poland.

For the history of the region, see History of Pomerania.
