= Polanów Upland =

Mesoregion in northwestern Poland

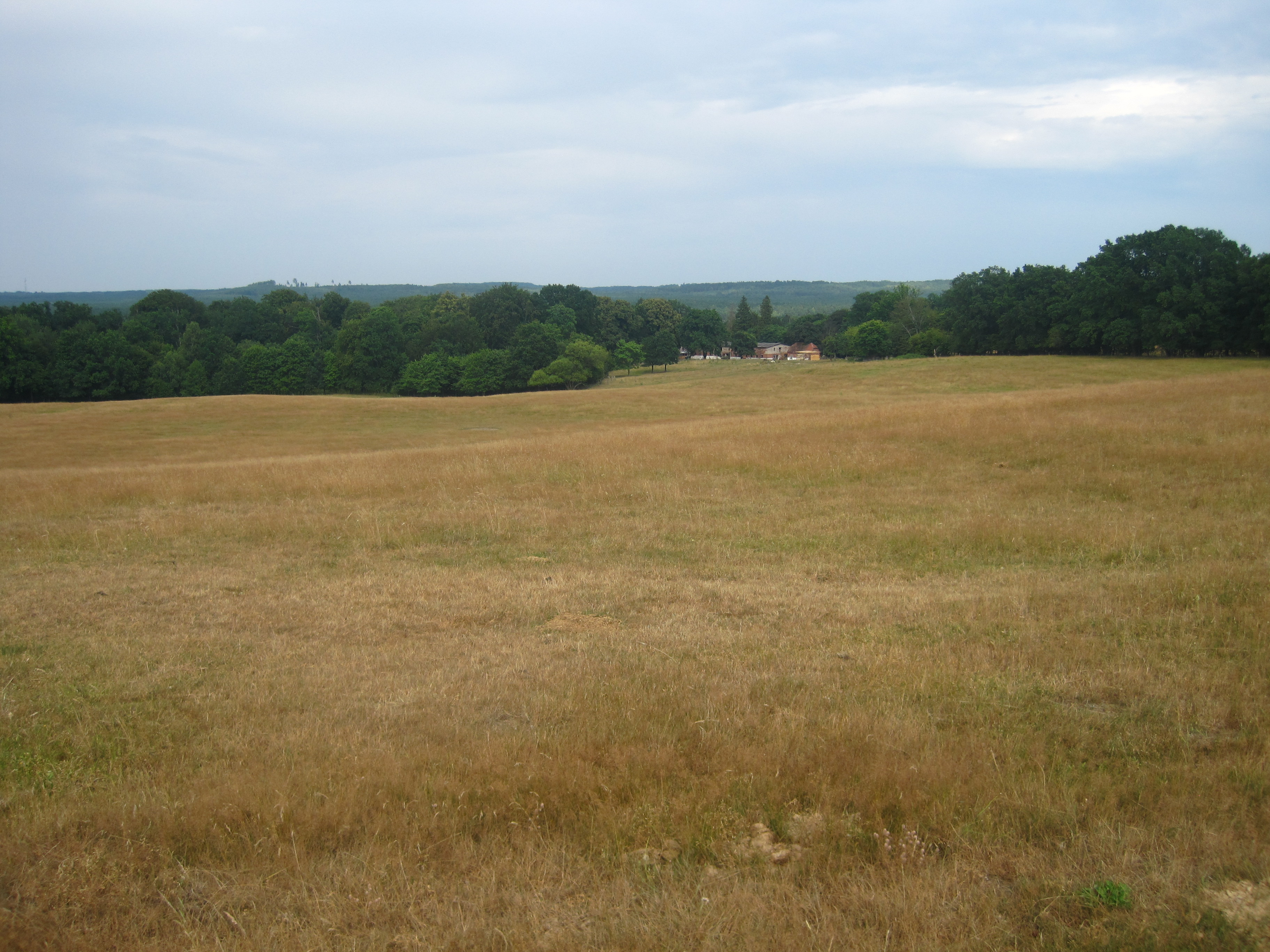
Landscape of the Polanów Upland in the vicinity of Krzynia

The Polanów Upland is a mesoregion within the West Pomeranian Lake Land, forming the central part of the morainic lake district belt.

It serves as a transitional area between the low-lying plains of the Koszalin Coastland and the higher elevations of the terminal moraine chain of the Bytów Lake Land. Covering approximately 1,700 km², it borders the Białogard Plain and Drawsko Lake Land to the west, the Słupsk Plain and Damnica Upland to the north, the Kashubian Lake District to the east, and the Bytów Lake Land to the south. According to Tomasz Larczyński, the highest point is Świerczogóra (191 m above sea level) near Rzeczyca Wielka. However, in an alternative physical-geographical division proposed by Józef Sylwestrzak, the Polanów Upland is not distinguished as a separate mesoregion, with most of its area included within a broader definition of the Bytów Lake Land.

Like other mesoregions of the West Pomeranian Lake Land, the Polanów Upland is characterized by a lake district landscape. Its terrain was shaped by the retreat of the last glaciation during the Pomeranian phase. As the ice sheet receded, it deposited material brought from the north, including gravel, sand, clay, and boulders.

== Hydrography ==
Several major coastal rivers flow through the Polanów Upland, including the Radew, Grabowa, Wieprza, Słupia, and Łupawa. Lakes are scarce, with a higher concentration in the eastern part of the mesoregion. Two reference lakes, Jasień Południowy and Jasień Północny, which form the Jasień lake complex, are monitored for changes in surface water conditions. In 2012, their chemical status was rated as good. However, between 2010 and 2013, the ecological status of Jasień Północny declined from very good to good, and Jasień Południowy from good to moderate. In the 1980s, both lakes failed to meet standards due to high dipsy content.

== Fauna ==
The diversity of habitats in the Polanów Upland supports a wide range of species. The islands of Lake Jasień serve as breeding grounds for waterfowl such as common merganser, common goldeneye, tufted duck, common sandpiper, and potentially great cormorant. Other species recorded on these islands include common starling, marsh tit, red-breasted flycatcher, spotted flycatcher, and European green woodpecker. The Nests of the White-tailed Eagle reserve hosts breeding sites for the white-tailed eagle. The Bat Well reserve is home to species such as Natterer's bat, brown long-eared bat, and Daubenton's bat.

== Flora ==
The Polanów Upland is heavily forested, predominantly with mixed forests. The potential natural vegetation includes both acidic and fertile beech forests, as well as mixed and pine forests. Peatland vegetation is abundant. The Zieliń Miastecki Peatland nature reserve hosts species such as brown beaksedge, white beak-sedge, Rannoch-rush, bog-sedge, oblong-leaved sundew, round-leaved sundew, cross-leaved heath, lesser bladderwort, and flatleaf bladderwort. The Wieleń reserve features Hildenbrandia rivularis, along with mosses such as Loeskeobryum brevirostre, Plagiothecium neglectum, Brachythecium rivulare, and Eurhynchium striatum. The Grabowa River Reserve is home to Siberian columbine meadow-rue and black pea. In the Huczek stream valley, species like bird's-nest orchid, great horsetail, and mezereum are found.

== Nature conservation ==
A significant portion of the Słupia Valley Landscape Park extends across the Polanów Upland. As of 2017, the mesoregion includes several nature reserves: Wieleń (floristic), Potoczek Peatland, Zieliń Miastecki Peatland, Źródliskowe Peatland, Mechowiska Czaple, Skotawskie Meadows (all peatland reserves), Huczek Valley (forest), Grabowa River Reserve (faunistic), Sitna Lakes (aquatic), Nests of the White-tailed Eagle, and Gołębia Góra.
