= Dobrzykowo, Pomeranian Voivodeship =

Dobrzykowo
- Settlement
- Location within Poland
- Coordinates: 54°18′14″N 17°09′44″E
- Country: Poland
- Voivodeship: Pomeranian
- County: Słupsk
- Gmina: Dębnica Kaszubska
- Population: 10

Dobrzykowo [dɔbʐɨˈkɔvɔ] is a settlement in the administrative district of Gmina Dębnica Kaszubska, within Słupsk County, Pomeranian Voivodeship, in northern Poland.

For the history of the region, see History of Pomerania.
