= Dobra, Pomeranian Voivodeship =

Dobra
- Village
- Location within Poland
- Coordinates: 54°22′56″N 17°22′5″E
- Country: Poland
- Voivodeship: Pomeranian
- County: Słupsk
- Gmina: Dębnica Kaszubska
- Population: 130

Dobra [ˈdɔbra] (German: Daber) is a village in the administrative district of Gmina Dębnica Kaszubska, within Słupsk County, Pomeranian Voivodeship, in northern Poland.
