= Brzeziniec, Pomeranian Voivodeship =

Brzeziniec
- Settlement
- Location within Poland
- Coordinates: 54°24′42″N 17°12′2″E
- Country: Poland
- Voivodeship: Pomeranian
- County: Słupsk
- Gmina: Dębnica Kaszubska
- Population: 33

Brzeziniec [bʐɛˈʑiɲɛt͡s] is a settlement in the administrative district of Gmina Dębnica Kaszubska, within Słupsk County, Pomeranian Voivodeship, in northern Poland.

For the history of the region, see History of Pomerania.
