= Żarkowo =

- Village
- Location within Poland
- Coordinates: 54°22′28″N 17°19′27″E
- Country: Poland
- Voivodeship: Pomeranian
- County: Słupsk
- Gmina: Dębnica Kaszubska
- Population: 50

Żarkowo [ʐarˈkɔvɔ] is a village in the administrative district of Gmina Dębnica Kaszubska, within Słupsk County, Pomeranian Voivodeship, in northern Poland.

For the history of the region, see History of Pomerania.
