= Krzynia =

- Village
- Location within Poland
- Coordinates: 54°20′47″N 17°12′16″E
- Country: Poland
- Voivodeship: Pomeranian
- County: Słupsk
- Gmina: Dębnica Kaszubska
- Population: 44

Krzynia [ˈkʂɨɲa] (German: Krien) is a village in the administrative district of Gmina Dębnica Kaszubska, within Słupsk County, Pomeranian Voivodeship, in northern Poland.

For the history of the region, see History of Pomerania.
