= Borzęcino, Pomeranian Voivodeship =

Borzęcino
- Village
- Location within Poland
- Coordinates: 54°24′23″N 17°15′14″E
- Country: Poland
- Voivodeship: Pomeranian
- County: Słupsk
- Gmina: Dębnica Kaszubska
- Population: 384

Borzęcino [bɔʐɛnˈt͡ɕinɔ] (German: Bornzin) is a village in the administrative district of Gmina Dębnica Kaszubska, within Słupsk County, Pomeranian Voivodeship, in northern Poland.

For the history of the region, see History of Pomerania.
