= Gogolewo, Słupsk County =

Gogolewo
- Village
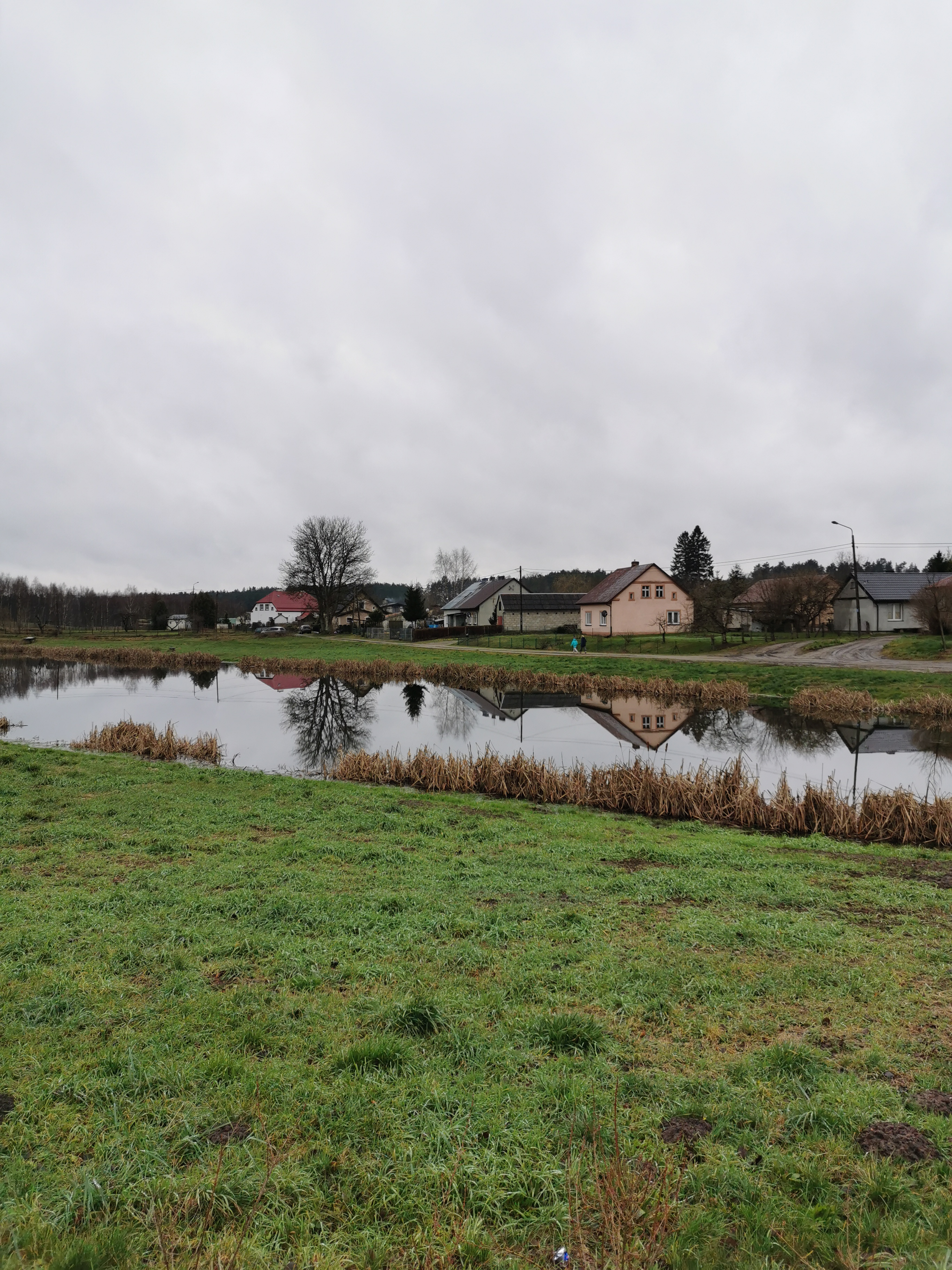

- Location within Poland
- Coordinates: 54°22′25″N 17°23′27″E
- Country: Poland
- Voivodeship: Pomeranian
- County: Słupsk
- Gmina: Dębnica Kaszubska
- First mentioned: 1229

Population
  - Total: 300
- Time zone: UTC+1 (CET)
  - Summer (DST): UTC+2 (CEST)
- Vehicle registration: GSL

Gogolewo [ɡɔɡɔˈlɛvɔ] (German: Alt Jugelow) is a village in the administrative district of Gmina Dębnica Kaszubska, within Słupsk County, Pomeranian Voivodeship, in northern Poland.

== Etymology ==
The name of the village is of Slavic origin, and comes either from the word gogo, a species of wild goose, or from the male name Gogoł or Gogoła.

== History ==
Gogolewo is one of the oldest villages in the area, being first attested in documents in 1229, when Duke Barnim I confirmed its endowment to the Knights Hospitaller.
