= Gmina Dębnica Kaszubska =

Gmina Dębnica Kaszubska Dębnica Kaszubska Commune
- Gmina
- Coat of arms
- Interactive map of Gmina Dębnica Kaszubska
- Coordinates (Dębnica Kaszubska): 54°22′26″N 17°9′38″E
- Country: Poland
- Voivodeship: Pomeranian
- County: Słupsk County
- Seat: Dębnica Kaszubska

Area
  - Total: 300.02 km^{2} (115.84 sq mi)

Population (2006)
  - Total: 9,422
  - Density: 31.40/km^{2} (81.34/sq mi)
- Website: http://www.debnica.pl

Gmina Dębnica Kaszubska is a rural gmina (administrative district) in Słupsk County, Pomeranian Voivodeship, in northern Poland. Its seat is the village of Dębnica Kaszubska, which lies approximately 14 kilometres (9 mi) south-east of Słupsk and 96 km (60 mi) west of the regional capital Gdańsk.

The gmina covers an area of 300.02 square kilometres (115.8 sq mi), and as of 2006 its total population is 9,422.

The gmina contains part of the protected area called Słupia Valley Landscape Park.

== Villages ==
Gmina Dębnica Kaszubska contains the villages and settlements of Boguszyce, Borzęcinko, Borzęcino, Brzeziniec, Budówko, Budowo, Dargacz, Dębnica Kaszubska, Dobieszewko, Dobieszewo, Dobra, Dobrzec, Dobrzykowo, Dudzicze, Gałęzów, Gogolewko, Gogolewo, Goszczyno, Grabin, Grabówko, Jamrzyno, Jawory, Konradowo, Kotowo, Krzynia, Krzywań, Łabiszewo, Łabiszewo-Kolonia, Leśnia, Łysomice, Łysomiczki, Maleniec, Mielno, Motarzyno, Niemczewo, Niepoględzie, Ochodza, Podole Małe, Podwilczyn, Skarszów Dolny, Skarszów Górny, Spole, Starnice, Starniczki, Suliszewo, Troszki and Żarkowo.

== Neighbouring gminas ==
Gmina Dębnica Kaszubska is bordered by the gminas of Borzytuchom, Czarna Dąbrówka, Damnica, Kobylnica, Kołczygłowy, Potęgowo, Słupsk and Trzebielino.
