= Słupia Valley Landscape Park =

Protected area in Poland

Coordinates: 54.3014°N 17.2456°E

- Park Krajobrazowy Dolina Słupi
- IUCN category V (protected landscape/seascape)
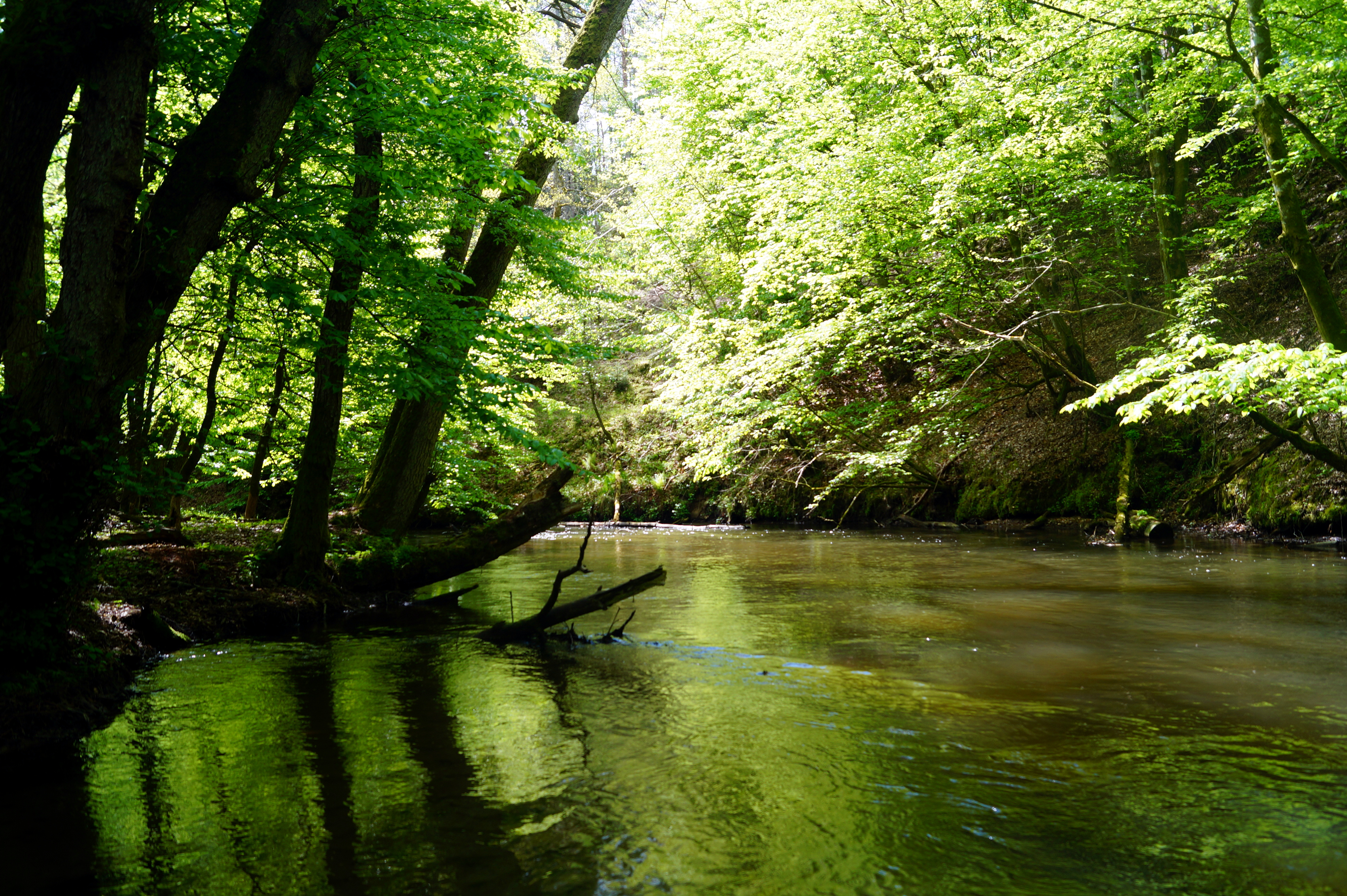
- Słupia River in the park
- Interactive map of Słupia Valley Landscape Park
- Location: Pomeranian Voivodeship
- Area: 370.4 km^{2} (143.0 sq mi)
- Established: 1981

Słupia Valley Landscape Park (Park Krajobrazowy Dolina Słupi) is a protected area (Landscape Park) in northern Poland.

== Geography ==
The park was established in 1981, and is a Natura 2000 EU Special Protection Area.

In 2003, at least one wolf family lived here, and before 1900 bears were encountered.

It protects an area of 370.4 square kilometres (143.0 sq mi). Within the Landscape Park are four nature reserves.

=== Flora ===
476 species of vascular plants have been identified in the park, including 24 fully protected and 9 partially protected. The area is characterized by high forest cover. Forests cover 72% of its area. Fresh pine forests have a significant share in this, where the predominant species is Scots pine, mainly planted. Additionally, one can meet trees not originally found in this area, such as: Norway spruce, Douglas fir, European silver fir, Weymouth pine and pitch pine. The park's pine forests are diverse in terms of age, but most of them do not exceed 120 years. The oldest stands, estimated to be 160 years old, are, among others, in the vicinity of the village of Jutrzenka.

=== Counties and Gminas ===
The Park lies within Pomeranian Voivodeship, in

- Bytów County — Gmina Bytów, Gmina Borzytuchom, Gmina Czarna Dąbrówka, and Gmina Kołczygłowy
- Słupsk County — Gmina Dębnica Kaszubska, Gmina Kobylnica, and Gmina Słupsk.

== See also ==
- Landscape parks in Poland
- Special Protection Areas in Poland
- Natura 2000 in Poland
