= 1969 European Athletics Championships – Women's 4 × 100 metres relay =

Women's 4 × 100 metres relay at the European Athletics Championships

The women's 4 × 100 metres relay at the 1969 European Athletics Championships was held in Athens, Greece, at Georgios Karaiskakis Stadium on 19 and 20 September 1969.

== Medalists ==
Gold	Regina Höfer; Renate Meissner; Bärbel Podeswa; Petra Vogt; East Germany
Silver	Bärbel Hähnle; Jutta Stöck; Rita Wilden; Ingrid Becker; West Germany
Bronze	Anita Neil; Denise Ramsden; Sheila Cooper; Val Peat; Great Britain

== Results ==
=== Final ===
20 September

Rank	Nation	Competitors	Time	Notes
1st place, gold medalist(s)	East Germany	Regina Höfer; Renate Meissner; Bärbel Podeswa; Petra Vogt	43.61	CR
2nd place, silver medalist(s)	West Germany	Bärbel Hähnle; Jutta Stöck; Rita Wilden; Ingrid Becker	44.09	
3rd place, bronze medalist(s)	Great Britain	Anita Neil; Denise Ramsden; Sheila Cooper; Val Peat	44.39	
4	France	Gabrielle Meyer; Sylviane Telliez; Nicole Montandon; Véronique Grandrieux	44.6	
5	Poland	Krystyna Mandecka; Danuta Jędrejek; Urszula Jóźwik; Mirosława Sarna	44.7	
6	Soviet Union	Nadezhda Besfamilnaya; Lyudmila Golomazova; Lyudmila Samotyosova; Galina Mitrokhina	44.8	
7	Austria	Liesel Prokop; Helga Kapfer; Maria Sykora; Erika Kren	45.8	NR
	Sweden	Elisabeth Randerz; Gun Olsson; Karin Lundgren; Margaretha Larsson	DNS	

=== Heats ===
19 September

==== Heat 1 ====
Rank	Nation	Competitors	Time	Notes
1	Great Britain	Anita Neil; Denise Ramsden; Sheila Cooper; Val Peat	45.0	Q
2	France	Gabrielle Meyer; Sylviane Telliez; Nicole Montandon; Véronique Grandrieux	45.6	Q
3	Sweden	Elisabeth Randerz; Gun Olsson; Karin Lundgren; Margaretha Larsson	46.4	q

==== Heat 2 ====
Rank	Nation	Competitors	Time	Notes
1	West Germany	Bärbel Hähnle; Jutta Stöck; Rita Wilden; Ingrid Becker	44.6	Q
2	Soviet Union	Nadezhda Besfamilnaya; Lyudmila Golomazova; Lyudmila Samotyosova; Galina Mitrokhina	45.2	Q
3	Austria	Liesel Prokop; Helga Kapfer; Maria Sykora; Erika Kren	46.5	NR q

==== Heat 3 ====
Rank	Nation	Competitors	Time	Notes
1	East Germany	Regina Höfer; Renate Meissner; Bärbel Podeswa; Petra Vogt	44.2	CR Q
2	Poland	Krystyna Mandecka; Danuta Jędrejek; Urszula Jóźwik; Mirosława Sarna	45.5	Q
3	Greece	Ekaterini Reizi; Eleni Vrettakou; Charoula Sasagianni; Theodora Miniati	49.2	

== Participation ==
According to an unofficial count, 36 athletes from 9 countries participated in the event.

- Austria (4)
- East Germany (4)
- France (4)
- Greece (4)
- Poland (4)
- Soviet Union (4)
- Sweden (4)
- Great Britain (4)
- West Germany (4)
