= 1974 European Athletics Championships – Women's 4 × 100 metres relay =

Women's 4 × 100 metres relay at the European Athletics Championships

The women's 4 × 100 metres relay at the 1974 European Athletics Championships was held in Rome, Italy, at Stadio Olimpico on 8 September 1974.

== Medalists ==
Gold	Doris Maletzki; Renate Stecher; Christina Heinich; Bärbel Eckert; East Germany
Silver	Elfgard Schittenhelm; Annegret Kroniger; Annegret Richter; Inge Helten; West Germany
Bronze	Ewa Długołęcka; Danuta Jędrejek; Barbara Bakulin; Irena Szewińska; Poland

== Results ==
=== Final ===
8 September

Rank	Lane	Nation	Competitors	Time	Notes
1st place, gold medalist(s)	3	East Germany	Doris Maletzki; Renate Stecher; Christina Heinich; Bärbel Eckert	42.51	WR
2nd place, silver medalist(s)	5	West Germany	Elfgard Schittenhelm; Annegret Kroniger; Annegret Richter; Inge Helten	42.75	NR
3rd place, bronze medalist(s)	4	Poland	Ewa Długołęcka; Danuta Jędrejek; Barbara Bakulin; Irena Szewińska	43.48	
4	2	Great Britain	Linda Barratt; Denise Ramsden; Helen Golden; Andrea Lynch	43.94	
5	1	France	Nadine Goletto; Catherine Delachanal; Nicole Pani; Sylviane Telliez	44.18	NR
6	6	Hungary	Judit Szabó; Ildiko Szabó; Zsuzsa Karoly; Iren Orosz	44.51	NR
7	8	Italy	Maura Gnecchi; Adriana Carli; Laura Nappi; Cecilia Molinari	44.56	NR
	7	Soviet Union		DNS	

== Participation ==
According to an unofficial count, 28 athletes from 7 countries participated in the event.

- East Germany (4)
- France (4)
- Hungary (4)
- Italy (4)
- Poland (4)
- Great Britain (4)
- West Germany (4)
