= 1973 European Athletics Indoor Championships – Women's 60 metres =

The women's 60 metres event at the 1973 European Athletics Indoor Championships was held on 11 March in Rotterdam.

== Medalists ==
Gold	Silver	Bronze
Annegret Richter; West Germany	Petra Kandarr; East Germany	Sylviane Telliez; France

== Results ==
=== Heats ===
First 2 from each heat (Q) and the next 2 fastest (q) qualified for the semifinals.

Rank	Heat	Name	Nationality	Time	Notes
1	2	Petra Kandarr	East Germany	7.34	Q
2	5	Annegret Richter	West Germany	7.36	Q
3	2	Yordanka Yankova	Bulgaria	7.38	Q
4	1	Sylviane Telliez	France	7.39	Q
5	4	Doris Selmigkeit	East Germany	7.40	Q
6	2	Andrea Lynch	Great Britain	7.42	q
6	3	Ivanka Valkova	Bulgaria	7.42	Q
8	3	Irena Szewińska	Poland	7.43	Q
9	1	Elke Hahmann	East Germany	7.44	Q
9	3	Christiane Krause	West Germany	7.44	q
11	4	Tuula Rautanen	Finland	7.48	Q
12	5	Mona-Lisa Strandvall	Finland	7.53	Q
13	5	Linda Haglund	Sweden	7.57	
14	1	Brigitte Haest	Austria	7.59	NR
14	4	Cecilia Molinari	Italy	7.59	
16	3	Valeria Bufanu	Romania	7.61	NR
17	1	Maria Żukowska	Poland	7.64	
18	2	Danuta Jędrejek	Poland	7.65	
18	2	Michèle Beugnet	France	7.65	
18	5	Marina Sidorova	Soviet Union	7.65	
21	5	Christine Kepplinger	Austria	7.67	
22	2	Ilona Bruzsenyák	Hungary	7.70	
23	4	Mieke van Wissen	Netherlands	7.74	
24	3	Véronique Colonval	Belgium	7.78	
25	1	Natalya Matveyeva	Soviet Union	7.81	
26	4	Jarmila Nygrýnová	Czechoslovakia	7.83	

=== Semifinals ===
First 3 from each heat (Q) qualified directly for the final.

Rank	Heat	Name	Nationality	Time	Notes
1	1	Petra Kandarr	East Germany	7.33	Q
2	1	Sylviane Telliez	France	7.46	Q
3	1	Christiane Krause	West Germany	7.41	Q
4	1	Ivanka Valkova	Bulgaria	7.42	
5	1	Elke Hahmann	East Germany	7.46	
6	1	Tuula Rautanen	Finland	7.51	
1	2	Annegret Richter	West Germany	7.29	Q, =WB
2	2	Irena Szewińska	Poland	7.37	Q
3	2	Doris Selmigkeit	East Germany	7.37	Q
4	2	Yordanka Yankova	Bulgaria	7.38	
5	2	Andrea Lynch	Great Britain	7.44	
6	2	Mona-Lisa Strandvall	Finland	7.50	

=== Final ===
Rank	Name	Nationality	Time	Notes
1st place, gold medalist(s)	Annegret Richter	West Germany	7.27	=WB
2nd place, silver medalist(s)	Petra Kandarr	East Germany	7.29	NR
3rd place, bronze medalist(s)	Sylviane Telliez	France	7.32	NR
4	Irena Szewińska	Poland	7.35	
5	Christiane Krause	West Germany	7.36	
6	Doris Selmigkeit	East Germany	7.43	
