= 1972 European Athletics Indoor Championships – Women's 50 metres =

The women's 50 metres event at the 1972 European Athletics Indoor Championships was held on 12 March in Grenoble.

== Medalists ==
Gold	Silver	Bronze
Renate Stecher; East Germany	Annegret Richter; West Germany	Sylviane Telliez; France

== Results ==
=== Heats ===
First 2 from each heat (Q) and the next 2 fastest (q) qualified for the semifinals.

Rank	Heat	Name	Nationality	Time	Notes
1	1	Renate Stecher	East Germany	6.33	Q, NR
2	4	Annegret Richter	West Germany	6.35	Q
3	3	Inge Helten	West Germany	6.36	Q
4	2	Sylviane Telliez	France	6.37	Q
5	3	Sonia Lannaman	Great Britain	6.40	Q
6	2	Elfgard Schittenhelm	West Germany	6.42	Q
7	3	Nadezhda Besfamilnaya	Soviet Union	6.44	q
8	4	Michèle Beugnet	France	6.46	Q
9	1	Madeleine Cobb	Great Britain	6.47	Q
10	4	Irena Szewińska	Poland	6.49	q
11	4	Christine Kepplinger	Austria	6.50	q
12	3	Monika Holzschuster	Austria	6.51	q
13	2	Aurelia Mărăşescu	Romania	6.55	
13	3	Tuula Rautanen	Finland	6.55	
15	2	Cecilia Molinari	Italy	6.57	
16	1	Laura Nappi	Italy	6.59	
17	1	Mariana Goth	Romania	6.60	
18	4	Galina Mitrokhina	Soviet Union	6.61	
19	2	Linda Haglund	Sweden	6.62	

=== Semifinals ===
First 3 from each heat (Q) qualified directly for the final.

Rank	Heat	Name	Nationality	Time	Notes
1	2	Annegret Richter	West Germany	6.32	Q, =WB
2	1	Renate Stecher	East Germany	6.33	Q, NR
3	2	Sylviane Telliez	France	6.35	Q
4	1	Inge Helten	West Germany	6.39	Q
5	1	Elfgard Schittenhelm	West Germany	6.42	Q
6	2	Irena Szewińska	Poland	6.44	Q
7	2	Sonia Lannaman	Great Britain	6.46	
8	1	Madeleine Cobb	Great Britain	6.49	
9	2	Nadezhda Besfamilnaya	Soviet Union	6.50	
10	2	Monika Holzschuster	Austria	6.50	
11	1	Michèle Beugnet	France	6.52	
12	1	Christine Kepplinger	Austria	6.54	

=== Final ===
Rank	Name	Nationality	Time	Notes
1st place, gold medalist(s)	Renate Stecher	East Germany	6.25	WB
2nd place, silver medalist(s)	Annegret Richter	West Germany	6.28	NR
3rd place, bronze medalist(s)	Sylviane Telliez	France	6.31	NR
4	Inge Helten	West Germany	6.34	
5	Elfgard Schittenhelm	West Germany	6.34	
6	Irena Szewińska	Poland	6.39	NR
