= Kramarzynki =

- Settlement
- Location within Poland
- Coordinates: 54°3′56″N 17°13′11″E
- Country: Poland
- Voivodeship: Pomeranian
- County: Bytów
- Gmina: Tuchomie

Kramarzynki [kramaˈʐɨnki] is a settlement in the administrative district of Gmina Tuchomie, within Bytów County, Pomeranian Voivodeship, in northern Poland. It lies approximately 10 kilometres (6 mi) south-west of Tuchomie, 20 km (12 mi) west of Bytów, and 98 km (61 mi) west of the regional capital Gdańsk.

For details of the history of the region, see History of Pomerania.
