= Tesmarówka =

- Settlement
- Location within Poland
- Coordinates: 54°3′48″N 17°16′58″E
- Country: Poland
- Voivodeship: Pomeranian
- County: Bytów
- Gmina: Tuchomie

Tesmarówka [tɛsmaˈrufka] is a settlement in the administrative district of Gmina Tuchomie, within Bytów County, Pomeranian Voivodeship, in northern Poland. It lies approximately 7 kilometres (4 mi) south-west of Tuchomie, 17 km (11 mi) south-west of Bytów, and 95 km (59 mi) west of the regional capital Gdańsk.

For details of the history of the region, see History of Pomerania.
