= Piaszno Małe =

- Settlement
- Location within Poland
- Coordinates: 54°5′31″N 17°21′3″E
- Country: Poland
- Voivodeship: Pomeranian
- County: Bytów
- Gmina: Tuchomie

Piaszno Małe [ˈpjaʂnɔ ˈmawɛ] is a settlement in the administrative district of Gmina Tuchomie, within Bytów County, Pomeranian Voivodeship, in northern Poland. It lies approximately 3 kilometres (2 mi) south of Tuchomie, 11 km (7 mi) south-west of Bytów, and 89 km (55 mi) west of the regional capital Gdańsk.

For details of the history of the region, see History of Pomerania.
