= Chocimierz =

- Settlement
- Location within Poland
- Coordinates: 54°6′14″N 17°19′29″E
- Country: Poland
- Voivodeship: Pomeranian
- County: Bytów
- Gmina: Tuchomie

Chocimierz [xɔˈt͡ɕimjɛʂ] is a settlement in the administrative district of Gmina Tuchomie, within Bytów County, Pomeranian Voivodeship, in northern Poland. It lies approximately 2 kilometres (1 mi) south-west of Tuchomie, 12 km (7 mi) west of Bytów, and 90 km (56 mi) west of the regional capital Gdańsk.

For details of the history of the region, see History of Pomerania.
