= Kashubian Unity Day =

Annual festival celebrated by Kashubs

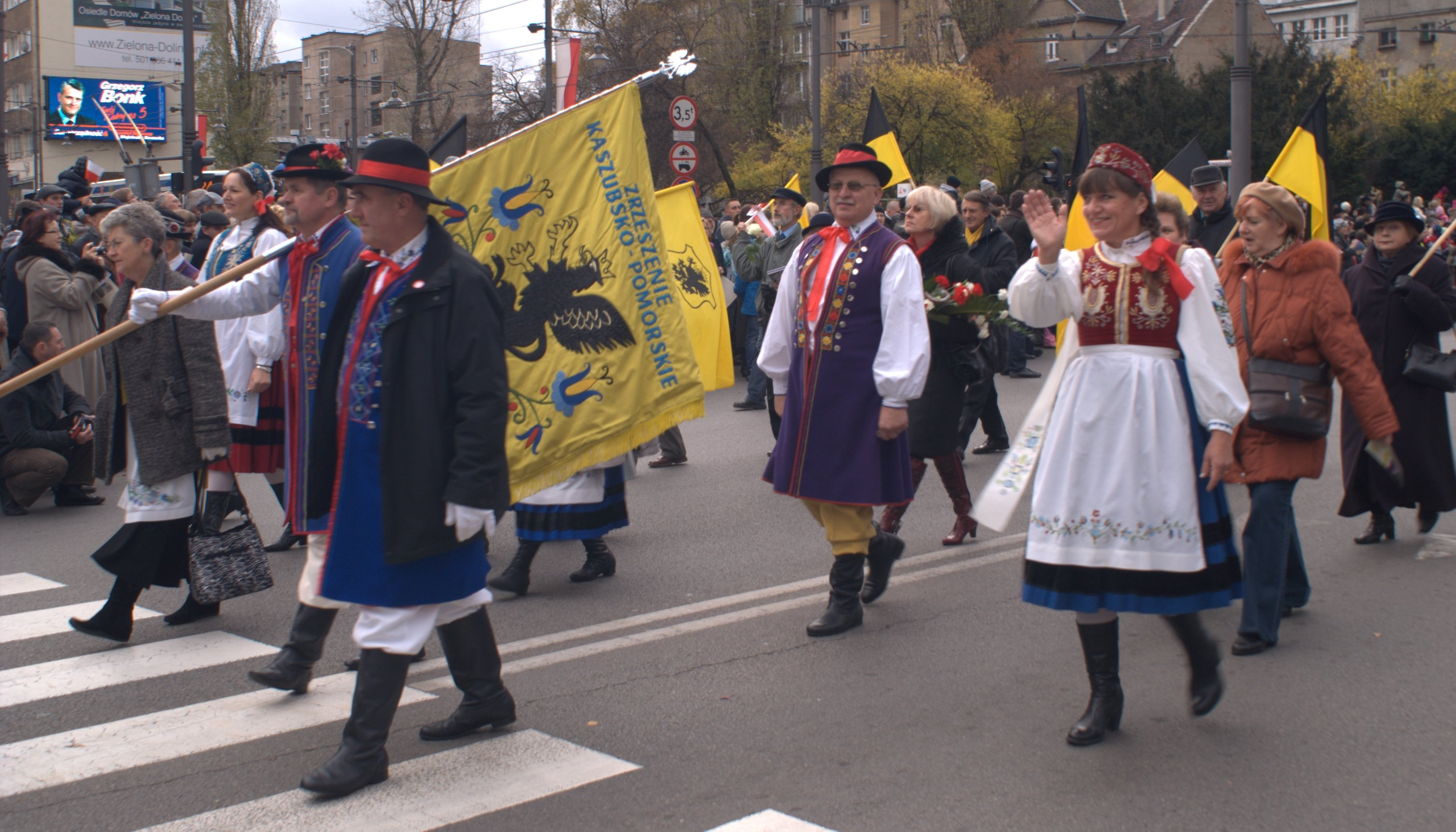

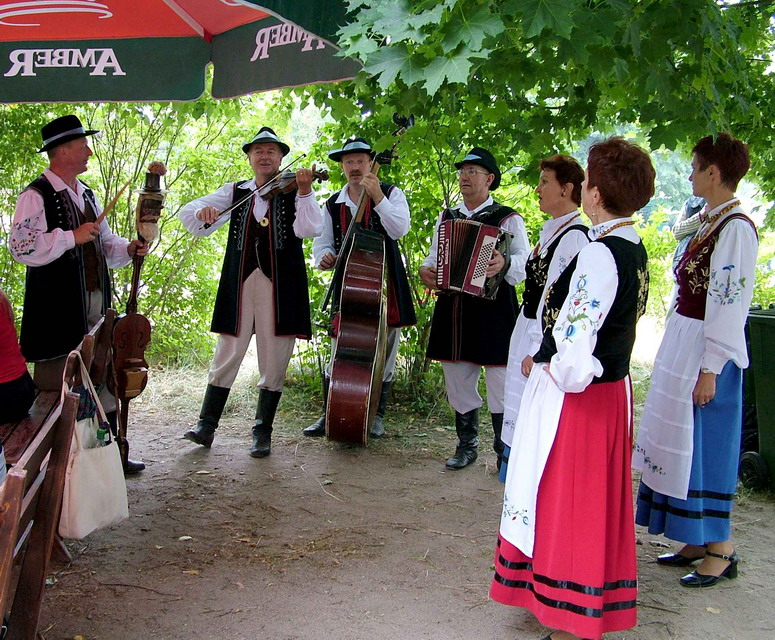
Kashubian Ethnic Park at Wdzydze Kiszewskie

Kashubian Unity Day (Kashubian: Dzéń Jednotë Kaszëbów, Polish: Dzień Jedności Kaszubów) is an annual festival celebrated every March 19 to commemorate the first historical written mention of Kashubians, in Pope Gregory IX's Bull of 19 March 1238. In this bull, the Pope referred to Prince Bogislaw I of Pomerania (d. 1187) as duce Cassubie (duke of Kashubia).

Sponsored and coordinated by the Kashubian-Pomeranian Association, the annual Kashubian Unity Day is designed to promote Kashubian culture. It includes folk art fairs, exhibitions, crafts, and a tournament of the traditional Kashubian card game, "Baśka." Another, newer, feature is the competition to better the world record for the number of people simultaneously playing the accordion. Kashubian Unity Day is also noted for its use of social media to promote the event, and its Facebook page is a very useful source for both festival information and news pertaining to Kashubian life and culture.

Kashubian Unity Day has been held in the following locations:

- 2005: Gdańsk
- 2006: Tuchomie
- 2007: Kramarzyny
- 2008: Miastko
- 2009: Bytów
- 2010: Kartuzy
- 2011: Słupsk
- 2012: Brusy
- 2013: Kościerzyna
- 2014: Sierakowice
- 2015: Sulęczyno
- 2016: Bojano
- 2017: Chmielno
- 2018: Kosakowo

== See also ==
- World Congress of Kashubians in summer.
