= Kleszczewo =

Kleszczewo may refer to the following places:

- Kleszczewo, Leszno County in Greater Poland Voivodeship (west-central Poland)
- Kleszczewo, Poznań County in Greater Poland Voivodeship (west-central Poland)
- Kleszczewo, Lubusz Voivodeship (west Poland)
- Kleszczewo, Bytów County in Pomeranian Voivodeship (north Poland)
- Kleszczewo, Gdańsk County in Pomeranian Voivodeship (north Poland)
- Kleszczewo, Giżycko County in Warmian-Masurian Voivodeship (north Poland)
- Kleszczewo, Olecko County in Warmian-Masurian Voivodeship (north Poland)
- Kleszczewo, Choszczno County in West Pomeranian Voivodeship (north-west Poland)
