= Tuchomie railway station =

Railway station in Tuchomie, Poland

Coordinates: 54.1161°N 17.3317°E

Tuchomie

General information
- Location: Tuchomie; Poland
- Owner: Polskie Koleje Państwowe S.A.
- Platforms: 2

Construction
- Structure type: Building: Yes (no longer used); Depot: Never existed Water tower: Never existed

History
- Former names: Groß Tuchen until 1945
Location

Tuchomie is a non-operational PKP railway station in Tuchomie (Pomeranian Voivodeship), Poland.

== Lines crossing the station ==
Start station	End station	Line type
Bytów	Miastko	Closed
