= Cetyń =

- Village
- Location within Poland
- Coordinates: 54°13′24″N 17°9′11″E
- Country: Poland
- Voivodeship: Pomeranian
- County: Bytów
- Gmina: Trzebielino
- Population: 373

Cetyń [ˈt͡sɛtɨɲ] (German: Zettin) is a village in the administrative district of Gmina Trzebielino, within Bytów County, Pomeranian Voivodeship, in northern Poland.
