= Piaszno, Pomeranian Voivodeship =

Piaszno
- Village
- Location within Poland
- Coordinates: 54°5′46″N 17°21′57″E
- Country: Poland
- Voivodeship: Pomeranian
- County: Bytów
- Gmina: Tuchomie

Population
  - Total: 154
- Postal code: 77-133
- Website: http://www.tuchomie.pl/piaszno/index.html

Piaszno [ˈpjaʂnɔ] (Kashubian: Piôszno) is a village in the administrative district of Gmina Tuchomie, within Bytów County, Pomeranian Voivodeship, in northern Poland.
