= Trzebiatkowa =

- Village
- Location within Poland
- Coordinates: 54°3′51″N 17°18′7″E
- Country: Poland
- Voivodeship: Pomeranian
- County: Bytów
- Gmina: Tuchomie
- Population: 475

Trzebiatkowa [tʂɛbjatˈkɔva] (German: Radensfelde, Kashubian: Trzebiôtkòwa) is a village in the administrative district of Gmina Tuchomie, within Bytów County, Pomeranian Voivodeship, in northern Poland.

== Notable residents ==
- Hans von Greiffenberg (1893-1951), Wehrmacht general
