= Osieki, Bytów County =

Osieki
- Village
- Location within Poland
- Coordinates: 54°13′39″N 17°24′14″E
- Country: Poland
- Voivodeship: Pomeranian
- County: Bytów
- Gmina: Borzytuchom
- Population: 280

Osieki [ɔˈɕɛki] is a village in the administrative district of Gmina Borzytuchom, within Bytów County, Pomeranian Voivodeship, in northern Poland.

== History ==
Formerly, the village was divided into Osieki Królewskie and Osieki Szlacheckie. In the years 1975–1998, the village was located in the Słupsk Voivodeship.

Leszek Pękalski ( The Vampire from Bytów ) comes from the village.
