= Radaczewo, Bytów County =

Radaczewo
- Village
- Location within Poland
- Coordinates: 54°16′16″N 17°01′53″E
- Country: Poland
- Voivodeship: Pomeranian
- County: Bytów
- Gmina: Trzebielino

Radaczewo [radaˈt͡ʂɛvɔ] is a village in the administrative district of Gmina Trzebielino, within Bytów County, Pomeranian Voivodeship, in northern Poland.

For details of the history of the region, see History of Pomerania.
