= Czarnkowo, Bytów County =

Czarnkowo
- Settlement
- Location within Poland
- Coordinates: 54°5′49″N 17°5′22″E
- Country: Poland
- Voivodeship: Pomeranian
- County: Bytów
- Gmina: Trzebielino
- Population: 8

Czarnkowo [t͡ʂarnˈkɔvɔ] is a settlement in the administrative district of Gmina Trzebielino, within Bytów County, Pomeranian Voivodeship, in northern Poland.

For details of the history of the region, see History of Pomerania.
