= Zielin Górny =

- Settlement
- Location within Poland
- Coordinates: 54°16′6″N 17°6′5″E
- Country: Poland
- Voivodeship: Pomeranian
- County: Bytów
- Gmina: Trzebielino

Zielin Górny [ˈʑɛlin ˈɡurnɨ] is a settlement in the administrative district of Gmina Trzebielino, within Bytów County, Pomeranian Voivodeship, in northern Poland.

For details of the history of the region, see History of Pomerania.
