= Objezierze =

Objezierze may refer to the following places:

- Objezierze, Greater Poland Voivodeship (west-central Poland)
- Objezierze, Bytów County in Pomeranian Voivodeship (north Poland)
- Objezierze, Chojnice County in Pomeranian Voivodeship (north Poland)
- Objezierze, West Pomeranian Voivodeship (north-west Poland)
