= Kamieńc =

- Settlement
- Location within Poland
- Coordinates: 54°13′54″N 17°16′30″E
- Country: Poland
- Voivodeship: Pomeranian
- County: Bytów
- Gmina: Borzytuchom
- Population: 0

Kamieńc [ˈkamjɛɲt͡s] is a former settlement in the administrative district of Gmina Borzytuchom, within Bytów County, Pomeranian Voivodeship, in northern Poland.
