= Uliszkowice =

- Village
- Location within Poland
- Coordinates: 54°16′24″N 17°7′24″E
- Country: Poland
- Voivodeship: Pomeranian
- County: Bytów
- Gmina: Trzebielino
- Population: 28

Uliszkowice [uliʂkɔˈvit͡sɛ] (German: Augustfelde) is a village in the administrative district of Gmina Trzebielino, within Bytów County, Pomeranian Voivodeship, in northern Poland.

== See also ==
- History of Pomerania
