= Bożanka =

- Village
- Location within Poland
- Coordinates: 54°8′26″N 17°2′6″E
- Country: Poland
- Voivodeship: Pomeranian
- County: Bytów
- Gmina: Trzebielino
- Population: 81

Bożanka [bɔˈʐanka] is a village in the administrative district of Gmina Trzebielino, within Bytów County, Pomeranian Voivodeship, in northern Poland.
