= Kandarr =

Kandarr is a surname. Notable people with the surname include:

- Jana Kandarr (born 1976), German tennis player
- Petra Kandarr (1950–2017), East German sprinter
