= Struszewo =

- Village
- Location within Poland
- Coordinates: 54°10′50″N 17°21′44″E
- Country: Poland
- Voivodeship: Pomeranian
- County: Bytów
- Gmina: Borzytuchom
- Population: 173

Struszewo [struˈʂɛvɔ] is a village in the administrative district of Gmina Borzytuchom, within Bytów County, Pomeranian Voivodeship, in northern Poland.
