= Popielewo =

Popielewo may refer to the following places:

- Popielewo, Gniezno County in Greater Poland Voivodeship (west-central Poland)
- Popielewo, Konin County in Greater Poland Voivodeship (west-central Poland)
- Popielewo, Kuyavian-Pomeranian Voivodeship (north-central Poland)
- Popielewo, Bytów County in Pomeranian Voivodeship (north Poland)
- Popielewo, Chojnice County in Pomeranian Voivodeship (north Poland)
- Popielewo, Police County in West Pomeranian Voivodeship (north-west Poland)
- Popielewo, Świdwin County in West Pomeranian Voivodeship (north-west Poland)
