= Starkówko =

- Village
- Location within Poland
- Coordinates: 54°15′40″N 17°9′18″E
- Country: Poland
- Voivodeship: Pomeranian
- County: Bytów
- Gmina: Trzebielino
- Population: 45

Starkówko [starˈkufkɔ] is a village in the administrative district of Gmina Trzebielino, within Bytów County, Pomeranian Voivodeship, in northern Poland.

For details of the history of the region, see History of Pomerania.

== Notable people ==
- Stanisław Wagner (born 1947 in Starkówko) a Polish former sprinter who competed in the 1972 Summer Olympics
