= Ciemno, Pomeranian Voivodeship =

Ciemno
- Village
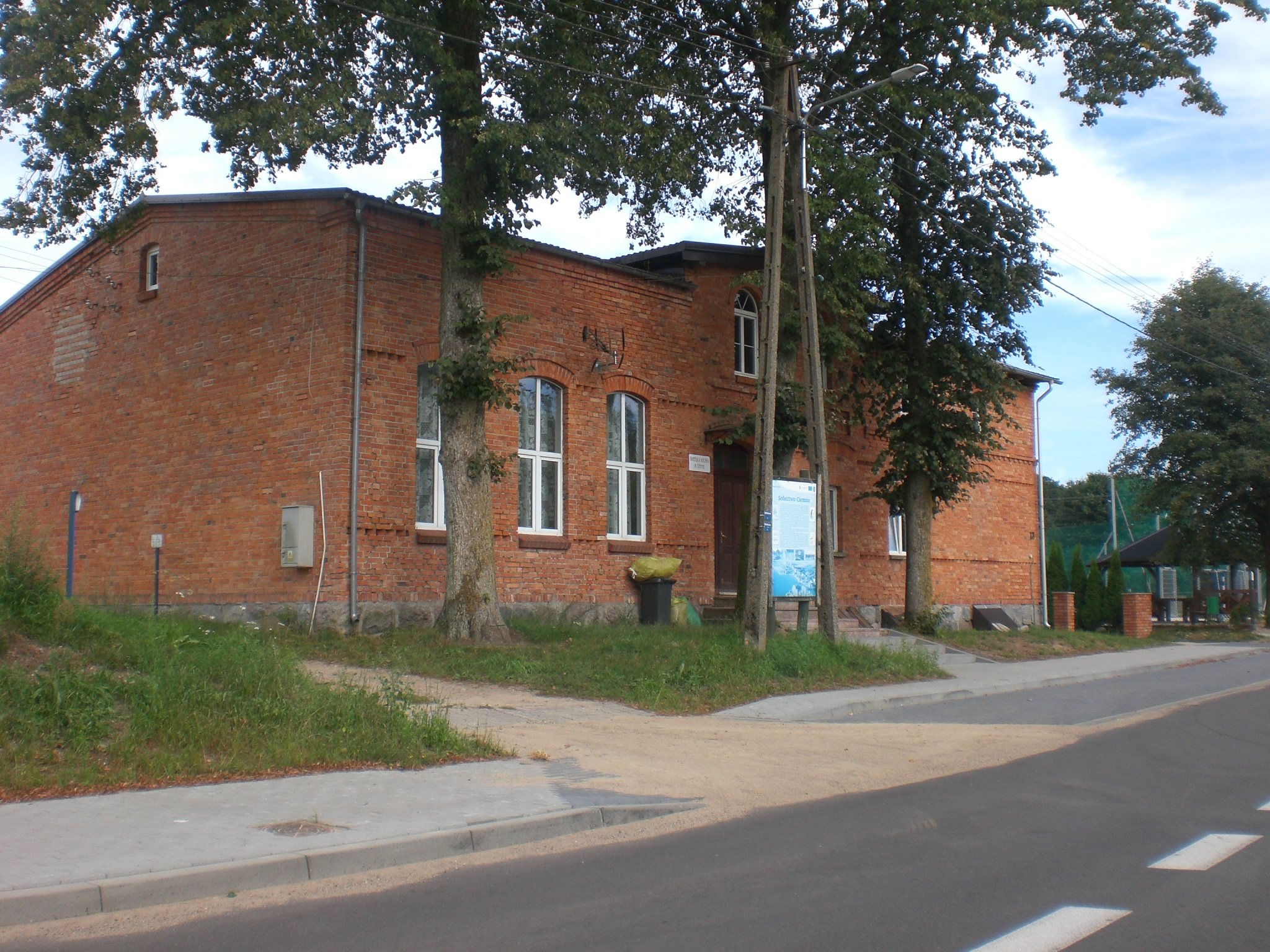

- Location within Poland
- Coordinates: 54°4′49″N 17°20′36″E
- Country: Poland
- Voivodeship: Pomeranian
- County: Bytów
- Gmina: Tuchomie

Population
  - Total: 203
- Postal code: 77-134

Ciemno [ˈt͡ɕɛmnɔ] (German: Zemmen, Kashubian: Cémno) is a village in the administrative district of Gmina Tuchomie, within Bytów County, Pomeranian Voivodeship, in northern Poland.

Historically, it was known in Polish as Ciemno and Ciemne.
