= Owczary, Bytów County =

Owczary
- Settlement
- Location within Poland
- Coordinates: 54°12′50″N 17°10′33″E
- Country: Poland
- Voivodeship: Pomeranian
- County: Bytów
- Gmina: Trzebielino
- Population: 26

Owczary [ɔfˈt͡ʂarɨ] is a settlement in the administrative district of Gmina Trzebielino, within Bytów County, Pomeranian Voivodeship, in northern Poland.

For details of the history of the region, see History of Pomerania.
