= Wargoszewo =

- Settlement
- Location within Poland
- Coordinates: 54°14′3″N 17°10′24″E
- Country: Poland
- Voivodeship: Pomeranian
- County: Bytów
- Gmina: Trzebielino

Wargoszewo [varɡɔˈʂɛvɔ] is a settlement in the administrative district of Gmina Trzebielino, within Bytów County, Pomeranian Voivodeship, in northern Poland.

For details of the history of the region, see History of Pomerania.
