= Dąbrówka, Bytów County =

Dąbrówka
- Village
- Location within Poland
- Coordinates: 54°9′52″N 17°23′59″E
- Country: Poland
- Voivodeship: Pomeranian
- County: Bytów
- Gmina: Borzytuchom
- Population: 525

Dąbrówka [dɔmˈbrufka] is a village in the administrative district of Gmina Borzytuchom, within Bytów County, Pomeranian Voivodeship, in northern Poland.
