= Bąkowo, Bytów County =

Bąkowo
- Village
- Location within Poland
- Coordinates: 54°11′38″N 17°3′6″E
- Country: Poland
- Voivodeship: Pomeranian
- County: Bytów
- Gmina: Trzebielino
- Population: 22

Bąkowo [bɔnˈkɔvɔ] is a village in the administrative district of Gmina Trzebielino, within Bytów County, Pomeranian Voivodeship, in northern Poland.
