= Glewnik =

- Village
- Location within Poland
- Coordinates: 54°12′59″N 17°3′37″E
- Country: Poland
- Voivodeship: Pomeranian
- County: Bytów
- Gmina: Trzebielino
- Population: 23

Glewnik [ˈɡlɛvnik] is a village in the administrative district of Gmina Trzebielino, within Bytów County, Pomeranian Voivodeship, in northern Poland.

For details of the history of the region, see History of Pomerania.
