= Ryczyn =

- Village
- Location within Poland
- Coordinates: 54°13′16″N 17°18′51″E
- Country: Poland
- Voivodeship: Pomeranian
- County: Bytów
- Gmina: Borzytuchom

Ryczyn [ˈrɨt͡ʂɨn] is a village in the administrative district of Gmina Borzytuchom, within Bytów County, Pomeranian Voivodeship, in northern Poland.
