= Chotkowo =

- Village
- Location within Poland
- Coordinates: 54°9′43″N 17°20′55″E
- Country: Poland
- Voivodeship: Pomeranian
- County: Bytów
- Gmina: Borzytuchom
- Population: 219

Chotkowo [xɔtˈkɔvɔ] is a village in the administrative district of Gmina Borzytuchom, within Bytów County, Pomeranian Voivodeship, in northern Poland.

== See also ==
- History of Pomerania
