= Jutrzenka, Pomeranian Voivodeship =

Jutrzenka
- Village
- Location within Poland
- Coordinates: 54°12′20″N 17°19′48″E
- Country: Poland
- Voivodeship: Pomeranian
- County: Bytów
- Gmina: Borzytuchom
- Population: 220

Jutrzenka [juˈtʂɛnka] (German: Morgenstern) is a village in the administrative district of Gmina Borzytuchom, within Bytów County, Pomeranian Voivodeship, in northern Poland.
