= Masłowice Tuchomskie =

- Village
- Location within Poland
- Coordinates: 54°5′59″N 17°16′57″E
- Country: Poland
- Voivodeship: Pomeranian
- County: Bytów
- Gmina: Tuchomie
- Population: 143

Masłowice Tuchomskie [maswɔˈvit͡sɛ tuˈxɔmskʲɛ] (German: Groß Massowitz) is a village in the administrative district of Gmina Tuchomie, within Bytów County, Pomeranian Voivodeship, in northern Poland. For details of the history of the region, see History of Pomerania.
