= Niedarzyno =

- Village
- Location within Poland
- Coordinates: 54°13′13″N 17°25′24″E
- Country: Poland
- Voivodeship: Pomeranian
- County: Bytów
- Gmina: Borzytuchom
- Population: 253

Niedarzyno [ɲɛdaˈʐɨnɔ] is a village in the administrative district of Gmina Borzytuchom, within Bytów County, Pomeranian Voivodeship, in northern Poland.
