= Tuchomko railway station =

Railway station in Tuchomko, Poland

Coordinates: 54.1322°N 17.3683°E

Tuchomko

General information
- Location: Tuchomko; Poland
- Owner: Polskie Koleje Państwowe S.A.

Construction
- Structure type: Building: No; Depot: Never existed Water tower: Never existed

History
- Former names: Klein Tuchen until 1945
Location

Tuchomko is a non-operational PKP railway station in Tuchomko (Pomeranian Voivodeship), Poland.

== Lines crossing the station ==
Start station	End station	Line type
Bytów	Miastko	Closed
