= Toczek, Pomeranian Voivodeship =

Toczek
- Settlement
- Location within Poland
- Coordinates: 54°11′43″N 17°8′28″E
- Country: Poland
- Voivodeship: Pomeranian
- County: Bytów
- Gmina: Trzebielino
- Population: 3

Toczek [ˈtɔt͡ʂɛk] is a settlement in the administrative district of Gmina Trzebielino, within Bytów County, Pomeranian Voivodeship, in northern Poland.

For details of the history of the region, see History of Pomerania.
