= 1972 European Athletics Indoor Championships – Women's 4 × 180 metres relay =

The women's 4 × 180 metres relay event at the 1972 European Athletics Indoor Championships was held on 11 March in Grenoble. Each athlete ran one lap of the 180 metres track.

== Results ==
Rank	Nation	Competitors	Time	Notes
1st place, gold medalist(s)	West Germany	Elfgard Schittenhelm; Christine Tackenberg; Annegret Kroniger; Rita Wilden	1:24.1	
2nd place, silver medalist(s)	France	Michèle Beugnet; Christiane Marlet; Claudine Meire; Nicole Pani	1:27.6	
3rd place, bronze medalist(s)	Austria	Christa Kepplinger; Maria Sykora; Carmen Mähr; Monika Holzschuster	1:29.5	
