= Pękalski =

Pękalski (feminine: Pękalska; plural: Pękalscy) is a Polish surname. It occasionally appears as Penkalski to indicate its pronunciation. Notable people with the surname include:

- Ivo Pękalski (born 1990), Swedish footballer
- Leszek Pękalski (born 1966), Polish serial killer
