= Moczydło, Pomeranian Voivodeship =

Moczydło
- Village
- Location within Poland
- Coordinates: 54°17′27″N 17°5′12″E
- Country: Poland
- Voivodeship: Pomeranian
- County: Bytów
- Gmina: Trzebielino
- Population: 37

Moczydło [mɔˈt͡ʂɨdwɔ] (German: Mudschiddel) is a village in the administrative district of Gmina Trzebielino, within Bytów County, Pomeranian Voivodeship, in northern Poland.

For details of the history of the region, see History of Pomerania.
