= 1969 European Athletics Championships – Women's 100 metres =

Women's 100 metres at the 1969 European Athletics Championships
- Venue: Georgios Karaiskakis Stadium
- Location: Athens
- Dates: 17 September
- Competitors: 24 from 16 nations
- Winning time: 11.66

Medalists
| gold medal | Petra Vogt | East Germany |
| silver medal | Wilma van den Berg | Netherlands |
| bronze medal | Anita Neil | Great Britain |

The women's 100 metres at the 1969 European Athletics Championships was held in Athens, Greece, at Georgios Karaiskakis Stadium on 17 September 1969.

== Participation ==
According to an unofficial count, 24 athletes from 16 countries participated in the event.

- Austria (1)
- Belgium (1)
- Bulgaria (1)
- Czechoslovakia (1)
- East Germany (3)
- Denmark (1)
- Finland (1)
- France (2)
- Iceland (1)
- Luxembourg (1)
- Netherlands (1)
- Poland (2)
- Romania (1)
- Soviet Union (3)
- Sweden (1)
- Great Britain (3)

== Results ==
=== Heats ===
17 September

==== Heat 1 ====
Wind: -3.1 m/s

| Rank | Name | Nationality | Time | Notes |
|---|---|---|---|---|
| 1 | Karin Balzer | East Germany | 11.9 | Q |
| 2 | Else Hadrup | Denmark | 12.0 | Q |
| 3 | Mirosława Sarna | Poland | 12.0 | Q |
| 4 | Mariana Goth | Romania | 12.2 | Q |
| 5 | Anne Van Rensbergen | Belgium | 12.2 | |
| 6 | Ivanka Venkova | Bulgaria | 12.6 | |
| | | | Wind: -3.1 m/s | |

==== Heat 2 ====
| Rank | Name | Nationality | Time | Notes |
|---|---|---|---|---|
| 1 | Petra Vogt | East Germany | 11.6 | Q |
| 2 | Anita Neil | Great Britain | 11.9 | Q |
| 3 | Danuta Jędrejek | Poland | 12.1 | Q |
| 4 | Galina Mitrokhina | Soviet Union | 12.2 | Q |
| 5 | Dominique Descatoire | France | 12.7 | |
| 6 | Annette Berger | Luxembourg | 12.9 | |
| 7 | Kristín Jónsdóttir | Iceland | 13.3 | |
| | | | Wind: -2.8 m/s | |

==== Heat 3 ====
| Rank | Name | Nationality | Time | Notes |
|---|---|---|---|---|
| 1 | Val Peat | Great Britain | 12.0 | Q |
| 2 | Regina Höfer | East Germany | 12.1 | Q |
| 3 | Eva Glesková | Czechoslovakia | 12.2 | Q |
| 4 | Nadezhda Besfamilnaya | Soviet Union | 12.3 | Q |
| 5 | Mona-Lisa Strandvall | Finland | 12.4 | |
| | | | Wind: -3.5 m/s | |

==== Heat 4 ====
| Rank | Name | Nationality | Time | Notes |
|---|---|---|---|---|
| 1 | Wilma van den Berg | Netherlands | 11.9 | Q |
| 2 | Sylviane Telliez | France | 12.0 | Q |
| 3 | Lyudmila Mikhailova | Soviet Union | 12.2 | Q |
| 4 | Madeleine Cobb | Great Britain | 12.2 | Q |
| 5 | Erika Kren | Austria | 12.4 | |
| 6 | Gun Olsson | Sweden | 12.6 | |
| | | | Wind: -2.0 m/s | |

=== Semi-finals ===
17 September

==== Semi-final 1 ====
| Rank | Name | Nationality | Time | Notes |
|---|---|---|---|---|
| 1 | Petra Vogt | East Germany | 11.7 | Q |
| 2 | Anita Neil | Great Britain | 11.7 | Q |
| 3 | Sylviane Telliez | France | 11.8 | Q |
| 4 | Regina Höfer | East Germany | 11.9 | Q |
| 5 | Mirosława Sarna | Poland | 12.0 | |
| 6 | Nadezhda Besfamilnaya | Soviet Union | 12.0 | |
| 7 | Lyudmila Mikhailova | Soviet Union | 12.2 | |
| | Mariana Goth | Romania | DNS | |
| | | | Wind: -1.3 m/s | |

==== Semi-final 2 ====
| Rank | Name | Nationality | Time | Notes |
|---|---|---|---|---|
| 1 | Wilma van den Berg | Netherlands | 11.7 | Q |
| 2 | Karin Balzer | East Germany | 11.8 | Q |
| 3 | Val Peat | Great Britain | 11.9 | Q |
| 4 | Eva Glesková | Czechoslovakia | 11.9 | Q |
| 5 | Else Hadrup | Denmark | 12.0 | |
| 6 | Danuta Jędrejek | Poland | 12.1 | |
| 7 | Galina Mitrokhina | Soviet Union | 12.1 | |
| | Madeleine Cobb | Great Britain | DNS | |
| | | | Wind: -2.3 m/s | |

=== Final ===
17 September

| Rank | Name | Nationality | Time | Notes |
|---|---|---|---|---|
| 1st place, gold medalist(s) | Petra Vogt | East Germany | 11.66 | |
| 2nd place, silver medalist(s) | Wilma van den Berg | Netherlands | 11.74 | |
| 3rd place, bronze medalist(s) | Anita Neil | Great Britain | 11.81 | |
| 4 | Val Peat | Great Britain | 11.87 | |
| 5 | Karin Balzer | East Germany | 11.88 | |
| 6 | Regina Höfer | East Germany | 11.90 | |
| 7 | Eva Glesková | Czechoslovakia | 11.90 | |
| 8 | Sylviane Telliez | France | 11.92 | |
| | | | Wind: -0.4 m/s | |
