= Nowe Huty =

- Village
- Location within Poland
- Coordinates: 54°7′9″N 17°16′36″E
- Country: Poland
- Voivodeship: Pomeranian
- County: Bytów
- Gmina: Tuchomie
- Population: 79

Nowe Huty [ˈnɔvɛ ˈxutɨ] is a village in the administrative district of Gmina Tuchomie, within Bytów County, Pomeranian Voivodeship, in northern Poland.

For details of the history of the region, see History of Pomerania.
