= Dretyniec =

- Settlement
- Location within Poland
- Coordinates: 54°7′17″N 17°0′9″E
- Country: Poland
- Voivodeship: Pomeranian
- County: Bytów
- Gmina: Trzebielino
- Population: 0

Dretyniec [drɛˈtɨɲɛt͡s] is a former settlement in the administrative district of Gmina Trzebielino, within Bytów County, Pomeranian Voivodeship, in northern Poland.

For details of the history of the region, see History of Pomerania.
