= Starkowo =

Starkowo may refer to the following places:

- Starkowo, Greater Poland Voivodeship (west-central Poland)
- Starkowo, Bytów County in Pomeranian Voivodeship (north Poland)
- Starkowo, Słupsk County in Pomeranian Voivodeship (north Poland)
