= Kamienica, Bytów County =

Kamienica
- Village
- Location within Poland
- Coordinates: 54°12′39″N 17°16′50″E
- Country: Poland
- Voivodeship: Pomeranian
- County: Bytów
- Gmina: Borzytuchom

Kamienica [kamjɛˈnit͡sa] is a village in the administrative district of Gmina Borzytuchom, within Bytów County, Pomeranian Voivodeship, in northern Poland.
