= Jabłoniec =

Jabłoniec may refer to the following places in Poland:

- Jabłoniec, Lower Silesian Voivodeship (south-west Poland)
- Jabłoniec, Lubusz Voivodeship (west Poland)
- Jabłoniec, Bytów County in Pomeranian Voivodeship (north Poland)
- Jabłoniec, Słupsk County in Pomeranian Voivodeship (north Poland)
