= Borzytuchom railway station =

Railway station in Borzytuchom, Poland

Coordinates: 54.1940°N 17.3557°E

Borzytuchom

General information
- Location: Borzytuchom; Poland
- Owner: Polskie Koleje Państwowe S.A.

Construction
- Structure type: Building: No; Depot: No; Water tower: No

History
- Former names: Borntuchen until 1945
Location

Borzytuchom is a non-operational PKP railway station in Borzytuchom (Pomeranian Voivodeship), Poland.

== Lines crossing the station ==
Start station	End station	Line type
Lipusz	Korzybie	Closed
