= Masłowice Trzebiatkowskie =

- Village
- Location within Poland
- Coordinates: 54°5′27″N 17°17′38″E
- Country: Poland
- Voivodeship: Pomeranian
- County: Bytów
- Gmina: Tuchomie
- Population: 60

Masłowice Trzebiatkowskie [maswɔˈvit͡sɛ tʂɛbjatˈkɔfskʲɛ] (Cashubian Trzebiôtkòwsczé Masłowice) is a village in the administrative district of Gmina Tuchomie, within Bytów County, Pomeranian Voivodeship, in northern Poland.
