= Gumieniec railway station =

Railway station in Poland

Gumieniec

General information
- Location: Gumieniec; Poland
- Coordinates: 54.251251°N 17.033159°E
- Owner: Polskie Koleje Państwowe S.A.
- Platforms: 1

Construction
- Structure type: Building: Yes (no longer used); Depot: Never existed Water tower: Never existed

History
- Former names: Gumenz until 1945
Location

Gumieniec is a non-operational PKP railway station in Gumieniec (Pomeranian Voivodeship), Poland.

== Lines crossing the station ==
Start station	End station	Line type
Lipusz	Korzybie	Closed
