= Modrzejewo, Gmina Tuchomie =

Modrzejewo
- Village
- Location within Poland
- Coordinates: 54°8′51″N 17°19′8″E
- Country: Poland
- Voivodeship: Pomeranian
- County: Bytów
- Gmina: Tuchomie
- Population: 386

Modrzejewo (Kashubian: Mòdrzewò) is a village in the administrative district of Gmina Tuchomie, within Bytów County, Pomeranian Voivodeship, in northern Poland.
