= Zielin, Pomeranian Voivodeship =

Zielin
- Village
- Location within Poland
- Coordinates: 54°14′47″N 17°6′5″E
- Country: Poland
- Voivodeship: Pomeranian
- County: Bytów
- Gmina: Trzebielino
- Population: 484

Zielin [ˈʑɛlin] is a village in the administrative district of Gmina Trzebielino, within Bytów County, Pomeranian Voivodeship, in northern Poland.
