= Suchorze =

- Village
- Location within Poland
- Coordinates: 54°16′30″N 17°5′58″E
- Country: Poland
- Voivodeship: Pomeranian
- County: Bytów
- Gmina: Trzebielino
- Population: 664

Suchorze [suˈxɔʐɛ] is a village in the administrative district of Gmina Trzebielino, within Bytów County, Pomeranian Voivodeship, in northern Poland.

For details of the history of the region, see History of Pomerania.

Unlike in most places in the new Polish territories, local Germans could to stay after 1945 because they were obliged to work on state farms. During the 1950s, a German-language village school operated here.
