= Krosnowo =

- Village
- Location within Poland
- Coordinates: 54°14′21″N 17°21′32″E
- Country: Poland
- Voivodeship: Pomeranian
- County: Bytów
- Gmina: Borzytuchom
- Population: 204

Krosnowo [krɔsˈnɔvɔ] is a village in the administrative district of Gmina Borzytuchom, within Bytów County, Pomeranian Voivodeship, in northern Poland.
