= Objezierze, Bytów County =

Objezierze
- Village
- Location within Poland
- Coordinates: 54°18′0″N 17°3′57″E
- Country: Poland
- Voivodeship: Pomeranian
- County: Bytów
- Gmina: Trzebielino
- Population: 225

Objezierze [ɔbjɛˈʑɛʐɛ] (German: Wobeser) is a village in the administrative district of Gmina Trzebielino, within Bytów County, Pomeranian Voivodeship, in northern Poland.

For details of the history of the region, see History of Pomerania.

The local church was used by German-speaking Lutherans until 1972, when the catholic priest illegally exchanged the doorlocks and took over the church for the Catholics.
