= Dean Sampson =

Great Britain and England international rugby league footballer (born 1967)

Personal information
- Full name: Dean Sampson
- Born: 27 June 1967 (age 58) Stanley Wakefield, England

Playing information
- Height: 6 ft 0 in (1.83 m)
- Position: Prop
Club
Years	Team	Pld	T	G	FG	P
1987–02	Castleford	426	68	0	0	272
1990	Gold Coast Seagulls	8	0	0	0	0
1995	Parramatta Eels	6	2	0	0	8
2003	Castleford Tigers	4	1	0	0	4
2004	Hunslet Hawks	6	0	0	0	0
2005	Castleford Tigers	1	0	0	0	0
	Total	451	71	0	0	284
Representative
Years	Team	Pld	T	G	FG	P
1995–99	England	5	3	0	0	12
1997	Great Britain	1	0	0	0	0
- Father: Dave Sampson
- Relatives: Malcolm Sampson (uncle); Denise Ramsden (cousin); Paul Sampson (cousin)

Dean Sampson (born 27 June 1967) is an English former professional rugby league footballer who played as a prop, and spent the majority of his professional career at the Castleford Tigers, with spells in Australia for Gold Coast and the Parramatta Eels. Sampson made over 400 appearances for Castleford (Tigers) between 1987 and 2005. He also represented England and Great Britain at international level, and was selected to go on the 1992 Great Britain Lions tour of Australia and New Zealand.

== Background ==
Sampson was born in Wakefield, West Riding of Yorkshire, England.

== Playing career ==
=== Castleford ===
Sampson started his career at Stanley Rangers before joining Castleford in 1986, and made his first team début in 1987.

During the 1987–88 season, Sampson appeared as a substitute (replacing hooker Kevin Beardmore) in Castleford's 12–12 draw with Bradford Northern in the 1987 Yorkshire Cup Final at Headingley, Leeds on Saturday 17 October 1987, and appeared as a substitute (replacing prop John Fifita) in the 2–11 defeat by Bradford Northern in the replay at Elland Road, Leeds on Saturday 31 October 1987.

Sampson appeared as a substitute (replacing interchange/substitute David Roockley) in the 12–33 defeat by Leeds in the 1988 Yorkshire Cup Final during the 1988–89 season at Elland Road, Leeds on Sunday 16 October 1988, and played prop in the 11–8 victory over Wakefield Trinity in the 1990 Yorkshire Cup Final during the 1990–91 season at Elland Road, Leeds on Sunday 23 September 1990.

Sampson was a substitute (replacing prop Lee Crooks on 33-minutes) in Castleford's 12–28 defeat by Wigan in the 1992 Challenge Cup Final during the 1991–92 season at Wembley Stadium, London on Saturday 2 May 1992, in front of a crowd of 77,386.

Sampson appeared as a substitute (replacing prop Martin Ketteridge on 74-minutes) in Castleford's 33–2 victory over Wigan in the 1993–94 Regal Trophy Final during the 1993–94 season at Headingley, Leeds on Saturday 22 January 1994.

Sampson initially retired from playing at the end of the 2002 season, but came back in 2003 when Castleford Tigers went through an injury crisis, scoring on his comeback game against Warrington Wolves. In 2004, he spent time playing for Hunslet Hawks in National League Two.

He played once more for Castleford Tigers in 2005 against Hull Dockers in the Challenge Cup. Overall Sampson played 431 games for Castleford scoring 68 tries. With 431-appearances, Sampson is joint second (along with Artie Atkinson) in Castleford's all-time appearance list behind John Joyner, who has 613-appearances. Sampson was a real fans favourite for Castleford and his name was often chanted by the home fans.

=== International honours ===
Sampson played at prop in Great Britain's 14–8 victory over Auckland on the 1992 Great Britain Lions tour of Australasia at Carlaw Park, Parnell, New Zealand on Wednesday 8 July 1992, and played at prop in Great Britain's 17–6 victory over Canterbury on the 1992 Great Britain Lions tour of Australasia at Rugby League Park/Addington Showgrounds, Christchurch on Wednesday 15 July 1992.

In the 1997 post season, Sampson was selected to play for Great Britain in the first match of the Super League Test series against Australia.

Sampson won caps for England while at Castleford in the 1995 Rugby League World Cup against Fiji, South Africa (interchange/substitute), and Wales (interchange/substitute), and in 1999 against France (two occasions).

== Coaching career ==
After retirement, Sampson became the club's academy coach and won the Junior academy championship in 2004. He left the club in May 2005, and moved to Hull Kingston Rovers and became the assistant coach there. Sampson left Hull Kingston Rovers after a brief period and stayed out of the game for a while.

Sampson rejoined Castleford for the 2009 Super League season, and was the club's academy coach once again.

== Honoured at Castleford Tigers ==
Sampson is a Tigers Hall of Fame Inductee.

== Genealogical information ==
Sampson is the son of the rugby league footballer, and coach; Dave Sampson and Mavis (née Dean), the nephew of the rugby league footballer; Malcolm Sampson, and the cousin of the sprinter; Denise Ramsden, and the rugby union, and rugby league footballer; Paul Sampson.
