= Gmina Trzebielino =

Gmina Trzebielino Trzebielino Commune
- Gmina
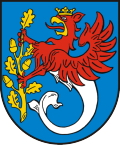
- Coat of arms
- Interactive map of Gmina Trzebielino
- Coordinates (Trzebielino): 54°12′2″N 17°5′15″E
- Country: Poland
- Voivodeship: Pomeranian
- County: Bytów
- Seat: Trzebielino

Area
  - Total: 225.45 km^{2} (87.05 sq mi)

Population (2006)
  - Total: 3,716
  - Density: 16.48/km^{2} (42.69/sq mi)
- Website: http://www.trzebielino.pl

Gmina Trzebielino is a rural gmina (administrative district) in Bytów County, Pomeranian Voivodeship, in northern Poland. Its seat is the village of Trzebielino, which lies approximately 28 kilometres (17 mi) west of Bytów and 103 km (64 mi) west of the regional capital Gdańsk.

The gmina covers an area of 225.45 square kilometres (87.0 sq mi), and as of 2006 its total population is 3,716.

== Villages ==
Gmina Trzebielino contains the villages and settlements of Bąkowo, Bożanka, Broczyna, Cetyń, Ciemnica, Czarnkowo, Dolno, Dretyniec, Glewnik, Grądki Dolne, Gumieniec, Kleszczewo, Miszewo, Moczydło, Myślimierz, Objezierze, Owczary, Poborowo, Popielewo, Radaczewo, Starkówko, Starkowo, Suchorze, Szczyciec, Toczek, Trzebielino, Uliszkowice, Wargoszewo, Zielin and Zielin Górny.

== Neighbouring gminas ==
Gmina Trzebielino is bordered by the gminas of Dębnica Kaszubska, Kępice, Kobylnica, Kołczygłowy and Miastko.
