= Christiane Marlet =

French athletics competitor (born 1954)

Personal information
- Nationality: French
- Born: 27 September 1954 (age 71) La Roche-sur-Yon

Sport
- Event: 100 m

Achievements and titles
- Regional finals: Indoor European Championships
Medal record
Women's athletics
Representing France
European Indoor Championships
Silver medal – second place	1972 Grenoble	4×180 m

Christiane Marlet (born 27 September 1954 at La Roche-sur-Yon) is a former French athlete, who specialised in the sprints.

== Biography ==
Appearing twice in French athletics teams, she won the silver medal relay 4 × 1 lap during the 1972 European Indoor Championships 1972 at Grenoble, alongside Michèle Beugnet, Claudine Meire and Nicole Pani.

=== prize list ===
International Awards
Date	Competition	Location	Result	Event
1972	European Indoor Championships	Grenoble	2nd	Relay 4 × 1 lap

=== Records ===
Personal records
Event	Performance	Location	Date
100 m	11 s 8		1971

== Sources ==
- DocAthlé 2003, French Athletics Federation, p. 419
