= Athletics at the 1970 Summer Universiade – Men's 10,000 metres =

The men's 10,000 metres event at the 1970 Summer Universiade was held at the Stadio Comunale in Turin on 2 September 1970.

== Results ==
Rank	Name	Nationality	Time	Notes
1st place, gold medalist(s)	Rashid Sharafetdinov	Soviet Union	29:02.2	
2nd place, silver medalist(s)	Jack Lane	Great Britain	29:08.8	
3rd place, bronze medalist(s)	Mike Tagg	Great Britain	29:22.2	
4	Donald Walsh	Ireland	29:31.6	
5	Ken-ichi Otsuki	Japan	29:42.2	
6	Giuseppe Ardizzone	Italy	29:52.0	
7	Julio Quevedo	Guatemala	30:06.8	
8	Dick Buerkle	United States	30:14.2	
9	Helmut Schu	West Germany	30:22.0	
10	Gyula Tóth	Hungary	30:24.6	
11	Bob Bertelsen	United States	30:25.6	
12	Giuseppe Cindolo	Italy	30:53.4	
13	Markku Salminen	Finland	30:54.6	
14	John Stanley	Australia	31:27.0	
15	Tilahun Asefa	Ethiopia	34:14.8	
	Jens Wollenberg	West Germany	DNF	
	Abdulrazik Salim	Sudan	DNF	
	René Goris	Belgium	DNF	
	Hans Müller	Austria	DNF	
