= Athletics at the 1973 Summer Universiade – Men's 10,000 metres =

The men's 10,000 metres event at the 1973 Summer Universiade was held at the Central Lenin Stadium in Moscow with the final on 16 August.

== Results ==
Rank	Athlete	Nationality	Time	Notes
1st place, gold medalist(s)	Dane Korica	Yugoslavia	28:48.90	UR
2nd place, silver medalist(s)	Norman Morrison	Great Britain	28:48.99	
3rd place, bronze medalist(s)	Patrick Kiingi	Kenya	28:50.80	
4	Richard Bowerman	United States	28:56.42	
5	Charles Maguire	United States	28:57.18	
6	Sergio González	Mexico	28:59.36	
7	Vadim Mochalov	Soviet Union	29:00.27	
8	Giuseppe Ardizzone	Italy	29:16.2	
9	Carlos García	Spain	29:17.4	
10	Antonino Mangano	Italy	29:18.2	
11	Peter Fredriksson	Sweden	29:21.4	
12	Peter Suchan	Czechoslovakia	29:25.6	
13	Tom Howard	Canada	29:29.9	
14	Takeo Koga	Japan	29:34.8	
15	Brian Cole	Great Britain	29:48.0	
16	Petras Simonelis	Soviet Union	29:49.70	
17	Brendan Layh	Australia	29:54.03	
18	Zbigniew Pierzynka	Poland	29:56.0	
19	Francisco Assis	Portugal	30:49.8	
20	Cherif Benali	Algeria	31:17.6	
21	Mohammad Vodjdanzadeh	Iran	31:22.4	
22	Gabor Bathori	Hungary	32:04.6	
23	Mohamed Koivogui	Guinea	36:37.0	
