= Gmina Tuchomie =

Gmina Tuchomie Tuchomie Commune
- Gmina
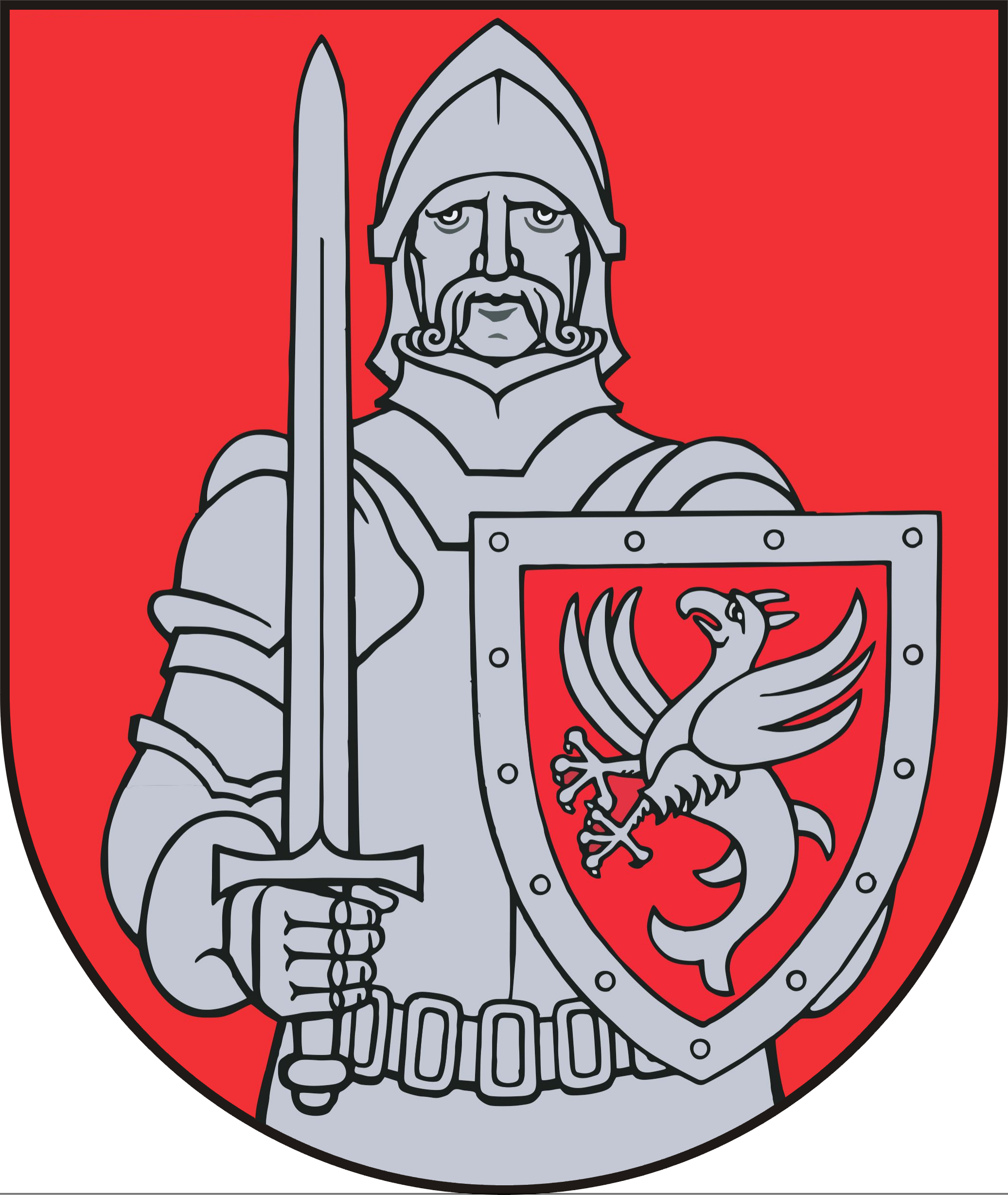
- Coat of arms
- Interactive map of Gmina Tuchomie
- Coordinates (Tuchomie): 54°6′56″N 17°20′7″E
- Country: Poland
- Voivodeship: Pomeranian
- County: Bytów
- Seat: Tuchomie

Area
  - Total: 106.47 km^{2} (41.11 sq mi)

Population (2006)
  - Total: 3,915
  - Density: 36.77/km^{2} (95.24/sq mi)
- Website: http://www.tuchomie.pl

Gmina Tuchomie (Kashubian: Tëchòmié) is a rural gmina (administrative district) in Bytów County, Pomeranian Voivodeship, in northern Poland. Its seat is the village of Tuchomie, which lies approximately 11 kilometres (7 mi) west of Bytów and 89 km (55 mi) west of the regional capital Gdańsk.

The gmina covers an area of 106.47 square kilometres (41.1 sq mi), and as of 2006 its total population is 3,915.

== Villages ==
Gmina Tuchomie contains the villages and settlements of Chocimierz, Ciemno, Dalekie, Jabłoniec, Kramarzynki, Kramarzyny, Masłowice Trzebiatkowskie, Masłowice Tuchomskie, Masłowiczki, Modrzejewo, Nowe Huty, Piaszno, Piaszno Małe, Tągowie, Tesmarówka, Trzebiatkowa, Tuchomie and Tuchomko.

== Neighbouring gminas ==
Gmina Tuchomie is bordered by the gminas of Borzytuchom, Bytów, Kołczygłowy, Lipnica and Miastko.
