= Claudine Meire =

French sprinter

Personal information
- Nationality: France
- Born: 24 February 1947 (age 79)

Sport
- Event(s): 100 m, 200 m
Medal record
Women's athletics
Representing France
European Indoor Championships
Silver medal – second place	1972 Grenoble	4×180 m

Claudine Meire (born February 24, 1947) is a former French athlete, who specialised in the sprints.

== Biography ==
Featured four times in French team athletics, she won the silver medal in the 4 × 1 lap relay (the lap is 180 m) during the 1972 Indoor European Championships at Grenoble alongside Michèle Beugnet, Christiane Marlet and Nicole Pani.

=== prize list ===
International Awards
Date	Competition	Location	Result	Event
1972	European Indoor Championships	Grenoble	2nd	Relay 4 × 1 lap

=== Records ===
personal records
Event	Performance	Location	Date
100 m	11.7s		1971
200 m	24.5s		1971

== External sources ==
- DocAthlé 2003, French Athletics Federation, p. 420
- Claudine Meire at World Athletics
- Claudine Meire at InterSportStats
