= Petra Kandarr =

East German sprinter

Medal record

Women's athletics

Representing East Germany

European Championships
Gold medal – first place	1969 Athens	100 m
Gold medal – first place	1969 Athens	200 m
Gold medal – first place	1969 Athens	4×100 m
Silver medal – second place	1971 Helsinki	4×100 m

European Indoor Championships
Silver medal – second place	1973 Rotterdam	60 m

Petra Kandarr, née Petra Vogt, (20 August 1950 in Halle – 12 March 2017 in Karlsruhe) was an East German sprinter who specialized in the 100- and 200-metre track events.

== Biography ==
At the 1969 European Championships she won gold medals in both the 100 m and 200 m as well as a gold medal in 4 × 100 metres relay together with teammates Bärbel Podeswa, Renate Meißner and Regina Höfer. For this achievement she was selected as the DDR Sportswoman of the Year.

At the 1971 European Championships she won a silver medal in relay together with teammates Karin Balzer, Renate Stecher and Ellen Stropahl. Kandarr then won a silver medal in 60 metres at the 1973 European Indoor Championships, behind Annegret Richter of West Germany.

She competed for the club SC Chemie Halle during her active career.

Her daughter Jana Kandarr, born 1976, is a former professional tennis player and competed at the 2000 Olympic Games.

Awards
Preceded by (East Germany) Margitta Gummel	East German Sportswoman of the Year; 1969	Succeeded by (East Germany) Erika Zuchold
