= Peter Hertel =

German rower (born c. 1944)

Personal information
- Born: c. 1944

Sport
- Sport: Rowing
- Club: Rgm. Berlin
Medal record
Representing West Germany
World Rowing Championships
Gold medal – first place	1966 Bled	Eight
European Rowing Championships
Silver medal – second place	1965 Duisburg	Coxed four

Peter Hertel (born c. 1944) is a retired West German rower who won the 1966 world title in the eights. Earlier in 1965 he won the national title and a European silver medal in coxed fours.

After retiring from competitions Hertel became a prominent physician specializing in knee injuries. Since 1991 he heads the trauma section of the Berlin Martin Luther hospital and personally performs about 800 surgeries per year. The hospital is annually visited by ca. 10,000 patients.

Hertel is married to Jutta Stöck, an Olympic sprinter and daughter of Olympic javelin champion Gerhard Stöck. They have one daughter and two sons; one of the sons, Ole Hertel, competed nationally in shot put and discus throw.
