= Paul Sampson =

England international rugby union & league player

- Born: Paul Christian Sampson; 12 July 1977 (age 49) Keighley, Yorkshire, England
- Height: 5 ft 9 in (1.75 m)
- Weight: 11 st 9 lb (74 kg)
- School: Woodhouse Grove School
- Notable relative(s): Malcolm Sampson (uncle); Dave Sampson (uncle); Dean Sampson (cousin); Denise Ramsden (cousin)

Rugby union career
- Position: Wing
- Current team: London Welsh
Senior career
Years	Team	Apps	(Points)
- Otley
1996–04	Wasps	110	(196)
2003–04	Bath	4	(0)
2004–05	Worcester		
2005–06	Blackheath		
2006–11	London Welsh		
International career
Years	Team	Apps	(Points)
- England A
1998–2001	England	3	
National sevens team
Years	Team		Comps
- England U-21
- Rugby league career

Playing information
- Position: Wing
Club
Years	Team	Pld	T	G	FG	P
2000	Wakefield Trinity Wildcats	18	8	0	0	32
2004	London Broncos	3	1	0	0	4
	Total	21	9	0	0	36

Paul Christian Sampson (born 12 July 1977) is an English rugby union and rugby league player who played at wing or full-back for London Welsh, Blackheath, Worcester Warriors, Bath and Wasps, plus Wakefield Trinity and London Broncos

== Background ==
Paul Sampson was born in Keighley, West Yorkshire, England.

== Early years ==
In 1995 Sampson was named man-of-the-match in England Schools' record 30–3 win against Australia.

In the summer of 1996, he won the England Schools 100 metres title in 10.48 seconds, beating Dwain Chambers. In July that year he was called into the England rugby squad while still attending Woodhouse Grove School.

== Career ==
Sampson won his first England cap against South Africa at the end of the 1998 Southern hemisphere tour. He won two further caps, both against Canada on the summer North America tour in 2001. All three of his England appearances came on the wing. He also played Sevens for England.

Sampson most notably played for Premiership side London Wasps between 1996 and 2004, appearing for them in over 100 games, including the victorious 1999 Anglo-Welsh Cup Final. He later played for five years at Championship London Welsh from 2006 to 2011, again playing over 100 matches.

Sampson had two spells in rugby league; with Wakefield Trinity in 2000, and with London Broncos in 2004.

== Personal life ==
Sampson's long-term partner and wife was Kirsty Gallacher, by whom he has two children, Oscar and Jude. They divorced in August 2015.

He is the cousin of sprinter Denise Ramsden, and former England rugby league international Dean Sampson. Paul's father is Brian Sampson, Malcolm, and Dave Sampson's elder brother.
