= Trzebielino =

- Village
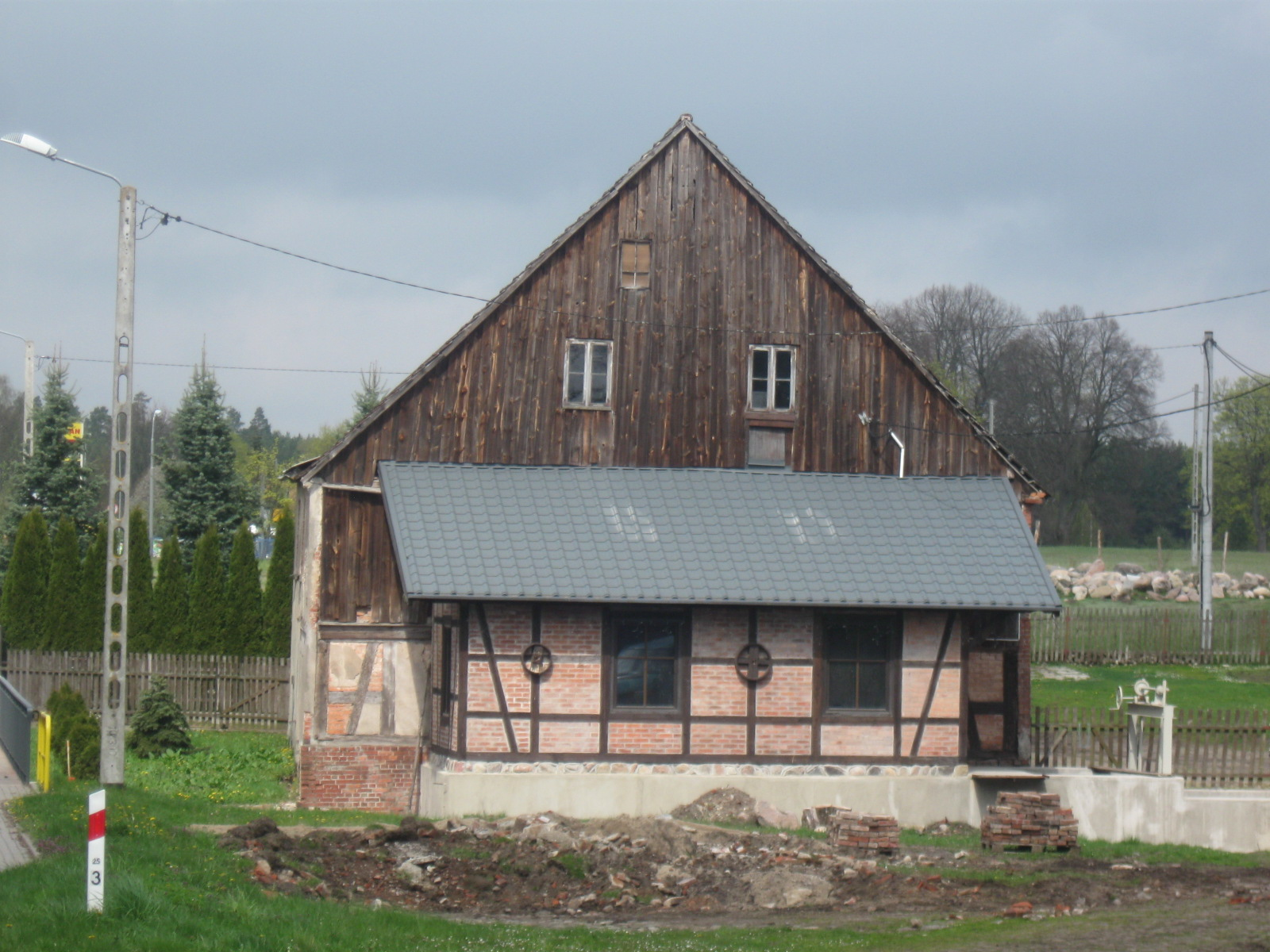
- Water mill

- Location within Poland
- Coordinates: 54°12′2″N 17°5′15″E
- Country: Poland
- Voivodeship: Pomeranian
- County: Bytów
- Gmina: Trzebielino
- Population: 744

Trzebielino [tʂɛbjɛˈlinɔ] (German: Treblin) is a village in Bytów County, Pomeranian Voivodeship, in northern Poland. It is the seat of the gmina (administrative district) called Gmina Trzebielino.

Before 1945, the village belonged to the Prussian Province of Pomerania. On 6 March 1945, it was taken by the Red Army, after which it became a part of Poland. For details of the history of the region, see History of Pomerania.
