= Kramarzyny =

- Village
- Location within Poland
- Coordinates: 54°3′34″N 17°14′31″E
- Country: Poland
- Voivodeship: Pomeranian
- County: Bytów
- Gmina: Tuchomie
- Population: 586

Kramarzyny [kramaˈʐɨnɨ] (German: Kremerbruch, Cashubian Kramarzënë) is a village in the administrative district of Gmina Tuchomie, within Bytów County, Pomeranian Voivodeship, in northern Poland.
