= Jutta Stöck =

German athletics competitor

Personal information
- Born: 29 September 1941 (age 84) Müncheberg, Germany
- Height: 178 cm (5 ft 10 in)
- Weight: 65 kg (143 lb)

Sport
- Sport: Athletics
- Events: 100 m, 200 m
- Club: OSC Berlin

Achievements and titles
- Personal bests: 100 m – 11.5 (1966); 200 m – 23.25 (1968)
Medal record
Women's athletics
Representing West Germany
European Championships
Silver medal – second place	1966 Budapest	4×100 m
Silver medal – second place	1969 Athens	4×100 m

Jutta Bettina Stöck (later Hertel, born 29 September 1941) is a retired West German sprinter who won European silver medals in the 4 × 100 m relay in 1966 and 1969. She also held the national title in the relay in 1966–68. She competed at the 1968 Summer Olympics in the 200 m and 4 × 100 m relay and placed eighth and sixth, respectively. Her eighth-place result was enough for setting a new German record over 200 m.

Stöck is a bank clerk by profession. Her father Gerhard Stöck was a versatile track and field athlete, who competed in decathlon, and won two medals in throwing events at the 1936 Summer Olympics; he was also a Sturmbannführer in the Nazi Sturmabteilung division and a prominent Olympic sports official. Jutta Stöck married the rower Peter Hertel. They have one daughter and two sons. One of the sons, Ole Hertel, competed nationally in shot put and discus throw.
