= Malcolm Sampson =

English rugby league footballer

- Malcolm Sampson with the NRFU Challenge Cup

Personal information
- Full name: Malcolm Sampson
- Born: 12 March 1940 Wakefield, England
- Died: 10 October 2012 (aged 72) Wakefield, England

Playing information
- Position: Prop
Club
Years	Team	Pld	T	G	FG	P
1959–64	Wakefield Trinity	98	9	5	0	37
1964–65	Hull FC	4
1965–66	Wakefield Trinity
1966–72	Bramley
	Total	102	9	5	0	37
- Relatives: Dave Sampson (brother); Dean Sampson (nephew); Denise Ramsden (niece); Paul Sampson (nephew)

Malcolm "Mal" "Sammy" Sampson (12 March 1940 – 10 October 2012) was an English professional rugby league footballer who played in the 1950s, 1960s and 1970s. He played at club level for Wakefield Trinity (two spells), Hull FC and Bramley, as a prop.

== Background ==
Malcolm Sampson's birth was registered in Lower Agbrigg, West Riding of Yorkshire, England, and he died aged 72 in Wakefield, West Yorkshire

== Playing career ==
=== Challenge Cup Final appearances ===
Mal Sampson played at prop and scored the first try in Wakefield Trinity's 25-10 victory over Wigan in the 1963 Challenge Cup Final during the 1962–63 season at Wembley Stadium, London on Saturday 11 May 1963, in front of a crowd of 84,492.

=== Club career ===
Mal Sampson signed for Wakefield Trinity Juniors (under 17s) in 1956, and made his début for Wakefield Trinity in the 31-6 victory over Huddersfield at Belle Vue, Wakefield in November 1959, his third game came in the 20-10 victory over the 1959 Australian Kangaroo Tourists at Belle View, Wakefield. He had played 24 successive matches up to April 1960 when he was involved in a car crash in which he suffered a badly broken arm, he consequently missed the 1959–60 Challenge Cup Final (being replaced by Leslie Chamberlain) and the possibility to play for Great Britain in the 1960 Rugby League World Cup (Great Britain's World Cup props were; Brian McTigue (Wigan) and colleague Jack Wilkinson (Wakefield Trinity), complications to the broken arm meant he eventually made his comeback some 2½ years later, in November 1962 against Widnes at Naughton Park, Widnes, he finished the 1962–63 season with a try in the Challenge Cup Final, and is still the only Wakefield Trinity Forward to score a try at Wembley, he became Wakefield Trinity's first ever league substitute against Halifax, at Thrum Hall, Halifax in September 1964, he had a four-game loan period at Hull F.C. during the 1965–66 season, his last match for Wakefield Trinity was against York at Belle View, Wakefield in November 1966, after which he signed for Bramley.

== Genealogical information ==
Mal Sampson was the older brother of the rugby league footballer, and coach David Sampson, and uncle of the sprinter Denise Ramsden, rugby league footballer Dean Sampson, and rugby union and rugby league footballer Paul Sampson.
