= Giuseppe Ardizzone =

Italian long-distance runner

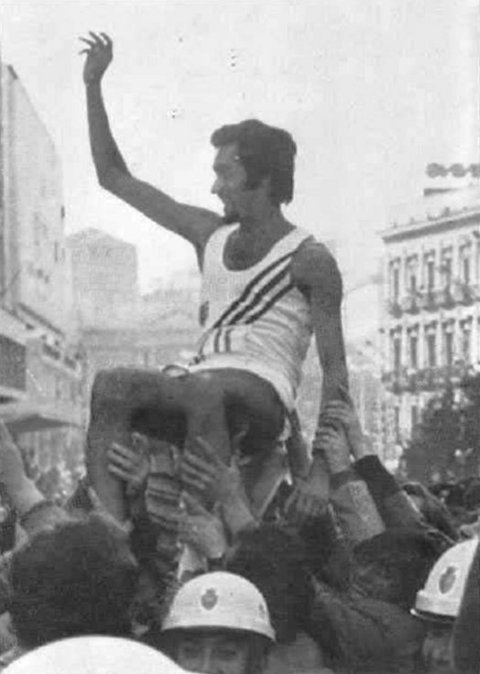
- Ardizzone in Catania in 1972.

Personal information
- National team: Italy: 22 caps (1967-1973)
- Born: 17 February 1947 (age 79) Catania, Italy

Sport
- Sport: Athletics
- Event: Long-distance running
- Club: G.S. Fiamme Gialle; Cus Pro Patria Milano

Achievements and titles
- Personal bests: 3000 m: 8:05.8 (1973); 5000 m: 13:44.2 (1971); 10,000 m: 28:42.4 (1972); 25,000 m: 1:17:28.2 (1971); 30,000 m: 1:35:23.0 (1971); Marathon: 2:21:56.2 (1974)

Giuseppe Ardizzone (17 February 1947) was an Italian long-distance runner, who was 6th in the 5000 m at the 1969 European Athletics Championships.

Two-time national champion at senior level.

== Career ==
Ardizzone between 1966 and 1973 was one of the best Italians in the middle distance/cross-country running sector. He held the national records of 3000 meters (7:59.6 in 1968) and 10,000 meters (29:04.2 in 1970).

== National records ==
- 3000 metres: 7:59.6 ( (Italy) Rome, 31 August 1968) - record holder until 11 August 1970.
- 10,000 metres: 29:04.2 ( (Spain) Madrid, 31 May 1970) - record holder until 1 May 1971.
- 25,000 metres: 1:17:28.2 ( (Italy) Busto Arsizio, 13 November 1971) - record holder until 30 October 1977.

== Achievements ==
Year	Competition	Venue	Rank	Event	Time	Notes
1966	Giro di Castelbuono	(Italy) Castelbuono	1st	10 km	37.06	
1969	European Championships	(Greece) Athens	6th	5000 m	13:51.8	
1970	Campaccio	(Italy) San Giorgio su Legnano	2nd	11.8 km	36:13.1	
1970	Universiade	(Italy) Turin	6th	10,000 m	29:52.0	
1971	European Championships	(Finland) Helsinki	18th NQ	5000 m	14:06.6	
1971	Giro al Sas	(Italy) Trento	1st	10 km	36.36	
1973	Palio Città della Quercia	(Italy) Rovereto	1st	5 km	14:19.8	
1973	Giro di Castelbuono	(Italy) Castelbuono	1st	10 km	35.38	
1973	Universiade	(Soviet Union) Moscow	8th	10,000 m	29:16.2	

== See also ==
- Italy at the 1969 European Athletics Championships
