= David Sampson (rugby league) =

English RL coach and former rugby league footballer (1944–2021)

Personal information
- Born: 6 August 1944; Leeds, England
- Died: 26 July 2021 (aged 76)

Playing information
- Position: Centre, Second-row
Club
Years	Team	Pld	T	G	FG	P
1963–1966	Wakefield Trinity	26	10	4	0	38
≤1966–≥78	Bramley	269+10	33	53	2	207
1978–1981	Castleford	28
	Total	333	43	57	2	245

Coaching information
Club
Years	Team	Gms	W	D	L	W%
1987–88	Castleford	35	17	1	17	49
≤1990–≥91	Doncaster
≥1992–≤93	Nottingham City
	Total	35	17	1	17	49
- Relatives: Dean Sampson (son); Malcolm Sampson (brother); Denise Ramsden (niece); Paul Sampson (nephew)

David "Dave" Sampson (6 August 1944 – 26 July 2021) was an English professional rugby league footballer who played in the 1960s, 1970s and 1980s, and coached in the 1980s and 1990s. He played at club level for Wakefield Trinity, Bramley and Castleford, as a centre, or second-row, and coached at club level for Castleford, Doncaster and Nottingham City.

== Background ==
Dave Sampson's birth was registered in Leeds, West Riding of Yorkshire, England.

== Playing career ==
=== BBC2 Floodlit Trophy Final appearances ===
Dave Sampson played at second-row and scored a try in Bramley's 15–7 victory over Widnes in the 1973 BBC2 Floodlit Trophy Final during the 1973–74 season at Naughton Park, Widnes on Tuesday 18 December 1973.

=== Club career ===
Dave Sampson made his début for Wakefield Trinity during September 1963.

== Coaching career ==
=== County Cup Final appearances ===
Dave Sampson was the coach in Castleford's 12–12 draw with Bradford Northern in the 1987 Yorkshire Cup Final during the 1987–88 season at Headingley, Leeds on Saturday 17 October 1987, and the 2–11 defeat by Bradford Northern in the 1987 Yorkshire Cup Final replay during the 1987–88 season at Elland Road, Leeds on Saturday 31 October 1987.

=== Club career ===
Dave Sampson was the coach of Castleford, his first game in charge was on 30 August 1987, and his last game in charge was on 24 April 1988.

== Personal life ==
Dave Sampson was the father of the rugby league footballer Dean Sampson, younger brother of the rugby league footballer Malcolm Sampson, and uncle of the sprinter Denise Ramsden, and rugby union and rugby league footballer Paul Sampson.

His death was announced on 29 July 2021.
