= Denise Ramsden (athlete) =

English Olympian sprint athlete

Personal information
- Nationality: British (English)
- Born: 11 February 1952 Wakefield, England
- Died: 19 April 2003 (aged 51)
- Height: 1.6 m (5 ft 3 in)
- Weight: 8 st 5 lb (53.1 kg; 117.0 lb)
- Relatives: Dave Sampson (uncle); Malcolm Sampson (uncle); Dean Sampson (cousin); Paul Sampson (cousin)

Sport
- Sport: Athletics
- Event: Sprints
- Club: Dorothy Hyman Track Club
Medal record
Women's athletics
Representing Great Britain
European Championships
Bronze medal – third place	1969 Athens	4 × 100 metres relay

Denise Irene Ramsden (married name Castle) (11 February 1952 – 19 April 2003) was an English Olympian athlete who competed at the 1976 Summer Olympics.

== Biography ==
Ramsden, as a child, attended Stanley St. Peter's School in Stanley, West Riding of Yorkshire and ran at club level for the Dorothy Hyman Track Club.

Ramsden won a bronze medal in the 4 × 100 metres relay team, running 44.39 seconds in the 1969 European Athletics Championships in the Karaiskakis Stadium, Athens, Greece, the team was; Ramsden, Anita Neil, Sheila Cooper and Val Peat.

Ramsden's set a personal best time for the 100 metres of 11.67 seconds set at Meadowbank Stadium, Edinburgh on 6 August 1976. On emonth later Ramsden became the British 200 metres champion after winning the British WAAA Championships title at the 1976 WAAA Championships at Crystal Palace, setting a personal best time for the 200 metres of 23.48 seconds.

At the 1976 Olympics Games in Montreal, she represented Great Britain and set her best time for the 4 × 100 metres relay, running 43.44 seconds for Great Britain and Northern Ireland Olympic team at the Olympic Stadium on 30 July 1976. The team that set the British record and finished eighth in the final was; Ramsden, Wendy Clarke, Sharon Colyear and Andrea Lynch.

Ramsden married Robert Castle in 1978 and competed under her married name thereafter.

== Personal life ==
Denise Ramsden was the niece of the rugby league footballers Malcolm Sampson, and David Sampson, and the cousin of the rugby league footballer Dean Sampson, and rugby union and rugby league footballer Paul Sampson.
