= Gerhard Stöck =

German athlete

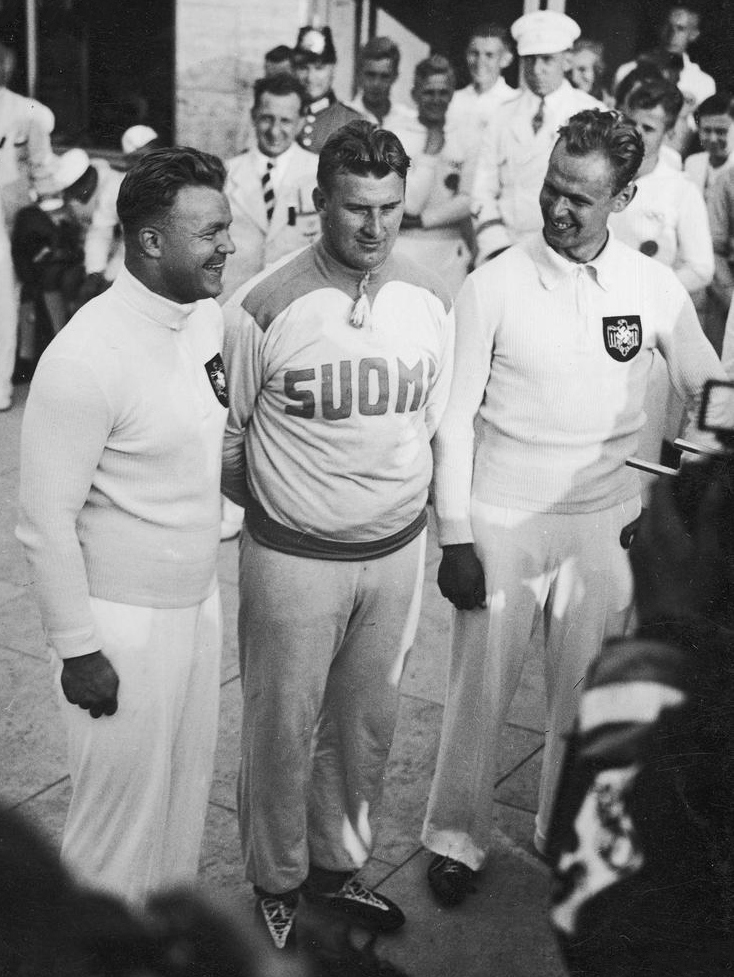
- Stöck (right) at the 1936 Olympics

Personal information
- Born: Gerhard Karl Eduard Stöck; 28 July 1911 Kaiserswalde, German Empire
- Died: 29 March 1985 (aged 73) Hamburg, West Germany
- Height: 184 cm (6 ft 0 in)
- Weight: 91 kg (201 lb)
- Children: Jutta Stöck

Sport
- Sport: Athletics
- Events: Shot put, javelin throw
- Club: SC Charlottenburg, Berlin

Achievements and titles
- Personal bests: SP – 16.49 m (1939); JT – 73.96 m (1935)
Medal record
Men's athletics
Representing Germany
Olympic Games
Gold medal – first place	1936 Berlin	Javelin throw
Bronze medal – third place	1936 Berlin	Shot put
European Championships
Silver medal – second place	1938 Paris	Shot put

Gerhard Karl Eduard Stöck (28 July 1911 – 29 March 1985) was a German athlete and Nazi officer. He won the gold medal in the javelin throw event at the 1936 Summer Olympics and placed third in the shot put.

== Early life ==
Stöck was the son of a butcher. He was born in Kaiserswalde, a small village now in Poland, in 1911, and grew up in the Province of Posen.

== Athletic career and World War II ==
He was a versatile athlete and, besides throwing events, competed in decathlon and won the javelin and pentathlon events at the 1935 World Student Games. Domestically, he won the German javelin title in 1938 and placed second from 1933 to 1947. He never won the German shot put title, due to strong competition from Hans Woellke, and placed second four times. At the 1938 European Championships, Stöck won a silver medal in the shot put, surprisingly beating Woellke, but placed only seventh in the javelin throw.

Stöck had a degree in philology and worked as a teacher from 1938. Earlier in 1933, he became a member of the Nazi paramilitary organization, the Sturmabteilung, and, in 1944, was promoted to SA-Sturmbannführer. In the lead-up to Operation Uranus, Stöck reported to General Schmidt's division that day an expected Soviet attack; it the first of the operation. The message was not passed on to Schmidt, however, as it was considered another false alarm. This lack of early response is thought to have contributed to the Soviet success of Operation Uranus.

After World War II, he continued competing until the early 1950s, then worked as a sports administrator. He served as Chef de Mission of the Unified German Olympic team in 1956 and 1960 and as deputy chef de mission in 1964. His past military activity was raised only after his death in 1985. Among other things, it was found that he falsified his birth year, changing it from 1911 to 1910.

== Personal life ==
Stöck was married and raised an athletic family. His daughter, Jutta Stöck, became an Olympic sprinter, while his son-in-law, Peter Hertel, was a 1966 world champion in rowing. His grandson, Ole Hertel, was a competitive shot putter and discus thrower.
