= Tuchomko =

- Village
- Location within Poland
- Coordinates: 54°8′3″N 17°21′50″E
- Country: Poland
- Voivodeship: Pomeranian
- County: Bytów
- Gmina: Tuchomie
- Population: 222

Tuchomko [tuˈxɔmkɔ] is a village in the administrative district of Gmina Tuchomie, within Bytów County, Pomeranian Voivodeship, in northern Poland.

For details of the history of the region, see History of Pomerania.
