= Gmina Borzytuchom =

Gmina Borzytuchom Borzytuchom Commune
- Gmina
- Flag Coat of arms
- Interactive map of Gmina Borzytuchom
- Coordinates (Borzytuchom): 54°12′2″N 17°22′5″E
- Country: Poland
- Voivodeship: Pomeranian
- County: Bytów
- Seat: Borzytuchom

Area
  - Total: 108.57 km^{2} (41.92 sq mi)

Population (2006)
  - Total: 2,791
  - Density: 25.71/km^{2} (66.58/sq mi)
- Website: http://www.borzytuchom.pl

Gmina Borzytuchom is a rural gmina (administrative district) in Bytów County, Pomeranian Voivodeship, in northern Poland. Its seat is the village of Borzytuchom, which lies approximately 12 kilometres (7 mi) north-west of Bytów and 85 km (53 mi) west of the regional capital, Gdańsk.

The gmina covers an area of 108.57 square kilometres (41.9 sq mi), and as of 2006, its total population is 2,791.

The gmina contains part of the protected area called Słupia Valley Landscape Park.

== Villages ==
Gmina Borzytuchom includes the villages and settlements of Borzytuchom, Chotkowo, Dąbrówka, Jutrzenka, Kamieńc, Kamienica, Krosnowo, Niedarzyno, Osieki, Ryczyn, and Struszewo.

== Neighbouring gminas ==
Gmina Borzytuchom is bordered by the gminas of Bytów, Czarna Dąbrówka, Dębnica Kaszubska, Kołczygłowy and Tuchomie.
