= Leszek Pękalski =

Polish serial killer

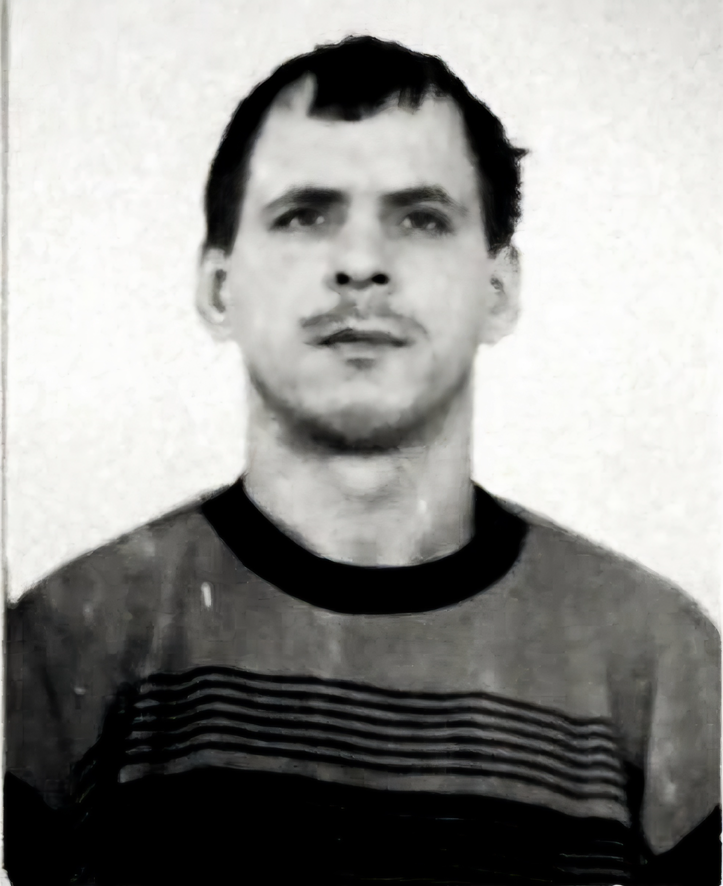
- Pękalski in 1992
- Born: Leszek Pękalski; 12 February 1966 (age 60); Osieki, Bytów, Poland
- Other name: The Vampire of Bytów
- Conviction: 1 count of murder

Details
- Victims: 1–80
- Span of crimes: 1984–1992
- Country: Poland

Leszek Jacek Pękalski, known as The Vampire of Bytów (born 12 February 1966) is a Polish murderer and suspected serial killer. He is believed to have killed at least 17 people between 1984 and 1992. At some stages of his criminal proceedings, he admitted to having killed as many as 90 people; which he later retracted.

He was initially arrested in 1992 for the rape of a 17-year-old girl Sylwia, and was sentenced on a two-year suspended sentence. In 1996 he was convicted of murdering Sylwia for which he was sentenced 25 years imprisonment, This was the only murder proven as his; since 2007 he could apply for a conditional early release yet all of these applications were rejected. Pękalski was released on 11 December 2017, then transferred to a National Center for the Prevention of Dyssocial Behavior in Gostynin for evaluation. He will be evaluated by psychiatrists every six months and the court will decide whether to detain or release him.

== See also ==
- List of serial killers by country
