= Brigitte Roesen =

German long jumper

Medal record

Women's athletics

Representing West Germany

European Indoor Championships
Gold medal – first place	1972 Grenoble	Long jump

Brigitte Roesen (born 18 January 1944) is a German female former track and field athlete who competed for West Germany in the long jump. Her greatest achievement was a gold medal at the 1972 European Athletics Indoor Championships, which she won in a career best distance of 6.58 m (21 ft 7 in). She also competed at the 1971 European Athletics Indoor Championships, but did not win a medal.

== International competitions ==
Year	Competition	Venue	Position	Event	Notes
1971	European Indoor Championships	Sofia, Bulgaria	7th	Long jump	6.20 m
1972	European Indoor Championships	Grenoble, France	1st	Long jump	6.58 m

== See also ==
- List of European Athletics Indoor Championships medalists (women)
