= Borzytuchom =

- Village
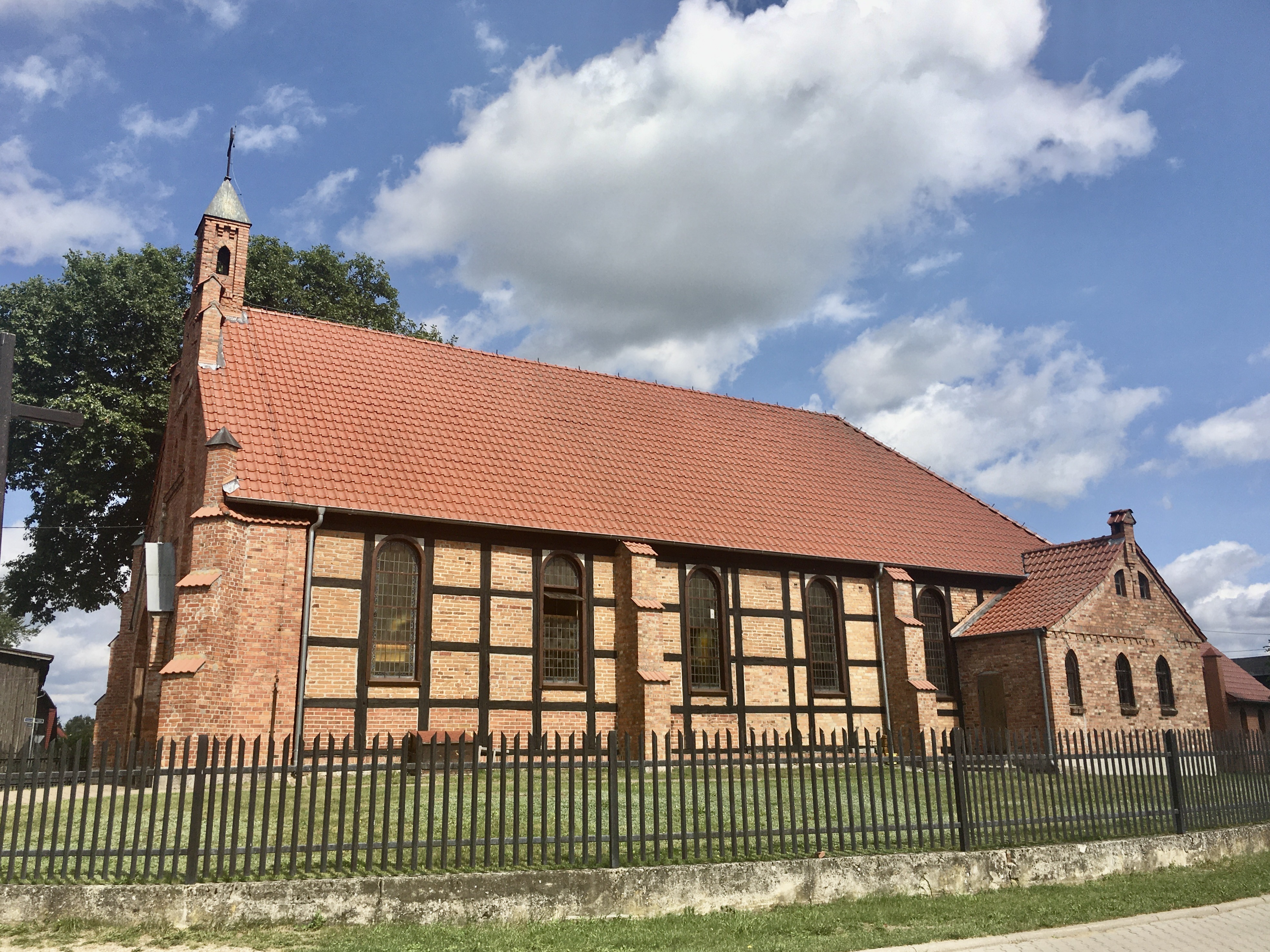
- Sacred Heart church in Borzytuchom

- Location within Poland
- Coordinates: 54°12′2″N 17°22′5″E
- Country: Poland
- Voivodeship: Pomeranian
- County: Bytów
- Gmina: Borzytuchom
- Population: 820

Borzytuchom [bɔʐɨˈtuxɔm] is a village in Bytów County, Pomeranian Voivodeship, in northern Poland.
