= Anita Neil =

British sprinter (born 1950)

Anita Neil MBE OLY
Personal information
- Nationality: British (English)
- Born: 5 April 1950 (age 76) Wellingborough, Northamptonshire, England
- Height: 163 cm (5 ft 4 in)
- Weight: 55 kg (121 lb)

Sport
- Sport: Athletics
- Event: Sprinting
- Club: London Olympiades
Medal record
Women's athletics
Representing England
Commonwealth Games
Silver medal – second place	1970 Edinburgh	4 x 100 metres relay
Representing Great Britain
European Championships
Bronze medal – third place	1969 Athens	100 metres
Bronze medal – third place	1969 Athens	4 × 100 metres relay

Doris Anita Neil (born 5 April 1950) is a retired British international sprinter. In 1968, she became the first black British woman Olympian at the 1968 Summer Olympics.

== Early life ==
Neil was born in Wellingborough, Northamptonshire, to an African-American father and a white English mother. Neil's father was a staff sergeant with the United States Army stationed in Wellingborough during World War II, where he met her mother, Florence, a local woman. Neil's father, who travelled back and forth between the US and England, left when she was six. In his absence Neil's mother raised their five children single-handed with the support of Neil's grandparents.

== Career ==
Neil worked as a machinist in a clothing factory and trained in her spare time. From an impoverished family Neil was forced to rely on charity to travel to competitions and obtain equipment.

Known primarily as a sprinter, Neil's first competition for Great Britain was in the long jump in 1966. She competed for Great Britain in the 1967 European Cup.

At a national competition in Portsmouth, she won the 100 yards and broke the national record (10.6 seconds). At the same meet she was part of the 4 x 110m relay team who set a World Record. Neil was invited to Buckingham Palace which she remembered because she met George Best.

Neil finished second behind Val Peat in the 100 metres event at the 1968 WAAA Championships. Shortly afterwards at the 1968 Olympic Games in Mexico City, she represented Great Britain in the 100 metres competition, where she was eliminated in the second quarter final and the 4 × 100 metres relay, finishing seventh in the final. She was encouraged by her hero Mary Rand and she became a member of the women's athletics club London Olympiades and is considered 'a pioneer in the first generation of Black British female Olympic Athletes'.^{:319}

In 1969, she competed at the European Athletics Championships in Athens, where she won bronze medals in the 100 metres as well as in 4 x 100-metres relay.^{:205}

Neil became the national 100 metres champion after winning the British WAAA Championships title at the 1970 WAAA Championships and the following month, Neil represented England at the 1970 British Commonwealth Games in Edinburgh and won a silver medal in the 4 x 100 metres relay.

Neil represented Great Britain at the Olympic Games for a second time at the 1972 Summer Olympics in Munich. Again she progressed to the second round in the 100 metres and to the final in the relay.

== Later life ==
Eventually the lack of a coach, insufficient training facilities, and having to support her family financially saw Neil forced into early retirement at just 23 years old.

Neil continues to live in Wellingborough and has participated in local events. In 2012, she was a guest of honour at the opening of the Wellingborough Museum's exhibition on the Olympic Games. A portrait of her hangs in the museum. She also served as guest of honour at the official opening of the Knights Court in Wellingborough in 2014.

Neil was appointed Member of the Order of the British Empire (MBE) in the 2024 Birthday Honours for services to athletics.
