= Nicole Pani =

French sprinter (born 1948)

Personal information
- Nationality: France
- Born: 30 October 1948 (age 77) Suresnes

Sport
- Event(s): 100 m, 200 m

Achievements and titles
- Regional finals: Indoor European Championships
Medal record
Women's athletics
Representing France
European Indoor Championships
Silver medal – second place	1972 Grenoble	4×180 m

Nicole Pani (born Montandon on 30 October 1948 at Suresnes) is a former French athlete, who specialised in sprinting.

== Biography ==
Pani became notable in the 1966 junior track where she ran 11.8s in the 100 m. and 24.3s in the 200 m. She won second place at the European Championships in the category over 200m. She married the long jumper, Jack Pani.

She participated in the 1968 Olympics, at Mexico and placed fifth in the 200m (23.0s).

Selected 29 times for French athletic teams, she won the silver medal in the 100m during the 1971 Mediterranean Games. In 1972 she was second in the 4 × 1 lap relay (Note: The lap is 180m) in the European Indoor Championships at Grenoble alongside Michèle Beugnet, Claudine Meire and Christiane Marlet.

She titled in the 200m during the 1968 French Athletics Championships, and established multiple French national records in the 200m, the 4 × 100m and the 4 × 200 m.

=== Prize list ===
International Awards
Date	Competition	Location	Result	Event
1968	Olympic Games	Mexico	5th	200 m
1971	Mediterranean Games	İzmir	2nd	100 m
1971	Mediterranean Games	İzmir	2nd	4 × 100 m
1972	European Indoor Championships	Grenoble	2nd	4 × 1 lap Relay

=== Records ===
personal records
Event	Performance	Location	Date
100 m	11.82s		1975
200 m	23.02s		1968
400 m	56.3s		1972
