= Annegret Richter =

German athlete

Personal information
- Born: 13 October 1950 (age 75) Dortmund, West Germany
- Height: 1.67 m (5 ft 6 in)
- Weight: 53 kg (117 lb)

Sport
- Sport: Running
- Club: OSC Dortmund
Medal record
Women's athletics
Representing West Germany
Olympic Games
Gold medal – first place	1972 Munich	4 × 100 m relay
Gold medal – first place	1976 Montreal	100 metres
Silver medal – second place	1976 Montreal	200 metres
Silver medal – second place	1976 Montreal	4 × 100 m relay
European Championships
Gold medal – first place	1971 Helsinki	4 × 100 m relay
Silver medal – second place	1974 Rome	4 × 100 m relay
European Indoor Championships
Gold medal – first place	1973 Rotterdam	60 m
Gold medal – first place	1973 Rotterdam	4×170 m
Silver medal – second place	1972 Grenoble	50 m
Bronze medal – third place	1971 Sofia	60 m
Representing Europe
World Cup
Gold medal – first place	1977 Düsseldorf	4 × 100 m relay
Gold medal – first place	1979 Montreal	4 × 100 m relay
Bronze medal – third place	1979 Montreal	100 metres

Annegret Richter (née Irrgang; born 13 October 1950) is a German (former West German) athlete and the 1976 Olympic 100 m champion.

== Biography ==
Born Annegret Irrgang, she won her first international title at the 1971 European Championships, as a part of her country's 4 × 100 m relay team. The next year, at the 1972 Summer Olympics in Munich, she finished 5th in the 100 m, in front of her home crowd. As she had married hurdler Manfred Richter, she now ran under that name. With the relay team, Richter ran a new world record, beating rivals East Germany for the gold medal.

She took the 60 meter title at the European Indoor Championships in 1973. After taking a bronze in 1971 and a silver in 1972 (over 50 meters).

At the 1974 European Championships in Rome she was again a member of the national 4 × 100 m relay team, this time winning the silver medal. She was fourth in the 100 metre final.

Before the 1976 Summer Olympics, everybody's attention was not directed at Richter, but at fellow Dortmunder Inge Helten, who had set a new world record of 11.04 just prior to the Games. Richter beat the defending champion Renate Stecher of East Germany in the first round, and ran 11.05 in the second round and set a world record of 11.01 in the semifinals. In the final, Richter, Stecher and Helten finished within one metre of each other, with Richter winning the gold and vanquishing Stecher. Three days later she won a silver medal in the 200 m and another one in the 4 × 100 m relay, being beaten by East Germany this time.

Richter ran the 3rd leg of the winning relay squad at the first World Cup of Track and Field in 1977, she had the second fastest time of the year for the 100 meters of 11.03. She would finish 3rd in the 100 meters and 4th in the 200 meters at the second World Cup in 1979, again running the 3rd leg of the victorious European relay squad, and retired after the boycott of the 1980 Moscow games. During her career she won 28 national titles. Her daughter Daniela and son Marcus also competed in athletics, at the national level.

== See also ==
- German all-time top lists – 100 metres

Records
Preceded by (West Germany) Inge Helten	Women's 100 m World Record Holder; 25 July 1976 – 1 July 1977	Succeeded by (East Germany) Marlies Göhr
