= 1972 European Athletics Indoor Championships =

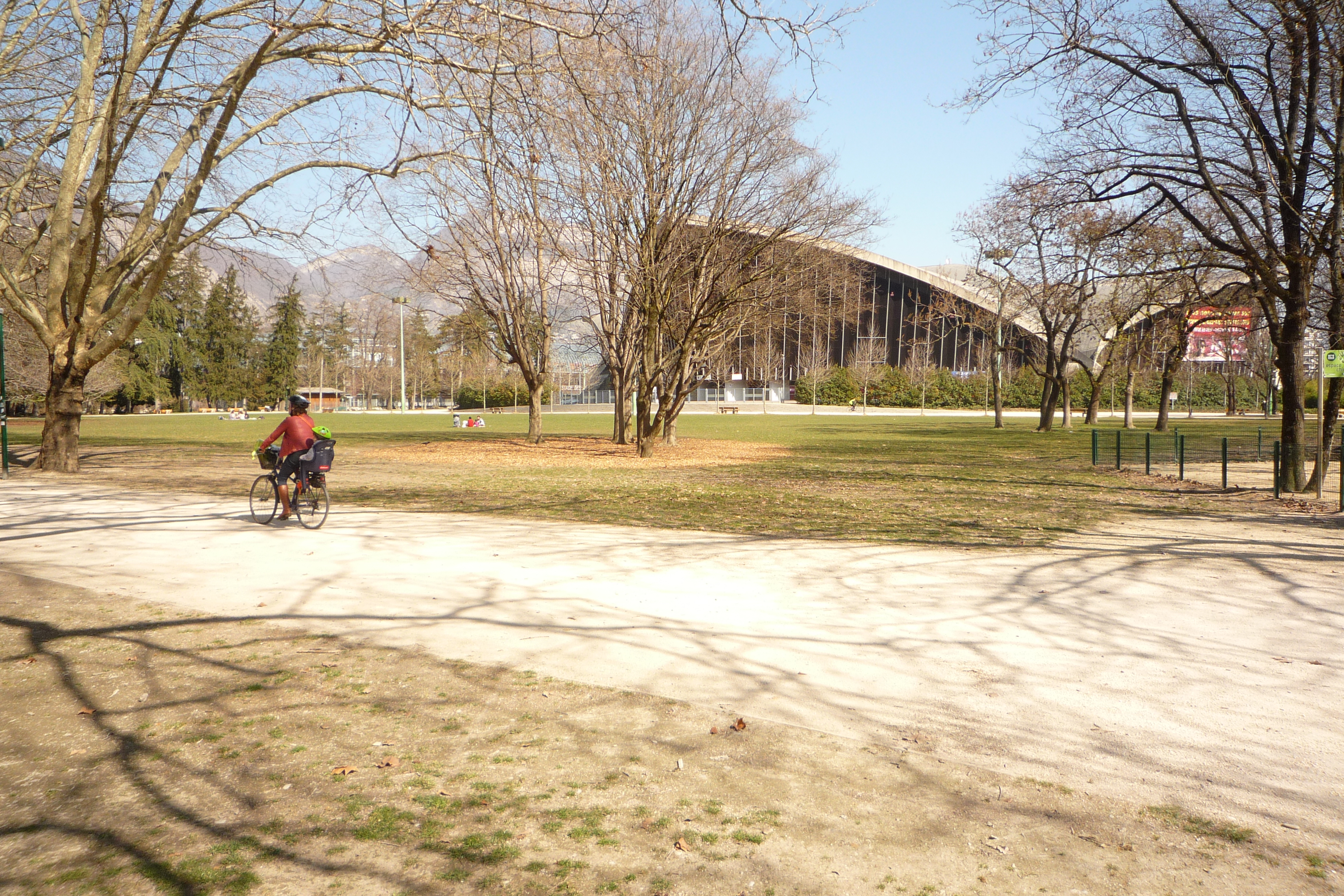
- Dates: 11–12 March 1972
- Host city: Grenoble; France
- Venue: Palais des Sports
- Events: 23
- Participation: 264 athletes from 23 nations
- Records set: 7 WB, 11 CR

The 1972 European Athletics Indoor Championships were held between 11–12 March 1972 in Grenoble, France.

The track used for the championships was 180 metres long.

== Medal summary ==
=== Men ===
Event	Gold		Silver		Bronze	
50 metres	Valeriy Borzov (URS)	5.75 =WB	Aleksandr Kornelyuk (URS)	5.81	Vasilis Papageorgopoulos (GRE)	5.82
400 metres	Georg Nückles (FRG)	47.24	Ulrich Reich (FRG)	47.42	Wolfgang Müller (GDR)	47.42
800 metres	Jozef Plachý (TCH)	1:48.84	Ivan Ivanov (URS)	1:49.05	Francis Gonzalez (FRA)	1:49.17
1500 metres	Jacky Boxberger (FRA)	3:45.66	Spylios Zacharopoulos (GRE)	3:46.08	Jürgen May (FRG)	3:46.42
3000 metres	Juris Grustiņš (URS)	8:02.85	Yuriy Aleksashin (URS)	8:03.20	Ulrich Brugger (FRG)	8:05.07
50 metres hurdles	Guy Drut (FRA)	6.51 WB	Manfred Schumann (FRG)	6.58	Anatoliy Moshiashvili (URS)	6.59
4 × 360 metres relay	Poland; Jan Werner; Waldemar Korycki; Jan Balachowski; Andrzej Badeński	3:11.1	West Germany; Peter Bernreuther; Rolf Krüsmann; Georg Nückles; Ulrich Reich	3:11.9	France; Patrick Salvador; André Paoli; Michel Dach; Gilles Bertould	3:15.6
4 × 720 metres relay	West Germany; Thomas Wessinghage; Harald Norpoth; Paul-Heinz Wellmann; Franz-Josef Kemper	6:26.4a	Soviet Union; Aleksey Taranov; Valeriy Taratynov; Ivan Ivanov; Stanislav Meshcherskikh	6:27.0a	Poland; Zenon Szordykowski; Krzysztof Linkowski; Stanisław Waśkiewicz; Andrzej Kupczyk	6:27.6a
High jump	István Major (HUN)	2.24 CR	Kęstutis Šapka (URS)	2.22	Jüri Tarmak (URS)	2.22
Pole vault	Wolfgang Nordwig (GDR)	5.40 =CR	Hans Lagerqvist (SWE)	5.40	Antti Kalliomäki (FIN)	5.30
Long jump	Max Klauss (GDR)	8.02	Hans Baumgartner (FRG)	7.99	Jaroslav Brož (TCH)	7.88
Triple jump	Viktor Sanyeyev (URS)	16.97 WB	Carol Corbu (ROM)	16.89	Valentyn Shevchenko (URS)	16.73
Shot put	Hartmut Briesenick (GDR)	20.67 AR	Władysław Komar (POL)	20.32	Jaroslav Brabec (TCH)	19.94

=== Women ===
Event	Gold		Silver		Bronze	
50 metres	Renate Stecher (GDR)	6.25 WB	Annegret Richter (FRG)	6.28	Sylviane Telliez (FRA)	6.31
400 metres	Christel Frese (FRG)	53.36	Inge Bödding (FRG)	54.60	Erika Weinstein (FRG)	54.73
800 metres	Gunhild Hoffmeister (GDR)	2:04.83 CR	Ileana Silai (ROM)	2:05.17	Svetla Zlateva (BUL)	2:05.50
1500 metres	Tamara Pangelova (URS)	4:14.62 WB	Lyudmila Bragina (URS)	4:18.35	Vasilena Amzina (BUL)	4:18.84
50 metres hurdles	Annelie Ehrhardt (GDR)	6.85 =WB	Teresa Sukniewicz (POL)	6.94	Grażyna Rabsztyn (POL)	7.05
4 × 180 metres relay	West Germany; Elfgard Schittenhelm; Christine Tackenberg; Annegret Kroniger; Rita Wilden	1:24.1a	France; Michèle Beugnet; Christiane Marlet; Claudine Meire; Nicole Pani	1:27.6a	Austria; Christa Kepplinger; Maria Sykora; Carmen Mähr; Monika Holzschuster	1:29.5a
4 × 360 metres relay	West Germany; Rita Wilden; Erika Weinstein; Christel Frese; Inge Bödding	3:10.85	Soviet Union; Natalya Chistyakova; Lyudmila Aksyonova; Lyubov Zavyalova; Nadezhda Kolesnikova	3:11.20	France; Madeleine Thomas; Bernadette Martin; Nicole Duclos; Colette Besson	3:11.65
High jump	Rita Schmidt (GDR)	1.90 WB	Rita Gildemeister (GDR)	1.84	Yordanka Blagoeva (BUL)	1.84
Long jump	Brigitte Roesen (FRG)	6.58	Meta Antenen (SUI)	6.42	Jarmila Nygrýnová (TCH)	6.39
Shot put	Nadezhda Chizhova (URS)	19.41	Antonina Ivanova (URS)	18.54	Marianne Adam (GDR)	18.30

== Medal table ==
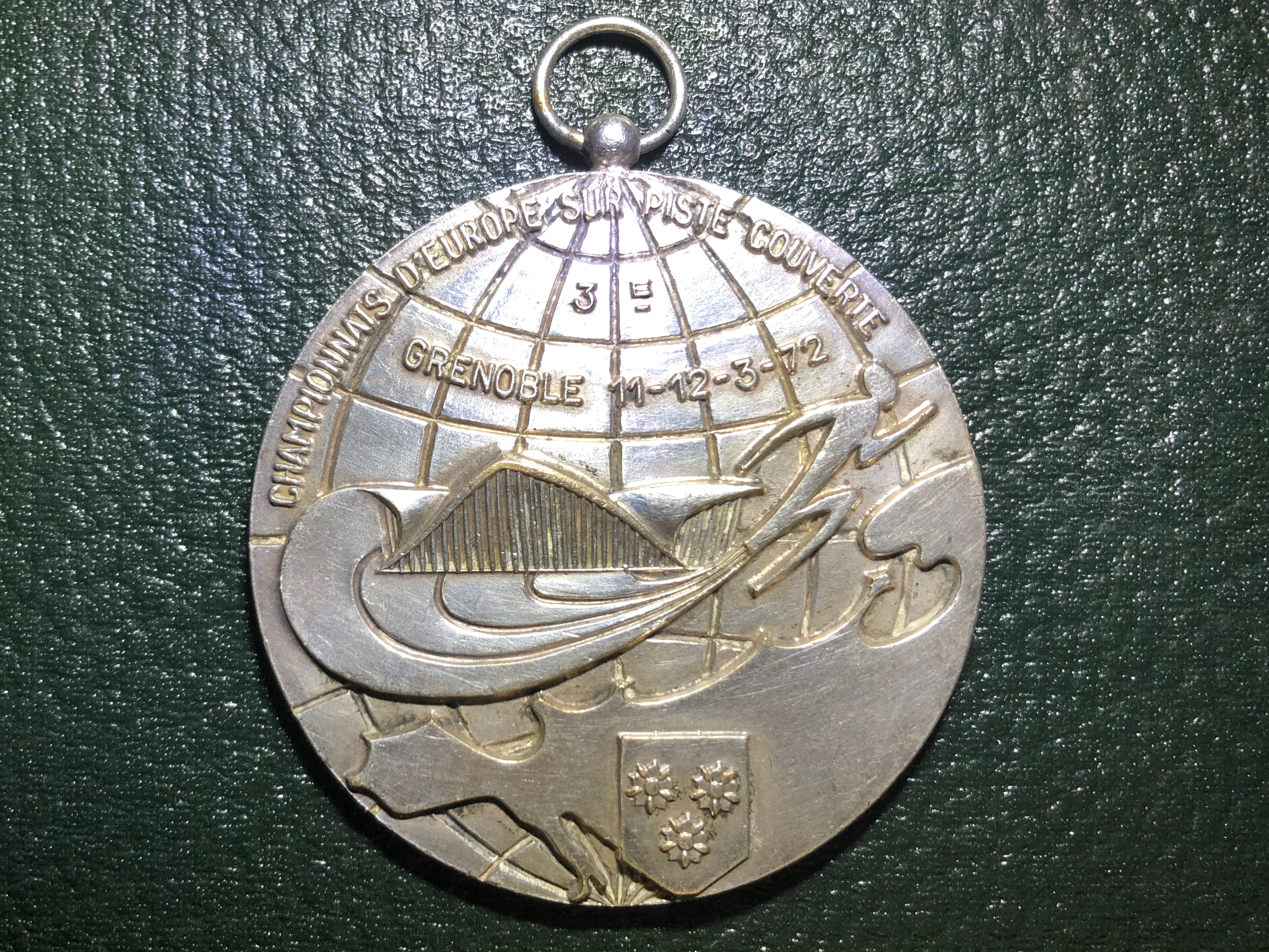
Silver 2nd place medal, European Athletic Indoor Championships, Grenoble, France 11–12 March 1972

Rank	Nation	Gold	Silver	Bronze	Total
1	East Germany (GDR)	7	1	2	10
2	West Germany (FRG)	6	6	3	15
3	Soviet Union (URS)	5	8	3	16
4	France (FRA)	2	1	4	7
5	Poland (POL)	1	2	2	5
6	Czechoslovakia (TCH)	1	0	3	4
7	Hungary (HUN)	1	0	0	1
8	Romania (ROU)	0	2	0	2
9	Greece (GRE)	0	1	1	2
10	Sweden (SWE)	0	1	0	1
10	Switzerland (SUI)	0	1	0	1
12	Bulgaria (BUL)	0	0	3	3
13	Austria (AUT)	0	0	1	1
13	Finland (FIN)	0	0	1	1
Totals (14 entries)		23	23	23	69

== Participating nations ==
- Austria (6)
- Belgium (4)
- Bulgaria (9)
- Czechoslovakia (17)
- Denmark (7)
- East Germany (12)
- Finland (7)
- France (38)
- Great Britain (17)
- Greece (3)
- Hungary (6)
- Iceland (1)
- Italy (11)
- Netherlands (2)
- Norway (1)
- Poland (23)
- Romania (12)
- Soviet Union (32)
- Spain (5)
- Sweden (6)
- Switzerland (6)
- West Germany (34)
- Yugoslavia (5)
