= Michèle Beugnet =

French sprinter

Personal information
- Nationality: France
- Born: 15 April 1950 (age 76)

Sport
- Event: 100 m

Achievements and titles
- Regional finals: Indoor European Championships
Medal record
Women's athletics
Representing France
European Indoor Championships
| Silver medal – second place | 1972 Grenoble | 4×180 m |

Michèle Beugnet (born 15 April 1950) is a former French athlete, specialising in the sprints.

== Biography ==
Nominated 13 times for France athletics teams, she won the silver medal in the 4 × 1 lap relay during the European Indoor Championships 1972 at Grenoble, with Christiane Marlet, Claudine Meire and Nicole Pani.

=== Prize list ===
Internalional competition
| Date | Competition | Place | Result | Relay |
|---|---|---|---|---|
| 1971 | Mediterranean Games | İzmir | 3rd | 100 m |
| 1971 | Mediterranean Games | İzmir | 2nd | 4 × 100 m |
| 1972 | European Indoor Championships | Grenoble | 2nd | Relay 4 × 1 lap |

=== Records ===
Personal records
| Event | Performance | Place | Date |
|---|---|---|---|
| 100 m | 11 s 7 | | 1971 |
| 200 m | 24 s 2 | | 1970 |
