= Danuta Jędrejek =

Polish sprinter

Personal information
- Nationality: Polish
- Born: 17 January 1947 (age 79) Biała Podlaska, Poland

Sport
- Sport: Sprinting
- Event: 4 × 100 metres relay
Medal record
Women's athletics
Representing Poland
European Championships
Bronze medal – third place	1974 Rome	4×100 m

Danuta Jędrejek (born 17 January 1947) is a Polish sprinter. She competed in the women's 4 × 100 metres relay at the 1972 Summer Olympics.
