= Tuchomie =

- Village
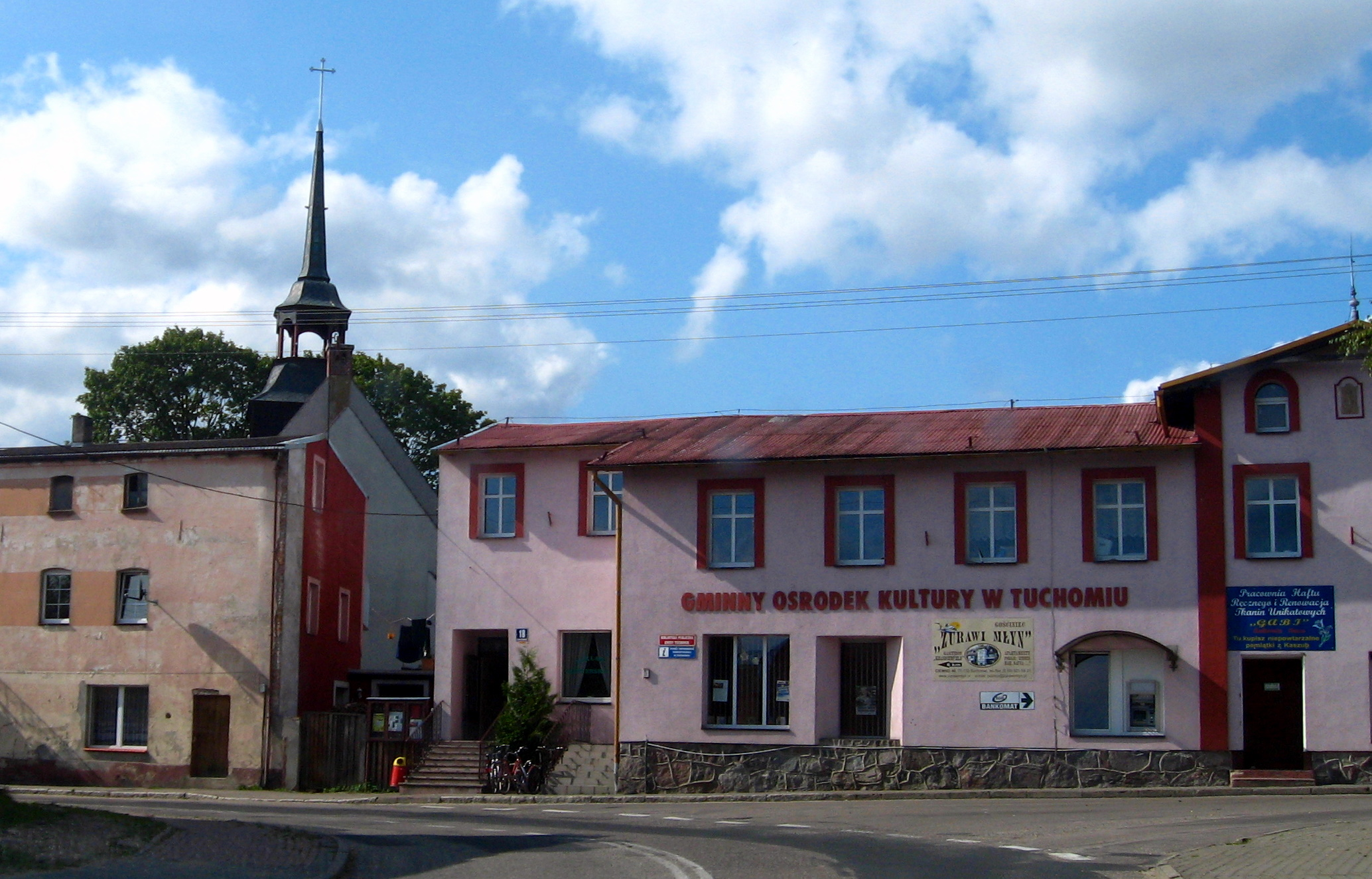
- The municipal culture centre

- Location within Poland
- Coordinates: 54°6′56″N 17°20′7″E
- Country: Poland
- Voivodeship: Pomeranian
- County: Bytów
- Gmina: Tuchomie
- Population: 1,365
- Website: http://www.tuchomie.pl

Tuchomie [tuˈxɔmjɛ] (German: Groß Tuchen) is a village in Bytów County, Pomeranian Voivodeship, in northern Poland. It is the seat of the gmina (administrative district) called Gmina Tuchomie.
