= Bytów County =

Bytów County Powiat bytowski
- County
- Flag Coat of arms

- Division into gminas
- Coordinates (Bytów): 54°8′N 17°30′E
- Country: Poland
- Voivodeship: Pomeranian
- Seat: Bytów
- Gminas: Total 10: Gmina Borzytuchom; Gmina Bytów; Gmina Czarna Dąbrówka; Gmina Kołczygłowy; Gmina Lipnica; Gmina Miastko; Gmina Parchowo; Gmina Studzienice; Gmina Trzebielino; Gmina Tuchomie

Area
  - Total: 2,192.81 km^{2} (846.65 sq mi)

Population (2019)
  - Total: 79,260
  - Density: 36.15/km^{2} (93.62/sq mi)
  - Urban: 27,357
  - Rural: 51,903
- Car plates: GBY
- Website: www.powiatbytowski.pl

Bytów County (Kashubian: bëtowsczi pòwiat, Polish: powiat bytowski) is a unit of territorial administration and local government (powiat) in Pomeranian Voivodeship, northern Poland. It came into being on January 1, 1999, as a result of the Polish local government reforms passed in 1998. Its administrative seat and largest town is Bytów, which lies 79 kilometres (49 mi) west of the regional capital Gdańsk. The only other town in the county is Miastko, lying 37 km (23 mi) west of Bytów.

The county covers an area of 2,192.81 square kilometres (846.6 sq mi). As of 2019, its total population is 79,260, out of which the population of Bytów is 16,918, that of Miastko is 10,439, and the rural population is 51,903.

Bytów County on a map of the counties of Pomeranian Voivodeship

Bytów County is bordered by Słupsk County to the north, Lębork County to the north-east, Kartuzy County and Kościerzyna County to the east, Chojnice County and Człuchów County to the south, and Szczecinek County and Koszalin County to the west.

== Local Government ==
District head

- Leszek Pałasz (1998-2001)
- Andrzej Hrycyna p.o. (2001-2002)
- Michał Świątek-Brzeziński (2002-2006)
- Roman Zaborowski (2006-2007)
- Jacek Żmuda-Trzebiatowski (2007-2015)
- Leszek Waszkiewicz (from 2015)

Vice district head

- Andrzej Hrycyna (1998-2002)
- Tomasz Borowski (2002-2006)
- Krzysztof Sławski (2006-2010)
- Andrzej Marcinkowski (2010-2014)
- Zbigniew Batko (from 2014)

Chairman of the county council

- Mieczysław Bachórz (1998-2002)
- Jerzy Jobczyk (2002-2006)
- Andrzej Hrycyna (from 2006)

== Administrative divisions ==
The county is subdivided into 10 gminas (two urban-rural and eight rural). These are listed in the following table, in descending order of population.

Gmina	Type	Area (km^{2})	Population (2019)	Seat
Gmina Bytów	urban-rural	197.4	25,457	Bytów
Gmina Miastko	urban-rural	466.8	19,558	Miastko
Gmina Czarna Dąbrówka	rural	298.3	5,923	Czarna Dąbrówka
Gmina Lipnica	rural	309.6	5,227	Lipnica
Gmina Tuchomie	rural	106.5	4,266	Tuchomie
Gmina Kołczygłowy	rural	173.3	4,255	Kołczygłowy
Gmina Parchowo	rural	130.9	3,778	Parchowo
Gmina Studzienice	rural	176.0	3,742	Studzienice
Gmina Trzebielino	rural	225.5	3,715	Trzebielino
Gmina Borzytuchom	rural	108.6	3,339	Borzytuchom
