= Athletics at the 1968 Summer Olympics – Women's 4 × 100 metres relay =

Women's 4 × 100 metres relay at the Games of the XIX Olympiad
- Venue: Olympic Stadium
- Dates: 19 October 1968 & 20 October 1968
- Competitors: 60 from 15 nations

Medalists
1st place, gold medalist(s)		Margaret Bailes, Barbara Ferrell, Mildrette Netter, Wyomia Tyus	United States
2nd place, silver medalist(s)		Violetta Quesada, Miguelina Cobián, Marlene Elejarde, Fulgencia Romay	Cuba
3rd place, bronze medalist(s)		Galina Bukharina, Lyudmila Samotyosova, Vera Popkova, Lyudmila Zharkova	Soviet Union

These are the official results of the women's 4 × 100 metres relay event at the 1968 Summer Olympics in Mexico City, Mexico. The event was held on the 19th and 20 October 1968. There were a total number of 15 nations competing.

== Results ==
=== Heats ===
- Held on 19 October 1968

==== Heat 1 ====
RANK	NATION	ATHLETES	TIME (HAND)	TIME (AUTOMATIC)
1.	United States	• Margaret Bailes • Barbara Ferrell • Mildrette Netter • Wyomia Tyus	43.4	43.50
2.	Australia	• Jennifer Lamy • Joyce Bennett • Raelene Boyle • Dianne Burge	43.7	43.77
3.	West Germany	• Renate Meyer • Jutta Stock • Rita Jahn • Ingrid Becker	44.1	44.18
4.	France	• Michèle Alayrangues • Gabrielle Meyer • Nicole Montandon • Sylviane Telliez	44.3	44.32
5.	Canada	• Deborah Miller • Stephanie Berto • Joan Hendry • Irene Piotrowski	44.7	44.73
6.	Nigeria	• Olajumoke Bodunrin • Janet Omorogbe • Mairo Jinadu • Oyeronke Akindele	45.2	45.23
7.	Mexico	• Alma Rosa Martínez • Mercedes Román • Enriqueta Basilio • Esperanza Girón	47.0	47.09
8.	Jamaica	• Adlin Mair-Clarke • Carmen Smith • Una Morris • Vilma Charlton	DQ	–

==== Heat 2 ====
RANK	NATION	ATHLETES	TIME (HAND)	TIME (AUTOMATIC)
1.	Netherlands	• Wilma van den Berg • Mieke Sterk • Truus Hennipman • Corrie Bakker	43.4	43.49
2.	Soviet Union	• Lyudmila Zharkova • Galina Bukharina • Vera Popkova • Lyudmila Samotyosova	43.6	43.67
3.	Great Britain	• Anita Neil • Maureen Tranter • Janet Simpson • Lillian Board	43.9	43.98
4.	Cuba	• Marlene Elejarde • Fulgencia Romay • Violetta Quesada • Miguelina Cobián	44.1	44.15
5	Hungary	• Etelka Kispál • Margit Nemesházi • Györgyi Balogh • Annamária Tóth	44.6	44.65
6.	Taiwan	• Chi Cheng • Chui-Mei Yeh • Lin Chun-yu • A-Mei Tien	47.2	47.24
7.	Poland	• Danuta Straszyńska • Mirosława Sarna • Urszula Jóźwik • Irena Kirszenstein	53.0	53.02

=== Final ===
- Held on 20 October 1968

RANK	NATION	ATHLETES	TIME (HAND)	TIME (AUTOMATIC)
Gold medal	United States	• Margaret Bailes • Barbara Ferrell • Mildrette Netter • Wyomia Tyus	42.8 (WR)	42.88
Silver medal	Cuba	• Violetta Quesada • Miguelina Cobián • Marlene Elejarde • Fulgencia Romay	43.3	43.36
Bronze medal	Soviet Union	• Galina Bukharina • Lyudmila Samotyosova • Vera Popkova • Lyudmila Zharkova	43.4	43.41
4.	Netherlands	• Wilma van den Berg • Mieke Sterk • Truus Hennipman • Corrie Bakker	43.4	43.44
5.	Australia	• Jennifer Lamy • Joyce Bennett • Raelene Boyle • Dianne Burge	43.4	43.50
6.	West Germany	• Renate Meyer • Jutta Stock • Rita Jahn • Ingrid Becker	43.7	43.70
7.	Great Britain	• Anita Neil • Maureen Tranter • Janet Simpson • Lillian Board	43.8	43.78
8.	France	• Michele Alayrangues • Gabrielle Meyer • Nicole Montandon • Silviane Telliez	44.2	44.30
