= Athletics at the 1966 British Empire and Commonwealth Games – Women's 220 yards =

Women's 220 yards at the 1966 British Empire and Commonwealth Games
- Venue: Independence Park, Kingston
- Dates: August 8 and 11, 1966

Medalists
gold medal	Dianne Burge	Australia
silver medal	Jenny Lamy	Australia
bronze medal	Irene Piotrowski	Canada

The women's 220 yards event at the 1966 British Empire and Commonwealth Games was held on 8 and 11 August at the Independence Park in Kingston, Jamaica. It was the last time that the imperial distance was contested: in 1970 it was replaced by the 200 metres.

== Medalists ==
Medallists
Gold	Silver	Bronze
Dianne Burge; Australia	Jenny Lamy; Australia	Irene Piotrowski; Canada

== Results ==
=== Heats ===
==== Qualification for semifinal ====
The first 3 in each heat (Q) and the next 1 fastest (q) qualified for the semifinals.

==== Wind speeds ====
Heat 1: ? m/s, Heat 2: 0.0 m/s, Heat 3: 0.0 m/s, Heat 4: +1.9 m/s, Heat 5: +0.6 m/s

Heats results
Rank	Heat	Name	Nationality	Time	Notes
1	1	Marjorie Turner	Canada	24.6	Q
2	1	Una Morris	Jamaica	24.7	Q
3	1	Gloria Dourass	Wales	25.3	Q
4	1	Sigrid Sandiford	Trinidad and Tobago	25.5	
5	1	Maria Jinadu	Nigeria	25.5	
1	2	Jenny Lamy	Australia	24.2	Q
2	2	Maureen Tranter	England	24.2	Q
3	2	Janet Maddin	Canada	24.9	Q
4	2	Jocelyn Haynes	Trinidad and Tobago	25.3	
5	2	Ana Ramacake	Fiji	25.3	
6	2	Esther Maganga	Tanzania	26.3	
7	2	Teresa Johnson	Sierra Leone	26.5	
1	3	Judy Pollock	Australia	24.1	Q
2	3	Janet Simpson	England	24.2	Q
3	3	Elizabeth Gill	Wales	24.6	Q
4	3	Lorna McGarvey	Northern Ireland	24.9	q
5	3	Olajumoke Bodunrin	Nigeria	25.5	
6	3	Barbara Lyall	Scotland	25.7	
7	3	Thora Best	Trinidad and Tobago	25.9	
8	3	Lydia Stephens	Kenya	26.2	
1	4	Joyce Bennett	Australia	24.2	Q
2	4	Vilma Charlton	Jamaica	24.6	Q
3	4	Valerie Parker	Canada	24.8	Q
4	4	Elizabeth Parsons	Wales	25.0	
5	4	Oyeronke Akindele	Nigeria	25.1	
6	4	Octavia Straker	Trinidad and Tobago	25.2	
1	5	Dianne Burge	Australia	24.5	Q
2	5	Daphne Slater	England	24.8	Q
3	5	Irene Piotrowski	Canada	25.0	Q
4	5	Thelwyn Appleby	Wales	25.5	
5	5	Millicent Jackson	Sierra Leone	27.6	
	5	Adlin Mair	Jamaica	DNS	
	5	Regina Okafor	Nigeria	DNS	

=== Semifinals ===
==== Qualification ====
The first 4 in each heat (Q) qualified directly for the final.

==== Wind speed ====
Heat 1: +2.0 m/s, Heat 2: +0.4 m/s

Semifinals results
Rank	Heat	Name	Nationality	Time	Notes
1	1	Dianne Burge	Australia	24.0	Q
2	1	Una Morris	Jamaica	24.1	Q
3	1	Judy Pollock	Australia	24.2	Q
4	1	Janet Simpson	England	24.2	Q
5	1	Marjorie Turner	Canada	24.3	
6	1	Janet Maddin	Canada	24.5	
7	1	Daphne Slater	England	24.7	
8	1	Gloria Dourass	Wales	25.4	
1	2	Jenny Lamy	Australia	24.1	Q
2	2	Irene Piotrowski	Canada	24.1	Q
3	2	Joyce Bennett	Australia	24.1	Q
4	2	Vilma Charlton	Jamaica	24.4	Q
5	2	Maureen Tranter	England	24.5	
6	2	Elizabeth Gill	Wales	24.8	
7	2	Valerie Parker	Canada	25.0	
8	2	Lorna McGarvey	Northern Ireland	25.5	

=== Final ===
==== Wind speed ====
+1.0 m/s

Final results
Rank	Name	Nationality	Time	Notes
1st place, gold medalist(s)	Dianne Burge	Australia	23.73	
2nd place, silver medalist(s)	Jenny Lamy	Australia	23.86	
3rd place, bronze medalist(s)	Irene Piotrowski	Canada	23.92	
4	Judy Pollock	Australia	24.14	
5	Joyce Bennett	Australia	24.16	
6	Una Morris	Jamaica	24.3	
7	Vilma Charlton	Jamaica	24.4	
8	Janet Simpson	England	24.6	
