= Australia at the 1966 British Empire and Commonwealth Games =

- CGF code: AUS
- CGA: Australian Commonwealth Games Association

in Kingston, Jamaica
- Competitors: 101 in 10 sports
- Flag bearers: Opening: David Dickson; Closing:
- Officials: 23
- Medals Ranked 2nd: Gold 23 Silver 28 Bronze 22 Total 73

British Empire and Commonwealth Games appearances
- 1930; 1934; 1938; 1950; 1954; 1958; 1962; 1966; 1970; 1974; 1978; 1982; 1986; 1990; 1994; 1998; 2002; 2006; 2010; 2014; 2018; 2022; 2026; 2030

Australia competed at the 1966 British Empire and Commonwealth Games in Kingston, Jamaica, from 4 to 13 August 1966. It was Australia's eighth appearance at the Commonwealth Games, having competed at every Games since their inception in 1930.

Australia won medals in nine of the ten sports that it entered.

== Medallists ==
The following Australian competitors won medals at the games.

Medal	Name	Sport	Event
Gold	Noel Clough	Athletics	Men's 880 yards
Gold	Ken Roche	Athletics	Men's 440 yards hurdles
Gold	Lawrie Peckham	Athletics	Men's high jump
Gold	Trevor Bickle	Athletics	Men's pole vault
Gold	Dianne Burge	Athletics	Women's 100 yards
Gold	Dianne Burge	Athletics	Women's 220 yards
Gold	Judy Pollock	Athletics	Women's 440 yards
Gold	Pam Kilborn	Athletics	Women's 80 metres hurdles
Gold	Jenny Lamy; Pam Kilborn; Joyce Bennett; Dianne Burge	Athletics	Women's 4 × 110 yards relay
Gold	Michele Brown	Athletics	Women's high jump
Gold	Margaret Parker	Athletics	Women's javelin throw
Gold	Michael Wenden	Swimming	Men's 110 yards Freestyle
Gold	Bob Windle	Swimming	Men's 440 yards Freestyle
Gold	Ron Jackson	Swimming	Men's 1650 yards Freestyle
Gold	Peter Reynolds	Swimming	Men's 110 yards Backstroke
Gold	Peter Reynolds	Swimming	Men's 220 yards Backstroke
Gold	Ian O'Brien	Swimming	Men's 110 yards Breaststroke
Gold	Ian O'Brien	Swimming	Men's 220 yards Breaststroke
Gold	Peter Reynolds	Swimming	Men's 440 yards Individual Medley
Gold	David Dickson; John Ryan; Mike Wenden; Bob Windle	Swimming	Men's 4×110 yards Freestyle Relay
Gold	David Dickson; Mike Wenden; Peter Reynolds; Bob Windle	Swimming	Men's 4×220 yards Freestyle Relay
Gold	Kathy Wainright	Swimming	Women's 440 yards Freestyle
Gold	George Vakakis	Weightlifting	Men's Light Heavyweight
Silver	Ron Clarke	Athletics	Men's 3 miles
Silver	Ron Clarke	Athletics	Men's 6 miles
Silver	Kerry O'Brien	Athletics	Men's 3000 metres steeplechase
Silver	Nick Birks	Athletics	Men's javelin throw
Silver	Jenny Lamy	Athletics	Women's 220 yards
Silver	Judy Pollock	Athletics	Women's 880 yards
Silver	Jean Roberts	Athletics	Women's discus throw
Silver	Anna Bocson	Athletics	Women's javelin throw
Silver	Darryl Norwood	Boxing	Men's Bantamweight
Silver	Phillip Watts Bristow-Stagg	Cycling	Men's Time Trial
Silver	John Bylsma	Cycling	Men's Individual Pursuit
Silver	Hilton Clarke	Cycling	Men's 10 miles Scatch
Silver	Don Wagstaff	Diving	Men's 3m Springboard
Silver	Don Wagstaff	Diving	Men's 10m Platform
Silver	Robyn Bradshaw	Diving	Women's 10m Platform
Silver	Barry Wasley Brian McCowage John Humphreys Russell Hobby	Fencing	Men's Foil Team
Silver	Brian McCowage Gabor Arato Laszlo Tornallyay	Fencing	Men's Sabre Team
Silver	Jeanette Beauchamp Melody Coleman Walburga Winter	Fencing	Women's Foil Team
Silver	Michael Papps	Shooting	Men's Rapid Fire Pistol
Silver	John Bennett	Swimming	Men's 440 yards Freestyle
Silver	Graham Dunn	Swimming	Men's 110 yards Butterfly
Silver	Brett Hill	Swimming	Men's 220 yards Butterfly
Silver	Lynette Bell	Swimming	Women's 110 yards Freestyle
Silver	Jenny Thorn	Swimming	Women's 440 yards Freestyle
Silver	Janet Steinbeck Jan Murphy Lynette Bell Marion Smith	Swimming	Women's 4×110 yards Freestyle Relay
Silver	Jan Murphy	Swimming	Women's 440 yards Individual Medley
Silver	Arthur Shannos	Weightlifting	Men's Heavyweight
Silver	Kevin McGrath	Wrestling	Men's Bantamweight
Bronze	Gary Eddy; Allen Crawley; Gary Holdsworth; Peter Norman	Athletics	Men's 4 × 110 yards relay
Bronze	Robyn Woodhouse	Athletics	Women's high jump
Bronze	John Rakowski	Boxing	Men's Flyweight
Bronze	Bryan Knoche	Boxing	Men's Light Welterweight
Bronze	Dennis Booth	Boxing	Men's Light Heavyweight
Bronze	Richard Hine	Cycling	Men's Time Trial
Bronze	Richard Hine	Cycling	Men's Individual Pursuit
Bronze	Daryl Perkins	Cycling	Men's Sprint
Bronze	Chris Robb	Diving	Men's 3m Springboard
Bronze	Chris Robb	Diving	Men's 10m Platform
Bronze	Susan Knight	Diving	Women's 3m Springboard
Bronze	Barry Wasley; John Humphreys; Peter Hardiman; Russell Hobby	Fencing	Men's Épée Team
Bronze	Gabor Arato	Fencing	Men's Sabre
Bronze	John Murphy	Shooting	Men's Small Bore Rifle
Bronze	David Dickson	Swimming	Men's 110 yards Freestyle
Bronze	Karl Byron	Swimming	Men's 220 yards Backstroke
Bronze	Jan Murphy	Swimming	Women's 110 yards Freestyle
Bronze	Kim Herford	Swimming	Women's 440 yards Freestyle
Bronze	Heather Saville	Swimming	Women's 110 yards Breaststroke
Bronze	Allyson Mabb; Heather Saville; Jill Pauline Groeger Lynette Bell	Swimming	Women's 4×110 yards Medley Relay
Bronze	Russell Pery	Weightlifting	Men's Middleweight
Bronze	Michael Benarik	Wrestling	Men's Middleweight

Medals by sport
Sport	1st place, gold medalist(s)	2nd place, silver medalist(s)	3rd place, bronze medalist(s)	
Swimming	11	7	6	23
Athletics	11	8	2	21
Weightlifting	1	1	1	3
Cycling	0	3	3	6
Diving	0	3	3	6
Fencing	0	3	2	5
Boxing	0	1	3	4
Shooting	0	1	1	2
Wrestling	0	1	1	2
Total	23	28	22	73

== Officials ==
Commandant & General Manager: Bill Young
Assistant General Manager: Arthur Tunstall
Team Secretary: David McKenzie
Attache & Medical Officer: Dr Roger Parrish
Physiotherapists: Leslie Bridges, Thomas Dobson
Section Officials: Athletics Manager – Frederick Humphreys, Athletics Manageress – Mary Breen, Athletics Coaches – Kevin Dynan, Jack Pross; Badminton Competitor/Manager – Kenneth Turner; Boxing Manager/Coach – Harold Napper; Cyycling Manager – Charles Manins, Cycling Coach/Trainer – Harry Browne; Fencing Coach/Manager – Ivan Lund; Shooting Competitor/Manager – James Kirkwood; Swimming Manager – Ray McNamara, Swimming Manageresss – Leah Phillips, Swimming Men's Coach – Don Talbot, Swimming Women's Coach – Terry Gathercole; Diving Coach – Jack Barnett; Weightlifting Manager/Coach – Les Martyn; Wrestling Manager/Coach – Hugh Williams

== See also ==
- Australia at the 1964 Summer Olympics
- Australia at the 1968 Summer Olympics
