= Athletics at the 1968 Summer Olympics – Women's 100 metres =

Women's 100 metres at the Games of the XIX Olympiad
- Venue: Estadio Olímpico Universitario
- Date: October 14–15, 1968
- Competitors: 42 from 22 nations
- Winning time: 11.0 WR

Medalists
1st place, gold medalist(s)		Wyomia Tyus	United States
2nd place, silver medalist(s)		Barbara Ferrell	United States
3rd place, bronze medalist(s)		Irena Szewińska	Poland

Official Video on YouTube

The women's 100 metres competition at the 1968 Summer Olympics in Mexico City, Mexico. The event was held at the University Olympic Stadium on October 14–15.

The race was won by defending champion Wyomia Tyus. She became the first person to defend the championship at 100 metres, a feat later duplicated by Carl Lewis, Gail Devers, Shelly-Ann Fraser-Pryce, Usain Bolt and Elaine Thompson-Herah. Director Bud Greenspan filmed Tyus casually dancing behind her starting blocks before the Olympic final. When interviewed later she said she was doing the "Tighten Up" to stay loose. American commentator Dwight Stones suggests this intimidated her opponents.

In the final, American teenager Margaret Bailes gained a step advantage at the gun. That quickly disappeared as Tyus seized control of the race. The chase was on. The next chasers appeared to be her American teammate Barbara Ferrell and Australian teenager Raelene Boyle. Coming on strong toward the finish was Polish veteran Irena Kirszenstein. Tyus dipped at the finish, but there was nobody near her. Ferrell and Boyle were escorted to the holding area, but Officials reading the new fully automatic time system corrected the results to declare Kirszenstein the bronze medalist. Tyus set the world record while Boyle set the List of world junior record in fourth place.

Tyus was credited with 11.0 hand timed, breaking the tie at 11.1 with several women in this race. Two years later, Chi Cheng, 7th place in this race, equalled her time. Her automatic time of 11.07 was the first noted automatic time record of this event. In the subsequent Olympics, that time was equalled by Renate Stecher, but Tyus' time was downgraded to 11.08. By the time fully automatic timing became mandatory, January 1, 1977, Annegret Richter's 11.01 from the 1976 Olympics had displaced them.

== Competition format ==
The women's 100m competition consisted of heats (Round 1), quarterfinals, semifinals and a Final. The five fastest competitors from each race in the heats qualified for the quarterfinals. The four fastest runners from each of the quarterfinal races advanced to the semifinals, where again the top four from each race advance to the final.

== Records ==
Prior to this competition, the existing world and Olympic records were as follows:

World record	Irena Szewińska (POL)	11.1	Prague, Czechoslovakia	July 9, 1965
Olympic record	Wyomia Tyus (USA)	11.2	Tokyo, Japan	October 15, 1964

== Results ==
=== Heats ===
==== Heat 1 ====
Wind: 0.0 m/s

Rank	Athlete	Nation	Time (hand)	Time (automatic)	Notes
1	Wyomia Tyus	United States	11.2	11.21	Q
2	Val Peat	Great Britain	11.5	11.52	Q
3	Violetta Quesada	Cuba	11.6	11.67	Q
4	Marijana Lubej	Yugoslavia	11.6	11.68	Q
5	Debbie Miller	Canada	11.7	11.71	Q
6	Sylviane Telliez	France	12.0	12.10	
7	Esperanza Girón	Mexico	12.2	12.30	

==== Heat 2 ====
Wind: +1.3 m/s

Rank	Athlete	Nation	Time (hand)	Time (automatic)	Notes
1	Margaret Bailes	United States	11.2	11.30	Q
2	Irene Piotrowski	Canada	11.3	11.40	Q
3	Miguelina Cobián	Cuba	11.4	11.48	Q
4	Pam Kilborn	Australia	11.6	11.62	Q
5	Gabrielle Meyer	France	11.6	11.65	Q
6	Alicia Kaufmanas	Argentina	11.8	11.90	
7	Carmen Smith	Jamaica	11.9	11.94	

==== Heat 3 ====
Wind: +0.1 m/s

Rank	Athlete	Nation	Time (hand)	Time (automatic)	Notes
1	Dianne Bowering-Burge	Australia	11.5	11.53	Q
2	Fulgencia Romay	Cuba	11.5	11.53	Q
3	Lyudmila Samotyosova	Soviet Union	11.5	11.57	Q
4	Anita Neil	Great Britain	11.6	11.70	Q
5	Oyeronke Akindele	Nigeria	11.6	11.70	Q
6	Vilma Charlton	Jamaica	11.7	11.71	
7	Ulla-Britt Wieslander	Sweden	11.8	11.86	

==== Heat 4 ====
Wind: 0.0 m/s

Rank	Athlete	Nation	Time (hand)	Time (automatic)	Notes
1	Irena Szewińska	Poland	11.3	11.32	Q
2	Raelene Boyle	Australia	11.4	11.44	Q
3	Chi Cheng	Taiwan	11.4	11.45	Q
4	Della James	Great Britain	11.7	11.78	Q
5	Karin Reichert-Frisch	West Germany	11.9	11.95	Q
6	Mária Kiss	Hungary	12.0	12.10	
—	Lydia Stephens	Kenya	DNF		

==== Heat 5 ====
Wind: 0.0 m/s

Rank	Athlete	Nation	Time (hand)	Time (automatic)	Notes
1	Eva Glesková	Czechoslovakia	11.6	11.62	Q
2	Renate Meyer	West Germany	11.7	11.71	Q
3	Lyudmila Golomazova	Soviet Union	11.7	11.74	Q
4	Truus Hennipman	Netherlands	11.7	11.76	Q
5	Stephanie Berto	Canada	11.8	11.81	Q
6	Margit Nemesházi	Hungary	11.9	12.00	
7	Josefa Vicent	Uruguay	12.5	12.53	

==== Heat 6 ====
Wind: 0.0 m/s

Rank	Athlete	Nation	Time (hand)	Time (automatic)	Notes
1	Barbara Ferrell	United States	11.2	11.28	Q
2	Lyudmila Maslakova	Soviet Union	11.5	11.54	Q
3	Wilma van Gool-van den Berg	Netherlands	11.5	11.60	Q
4	Olajumoke Bodunrin	Nigeria	11.6	11.71	Q
5	Györgyi Balogh	Hungary	11.8	11.80	Q
6	Halina Górecka	West Germany	11.8	11.88	
7	Cecilia Sosa	El Salvador	13.7	13.76	

=== Quarterfinals ===
==== Quarterfinal 1 ====
Wind: +0.6 m/s

Rank	Athlete	Nation	Time (hand)	Time (automatic)	Notes
1	Barbara Ferrell	United States	11.1	11.12	Q
2	Eva Glesková	Czechoslovakia	11.2	11.29	Q
3	Della James	Great Britain	11.3	11.36	Q
4	Miguelina Cobián	Cuba	11.4	11.41	Q
5	Lyudmila Maslakova	Soviet Union	11.4	11.43	
6	Pam Kilborn	Australia	11.4	11.50	
7	Truus Hennipman	Netherlands	11.5	11.59	
8	Karin Reichert-Frisch	West Germany	11.6	11.70	

==== Quarterfinal 2 ====
Wind: +2.7 m/s

Rank	Athlete	Nation	Time (hand)	Time (automatic)	Notes
1	Wyomia Tyus	United States	11.0	11.08	Q
2	Chi Cheng	Taiwan	11.3	11.31	Q
3	Wilma van Gool-van den Berg	Netherlands	11.4	11.45	Q
4	Lyudmila Golomazova	Soviet Union	11.5	11.54	Q
5	Marijana Lubej	Yugoslavia	11.6	11.61	
6	Anita Neil	Great Britain	11.6	11.61	
7	Debbie Miller	Canada	11.6	11.64	
	Olajumoke Bodunrin	Nigeria	DNS	–	

==== Quarterfinal 3 ====
Wind: +0.8 m/s

Rank	Athlete	Nation	Time (hand)	Time (automatic)	Notes
1	Raelene Boyle	Australia	11.2	11.29	Q, OR
2	Margaret Bailes	United States	11.3	11.34	Q
3	Val Peat	Great Britain	11.3	11.39	Q
4	Lyudmila Samotyosova	Soviet Union	11.4	11.45	Q
5	Violetta Quesada	Cuba	11.6	11.65	
6	Renate Meyer	West Germany	11.6	11.67	
7	Oyeronke Akindele	Nigeria	11.7	11.75	

==== Quarterfinal 4 ====
Wind: +1.8 m/s

Rank	Athlete	Nation	Time (hand)	Time (automatic)	Notes
1	Irena Szewińska	Poland	11.1	11.20	Q
2	Dianne Bowering-Burge	Australia	11.3	11.33	Q
3	Irene Piotrowski	Canada	11.3	11.41	Q
4	Fulgencia Romay	Cuba	11.4	11.47	Q
5	Gabrielle Meyer	France	11.6	11.69	
6	Györgyi Balogh	Hungary	11.7	11.78	
	Stephanie Berto	Canada	DNS	–	

=== Semi-finals ===
==== Semifinal 1 ====
Wind: -0.2 m/s

Rank	Athlete	Nation	Time (hand)	Time (automatic)	Notes
1	Irena Szewińska	Poland	11.3	11.30	Q
2	Barbara Ferrell	United States	11.3	11.37	Q
3	Dianne Bowering-Burge	Australia	11.4	11.46	Q
4	Chi Cheng	Taiwan	11.4	11.49	Q
5	Fulgencia Romay	Cuba	11.5	11.52	
6	Irene Piotrowski	Canada	11.5	11.55	
7	Della James	Great Britain	11.6	11.68	
8	Lyudmila Golomazova	Soviet Union	11.7	11.71	

==== Semifinal 2 ====
Wind: 0.0 m/s

Rank	Athlete	Nation	Time (hand)	Time (automatic)	Notes
1	Wyomia Tyus	United States	11.3	11.35	Q
2	Raelene Boyle	Australia	11.4	11.41	Q
3	Margaret Bailes	United States	11.5	11.53	Q
4	Miguelina Cobián	Cuba	11.6	11.63	Q
5	Lyudmila Samotyosova	Soviet Union	11.6	11.67	
6	Eva Glesková	Czechoslovakia	11.7	11.80	
7	Wilma van Gool-van den Berg	Netherlands	11.8	11.81	
8	Val Peat	Great Britain	11.8	11.81	

=== Final ===
Wind: +1.2 m/s

Rank	Athlete	Nation	Time (hand)	Time (automatic)	Notes
1st place, gold medalist(s)	Wyomia Tyus	United States	11.0	11.08	WR
2nd place, silver medalist(s)	Barbara Ferrell	United States	11.1	11.15	
3rd place, bronze medalist(s)	Irena Szewińska	Poland	11.1	11.19	
4	Raelene Boyle	Australia	11.1	11.20	WJR
5	Margaret Bailes	United States	11.3	11.37	
6	Dianne Bowering-Burge	Australia	11.4	11.44	
7	Chi Cheng	Taiwan	11.5	11.53	
8	Miguelina Cobián	Cuba	11.6	11.61	
