= Athletics at the 1966 British Empire and Commonwealth Games – Women's 4 × 110 yards relay =

Women's 4 × 110 yards relay at the 1966 British Empire and Commonwealth Games
- Venue: Independence Park, Kingston
- Dates: August 14, 1966

Medalists
gold medal	Jennifer Lamy, Pam Kilborn, Joyce Bennett, Dianne Burge	Australia
silver medal	Maureen Tranter, Janet Simpson, Daphne Slater, Jill Hall	England
bronze medal	Adlin Mair, Una Morris, Vilma Charlton, Carmen Smith	Jamaica

The women's 4 × 110 yards relay event at the 1966 British Empire and Commonwealth Games was held on 14 August at the Independence Park in Kingston, Jamaica. It was the last time that the imperial distance was contested at the Games: in 1970 it was replaced by the 4 × 100 metres relay.

== Results ==
Final results
Rank	Nation	Athletes	Time	Notes
1st place, gold medalist(s)	Australia	Jennifer Lamy, Pam Kilborn, Joyce Bennett, Dianne Burge	45.3	=GR
2nd place, silver medalist(s)	England	Maureen Tranter, Janet Simpson, Daphne Slater, Jill Hall	45.6	
3rd place, bronze medalist(s)	Jamaica	Adlin Mair, Una Morris, Vilma Charlton, Carmen Smith	45.6	
4	Canada	Valerie Parker, Marjorie Turner, Janet Maddin, Irene Piotrowski	45.9	
5	Wales	Liz Parsons, Gloria Dourass, Liz Gill, Thelwyn Appleby	46.2	
6	Trinidad and Tobago	Jocelyn Haynes, Octavia Straker, Sigrid Sandiford, Sybil Donmartin	47.4	
7	Nigeria	Maria Jinadu, Olajumoke Bodunrin, Oyeronke Akindele, Regina Okafor	47.9	
8	Sierra Leone	Marie Sesay, Millicent Jackson, Olive Palmer-Davies, Teresa Johnson	49.3	
