= Liz Gill =

Welsh athlete

Personal information
- Nationality: British (Welsh)

Sport
- Sport: Athletics
- Event: Sprints
- Club: Glamorgan C.o.E
Medal record
Representing Great Britain
Summer Universiade
Bronze medal – third place	1965 Budapest	100m
Bronze medal – third place	1965 Budapest	200m

Elizabeth Anne Gill married name Lewis is a former track and field athlete from Wales, who competed at the 1966 British Empire and Commonwealth Games (now Commonwealth Games).

== Biography ==
Gill attended the Glamorgan Training College, Barry and was part of their athletics team.

Gill won the 100 yards title at the 1965 AAA Indoor Championships. Coached by Ron Pickering, she was defeated by her rival Liz Parsons in the warm-up Invitation race for 1966 British Empire and Commonwealth Games.

She subsequently represented the 1966 Welsh team at the 1966 British Empire and Commonwealth Games in Kingston, Jamaica, participating in three events; the 100 yards, the 220 yards and the 4 × 110 yards relay, with Thelwyn Appleby, Gloria Dourass and Liz Parsons.

Shortly after the Games, Gill married Handel Lewis and participated under her married name thereafter.
