= Athletics at the 1966 British Empire and Commonwealth Games – Women's 100 yards =

Women's 100 yards at the Commonwealth Games
- Venue: Independence Park, Kingston
- Dates: August 6 and 8, 1966

Medalists
gold medal	Dianne Burge	Australia
silver medal	Irene Piotrowski	Canada
bronze medal	Jill Hall	England

The women's 100 yards event at the 1966 British Empire and Commonwealth Games was held on 6 and 8 August at the Independence Park in Kingston, Jamaica. It was the last time that the imperial distance was contested at the Games: in 1970 it was replaced by the 100 metres.

== Medalists ==
Medallists
Gold	Silver	Bronze
Dianne Burge; Australia	Irene Piotrowski; Canada	Jill Hall; England

== Results ==
=== Heats ===
==== Qualification for semifinals ====
The first 3 in each heat (Q) qualified directly for the semifinals.

==== Wind speed ====
Heat 1: ? m/s; Heat 2: 0.0 m/s; Heat 3: +0.4 m/s; Heat 4: +0.8 m/s; Heat 5: -0.5 m/s

Heats
Rank	Heat	Name	Nationality	Time	Notes
1	1	Daphne Slater	England	10.8	Q
2	1	Marjorie Turner	Canada	10.8	Q
3	1	Brenda Matthews	New Zealand	10.9	Q
4	1	Maria Jinadu	Nigeria	11.1	
5	1	Gloria Dourass	Wales	11.2	
6	1	Lydia Stephens	Kenya	11.6	
7	1	Thora Best	Trinidad and Tobago	11.6	
8	1	Marie Sesay	Sierra Leone	12.0	
1	2	Dianne Burge	Australia	10.65	Q
2	2	Elizabeth Parsons	Wales	11.0	Q
3	2	Valerie Parker	Canada	11.1	Q
4	2	Rose Hart	Ghana	11.1	
5	2	Olajumoke Bodunrin	Nigeria	11.2	
6	2	Alix Jamieson	Scotland	11.3	
7	2	Teresa Johnson	Sierra Leone	11.4	
8	2	Esther Maganga	Tanzania	11.8	
1	3	Irene Piotrowski	Canada	10.6	Q
2	3	Vilma Charlton	Jamaica	10.7	Q
3	3	Janet Simpson	England	10.8	Q
4	3	Pam Kilborn	Australia	11.01	
5	3	Regina Okafor	Nigeria	11.2	
6	3	Millicent Jackson	Sierra Leone	12.3	
1	4	Jenny Lamy	Australia	10.93	Q
2	4	Jill Hall	England	10.9	Q
3	4	Sigrid Sandiford	Trinidad and Tobago	11.0	Q
4	4	Carmen Smith	Jamaica	11.0	
5	4	Oyeronke Akindele	Nigeria	11.1	
6	4	Thelwyn Appleby	Wales	11.3	
7	4	Alice Annum	Ghana	11.3	
8	4	Olive Palmer-Davies	Sierra Leone	11.7	
1	5	Joyce Bennett	Australia	10.95	Q
2	5	Maureen Tranter	England	11.0	Q
3	5	Adlin Mair	Jamaica	11.0	Q
4	1	Ana Ramacake	Fiji	11.1	
5	1	Elizabeth Gill	Wales	11.1	
6	1	Lorna McGarvey	Northern Ireland	11.2	
7	1	Sybil Donmartin	Trinidad and Tobago	11.5	

=== Semifinals ===
==== Qualification for final ====
The first 4 in each heat (Q) qualified directly for the final.

==== Wind speed ====
Heat 1: +0.1 m/s; Heat 2: +3.8 m/s

Semifinals results
Rank	Heat	Name	Nationality	Time	Notes
1	1	Dianne Burge	Australia	10.58	Q, GR
2	1	Vilma Charlton	Jamaica	10.6	Q
3	1	Jenny Lamy	Australia	10.82	Q
4	1	Daphne Slater	England	10.8	Q
5	1	Valerie Parker	Canada	10.8	
6	1	Brenda Matthews	New Zealand	10.8	
7	1	Elizabeth Parsons	Wales	11.0	
8	1	Maureen Tranter	England	11.1	
1	2	Irene Piotrowski	Canada	10.7	Q
2	2	Joyce Bennett	Australia	10.72	Q
3	2	Jill Hall	England	10.7	Q
4	2	Adlin Mair	Jamaica	10.8	Q
5	2	Janet Simpson	England	10.8	
6	2	Marjorie Turner	Canada	10.8	
7	2	Sigrid Sandiford	Trinidad and Tobago	11.0	

=== Final ===
==== Wind speed ====
0.0 m/s

Final results
Rank	Name	Nationality	Time	Notes
1st place, gold medalist(s)	Dianne Burge	Australia	10.6	
2nd place, silver medalist(s)	Irene Piotrowski	Canada	10.8	
3rd place, bronze medalist(s)	Jill Hall	England	10.8	
4	Jenny Lamy	Australia	10.8	
5	Joyce Bennett	Australia	10.8	
6	Vilma Charlton	Jamaica	10.9	
7	Adlin Mair	Jamaica	10.9	
8	Daphne Slater	England	11.0	
