= Athletics at the 1970 British Commonwealth Games – Women's 800 metres =

Women's 800 metres at the 1970 British Commonwealth Games
- Venue: Meadowbank Stadium, Edinburgh
- Dates: 24 and 25 July 1970

Medalists
| gold medal | Rosemary Stirling | Scotland |
| silver medal | Pat Lowe | England |
| bronze medal | Cheryl Peasley | Australia |

The women's 800 metres event at the 1970 British Commonwealth Games was held on 24 and 25 July 1970 at the Meadowbank Stadium in Edinburgh, Scotland. It was the first time that the metric distance was contested at the Games, replacing the 880 yards event.

The winning margin was 0.03 seconds which as of 2024 remains the narrowest winning margin in the women's 800 metres at these games.

== Medallists ==
Medallists
| Gold | Silver | Bronze |
|---|---|---|
| Rosemary Stirling; Scotland | Pat Lowe; England | Cheryl Peasley; Australia |

== Results ==
=== Heats ===
==== Qualification for final ====
The first 4 in each heat (Q) qualified directly for the final.

Heats results
| Rank | Heat | Name | Nationality | Time | Notes |
|---|---|---|---|---|---|
| 1 | 1 | Sheila Carey | England | 2:04.7 | Q |
| 2 | 1 | Rosemary Stirling | Scotland | 2:04.9 | Q |
| 3 | 1 | Cheryl Peasley | Australia | 2:05.05 | Q |
| 4 | 1 | Georgena Craig | Scotland | 2:05.8 | Q |
| 5 | 1 | Adrienne Smyth | Northern Ireland | 2:06.0 | |
| 6 | 1 | Anne Smith | New Zealand | 2:07.3 | |
| | 1 | Thelwyn Bateman | Wales | DNF | |
| | 1 | Cecilia Smith | Canada | DNF | |
| 1 | 2 | Pat Lowe | England | 2:07.0 | Q |
| 2 | 2 | Sylvia Potts | New Zealand | 2:07.4 | Q |
| 3 | 2 | Penny Werthner | Canada | 2:07.4 | Q |
| 4 | 2 | Gloria Dourass | Wales | 2:07.6 | Q |
| 5 | 2 | Thelma Fynn | Canada | 2:07.6 | |
| 6 | 2 | Mary Speedman | Scotland | 2:08.3 | |
| 7 | 2 | Norine Braithwaite | England | 2:08.5 | |
| 8 | 2 | Beverly Franklyn | Jamaica | 2:14.7 | |

=== Final ===
Final result
| Rank | Name | Nationality | Time | Notes |
|---|---|---|---|---|
| 1st place, gold medalist(s) | Rosemary Stirling | Scotland | 2:06.24 | |
| 2nd place, silver medalist(s) | Pat Lowe | England | 2:06.27 | |
| 3rd place, bronze medalist(s) | Cheryl Peasley | Australia | 2:06.33 | |
| 4 | Gloria Dourass | Wales | 2:08.6 | |
| 5 | Sylvia Potts | New Zealand | 2:09.7 | |
| 6 | Penny Werthner | Canada | 2:10.0 | |
| 7 | Georgena Craig | Scotland | 2:16.1 | |
| 8 | Sheila Carey | England | 2:18.5 | |
