= Athletics at the 1966 British Empire and Commonwealth Games – Women's 440 yards =

Women's 440 yards at the 1966 British Empire and Commonwealth Games
- Venue: Independence Park, Kingston
- Dates: August 6 and 8, 1966

Medalists
gold medal	Judy Pollock	Australia
silver medal	Deirdre Watkinson	England
bronze medal	Una Morris	Jamaica

The women's 440 yards event at the 1966 British Empire and Commonwealth Games was held on 6 and 8 August at the Independence Park in Kingston, Jamaica. It was the first and last time that this imperial distance was contested by women at the Games: in 1970 it was replaced by the 400 metres.

== Medalists ==
Medallists
Gold	Silver	Bronze
Judy Pollock; Australia	Deidre Watkinson; England	Una Morris; Jamaica

== Results ==
=== Heats ===
==== Qualification for final ====
The first 2 in each heat (Q) and the next 2 fastest (q) qualified for the final.

Heats results
Rank	Heat	Name	Nationality	Time	Notes
1	1	Lillian Board	England	54.7	Q
2	1	Cecilia Carter	Canada	54.7	Q
3	1	Rosemary Stirling	Scotland	55.0	q
4	1	Gloria Dourass	Wales	55.4	q
	1	Octavia Straker	Trinidad and Tobago	DNF	
	1	Ana Ramacake	Fiji	DNS	
1	2	Deidre Watkinson	England	55.1	Q
2	2	Janet Maddin	Canada	56.6	Q
3	2	Thelwyn Appleby	Wales	56.8	
4	2	Barbara Lyall	Scotland	57.0	
5	2	Pam Piercy	England	57.2	
6	2	Titi Adeleke	Nigeria	1:00.0	
1	3	Judy Pollock	Australia	52.91	Q
2	3	Una Morris	Jamaica	54.7	Q
3	3	Joy Grieveson	England	55.6	
4	3	Mary Rajamani	Malaysia	57.8	
5	3	Jocelyn Haynes	Trinidad and Tobago	57.9	
6	3	Lucene Prince	Antigua and Barbuda	1:03.8	

=== Final ===
Final results
Rank	Name	Nationality	Time	Notes
1st place, gold medalist(s)	Judy Pollock	Australia	53.0	
2nd place, silver medalist(s)	Deidre Watkinson	England	54.1	
3rd place, bronze medalist(s)	Una Morris	Jamaica	54.2	
4	Rosemary Stirling	Scotland	54.4	
5	Lillian Board	England	54.7	
6	Cecilia Carter	Canada	55.0	
7	Janet Maddin	Canada	55.3	
8	Gloria Dourass	Wales	55.5	
