= Liz Parsons =

Welsh athlete

Personal information
- Nationality: British (Welsh)
- Born: c.1945 Cardiff, Wales
- Died: July 2020 (aged 76)

Sport
- Sport: Athletics
- Event: Sprints
- Club: Roath Harriers, Cardiff

Elizabeth Parsons married name Liz Johns (1945 – July 2020) was a track and field athlete from Wales, who competed at the 1966 British Empire and Commonwealth Games (now Commonwealth Games).

== Biography ==
Parsons was a member of the Roath Harriers in Cardiff and aged 15 she won the 1960 Welsh title.

At the 1966 Welsh championships, she broke the Welsh 100 yards record, setting a time of 10.7sec in the semi final before winning the final and also set a championship record in winning the 220 yards. Coached by Ron Pickering, she defeated her rival Liz Gill in the warm-up Invitation race for the 1966 British Empire and Commonwealth Games.

She represented the 1966 Welsh team at the 1966 British Empire and Commonwealth Games in Kingston, Jamaica, participating in three events; the 100 yards, the 220 yards and the 4 × 110 yards relay, with Gloria Dourass, Thelwyn Appleby and Liz Gill.

Shortly after the Games, Parsons married Maurice Johns and participated under her married name thereafter.

In 1968, when Roath Harriers merged with Birchgrove Harriers to become Cardiff AAC, she was the first captain of the women's team.

After retiring from competitive athletics she became a coach and an official for Cardiff AAC. She died in July 2020 aged 76.
