= Athletics at the 1966 British Empire and Commonwealth Games – Women's 880 yards =

Women's 880 yards at the 1966 British Empire and Commonwealth Games
- Venue: Independence Park, Kingston
- Dates: August 11 and 13, 1966

Medalists
gold medal	Abby Hoffman	Canada
silver medal	Judy Pollock	Australia
bronze medal	Anne Smith	England

The women's 880 yards event at the 1966 British Empire and Commonwealth Games was held on 11 and 13 August at the Independence Park in Kingston, Jamaica. It was the last time that the imperial distance was contested at the Games: in 1970 it was replaced by the 800 metres.

== Medalists ==
Medallists
Gold	Silver	Bronze
Abby Hoffman; Canada	Judy Pollock; Australia	Anne Smith; England

== Results ==
=== Heats ===
==== Qualification for final ====
The first 4 in each heat (Q) qualified directly for the final.

Heats results
Rank	Heat	Name	Nationality	Time	Notes
1	1	Marise Stephen	New Zealand	2:06.6	Q
2	1	Anne Smith	England	2:07.2	Q
3	1	Rosemary Stirling	Scotland	2:07.6	Q
4	1	Abby Hoffman	Canada	2:08.8	Q
5	1	Deidre Watkinson	England	2:09.3	
6	1	Titi Adeleke	Nigeria	2:19.5	
	1	Lucene Prince	Antigua and Barbuda	DNF	
1	2	Pam Piercy	England	2:10.0	Q
2	2	Pat Lowe	England	2:10.0	Q
3	2	Judy Pollock	Australia	2:10.5	Q
4	2	Cecilia Carter	Canada	2:10.7	Q
5	2	Georgena Craig	Scotland	2:10.9	
6	2	Mary Rajamani	Malaysia	2:17.8	

=== Final ===
Final results
Rank	Name	Nationality	Time	Notes
1st place, gold medalist(s)	Abby Hoffman	Canada	2:04.3	
2nd place, silver medalist(s)	Judy Pollock	Australia	2:04.5	
3rd place, bronze medalist(s)	Anne Smith	England	2:05.0	
4	Rosemary Stirling	Scotland	2:05.4	
5	Pat Lowe	England	2:05.8	
6	Marise Stephen	New Zealand	2:05.9	
7	Pam Piercy	England	2:06.3	
8	Cecilia Carter	Canada	2:13.1	
