= Athletics at the 1963 South Pacific Games =

Athletics at the I South Pacific Games
- Dates: 30 August - 2 September
- Host city: Suva, Fiji
- Venue: Buckhurst Park
- Level: Senior
- Events: 29 (19 men, 10 women)

Athletics competitions at the 1963 South Pacific Games were held at the Buckhurst Park in Suva, Fiji, between 30 August and 2 September 1963.

A total of 29 events were contested, 19 by men and 10 by women.

== Medal summary ==
Medal winners and their results were published on the Athletics Weekly webpage courtesy of Tony Isaacs and Børre Lilloe, and on the Oceania Athletics Association webpage by Bob Snow.

=== Men ===
Event	Gold		Silver		Bronze	
100 metres	Jacques Pothin (NCL)	10.6	Kiniviliame Nalatu (FIJ)	10.9	Christian Kaddour (NCL)	11.1
200 metres	Christian Kaddour (NCL)	22.3	Apisai Nabou (FIJ)	22.4	Bruce Richter (PNG)	22.6
400 metres	Charles Harrison (PNG)	49.7	Waituka Maina (PNG)	49.9	Amani Racule (FIJ)	50.4
800 metres	Mike Joyce (PNG)	2:02.4	Sekove Naivalurua (FIJ)	2:02.7	Sitiveni Rokovesa (FIJ)	2:03.0
1500 metres	Samuiela Tuifangaloka (TGA)	4:23.4	Mike Joyce (PNG)	4:25.0	Sitiveni Rokovesa (FIJ)	4:25.4
5000 metres	Mike Joyce (PNG)	17:16.6	(New Zealand) Kau Pupa (COK)	17:28.6	Ken Gould (FIJ)	17:28.8
10000 metres	Viliame Saulekaleka (FIJ)	36:39.8	(Gilbert and Ellice Islands) Tara Mango (GEI)	36:46.2	Ken Gould (FIJ)	37:07.8
3000 metres steeplechase	Jean-Pierre Aifa (NCL)	10:23.8	Viliame Saulekaleka (FIJ)	10:47.0	Samisoni Ratuyawa (FIJ)	11:14.0
110 metres hurdles	Charles Tetaria (PYF)	15.6	Kalolo Pale (TGA)	16.2	Robin Mitchell (FIJ)	17.1
400 metres hurdles	Osea Malamala (FIJ)	59.5	Graeme Southwick (FIJ)	59.7	Paul Martin (PYF)	60.9
High jump	Edward Laboran (PNG)	1.90	Tevita Kabakoro (FIJ)	1.805	Nypiengo Passa (NCL)	1.805
Pole vault	Alipeti Latu (TGA)	3.505	(New Hebrides) / (New Hebrides) Jack Waewo (NHB)	3.505	Otto Malatana (PNG)	3.43
Long jump	Christian Kaddour (NCL)	6.98	Jacques Pothin (NCL)	6.565	Charles Tetaria (PYF)	6.51
Triple jump	Christian Kaddour (NCL)	14.23	Tevita Kabakoro (FIJ)	14.05	Samivela Latu (TGA)	13.37
Shot put	Mesulame Rakuro (FIJ)	14.49	Adonio Tokawa (NCL)	13.89	Petelo Wakalina (NCL)	13.48
Discus throw	Mesulame Rakuro (FIJ)	49.35	Koroiwale Vatanimotu (FIJ)	39.77	André Hulot (NCL)	38.43
Javelin throw	Ivaharia Oe (PNG)	61.08	Penisio Munanao (NCL)	59.88	William Liga (FIJ)	59.70
4 x 100 metres relay	Papua and New Guinea	42.8	New Caledonia	43.1	Fiji	43.3
4 x 400 metres relay	Papua and New Guinea	3:24.3	Fiji	3:26.1	New Caledonia	3:31.4

=== Women ===
Event	Gold		Silver		Bronze	
100 metres	Ana Ramacake (FIJ)	12.2	Maca Vakalala (FIJ)	12.3	Eleanor Phillips (FIJ)	12.5
200 metres	Maca Vakalala (FIJ)	26.3	Ana Ramacake (FIJ)	26.4	Eleanor Phillips (FIJ)	26.7
800 metres	Géraldine Bigourd (NCL)	2:28.0	Litia Lotu (FIJ)	2:33.0	Asenaca Vani Serukalou (FIJ)	2:40.0
80 metres hurdles	Hélène Sarciaux (PYF)	12.8	Eleanor Phillips (FIJ)	13.1	Ana Ramacake (FIJ)	13.7
High jump	Margaret Woodhouse (FIJ)	1.47	Eleanor Phillips (FIJ)	1.45	Hélène Sarciaux (PYF)	1.40
Long jump	Kalisi Kuruvoli (FIJ)	5.51	Ana Ramacake (FIJ)	5.42	Maca Vakalala (FIJ)	4.78
Shot put	Merewai Turukawa (FIJ)	11.45	Maeva Tetuaiva (PYF)	10.11	Victoria Pua (SAM)	9.97
Discus throw	Merewai Turukawa (FIJ)	35.27	Solange David (PYF)	33.23	Danielle Tanc (NCL)	29.93
Javelin throw	Merewai Turukawa (FIJ)	36.59	Ivaroa Haro (PNG)	32.06	Laite Nadumu (FIJ)	31.76
4 x 100 metres relay	Fiji	50.0				

== Medal table (unofficial) ==
* Host nation (Fiji)

Rank	Nation	Gold	Silver	Bronze	Total
1	Fiji (FIJ)*	12	15	15	42
2	Papua and New Guinea	7	3	2	12
3	New Caledonia (NCL)	6	4	6	16
4	French Polynesia (PYF)	2	2	3	7
5	Tonga (TON)	2	1	1	4
6	Cook Islands (COK)	0	1	0	1
6	Gilbert and Ellice Islands	0	1	0	1
6	New Hebrides (New Hebrides)	0	1	0	1
9	Western Samoa (WSM)	0	0	1	1
Totals (9 entries)		29	28	28	85

== Participation (unofficial) ==
At least 9 of 13 participating countries were present at the athletics events.

- (New Zealand) Cook Islands
- Fiji
- French Polynesia
- Gilbert and Ellice Islands
- New Caledonia
- New Hebrides
- Papua and New Guinea
- Tonga
- Western Samoa
