= Athletics at the 1970 British Commonwealth Games – Women's 400 metres =

Athletics event

Women's 400 metres at the 1970 British Commonwealth Games
- Venue: Meadowbank Stadium, Edinburgh
- Dates: 22 and 23 July 1970

Medalists
gold medal	Marilyn Neufville	Jamaica
silver medal	Sandra Brown	Australia
bronze medal	Judith Ayaa	Uganda

The women's 400 metres event at the 1970 British Commonwealth Games was held on 22 and 23 July at the Meadowbank Stadium in Edinburgh, Scotland. It was the first time that the metric distance was contested at the Games, replacing the 440 yards event.

The winning margin was 2.64 seconds which as of 2024 remains the only time the women's 400 metres was won by more than two seconds at these games.

== Medallists ==
Medallists
Gold	Silver	Bronze
Marilyn Neufville; Jamaica	Sandra Brown; Australia	Judith Ayaa; Uganda

== Results ==
=== Heats ===
==== Qualification for final ====
The first 4 in each semifinal heat (Q) qualified directly for the final.

Semifinal heats result
Rank	Heat	Name	Nationality	Time	Notes
1	1	Marilyn Neufville	Jamaica	53.0	Q
2	1	Jannette Champion	England	54.9	Q
3	1	Avril Beattie	Scotland	55.1	Q
4	1	Maeve Kyle	Northern Ireland	55.3	Q
5	1	Cecilia Smith	Canada	55.5	
6	1	Heather McKay	Canada	59.1	
1	2	Judith Ayaa	Uganda	52.8	Q
2	2	Sandra Brown	Australia	53.8	Q
3	2	Avril Bowring	England	54.1	Q
4	2	Barbara Lyall	Scotland	54.1	Q
5	2	Maureen Tranter	England	54.3	
6	2	Joyce Sadowick	Canada	55.2	
7	2	Beverly Franklyn	Jamaica	57.2	
	2	Alice Annum	Ghana	DNS	

=== Final ===
Rank	Name	Nationality	Time	Notes
1st place, gold medalist(s)	Marilyn Neufville	Jamaica	51.02	WR
2nd place, silver medalist(s)	Sandra Brown	Australia	53.66	
3rd place, bronze medalist(s)	Judith Ayaa	Uganda	53.77	
4	Jannette Champion	England	54.2	
5	Barbara Lyall	Scotland	54.7	
6	Avril Bowring	England	54.7	
7	Avril Beattie	Scotland	54.8	
8	Maeve Kyle	Northern Ireland	55.7	
