= Athletics at the 1970 Summer Universiade – Women's 200 metres =

Athletics event

The women's 200 metres event at the 1970 Summer Universiade was held at the Stadio Comunale in Turin on 4 and 5 September 1970.

== Medalists ==
| Gold | Silver | Bronze |
|---|---|---|
| Renate Meißner; East Germany | Györgyi Balogh; Hungary | Wilma van den Berg; Netherlands |

== Results ==
=== Heats ===
Held on 4 September

| Rank | Heat | Athlete | Nationality | Time | Notes |
|---|---|---|---|---|---|
| 1 | 1 | Renate Meißner | East Germany | 24.0 | Q |
| 2 | 1 | Danuta Straszyńska | Poland | 24.4 | Q |
| 3 | 1 | Michèle Alayrangues | France | 25.2 | Q |
| 4 | 1 | Judy Murphy | United States | 25.2 | q |
| 5 | 1 | Elizabeth Sama | Nigeria | 25.7 | |
| 1 | 2 | Wilma van den Berg | Netherlands | 23.8 | Q |
| 2 | 2 | Marina Nikiforova | Soviet Union | 24.0 | Q |
| 3 | 2 | Judit Szabóné Havas | Hungary | 24.0 | Q |
| 4 | 2 | Linda Reynolds | United States | 24.9 | q |
| 5 | 2 | Helga Überrück | West Germany | 25.1 | q |
| 6 | 2 | Carolina Rieuwpassa | Indonesia | 25.3 | |
| 7 | 2 | Bosede Osiname | Nigeria | 26.4 | |
| 1 | 3 | Miguelina Cobián | Cuba | 24.0 | Q |
| 2 | 3 | Della Pascoe | Great Britain | 24.1 | Q |
| 3 | 3 | Lyudmila Golomazova | Soviet Union | 24.2 | Q |
| 4 | 3 | Helga Kapfer | Austria | 24.5 | q |
| 5 | 3 | Monka Bobcheva | Bulgaria | 25.3 | |
| 6 | 3 | Jos Rademaker | Netherlands | 25.3 | |
| 1 | 4 | Györgyi Balogh | Hungary | 24.3 | Q |
| 2 | 4 | Jean O'Neill | Great Britain | 24.7 | Q |
| 3 | 4 | Hannelore Groh | West Germany | 25.1 | Q |

=== Semifinals ===
Held on 5 September

| Rank | Heat | Athlete | Nationality | Time | Notes |
|---|---|---|---|---|---|
| 1 | 1 | Wilma van den Berg | Netherlands | 23.7 | Q |
| 2 | 1 | Györgyi Balogh | Hungary | 23.9 | Q |
| 3 | 1 | Della Pascoe | Great Britain | 24.2 | Q |
| 4 | 1 | Danuta Straszyńska | Poland | 24.4 | Q |
| 5 | 1 | Linda Reynolds | United States | 24.8 | |
| 6 | 1 | Hannelore Groh | West Germany | 25.1 | |
| 7 | 1 | Michèle Alayrangues | France | 25.5 | |
| | 1 | Marina Nikiforova | Soviet Union | DNF | Q |
| 1 | 2 | Renate Meißner | East Germany | 23.4 | Q |
| 2 | 2 | Judit Szabóné Havas | Hungary | 23.8 | Q |
| 3 | 2 | Miguelina Cobián | Cuba | 24.0 | Q |
| 4 | 2 | Helga Kapfer | Austria | 24.2 | Q |
| 5 | 2 | Jean O'Neill | Great Britain | 24.8 | |
| 6 | 2 | Helga Überrück | West Germany | 25.3 | |
| 7 | 2 | Judy Murphy | United States | 25.7 | |
| | 2 | Lyudmila Golomazova | Soviet Union | DNF | Q |

=== Final ===
Held on 5 September

| Rank | Name | Nationality | Time | Notes |
|---|---|---|---|---|
| 1st place, gold medalist(s) | Renate Meißner | East Germany | 22.7 | UR |
| 2nd place, silver medalist(s) | Györgyi Balogh | Hungary | 23.2 | |
| 3rd place, bronze medalist(s) | Wilma van den Berg | Netherlands | 23.5 | |
| 4 | Miguelina Cobián | Cuba | 23.7 | |
| 5 | Judit Szabóné Havas | Hungary | 23.7 | |
| 6 | Helga Kapfer | Austria | 23.8 | |
| 7 | Della Pascoe | Great Britain | 24.0 | |
| 8 | Danuta Straszyńska | Poland | 24.3 | |
