= Athletics at the 1967 Summer Universiade – Women's 4 × 100 metres relay =

The women's 4 × 100 metres relay event at the 1967 Summer Universiade was held at the National Olympic Stadium in Tokyo on 4 September 1967.

== Results ==
Rank	Nation	Athletes	Time	Notes
1st place, gold medalist(s)	France	Anne-Marie Grosse, Françoise Masse, Michèle Alayrangues, Gabrielle Meyer	46.5	
2nd place, silver medalist(s)	Japan	Miho Sato, Ritsuko Sukegawa, Miyoko Tsujishita, Ayoko Natsume	46.5	
3rd place, bronze medalist(s)	West Germany	Bärbel Palmi, Marlies Fünfstück, Gabriele Großekettler, Gerlinde Beyrichen	46.8	
4	Great Britain	Maureen Barton, Angela Birch, Jannette Champion, Sheila Parkin	47.4	
5	Austria	Ilona Gusenbauer, Helga Kapfer, Liese Prokop, ?	49.6	
