= Masters W35 800 metres world record progression =

This is the progression of world record improvements of the 800 metres W35 division of Masters athletics.

Key

Incomplete information Pending

| Hand | Auto | Athlete | Nationality | Birthdate | Location | Date |
|---|---|---|---|---|---|---|
| | 1:56.53 | Lyubov Gurina | Russia | 06.08.1957 | Hechtel | 30.07.1994 |
| | 1:57.39 | Ileana Silai | Romania | 14.10.1941 | Bucharest | 28.08.1977 |
| | 1:59.93 | Judy Pollock | Australia | 25.06.1940 | Montreal | 14.07.1976 |
