= Athletics at the 1966 British Empire and Commonwealth Games – Women's long jump =

Women's long jump at the 1966 British Empire and Commonwealth Games
- Venue: Independence Park, Kingston
- Dates: August 13, 1966

Medalists
gold medal	Mary Rand	England
silver medal	Sheila Parkin	England
bronze medal	Violet Odogwu	Nigeria

The women's long jump event at the 1966 British Empire and Commonwealth Games was held on 13 August at the Independence Park in Kingston, Jamaica.

== Results ==
Final results
Rank	Name	Nationality	Distance	Notes
1st place, gold medalist(s)	Mary Rand	England	20 ft 10 1/2 in (6.36 m)	
2nd place, silver medalist(s)	Sheila Parkin	England	20 ft 8 in (6.30 m)	
3rd place, bronze medalist(s)	Violet Odogwu	Nigeria	20 ft 2 1/4 in (6.15 m)	
4	Alix Jamieson	Scotland	19 ft 10 1/2 in (6.06 m)	
5	Helen Frith	Australia	19 ft 7 1/4 in (5.98 m)	
6	Jenny Wingerson	Canada	19 ft 2 1/2 in (5.85 m)	
7	Pam Kilborn	Australia	19 ft 1 in (5.82 m)	
8	Catherine Chapman	Canada	18 ft 11 1/4 in (5.77 m)	
9	Ann Wilson	England	18 ft 9 1/4 in (5.72 m)	
10	Gwenda Hurst	England	18 ft 5 1/2 in (5.63 m)	
11	Alice Annum	Ghana	18 ft 5 1/4 in (5.62 m)	
12	Althea Callender	Barbados	18 ft 3 in (5.56 m)	
13	Beverley Welsh	Jamaica	17 ft 11 in (5.46 m)	
14	Cynthia Smith	Jamaica	17 ft 10 1/2 in (5.45 m)	
15	Ana Ramacake	Fiji	16 ft 9 3/4 in (5.12 m)	
16	Esther Maganga	Tanzania	15 ft 10 1/4 in (4.83 m)	
17	Annette Simmonds	Antigua and Barbuda	13 ft 10 3/4 in (4.24 m)	
	Carmen Smith	Jamaica	DNS	
