= 1966 European Athletics Championships – Women's 100 metres =

Women's 100 metres at the 1966 European Athletics Championships
- Venue: Népstadion
- Location: Budapest
- Dates: 30 August (heats); 31 August (semifinals & final)
- Competitors: 23 from 10 nations
- Winning time: 11.5

Medalists
gold medal	Ewa Kłobukowska	Poland
silver medal	Irena Kirszenstein	Poland
bronze medal	Karin Frisch	West Germany

The women's 100 metres at the 1966 European Athletics Championships was held in Budapest, Hungary, at Népstadion on 30 and 31 August 1966.

== Participation ==
According to an unofficial count, 23 athletes from 10 countries participated in the event.

- Albania (1)
- Czechoslovakia (1)
- East Germany (2)
- France (3)
- Hungary (2)
- Netherlands (3)
- Poland (3)
- Soviet Union (3)
- Great Britain (2)
- West Germany (3)

== Results ==
=== Heats ===
30 August

==== Heat 1 ====
Rank	Name	Nationality	Time	Notes
1	Irena Kirszenstein	Poland	11.6	Q
2	Wilma van den Berg	Netherlands	11.8	Q
3	Jutta Stöck	West Germany	11.9	Q
4	Ingrid Tiedtke	East Germany	11.9	Q
5	Valentyna Bolshova	Soviet Union	12.0	
6	Gabrielle Meyer	France	12.2	
			Wind: 0.0 m/s	

==== Heat 2 ====
Rank	Name	Nationality	Time	Notes
1	Ewa Kłobukowska	Poland	11.4	CR, Q
2	Eva Lehocká	Czechoslovakia	11.6	Q
3	Nicole Montandon	France	11.8	Q
4	Daphne Slater	Great Britain	11.9	Q
5	Ursula Böhm	East Germany	11.9	
6	Erzsébet Bartos	Hungary	11.9	
			Wind: 0.0 m/s	

==== Heat 3 ====
Rank	Name	Nationality	Time	Notes
1	Karin Frisch	West Germany	11.7	Q
2	Margit Nemesházi	Hungary	11.8	Q
3	Lidy Vonk	Netherlands	11.9	Q
4	Sylviane Telliez	France	11.9	Q
5	Renāte Lāce	Soviet Union	12.0	
6	Myzejen Duli	Albania	12.7	
			Wind: +0.4 m/s	

==== Heat 4 ====
Rank	Name	Nationality	Time	Notes
1	Hannelore Trabert	West Germany	11.7	Q
2	Vera Popkova	Soviet Union	11.8	Q
3	Jill Hall	Great Britain	11.9	Q
4	Corrie Bakker	Netherlands	12.0	Q
5	Elżbieta Kolejwa	Poland	12.1	
			Wind: 0.0 m/s	

=== Semi-finals ===
31 August

==== Semi-final 1 ====
Rank	Name	Nationality	Time	Notes
1	Ewa Kłobukowska	Poland	11.4	CR, Q
2	Karin Frisch	West Germany	11.7	Q
3	Eva Lehocká	Czechoslovakia	11.8	Q
4	Jutta Stöck	West Germany	11.8	Q
5	Nicole Montandon	France	11.9	
6	Wilma van den Berg	Netherlands	11.9	
7	Corrie Bakker	Netherlands	12.0	
8	Daphne Slater	Great Britain	12.0	
			Wind: 0.0 m/s	

==== Semi-final 2 ====
Rank	Name	Nationality	Time	Notes
1	Irena Kirszenstein	Poland	11.5	Q
2	Margit Nemesházi	Hungary	11.8	Q
3	Hannelore Trabert	West Germany	11.8	Q
4	Vera Popkova	Soviet Union	11.8	Q
5	Jill Hall	Great Britain	11.9	
6	Sylviane Telliez	France	11.9	
7	Lidy Vonk	Netherlands	11.9	
8	Ingrid Tiedtke	East Germany	11.9	
			Wind: +0.7 m/s	

=== Final ===
31 August

Rank	Name	Nationality	Time	Notes
1st place, gold medalist(s)	Ewa Kłobukowska	Poland	11.5	
2nd place, silver medalist(s)	Irena Kirszenstein	Poland	11.5	
3rd place, bronze medalist(s)	Karin Frisch	West Germany	11.8	
4	Eva Lehocká	Czechoslovakia	11.9	
5	Vera Popkova	Soviet Union	11.9	
6	Margit Nemesházi	Hungary	11.9	
7	Jutta Stöck	West Germany	11.9	
8	Hannelore Trabert	West Germany	12.0	
			Wind: -1.1 m/s	
