= Athletics at the 1967 Summer Universiade – Women's 200 metres =

The women's 200 metres event at the 1967 Summer Universiade was held at the National Olympic Stadium in Tokyo on 2 and 3 September 1967.

== Medalists ==
Gold	Silver	Bronze
Gabrielle Meyer; France	Barbara Ferrell; United States	Jannette Champion; Great Britain

== Results ==
=== Heats ===
Rank	Heat	Athlete	Nationality	Time	Notes
1	1	Barbara Ferrell	United States	24.0	Q
2	1	Jannette Champion	Great Britain	24.8	Q
3	1	Michèle Alayrangues	France	25.0	Q
4	1	Helga Kapfer	Austria	25.1	Q
5	1	Miho Sato	Japan	25.1	
6	1	Marlies Fünfstück	West Germany	25.5	
7	1	Anna Hsu	Hong Kong	26.3	
1	2	Gabrielle Meyer	France	24.2	Q
2	2	Miyoke Tsujishita	Japan	25.0	Q
3	2	Biruta Vilmanis	Australia	25.2	Q
4	2	Angela Birch	Great Britain	25.3	Q
5	2	Glória Ferraz	Brazil	25.9	
6	2	Hwang Jung-ja	South Korea	26.3	

=== Final ===
Wind: +0.5 m/s

Rank	Name	Nationality	Time	Notes
1st place, gold medalist(s)	Gabrielle Meyer	France	23.8	
2nd place, silver medalist(s)	Barbara Ferrell	United States	23.9	
3rd place, bronze medalist(s)	Jannette Champion	Great Britain	24.7	
4	Michèle Alayrangues	France	24.9	
5	Miyoke Tsujishita	Japan	25.0	
6	Helga Kapfer	Austria	25.0	
7	Angela Birch	Great Britain	25.7	
8	Biruta Vilmanis	Australia	25.7	
