= Athletics at the 1966 British Empire and Commonwealth Games – Women's javelin throw =

Women's javelin throw at the 1966 British Empire and Commonwealth Games
- Venue: Independence Park, Kingston
- Dates: August 11, 1966

Medalists
gold medal	Margaret Parker	Australia
silver medal	Anna Bocson	Australia
bronze medal	Jay Dahlgren	Canada

The women's javelin throw event at the 1966 British Empire and Commonwealth Games was held on 11 August at the Independence Park in Kingston, Jamaica.

== Results ==
Final results
Rank	Name	Nationality	Distance	Notes
1st place, gold medalist(s)	Margaret Parker	Australia	168 ft 7 in (51.39 m)	
2nd place, silver medalist(s)	Anna Bocson	Australia	156 ft 10 in (47.81 m)	
3rd place, bronze medalist(s)	Jay Dahlgren	Canada	156 ft 5 in (47.68 m)	
4	Jean Blake	Jamaica	149 ft 7 in (45.60 m)	
5	Christa Leipert	Canada	145 ft 10 in (44.46 m)	
6	Sue Platt	England	138 ft 8 in (42.27 m)	
7	Eileen Sutherland	Jamaica	134 ft 11 in (41.13 m)	
