= Alma Martínez =

Alma Martínez may refer to:

- Alma Martínez (footballer) (born 1981), Mexican footballer
- Alma Martinez (actress) (born 1953), American actress
- Alma Rosa Martínez (born 1951), Mexican Olympic sprinter
