= Barbara Lyall =

Scottish athlete

Personal information
- Nationality: British (Scottish)
- Born: 7 May 1944 (age 81)

Sport
- Sport: Athletics
- Event(s): Sprints, 440y
- Club: Tayside AAC; Edinburgh Southern Harriers

Barbara Jean Dadswell Lyall married name Oliver (born 7 May 1944) is a former track and field athlete from Scotland who competed at two Commonwealth Games.

== Biography ==
Lyall was a member of the Tayside Amateur Athletic Club and set a club record of 2min 35sec, over 880 yards in May 1964.

She won the Scottish AAA Championship title over 440 yards in 1965.

Lyall represented the Scottish Empire and Commonwealth Games team at the 1966 British Empire and Commonwealth Games in Kingston, Jamaica, participating in two events, the 220 yards and the 440 yards.

In 1967 she opened a fashion shop at 22 Brook Street in Broughty Ferry. Lyall joined the Edinburgh Southern Harriers in 1968.

Lyall represented Great Britain when they defeated the United States at the White City Stadium in 1969, in the 4x400m relay and reached the final of the 400 metres at the 1970 British Commonwealth Games.
