= Edward Laboran =

Papua New Guinean high jumper

Personal information
- Full name: Edward Laboran
- Nationality: Papua New Guinean
- Born: 23 June 1942 (age 84)

Sport
- Country: Papua New Guinea
- Sport: Athletics
- Event: High jump
Medal record
Men's athletics
Representing Papua New Guinea
South Pacific Games
Gold medal – first place	1963 Suva	High jump

Edward Laboran (born 23 June 1942) is a former Papua New Guinean high jumper.

Laboran won the high jump event at the inaugural Papua New Guinea National Championships, held in Lae on 6 October 1962, with a leap of 1.90 m. He went on to win this event for the next three years.

The following year, Laboran was part of the maiden Papua New Guinean team to compete at the 1962 British Empire and Commonwealth Games in Perth, Western Australia, where he finished 11th in the high jump clearing the bar at 6 ft 4 in (1.93 m). This set a new national record which stood for five years.

Twelve months later at the inaugural South Pacific Games in Suva, Fiji, Edward easily won gold in the high jump. With a jump of 6 ft 3 in (1.91 m), he finished a full ten centimeters higher than the silver medal winner, Tevita Kabakoro from Fiji. This established an inaugural games record that stood until the 1971 Games in Tahiti.

In the 2011 Pacific Games in Nouméa, Laboran was honoured by participating in a medal ceremony for the Athletics competition.

In December 2011, Laboran alongside Sir John Kaputin, became the inaugural inductees into the Papua New Guinea Olympic Committee Sporting Hall of Fame.
