= Georgena Craig =

Scottish athlete

Georgena Craig née Buchanan
Personal information
- Nationality: British (Scottish)
- Born: 17 July 1942

Sport
- Sport: Athletics
- Event: Middle-distance
- Club: Western AC

Georgena Craig née Buchanan (born 17 July 1942) is a former track and field athlete from Scotland who competed at two Commonwealth Games.

== Biography ==
Buchanan was a member of the Western Athletic Club and won three consecutive Scottish AAA Championship titles over 880 yards in 1963, 1964 and 1965, in addition to the 1 mile title in 1964.

A bookkeeper by profession, she married in late 1965 and competed under her married name of Craig thereafter.

Craig represented the Scottish Empire and Commonwealth Games team at the 1966 British Empire and Commonwealth Games in Kingston, Jamaica, participating in one event, the 880 yards race.

Craig reached the final of the 800 metres at the 1970 British Commonwealth Games in Edinburgh.
