= 1970 European Athletics Indoor Championships – Women's 60 metres =

The women's 60 metres event at the 1970 European Athletics Indoor Championships was held on 15 March in Vienna.

== Medalists ==
| Gold | Silver | Bronze |
|---|---|---|
| Renate Meißner; East Germany | Sylviane Telliez; France | Wilma van den Berg; Netherlands |

== Results ==
=== Heats ===
First 4 from each heat (Q) qualified directly for the semifinals.

| Rank | Heat | Name | Nationality | Time | Notes |
|---|---|---|---|---|---|
| 1 | 1 | Renate Meißner | East Germany | 7.3 | Q |
| 2 | 1 | Sylviane Telliez | France | 7.5 | Q |
| 3 | 1 | Eleonora Monoranu | Romania | 7.6 | Q |
| 4 | 1 | Brigitte Ortner | Austria | 7.7 | Q |
| 5 | 1 | Elisabeth Waldburger | Switzerland | 7.7 | |
| 1 | 2 | Wilma van den Berg | Netherlands | 7.5 | Q |
| 2 | 2 | Mirosława Sarna | Poland | 7.7 | Q |
| 3 | 2 | Vera Popkova | Soviet Union | 7.7 | Q |
| 4 | 2 | Alena Vozáková | Czechoslovakia | 7.8 | Q |
| 5 | 2 | Gabrielle Meyer | France | 7.8 | |
| 1 | 3 | Annegret Irrgang | West Germany | 7.6 | Q |
| 2 | 3 | Nadezhda Besfamilnaya | Soviet Union | 7.6 | Q |
| 3 | 3 | Else Hadrup | Denmark | 7.7 | Q |
| 4 | 3 | Cecilia Molinari | Italy | 7.7 | Q |

=== Semifinals ===
First 3 from each heat (Q) qualified directly for the final.

| Rank | Heat | Name | Nationality | Time | Notes |
|---|---|---|---|---|---|
| 1 | 1 | Renate Meißner | East Germany | 7.4 | Q |
| 2 | 1 | Wilma van den Berg | Netherlands | 7.5 | Q |
| 3 | 1 | Annegret Irrgang | West Germany | 7.5 | Q |
| 4 | 1 | Eleonora Monoranu | Romania | 7.6 | |
| 5 | 1 | Else Hadrup | Denmark | 7.6 | |
| 6 | 1 | Vera Popkova | Soviet Union | 7.7 | |
| 1 | 2 | Sylviane Telliez | France | 7.5 | Q |
| 2 | 2 | Mirosława Sarna | Poland | 7.5 | Q |
| 3 | 2 | Nadezhda Besfamilnaya | Soviet Union | 7.6 | Q |
| 4 | 2 | Brigitte Ortner | Austria | 7.7 | |
| 5 | 2 | Cecilia Molinari | Italy | 7.7 | |
| 6 | 2 | Alena Vozáková | Czechoslovakia | 7.7 | |

=== Final ===
| Rank | Lane | Name | Nationality | Time | Notes |
|---|---|---|---|---|---|
| 1st place, gold medalist(s) | 6 | Renate Meißner | East Germany | 7.4 | |
| 2nd place, silver medalist(s) | 1 | Sylviane Telliez | France | 7.5 | |
| 3rd place, bronze medalist(s) | 2 | Wilma van den Berg | Netherlands | 7.5 | |
| 4 | 5 | Nadezhda Besfamilnaya | Soviet Union | 7.6 | |
| 5 | 4 | Mirosława Sarna | Poland | 7.6 | |
| 6 | 3 | Annegret Irrgang | West Germany | 7.6 | |
