= Athletics at the 1966 British Empire and Commonwealth Games – Women's discus throw =

Women's discus throw at the 1966 British Empire and Commonwealth Games
- Venue: Independence Park, Kingston
- Dates: August 13, 1966

Medalists
gold medal	Valerie Sloper-Young	New Zealand
silver medal	Jean Roberts	Australia
bronze medal	Carol Martin	Canada

The women's discus throw event at the 1966 British Empire and Commonwealth Games was held on 13 August at the Independence Park in Kingston, Jamaica.

== Results ==
Final results
Rank	Name	Nationality	Distance	Notes
1st place, gold medalist(s)	Valerie Sloper-Young	New Zealand	163 ft 4 in (49.78 m)	
2nd place, silver medalist(s)	Jean Roberts	Australia	161 ft 5 in (49.20 m)	
3rd place, bronze medalist(s)	Carol Martin	Canada	159 ft 9 in (48.69 m)	
4	Christine Payne	Scotland	156 ft 5 in (47.68 m)	
5	Nancy McCredie	Canada	150 ft 11 in (46.01 m)	
6	Brenda Bedford	England	147 ft 1 in (44.84 m)	
7	Judith Dahlgren	Canada	136 ft 8 in (41.66 m)	
8	Diane Charteris	New Zealand	126 ft 2 in (38.46 m)	
9	Joan Gordon	Jamaica	120 ft 2 in (36.63 m)	
