= Athletics at the 1970 British Commonwealth Games – Women's long jump =

Women's long jump at the 1970 British Commonwealth Games
- Venue: Meadowbank Stadium, Edinburgh
- Dates: 25 July 1970

Medalists
gold medal	Sheila Sherwood	England
silver medal	Ann Wilson	England
bronze medal	Joan Hendry	Canada

The women's long jump event at the 1970 British Commonwealth Games was held on 25 July at the Meadowbank Stadium in Edinburgh, Scotland.

== Results ==
Final result
Rank	Name	Nationality	Distance	Notes
1st place, gold medalist(s)	Sheila Sherwood	England	6.73	GR
2nd place, silver medalist(s)	Ann Wilson	England	6.50	
3rd place, bronze medalist(s)	Joan Hendry	Canada	6.28	
4	Louise Stevenson	Scotland	6.23	
5	Moira Walls	Scotland	6.20	
6	Brenda Eisler	Canada	6.11	
7	Barbara-Anne Barrett	England	6.11	
8	Jean Jamieson	Scotland	6.02	
9	Ruth Martin-Jones	Wales	6.00	
10	Pamela Hendren	New Zealand	5.72	
11	Alice Annum	Ghana	5.55	
12	Emille Edet	Nigeria	5.11	
13	Henrietta Carew	Sierra Leone	4.41	
	Zetha Cofie	Ghana	NM	
	Princess Small	Gambia	DNS	
	Yvonne Saunders	Jamaica	DNS	
