= Janet Omorogbe =

Nigerian sprinter

Personal information
- Nationality: Nigerian
- Born: 22 November 1942 (age 82)

Sport
- Sport: Sprinting
- Event: 4 × 100 metres relay

Janet Omorogbe (born 22 November 1942) is a Nigerian sprinter. She competed in the women's 4 × 100 metres relay at the 1968 Summer Olympics.
