= Mildrette Netter =

American athlete (born 1948)

Personal information
- Born: June 16, 1948 (age 78) Rosedale, Mississippi, U.S.
Medal record
Women's athletics
Representing the United States
Olympic Games
Gold medal – first place	1968 Mexico City	4 × 100 metre relay

Mildrette Netter (born June 16, 1948, in Rosedale, Mississippi) is an American athlete who competed mainly in the 100 meters. She competed for the United States in the 1968 Summer Olympics held in Mexico City, Mexico in the 4 × 100 meters where she won the gold medal with her teammates Barbara Ferrell, Margaret Bailes, and Wyomia Tyus. The relay Netter was a part of set the world record with a time of 42.88. Netter also competed in the 1972 Olympics.

She grew up in Rosedale, Mississippi. She was short. She became the first female Olympic medalist from Mississippi. There were no women's track programs in Mississippi when she graduated from high school and she was denied a scholarship to Tennessee State.

After her gold medal win, Alcorn State established a women's track tram, the first in Mississippi. She married fellow Alcorn alumnus Willie White, Vietnam War veteran.

She is a member of the Rosedale-West Bolivar High School Hall of Fame. The track and field at Alcorn was renamed for her. She is in the Alcorn State Hall of Honor, SWAC Hall of Fame, Alcorn State Athletic Hall of Fame, the Clarksdale/Coahoma Sports Hall of Fame, Bob Hayes Track Hall of Fame, and Mississippi Sports Hall of Fame.
