= Lorna McGarvey =

Northern Irish athlete

Personal information
- Nationality: British (Northern Irish)
- Born: c.1944

Sport
- Sport: Athletics, Field hockey
- Event: Sprints
- Club: Ballymena AC

Lorna McGarvey (born c.1944) is a former athlete from Northern Ireland, who represented Northern Ireland at the British Empire and Commonwealth Games (now Commonwealth Games).

== Biography ==
McGarvey attended Coleraine High School and studied at the Ulster College of Physical Education. She was a member of the Ballymena Ladies Athletic Club.

McGarvey also excelled at hockey and represented Ireland at national level in 1964.

McGarvey represented the 1966 Northern Irish Team at the 1966 British Empire and Commonwealth Games in Kingston, Jamaica, participating in the two athletics events; the 100 yards race and the 220 yards race.

McGarvey was a nine-times Northern Irish champion, winning the 100 yards title in 1965, 1966, 1971 and 1972 and the 220 yards title in 1965, 1966 and 1971 and one long jump and heptathlon title.
