= We Are the Champions (British TV series) =

British TV children's game show (1973–1995)

- Genre: Children's game show
- Created by: Alan Russell; Ron Pickering
- Presented by: Ron Pickering (1973–90); Gary Lineker (1991–92); Linford Christie (1993–94); Judy Simpson (1995); Paddy McGuinness (2010)
- Country of origin: United Kingdom
- Original language: English
- No. of series: 16
- No. of episodes: 104 (inc. 13 specials)

Production
- Running time: 30 minutes

Original release
- Network: BBC1
- Release: 13 June 1973 – 25 July 1995
- Network: CBBC
- Release: 8 March – 12 March 2010

We Are the Champions is a children's game show that ran from 13 June 1973 to 25 July 1995. It was originally presented by Ron Pickering but, when he died in 1991, Gary Lineker, Linford Christie and Judy Simpson took over as presenters of the remaining one-off specials.

The programme was formatted around a traditional British school sports day, where children would compete in various athletics and swimming competitions. Each programme concluded with Pickering shouting to the children "Away you go!", and they would all run and jump into the swimming pool as the titles ran.

In March 2010, We Are the Champions was revived as part of the BBC's Sport Relief programming. It was hosted by Paddy McGuinness with team captains Tim Henman, Amir Khan, Dame Kelly Holmes and Mark Foster.

== Transmissions ==
=== BBC1 ===
==== Series ====
Series	Start date	End date	Episodes
1	13 June 1973	25 July 1973	7
2	4 June 1974	2 July 1974	5
3	4 July 1975	1 August 1975	5
4	10 August 1976	21 September 1976	7
5	7 July 1977	4 August 1977	5
6	27 June 1978	8 August 1978	7
7	1 June 1979	13 July 1979	7
8	26 June 1980	7 August 1980	7
9	2 July 1981	13 August 1981	7
10	28 July 1982	8 September 1982	7
11	30 June 1983	11 August 1983	7
12	21 June 1984	2 August 1984	7
13	27 June 1985	8 August 1985	7
14	3 June 1986	15 July 1986	7
15	2 July 1987	13 August 1987	7

==== Specials ====
Date	Entitle
18 August 1983	Disabled Special
15 August 1984	Disabled Special
15 August 1985	Disabled Special
22 July 1986	Disabled Special
20 August 1987	Disabled Special
18 August 1988	Disabled Special
7 September 1989	Disabled Special
9 August 1990	Disabled Special
5 September 1991	Disabled Special
10 September 1992	Disabled Special
9 September 1993	Disabled Special
6 September 1994	Disabled Special
25 July 1995	Disabled Special

=== CBBC ===
Series	Start date	End date	Episodes
1	8 March 2010	12 March 2010	5
