= Alix Jamieson =

British long jumper

Alix Stevenson née Jamieson
Personal information
- Nationality: British (Scottish)
- Born: 31 March 1942 (age 84) Cathcart, Glasgow, Scotland
- Height: 161 cm (5 ft 3 in)
- Weight: 58 kg (128 lb)

Sport
- Sport: Athletics
- Events: Long jump 100-yard dash
- Club: Western Athletic Club; Maryhill Harriers

Louise Alexander "Alix" Stevenson (née Jamieson; born 31 March 1942) is a Scottish retired athlete. She competed for Great Britain in the women's long jump at the 1964 Summer Olympics in Tokyo, Japan.

== Career ==
Trained by the respected coach John Anderson, Jamieson was a national champion in multiple events (as well as a Scotland international in field hockey) and still holds the record for most golds won overall at the Scottish Athletics Championships with 16 claimed over a decade between 1960 and 1970 (two in the 100-yard dash, three in the 80 metres hurdles, seven in the long jump and four in the pentathlon). At British level, she claimed a long jump gold medal in 1964 at the AAA Indoor Championships and a pentathlon bronze behnd Mary Peters at the 1966 WAAA Championships.

On a wider platform, she entered three events at the 1958 Commonwealth Games (100 yards, 220 yards and high jump, though without great success), again made little impact on the 100 yards event at the 1966 Games however achieved fourth place in the long jump event, then focused solely on the long jump at her 'home' games at Edinburgh in 1970, but finished in fourth just outside the medals once more. At the 1964 Olympics, she qualified for the final group with the exact distance required – 6.00m – but was unable to match or better this score in the final; British teammate Mary Rand won the gold medal and recorded a world record jump (6.76m) in the competition.

== Personal life ==
Jamieson attended Hutcheson's Grammar School in Glasgow, and during her time there was awarded the nationwide 'Frances Barker Shield' for outstanding performance on three occasions. In 2009, the school's new multi-sport facility was named the Alix Jamieson Stadium in recognition of her achievements.

She is one of several talented sportspeople in her family: her father Andrew was a golfer who won the Scottish Amateur championship, represented Scotland and Great Britain (Walker Cup) in team play and briefly achieved fame when he unexpectedly beat Bobby Jones, one of the leading talents of the era; her younger sister Jinty was also an athlete who competed alongside her in the 1970 Commonwealth Games; her second cousin Jean Westwood was a multiple World champion in ice dancing; and her husband David Stevenson was a fellow competitor in the 1964 Olympics in the pole vault event. As the operators of a successful textile business (Edinburgh Woollen Mill), the Stevensons jointly owned several National Hunt racehorses, with Gordon W. Richards as a trainer; their Irish son-in-law Ger Lyons is also a successful racehorse trainer, with his own daughter Kerri among his staff.
