= Athletics at the 1966 British Empire and Commonwealth Games – Women's high jump =

Women's high jump at the 1966 British Empire and Commonwealth Games
- Venue: Independence Park, Kingston
- Dates: August 8, 1966

Medalists
gold medal	Michele Brown	Australia
silver medal	Dorothy Shirley	England
bronze medal	Robyn Woodhouse	Australia

The women's high jump event at the 1966 British Empire and Commonwealth Games was held on 8 August at the Independence Park in Kingston, Jamaica.

== Results ==
Final results
Rank	Name	Nationality	Height	Notes
1st place, gold medalist(s)	Michele Brown	Australia	5 ft 8 in (1.73 m)	
2nd place, silver medalist(s)	Dorothy Shirley	England	5 ft 7 in (1.70 m)	
3rd place, bronze medalist(s)	Robyn Woodhouse	Australia	5 ft 7 in (1.70 m)	
4	Susan Nigh	Canada	5 ft 6 in (1.67 m)	
5	Althea Callender	Barbados	5 ft 6 in (1.67 m)	
6	Gwenda Hurst	England	5 ft 5 in (1.65 m)	
7	Ann Wilson	England	5 ft 5 in (1.65 m)	
8	Mary Rand	England	5 ft 4 in (1.62 m)	
9	Valerie Surgeon	Jamaica	5 ft 3 in (1.60 m)	
10	Lesline Cameron	Jamaica	5 ft 2 in (1.57 m)	
11	Emelda Lewis	Antigua and Barbuda	4 ft 10 in (1.47 m)	
	Yvonne Sawyer	Sierra Leone	NM	
	B. Roach	Bahamas	DNS	
