= Marilyn Neufville =

Jamaican sprinter

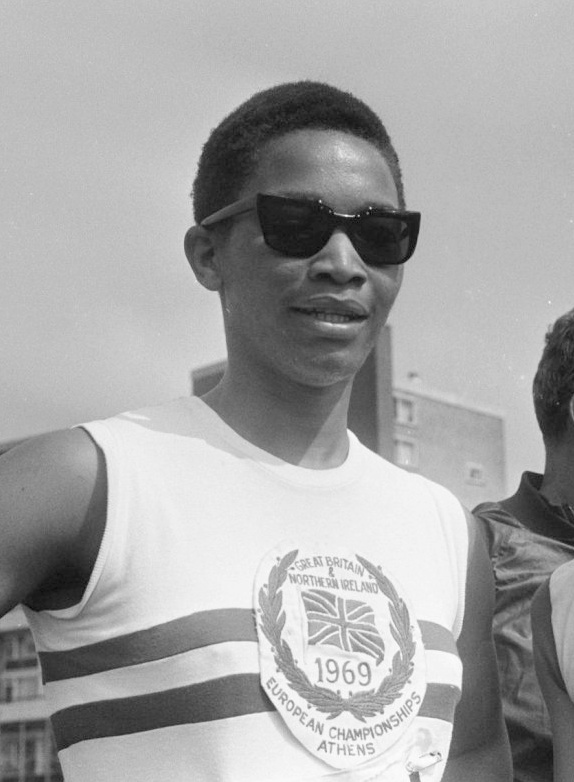
- Marilyn Neufville in 1970

Personal information
- Born: 16 November 1952 (age 73) Hectors River, Portland, Jamaica
- Height: 1.65 m (5 ft 5 in)
- Weight: 55 kg (121 lb)

Sport
- Sport: Sprint
- Club: California Golden Bears, Berkeley
Medal record
Representing Jamaica
Commonwealth Games
Gold medal – first place	1970 Edinburgh	400 m
Pan American Games
Gold medal – first place	1971 Cali	400 m
Bronze medal – third place	1971 Cali	4 × 400 m relay
Central American and Caribbean Championships
Gold medal – first place	1971 Kingston	400 m
Representing Great Britain
European Athletics Indoor Championships
Gold medal – first place	1970 Vienna	400 m

Marilyn Fay Neufville (born 16 November 1952) is a retired sprint runner who was active between 1967 and 1971. Neufville broke the world record in the 400 m and won four gold medals and one bronze in various regional championships. Born in Jamaica, she emigrated at eight years old to Great Britain.

== British years ==
Neufville gained three Women's AAA titles as a junior in the 100 yds and 150 yds in the under 15s category in 1967 and won the 220 yds in the under 17 category in 1968. In 1969, Neufville was second behind Dorothy Hyman in the 200 metres event at the 1969 WAAA Championships, finishing in a time of 24.3 seconds.

Neufville first appeared on the international scene in September 1969, when she ran the 4 × 400 m in a Great Britain vs West Germany match in Hamburg. In March 1970, she competed for Great Britain in the European Indoor Athletics Championships and won gold over 400 m in 53.01 s, breaking her outdoor PB of 54.2 s and the world indoor record, as well as the UK National Junior Indoor Record which stood until February 2019 when Amber Anning ran 53.00 s dead.

Later in 1970, Neufville became the national 400 metres champion after winning the British WAAA Championships title at the 1970 WAAA Championships in 52.6 s.

== Jamaican years ==
In the summer, before the 1970 British Commonwealth Games in Edinburgh, Neufville chose to represent her country of birth, Jamaica over her country of residence. This caused wide controversy with many members of the British public saying she had betrayed where she was trained and considered her switch like treason. At the Commonwealth Games, Neufville established a new world record by improving the preceding mark previously held by the Frenchwomen Colette Besson and Nicole Duclos with 51.0 s (electronically timed as 51.02 s) at the age of 17. This made her the first and so far only Jamaican female athlete to break an outdoor world record.

In 1970, she gained more recognition at ISTAF athletics meet in Berlin then at the AAA championships running 52.6 s in front of Germany's Christel Frese and Inge Eckhoff.

In 1971, in the indoor AAA championships, Neufville was beaten by Jannette Champion which reversed the result of the previous year. The same year, in the Pan-American Championships in Cali, she gained her third gold medal and bronze in the 4 × 400 m relay. At the 1971 Central American and Caribbean Championships she won a fourth gold medal. Her successes earned her two Jamaica Sportswoman of the year awards in 1970 and 1971.

In 1972, she enrolled at the University of California, Berkeley. She is still ranked number 3 on the school's all-time list.

After battling with injuries, Neufville returned at the 1974 British Commonwealth Games but was a shadow of her former self—only finishing sixth in the 400 m final.

Neufville made her Olympic debut at the 1976 Summer Olympics. She finished fourth in her heat but withdrew from the round 2 heat due to injury.

== Trivia ==
- Despite being World Record Holder and Commonwealth champion when she was 17 she did not make her Olympic debut until she was 24.
- She was a member of Cambridge Harriers and as of May 2021, still holds that club's U20 400 m record of 51 s set at the Commonwealth Games in Edinburgh on 23 Jul 1970.

== Honours ==
=== European Athletics Indoor Championships ===
1970 European Athletics Indoor Championships in Vienna, Austria

- Gold medal 400 m

=== British Commonwealth Games ===
1970 British Commonwealth Games in Edinburgh, Scotland

- Gold medal 400 m
- 5th place 4 × 100 m

1974 British Commonwealth Games in Christchurch, New Zealand

- 6th in the 400 m

=== Pan-American Games ===
1971 Pan American Games in Cali, Colombia

- Gold medal 400 m
- Bronze medal 4 × 400 m relay

=== Central American and Caribbean Championships ===
1971 Central American and Caribbean Championships in Athletics in Kingston, Jamaica

- Gold Medal 400 m

=== World records ===
- The 400 m world record of 51.02 s on 23 July 1970 in Edinburgh (an improvement of the world record set by Colette Besson and Nicole Duclos) was equalled by Monika Zehrt and Mona-Lisa Pursiainen then beaten by Irena Szewińska in 1974.
- 400 m world indoor record in 53.01 s in March 1971 in Vienna broken by Nadezhda Ilyina in 1974.

== See also ==
- Athletics at the 1970 British Commonwealth Games – Women's 400 metres
