= Shaun Pickering =

British shot putter (1961–2023)

Personal information
- Nationality: British (Welsh)
- Born: 14 November 1961 Griffithstown, Monmouthshire, Wales
- Died: 11 May 2023 (aged 61)
- Height: 197 cm (6 ft 6 in)
- Weight: 143 kg (315 lb)

Sport
- Sport: Athletics
- Event: Shot put
- Club: Haringey AC
Medal record
Representing Wales
Men's shot put
Commonwealth Games
Bronze medal – third place	1998 Kuala Lumpur	Shot put

Shaun Pickering (14 November 1961 – 11 May 2023) was a British shot putter who represented Great Britain at the 1996 Summer Olympics and Wales in the Commonwealth Games.

== Biography ==
Competing for the Stanford Cardinal track and field team, Pickering finished 6th in the weight throw for distance at the 1984 NCAA Indoor Track and Field Championships and 1985 NCAA Division I Indoor Track and Field Championships.

Pickering represented Wales at the 1998 Commonwealth Games in Kuala Lumpur and won a bronze medal. At the 1996 Olympic Games in Atlanta, he represented Great Britain in the shot put event. He became the British shot put champion after winning the 1997 British Athletics Championships title.

Pickering was a member of the Welsh Athletics hall of fame for a career that included winning five Welsh shot put titles, five Welsh discus throw titles, and nine Welsh hammer throw titles. Pickering was the son of Olympian Jean Pickering and Ron Pickering and in 2010 became the heavy throws coach for UK Athletics.

Pickering died on 11 May 2023, at the age of 61.
