= Stratford School =

Location
- Upton Lane; Forest Gate, Greater London, E7 9PR; England; 51.5411°N 0.0235°E

Information
- Type: Academy
- Department for Education URN: 136978 Tables
- Ofsted: Reports
- Headteacher: Craig Hewitt
- Gender: Coeducational
- Age: 11 to 16
- Enrolment: 1372
- Website: http://www.stratford.newham.sch.uk

Stratford School is a secondary academy school in Forest Gate in the London Borough of Newham, England. It has no sixth form.

== Location ==
It is situated on Upton Lane (A114). Nearby to the west is the Newham College of Further Education, and further west is the site of the 2012 Summer Olympics. Opposite the school is West Ham Park.

== History ==
Stratford Grammar School, Grosvenor Road, originated in 1906, when West Ham Municipal Central Secondary (mixed) School was opened in Whalebone Lane and Tennyson Road, in buildings for 680, planned by the school board as a higher elementary school. The initial intake of 369 included the pupil-teachers from two centres opened by the school board in 1894 and given permanent buildings in Russell Road (1896) and Water Lane (1897). The last preparatory pupil-teachers were selected in 1909, and from 1912 bursaries were granted to intending teachers who followed a full secondary course. This bursary scheme ended in 1936. The school was enlarged in 1914, c.1920, and again in 1931. Between the two world wars, when attendance was about 600, its reputation as a central school was very high. The term 'Central' was dropped from its name in 1925. The school was partly destroyed by bombing in 1941, after which some temporary huts were added. It became Stratford Grammar School in 1945, and in 1958 it was transferred to new buildings on the site of the former Upton Lane school.

In 1960 the Head Teacher was Mr Arnold G Burness and there was a four form entry of about 120 pupils per year. There was also a lower and upper sixth form.

It became a sixth-form-entry comprehensive in 1972.

The school officially gained academy status on 1 August 2011. It gets GCSE results well above average.

== Tradition ==
When the school moved to the newly developed Upton Lane site in 1958 a statue of an owl was mounted near the main entrance. The owl was said to represent wisdom, but as the owl also featured on the school uniform logo pupils were known locally as members of the Ollie Beak fan club. This was a reference to the owl puppet on the popular children's TV programme Tuesday Rendezvous with this name. At this time pupils were assigned to one of four houses: Fry (green), Gurney (blue), Langthorne (yellow) and Lister (red) named after Elizabeth Fry, Samuel Gurney, Stratford Langthorne Abbey, and Joseph Lister.

Before 2005 the school uniform consisted of purple blazers, however it changed in September 2005 to black. Each year group has colour-coded badges. Each pupil is also in one of six houses, Curie, Noether, Euler, Crick, Hawking, Berners-Lee; each denoted by a different colour stripe on their tie.

== Notable former pupils ==
West Ham Secondary School

- Bryan Forbes, film star and director
- Ron Pickering, Olympic team coach and TV sports presenter - formerly also sports master at the school in the 1950s

Stratford Grammar School

- Sir Michael Lyons, Chairman since 2007 of the BBC Trust and Chief Executive from 1994-2001 of Birmingham City Council
- Alan Baker, mathematician involved with number theory and Professor of Pure Mathematics from 1974-2006 at the University of Cambridge
- Jean Pickering, Olympic athlete.
- Terry Smith, Chief of Collins Stewart since 2000 (became Tullett Prebon in 2006)
