= Mairo Jinadu =

Nigerian sprinter

Personal information
- Nationality: Nigerian
- Born: 28 December 1948 (age 76)

Sport
- Sport: Sprinting
- Event: 4 × 100 metres relay

Mairo Jinadu (born 28 December 1948) is a Nigerian sprinter. She competed in the women's 4 × 100 metres relay at the 1968 Summer Olympics.
