= Karin Reichert-Frisch =

German sprinter

Personal information
- Nationality: German
- Born: 17 January 1941 (age 85)

Sport
- Sport: Sprinting
- Event: 100 metres
Medal record
Women's athletics
Representing West Germany
European Championships
Silver medal – second place	1966 Budapest	80 m hurdles
Silver medal – second place	1966 Budapest	4×100 m
Bronze medal – third place	1966 Budapest	100 m

Karin Reichert-Frisch (German pronunciation: [ˈkaːʁiːn ˈʁaɪçɐt ˈfʁɪʃ, -ʁɪn -]) (née Frisch; born 17 January 1941) is a German sprinter. She competed in the women's 100 metres at the 1968 Summer Olympics.
