= Thelwyn Appleby =

Welsh athlete

Thelwyn Appleby Married name Bateman
Personal information
- Nationality: British (Welsh)
- Born: 18 December 1944 Rugby, England

Sport
- Sport: Athletics
- Event(s): Sprints, 400m, middle-distance, Cross Country
- Club: Coventry Godiva Harriers

Thelwyn S. Appleby married name Bateman (born 18 December 1944) is a former track and field athlete from Wales, who competed at the 1966 British Empire and Commonwealth Games and the 1970 British Commonwealth Games (now Commonwealth Games).

== Biography ==
Appleby was a member of the Coventry Godiva Harriers and was eligible for Wales through her Welsh parentage. After winning the Midland Championships in May 1966, Appleby was short listed for the Commonwealth Games.

She subsequently represented the 1966 Welsh team at the 1966 British Empire and Commonwealth Games in Kingston, Jamaica, participating in four events; the 100 yards, the 220 yards, the 440 yards and the 4 × 110 yards relay, with Gloria Dourass, Liz Gill and Liz Parsons.

Shortly after the Games, Appleby married her coach Roy Bateman and participated under her married name thereafter.

As Thelwyn Bateman she competed for Wales at multiple major cross county championships won the 3000 metres title on two occasions at the AAA Indoor Championships and became the British 3,000 metres champion at the 1976 WAAA Championships by virtue of being the highest placed British athlete.

She went to a second Commonwealth Games, representing the 1970 Welsh team at the 1970 British Commonwealth Games in Edinburgh, Scotland.
