= Margaret Bailes =

American sprinter (born 1951)

Personal information
- Full name: Margaret Ann Johnson Bailes
- Born: Margaret Ann Johnson; January 23, 1951 (age 75) The Bronx, New York, U.S.
Medal record
Women's athletics
Representing the United States
Olympic Games
Gold medal – first place	1968 Mexico City	4 × 100 metre relay

Margaret Ann Johnson Bailes (born January 23, 1951) is an American athlete who competed in the 100 and 200 meters.

== Early life ==
Margaret Johnson Bailes was born in the Bronx. When she was five, she moved to Eugene, Oregon with her family after her father, Albert "Duke" Johnson, decided it would be a good place to raise his children.

== Athletic career ==
When Bailes was 9, a chance attendance as a spectator to an athletics event at Hayward Field led her to meet Wendy Jerome, the wife of Harry Jerome. Wendy Jerome saw that Bailes had talent and soon became her coach. At 16 Bailes was one of the top U.S. sprinters with a fifth place in the 1967 AAU 200 m.

She competed for the United States in the 1968 Summer Olympics held in Mexico City, Mexico in the 4 × 100 meters where she won the gold medal with her teammates 100 m silver medalist Barbara Ferrell, Mildrette Netter and Olympic 100 m champion Wyomia Tyus.

Bailes still holds the all-time Oregon state high school records for 100 meters (11.29s) and 200 meters (22.95s), set in 1968 while she was a student at Churchill High School in Eugene, Oregon. She was inducted into the Oregon Sports Hall of Fame in 1991. She retired from the sport at the age of 17.
