= Debbie Miller =

Canadian sprinter

Personal information
- Born: 27 September 1950 (age 75) Halifax, Nova Scotia, Canada

Sport
- Sport: Sprinting
- Event: 100 metres

Debbie Miller (born 27 September 1951) is a Canadian sprinter. She competed in the women's 100 metres at the 1968 Summer Olympics.
