= Gloria Dourass =

Welsh athlete

Personal information
- Nationality: British (Welsh)
- Born: c. 1945 Birmingham, England

Sport
- Sport: Athletics
- Events: Sprints, 400m, middle-distance
- Club: Small Heath Harriers, Birmingham

Gloria Dourass (born c. 1945) married name Rickard is a former track and field athlete from Wales, who competed at three Commonwealth Games.

== Biography ==
Dourass was born and raised in Birmingham but qualified for Wales through her Welsh mother. Dourass was a member of the Small Heath Harriers in Birmingham and in 1966 was living in Westlands Road, Moseley and worked as a bank manager's secretary.

She won the 400 metres title at the 1966 AAA Indoor Championships and after winning the Midland Championships in May 1966, Dourass was short listed for the Commonwealth Games.

She represented the 1966 Welsh team at the 1966 British Empire and Commonwealth Games in Kingston, Jamaica, participating in four events; the 100 yards, the 220 yards, the 440 yards and the 4 × 110 yards relay, with Thelwyn Appleby, Liz Gill and Liz Parsons.

She went to a second Commonwealth Games, representing the 1970 Welsh team at the 1970 British Commonwealth Games in Edinburgh, Scotland.
