= Anne Smith (runner) =

British middle-distance runner

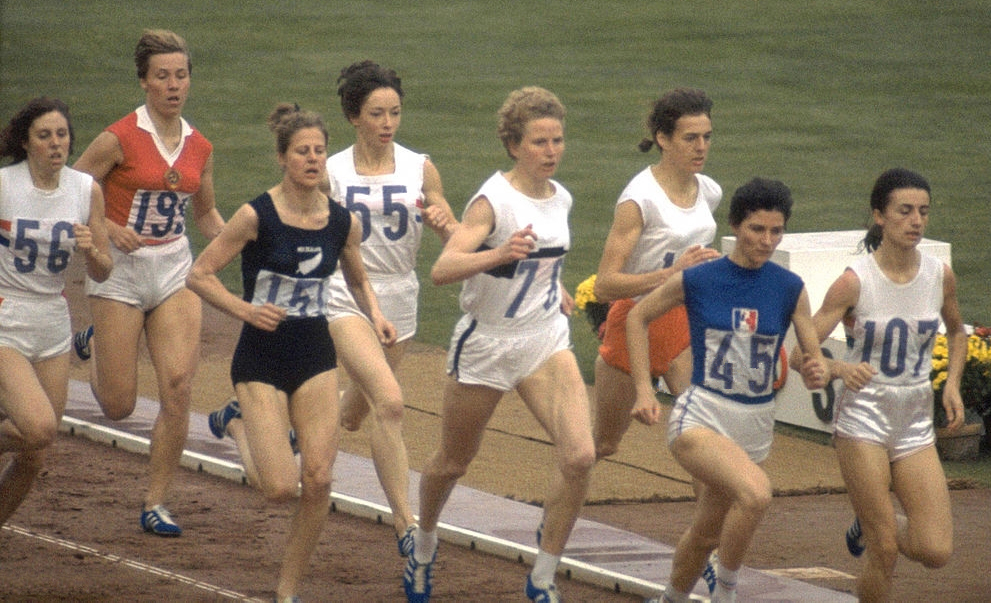
- Anne Smith (#56, at left) during the final of the 800m at the 1964 Tokyo Olympics, which was won by Ann Packer.

Personal information
- Nationality: British (English)
- Born: 1 August 1941 Amersham, England
- Died: 9 November 1993 (aged 52) London, England
- Height: 170 cm (5 ft 7 in)
- Weight: 66 kg (146 lb)

Sport
- Sport: Athletics
- Event: Sprint/middle distance
- Club: Mitcham AC
Medal record
Athletics
Representing England
British Empire & Commonwealth Games
Bronze medal – third place	1966 Kingston	880 yards

Anne Rosemary Smith (31 August 1941 – 9 November 1993) was a sprinter and middle distance runner, who specialised in the 1500 metres and mile events. She represented Great Britain and Northern Ireland at the 1964 Tokyo Olympic Games. In 1967, Smith broke two world records in one race, running 4:17.3 for the 1500 metres and 4:37.0 for the mile. These were the first 1500 m and mile world records to be ratified by the IAAF.

== Biography ==
Smith was born in Amersham, England. She was coached by Gordon Pirie, Pirie had won silver in the 5000m at the Olympics in Melbourne in 1956 but Anne Smith's preferred distance, 1500m, did not become part of the Olympic Games programme for women until 1972.

She had begun running as a 17-year-old and finished third behind Phyllis Perkins in the 880 yards event at the 1963 WAAA Championships. Smith then became the national 880 yards champion after winning the British WAAA Championships title at the 1964 WAAA Championships and would win three more times in 1965, 1966 and 1967.

At the 1964 Olympic Games in Tokyo, she reached the final of the 800 metres (women were not permitted to run any distance longer than 800 m at the time). She set a British record of 2:04.8 in the semi-final. In the final, she finished eighth in 2:05.1, the race was won by her teammate Ann Packer who recorded a world record of 2:01.1, second was France's Maryvonne Dupureur (2:01.9) and third was Marise Chamberlain of New Zealand (2:02.8).

In 1966, she won a bronze medal for England in the 880 yards at the Commonwealth Games in Kingston, she ran 2:05.0. The winner was Abby Hoffman of Canada (2:04.2), with Australia's Judy Pollock second (2:04.5).

Having set a British women’s mile record of 4:44.2 in 1966, Smith set a world record for the mile in May 1967, improving Marise Chamberlain's four-and-a-half-year-old mark of 4:41.4, when she ran 4:39.2 to win the Surrey Championship at Wimbledon Park on 13 May, also setting a British record of 4:21.0 for the 1500 metres en route.

On 3 June 1967, in Chiswick, London, Smith broke two world records in one race, these times of 4:17.3 (1500m) and 4:37.0 (mile) were the first records to be officially ratified by the IAAF.

Smith worked as a PE teacher at Sacred Heart High School, Hammersmith, Haberdashers' Aske's School for Girls, and Baradene College in Auckland. She died in London on 9 November 1993, aged 52, following a brain haemorrhage.

== Achievements ==
International Championships:

1964: 8th 800 m Olympics

1966: 3rd 880y Commonwealth Games

1968: 4th International CC

1971: 45th International CC (for New Zealand)

UK Internationals: 12 (1963-6)

National Championships: Won WAAA 880y 1964-7.

Personal bests: 440y 56.0 (1967), 800m 2:03.2 (1966), 1500m 4:17.3 (1967), mile 4:37.0 (1967).

Records
Preceded by Marise Chamberlain	Women's 1500 m world record holder 3 June 1967 – 24 October 1967	Succeeded by Maria Gommers
Preceded by Marise Chamberlain	Women's mile world record holder 13 May 1967 – 14 June 1969	Succeeded by Maria Gommers
