= Lyudmila Golomazova =

Soviet sprinter

Personal information
- Nationality: Soviet
- Born: 13 November 1947 (age 78) Almaty, Soviet Union

Sport
- Sport: Sprinting
- Event: 100 metres
Medal record
Women's athletics
Representing Soviet Union
European Indoor Championships
Silver medal – second place	1969 Belgrade	Medley relay
Bronze medal – third place	1970 Vienna	Medley relay
Summer Universiade
Gold medal – first place	1970 Turin	4x100m relay

Lyudmila Golomazova (born 13 November 1947) is a Soviet sprinter. She competed in the women's 100 metres at the 1968 Summer Olympics.
