= Avril Bowring =

British sprinter

Personal information
- Nationality: British (English)
- Born: 1 August 1942 (age 83) Tonbridge, England

Sport
- Sport: Athletics
- Event: 400 metres
- Club: Tonbridge AC; Kent AC

Avril Lorraine Bowring (née Usher) (born 1 August 1942), is a female former athlete who competed for England.

== Biography ==
Bowring lived in Three Elm Lane, Golden Green in Tonbridge.

She represented England in the 400 metres, at the 1970 British Commonwealth Games in Edinburgh, Scotland.

She ran for the Tonbridge Athletic Club and Kent Athletic Club.
