= Merewai Turukawa =

Fijian athlete and nurse (1938–2018)

- Turukawa at the 1963 South Pacific Games

Personal information
- National team: Fiji
- Born: 23 June 1938 Voua, Fiji
- Died: May 2018 (aged 79)

Sport
- Sport: Track and field
- Events: Shot put; Discus; Javelin

Merewai Turukawa (1938–2018) was a Fijian athlete who won the first-ever gold medal at the South Pacific Games. She competed in shot put, discus and javelin events.

== Early life ==
Merewai Turukawa Vesikula was born 23 June 1938 in the village of Voua, near Sigatoka in the Nadroga-Navosa Province in the south-west of Viti Levu, the largest island of Fiji. In 1955 she moved to Suva to pursue her studies to become a nurse.

== Sporting activities ==
Turukawa competed regularly around Fiji at athletics club level, and dominated the field events. Her first opportunity to compete internationally came in the 1963 South Pacific Games, which were held in Fiji's capital, Suva. She competed in shot put, discus and javelin events and won the gold medal in all three. The medal for the shot put was the first to be awarded at what were the inaugural South Pacific Games, giving her the distinction of winning the Games' first gold medal. She also competed in the 1966 South Pacific Games, held in Noumea, New Caledonia, but was suffering from a knee injury and only managed a silver medal, in the discus.

Turukawa was inducted into the Fiji Association of Sports and National Olympic Committee Hall of Fame in 1994. In 1964 she had established a Fijian record for the shot put, and this still stood at the time of her induction. She was still competing in 1994, taking part in the Oceania Veterans Athletics Championships and winning a gold in the shot put and a silver in the javelin competition.

== Personal life ==
Turukawa became a senior health sister in Fiji's Ministry of Health and represented Fiji at several international meetings. She married and had three children. She died in May 2018.
