= Sandra Brown (sprinter) =

Australian sprinter

Personal information
- Nationality: Australian
- Born: 3 February 1946 (age 80)

Sport
- Sport: Sprinting
- Event: 400 metres
Medal record
Women's Athletics
Representing Australia
Commonwealth Games
Silver medal – second place	1970 Edinburgh	Women's 400m

Sandra Brown (born 3 February 1946) is an Australian sprinter. She competed in the women's 400 metres at the 1968 Summer Olympics.
