= Alma Rosa Martínez =

Mexican sprinter

Personal information
- Born: 22 August 1951 (age 75) San Luis Potosí, Mexico
- Height: 1.59 m (5 ft 3 in)
- Weight: 53 kg (117 lb)

Sport
- Sport: Sprinting
- Event: 100 metres

Alma Rosa Martínez (born 22 August 1951) is a retired Mexican sprinter. She competed in the women's 4 × 100 metres relay at the 1968 Summer Olympics.

== International competitions ==
Year	Competition	Venue	Position	Event	Notes
Representing Mexico
1968	Pan American Games	Mexico City, Mexico	12th (h)	4 × 100 m relay	47.0

== Personal bests ==
- 100 metres – 12.2h (1968)
