= Lydia Stephens =

Kenyan sprinter

Personal information
- Nationality: Kenyan
- Born: 1 November 1945 (age 79)

Sport
- Sport: Sprinting
- Event: 100 metres

Lydia Stephens (born 1 November 1945) is a Kenyan sprinter. She competed in the women's 100 metres at the 1968 Summer Olympics.
