= Margaret Parker (javelin thrower) =

Australian javelin thrower

Medal record

Women's athletics

Representing Australia

British Empire and Commonwealth Games
| Gold medal – first place | 1966 Kingston | Javelin throw |

Margaret Adele Parker-Koscik (born 30 June 1949) is an Australian former track and field athlete who competed in the javelin throw.

She emerged as a junior at national level in the mid-1960s, coming second at the national junior championships in 1964, then returning to win in 1965. At senior level she was twice runner-up at the Australian Athletics Championships, first in 1965 then again in 1971.

Parker's sole major international achievement was a gold medal at the 1966 British Empire and Commonwealth Games held in Kingston, Jamaica. She defeated former champion and fellow Australian Anna Pazera in the final, throwing the spear 51.38 m (168 ft 6 3/4 in) to top the podium.

She married fellow Australian athlete Sig Koscik in 1972.
