= Wilma van den Berg =

Dutch sprinter (born 1947)

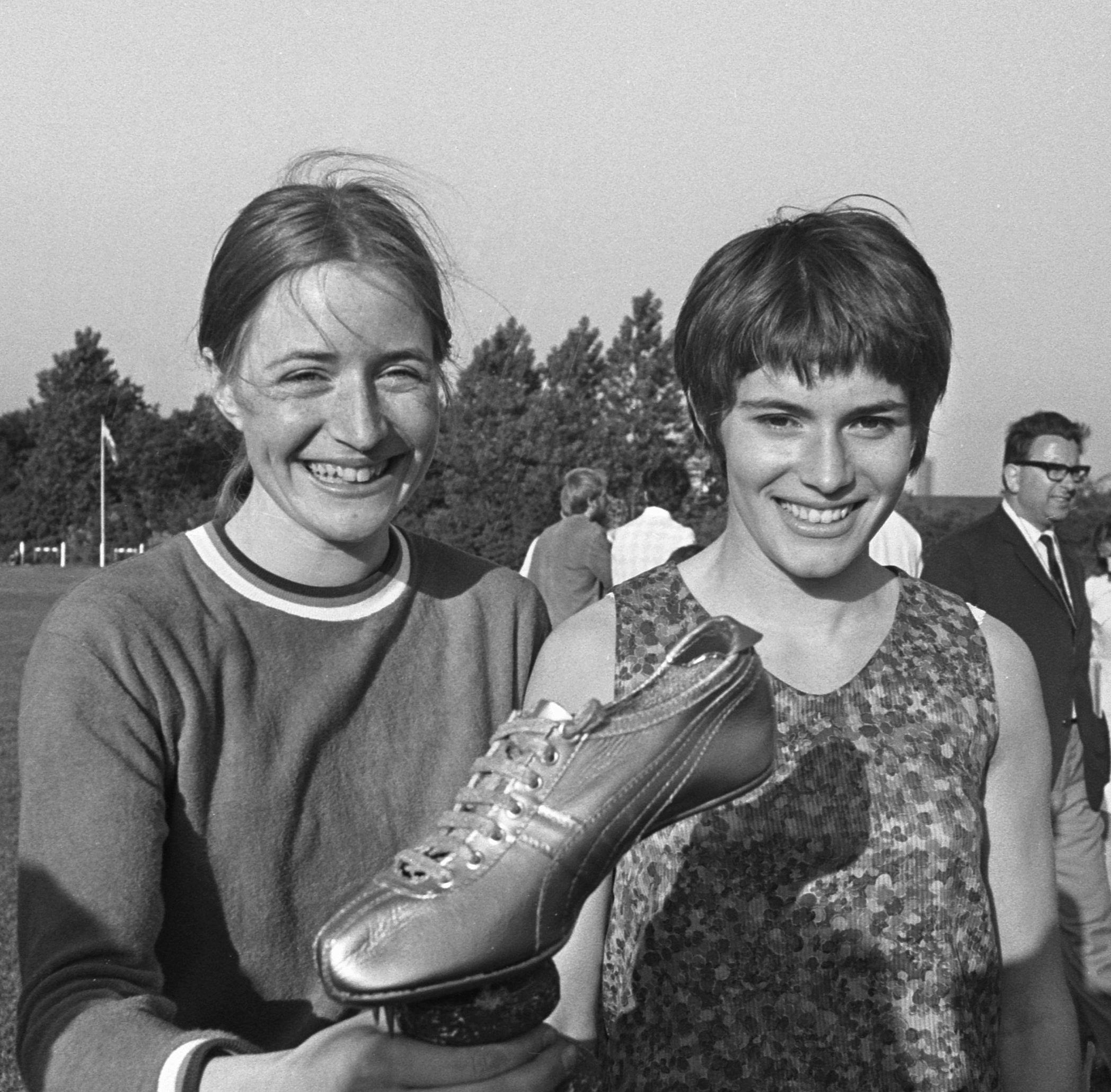
- Wilma and Riet van den Berg in 1970

Personal information
- Full name: Wilhelmina Catharina Maria Martina "Wilma" van Gool-van den Berg
- Born: Wilhelmina Catharina Maria Martina van Gool; 11 August 1947 (age 78) Uden, the Netherlands
- Height: 1.65 m (5 ft 5 in)
- Weight: 56 kg (123 lb)

Sport
- Sport: Sprint
- Club: De Keijen
Medal record
Women's athletics
Representing the Netherlands
European Championships
Silver medal – second place	1969 Athens	100 m
European Indoor Championships
Bronze medal – third place	1970 Vienna	60 m
Summer Universiade
Silver medal – second place	1970 Turin	100 m
Bronze medal – third place	1970 Turin	200 m

Wilhelmina Catharina Maria Martina "Wilma" van den Berg, (born 11 August 1947), married name van Gool , is a Dutch former sprinter, two-time Olympian, silver medalist in the European Championships and Universiade, Dutch national champion, and 1969 Dutch Female Athlete of the Year.

== Biography ==
Van den Berg won the Dutch national championship in both the 100 m event and the 200 m in 1967, 1969–72, and 1976; she also won the 100 m event in 1974.

She won a silver medal at the 1969 European Championships in the 100 m event, and a bronze medal at the 1970 European Indoor Championships in the 60 m. At the 1970 Summer Universiade she won a silver medal in the 100 m event, and a bronze medal in the 200 m.

She competed at the 1968 Summer Olympics and 1972 Summer Olympics in the 100 m and 200 m sprint and 4 × 100 m relay. She finished in fourth place in the relay in 1968; individually, she did not reach the finals.

She had qualified for the semifinals in the 200 m sprints at the Munich Olympics, and the 23.22 that she ran in the quarterfinals was faster than the time in the quarterfinals of the eventual champion, Renate Stecher of East Germany. However, after the killing of 11 Israeli athletes in the Munich Massacre, and the Olympics not being cancelled, she withdrew from the competition in sympathy with the Israeli victims. She said that she was leaving in protest of the "obscene" decision to continue with the Olympic Games. The organizers of the 1973 Maccabiah Games in Israel invited her to join, and she ran as a pacer—not as a competitor.

In 1969 she was selected as the Dutch Female Athlete of the Year. Her personal bests were 11.1 seconds in the 100 m (1972), and 23.22 seconds in the 200 m (1972).

== See also ==
- List of European Athletics Championships medalists (women)
- List of European Athletics Indoor Championships medalists (women)
- List of 100 metres national champions (women)
- Women's 4 × 100 metres relay world record progression

Awards
Preceded by Mia Gommers	KNAU Cup; 1969	Succeeded by Ilja Keizer-Laman
