= Deidre Watkinson =

British

Personal information
- Nationality: British (English)
- Born: 4 June 1941 (age 85) Droxford, Hampshire, England

Sport
- Sport: Athletics
- Event: 400m/440y
- Club: Gosport AC
Medal record
Athletics
Representing England
British Empire & Commonwealth Games
Silver medal – second place	1966 Kingston	440 yards

Deidre Ann Watkinson also spelt Deirdre (born 4 June 1941), is a female former athlete who competed for England.

== Biography ==
Watkinson finished second behind Joy Grieveson in the 440 yards event at the 1965 WAAA Championships.

She represented the England team and won a silver medal in the 440 yards, at the 1966 British Empire and Commonwealth Games in Kingston, Jamaica.
