= Michèle Alayrangues =

French sprinter

Personal information
- Nationality: French
- Born: 15 May 1947 (age 79) Belfort, France

Sport
- Sport: Sprinting
- Event: 4 × 100 metres relay
Medal record
Representing France
Summer Universiade
| Gold medal – first place | 1967 Tokyo | 4x100m relay |

Michèle Alayrangues Halter (born 15 May 1947) is a French sprinter. She competed in the women's 4 × 100 metres relay at the 1968 Summer Olympics.
