= Ron Pickering =

British athlete (1930–1991)

Ron Pickering OBE
- Born: Ronald James Pickering; 4 May 1930; Hackney, England
- Died: 13 February 1991 (aged 60); Digswell, Hertfordshire, England
- Occupations: Athletics coach BBC Sport commentator
- Spouse: Jean Desforges (m. 1954)
- Children: 2; including Shaun

Ronald James Pickering OBE (4 May 1930 – 13 February 1991) was an athletics coach and BBC sports commentator.

== Early life and education ==
Pickering was born in Hackney. His father was a sign fixer. He became head boy at West Ham Secondary School (later to become Stratford Grammar School and now Stratford School) when he met the head girl and future wife Jean Desforges. She won a gold medal in the 4 x 100 metres relay at the 1950 European Athletics Championships, a bronze medal in the 4 x 100 metres relay at the 1952 Olympic Games in Helsinki (and was fifth in the 80 metres hurdles), a gold medal in the long jump at the 1954 European Athletics Championships, and bronze medals in both the long jump and 80 metres hurdles at the 1954 Commonwealth Games in Vancouver. She married Pickering in 1954.

He did national service in the King's Own Royal Regiment, and studied for a diploma in physical education at Carnegie College of Physical Education in Leeds and then a master's degree in education at Leicester University. He became a teacher of physical education at Stratford Grammar School and then Wanstead County High School. He became a coach of athletics, moving to South Wales in 1960 to become the National Coach for Wales. He coached Lynn Davies to Olympic gold in the Long jump in Tokyo 1964. He became a sports commentator with the BBC, commentating mainly on athletics, but also gymnastics, ski jumping and downhill skiing. He was also managing director of the Lee Valley Regional Park from its inception in 1967, leaving Wales to move to Hertfordshire. He continued to commentate up to his sudden death in 1991. Following his death his widow, Jean, set up the Ron Pickering Memorial Fund to continue the family's support of young athletes.

== Career ==
Pickering moved to Cardiff to become a national athletics coach for Wales from 1961 to 1966. In July 1962, he and Barney Mulrenan were co-commentators for the Home Service in Wales on the Welsh Games, a weekend athletics meeting trying to rekindle the spirit of the Empire Games.

Pickering was a coach with the British team at the 1964 Summer Olympics in Tokyo and with the Welsh team at the 1966 Commonwealth Games in Jamaica. He coached several Olympic athletes, including Lynn Davies, who won gold medals in the long jump at the 1964 Olympics, the 1966 European Athletics Championships and the 1966 Commonwealth Games, and also represented Britain in the 4 × 100 metres relay in Tokyo.

He was a recreational manager at Lee Valley Regional Park for two years before becoming an independent consultant in recreational planning management. He was a television commentator at the 1968 Summer Olympic Games in Mexico City and continued in broadcasting for over 20 years. He was the first host of the BBC1 children's sports programme We Are the Champions, a show he presented from 1973 until his death. He was known for his catchphrase, "Away you go!", at the end of each show, at which point all the teams would jump into the swimming pool (pool events always made up the final phase of the competition). He also co-presented the programme Superstars from 1973 to 1985 with David Vine.

He was a leading proponent of a scheme to use a disused banana warehouse on the Isle of Dogs as an indoor training centre, which later became the London Arena (demolished in 2006). He was president of Haringey Athletic Club, whose members included Seb Coe and Mike McFarlane. Linford Christie dedicated his gold medal in the 100 metres at the 1992 Summer Olympics in Barcelona to Pickering. He was appointed Officer of the Order of the British Empire (OBE) in the 1986 Birthday Honours, for services to athletics.

== Death ==
Pickering died at home in Digswell a few weeks after a heart bypass operation. He was surrounded by his wife, their son and daughter. His son, Shaun Pickering, represented Great Britain in the shot put at the 1996 Summer Olympics in Atlanta, and won a bronze medal for Wales in the shot put at the 1998 Commonwealth Games.

The Ron Pickering Memorial Fund was founded in 1991, and supports hundreds of young athletes each year. Shaun Pickering died on 11 May 2023, at the age of 61.
