= Ana Ramacake =

Fijian athlete and hotel owner

Personal information
- Born: 24 December 1937 Visama, Tailevu Province, Fiji
- Died: 17 July 2014 (aged 76)

Sport
- Country: Fiji
- Sport: Track and field
- Events: 100 meters, 200 meters, long jump, 4 × 100 m relay, 80 m hurdles
Medal record
Women's athletics
Representing Fiji
South Pacific Games
Gold medal – first place	1963 Suva	100 m
Gold medal – first place	1963 Suva	4 x 100 m relay
Gold medal – first place	1966 Nouméa	4 x 100 m relay
Gold medal – first place	1966 Nouméa	Long jump
Silver medal – second place	1963 Suva	200 m
Silver medal – second place	1963 Suva	Long jump
Silver medal – second place	1966 Nouméa	100 m
Silver medal – second place	1966 Nouméa	200 m
Bronze medal – third place	1963 Suva	80 m hurdles

Ana Ramacake (24 December 1937 – 17 July 2014) was a Fijian athlete and, together with her husband, the operator of several hotels in Fiji. Sprint (running)

== Early life ==
Ana Ramacake came from the village of Visama in the Tailevu Province in the south-east of Fiji's main island of Viti Levu. She studied at the Lelean Memorial School, a co-educational school run by the Methodist Church of Fiji and Rotuma. Her father, Misaeli Ramacake, was one of the first Fijians to play rugby.

== Athletic career ==
Ramacake first represented Fiji at the age of 29 in 1963 at the inaugural South Pacific Games, held in Fiji's capital, Suva. She won 2 gold, 2 silver and 1 bronze medal, competing in the sprints and the long jump. In the 1966 South Pacific Games in Nouméa, New Caledonia, she won 2 gold and 2 silver medals. Also in 1966, she travelled alone to Kingston, Jamaica, without a manager or coach, to represent Fiji in the 1966 British Empire and Commonwealth Games. While countries had in the past been represented by just one man at these games, it was the first occasion in which a country's only representative was a woman. While in Jamaica she received training from Ron Pickering, who was coaching the Welsh team. Pickering had coached Lynn Davies who had won the long jump gold medal at the 1964 Summer Olympics. Ramacake finished 15th in the long jump in Jamaica. At the 1967 Fiji national championships, she set national records in the 200 metres and the long jump, which were not broken for 25 years. She was inducted into the Fiji Association of Sports and National Olympic Committee Hall of Fame in 1993.

== Later life ==
Ramacake married John Birch. They had two daughters. The elder became a swimming champion in Fiji. Her husband was a long-time president of the Fiji Hotel Association and the couple owned two hotels in Nadi. She died on 17 July 2014, predeceasing her husband.
