= Oyeronke Akindele =

Nigerian sprinter

Personal information
- Nationality: Nigerian
- Born: 8 April 1946 (age 79) Oyo, British Nigeria

Sport
- Sport: Sprinting
- Event: 100 metres

Oyeronke Akindele (born 8 April 1946) is a Nigerian sprinter. She competed in the women's 100 metres at the 1968 Summer Olympics.
