= Jenny Lamy =

Australian sprinter (born 1949)

Medal record

Women's athletics

Representing Australia

Olympic Games
Bronze medal – third place	1968 Mexico City	200 metres

Commonwealth Games
Gold medal – first place	1966 Kingston	4x110y relay
Gold medal – first place	1970 Edinburgh	4x100 m relay
Gold medal – first place	1974 Christchurch	4x100 m relay
Silver medal – second place	1966 Kingston	220 yards

Jennifer Frances Lamy (born 28 February 1949) is a former Australian sprinter.

Lamy's international debut came at the 1966 British Empire and Commonwealth Games in Kingston, Jamaica, where she won a silver medal in the 220 yards race behind countrywoman Dianne Burge and shared in a sprint relay gold medal.

Still a junior at the 1968 Summer Olympics in Mexico City she won a bronze medal in 200 metres behind the Polish gold medalist Irena Szewińska and another Australian, Raelene Boyle.

Lamy went on to compete in two further Commonwealth Games, winning gold-medals on each occasion as part of the Australian 4 × 100 metres relay teams.

In her career, she won three Australian national championships: the 200 m in 1967 and the 100 m/200 m sprint double in 1969.

Jenny was also one of the Australian 4x100 team who won Gold at the 1969 Pacific Conference Games in Tokyo.

She received an Australian Sports Medal in 2000 and was inducted into the Athletics Australia Hall of Fame in 2014.
