= Olajumoke Bodunrin =

Nigerian sprinter

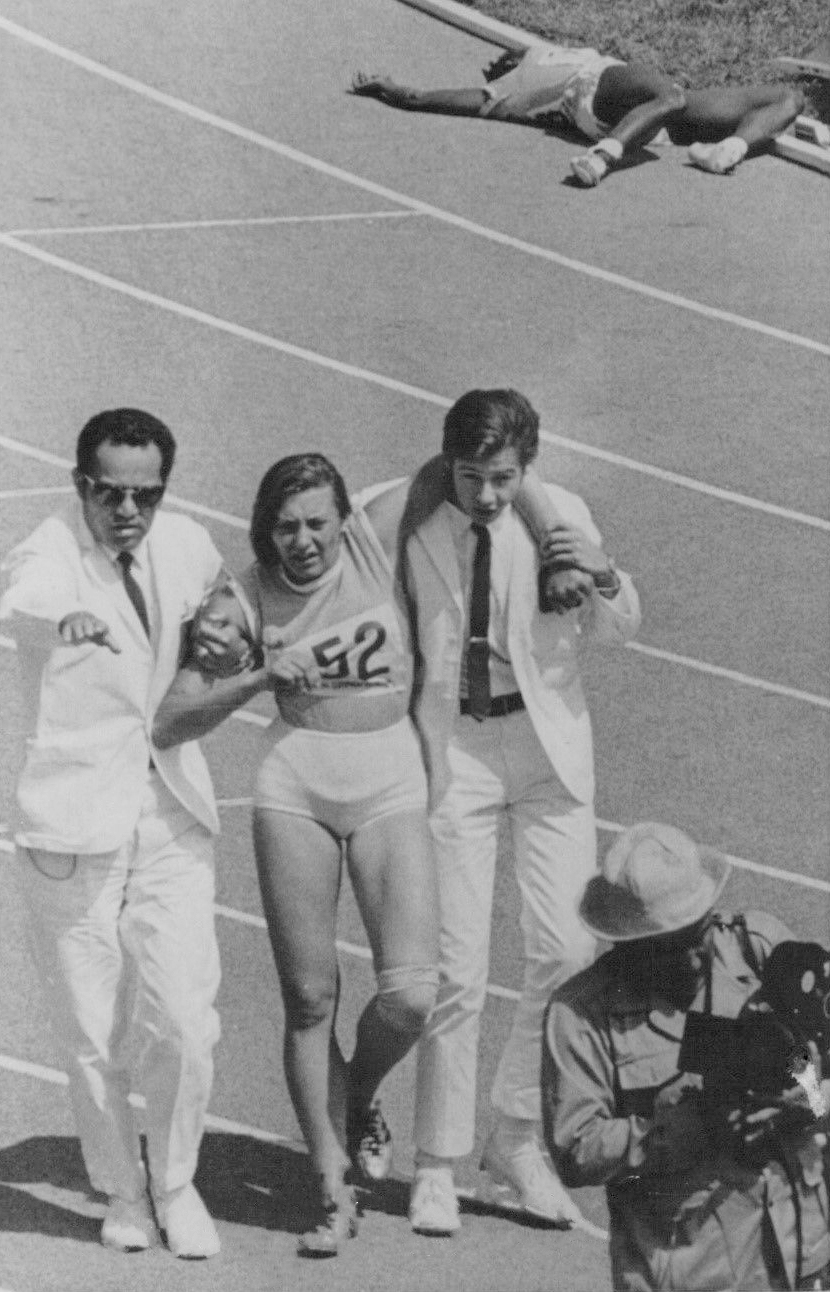
- Olajumoke Bodunrin (in background) collapsed from exhaustion at the end of the 400 metre race at the 1968 Summer Olympics.

Personal information
- Born: 7 February 1945 (age 81) Odo-Asanyin, Ogun State, Nigeria
- Height: 1.52 m (5 ft 0 in)
- Weight: 44 kg (97 lb)

Sport
- Sport: Athletics
- Sprint: 100 m, 400 m

Achievements and titles
- Personal best(s): 100 m – 11.71 (1968); 400 m – 56.1 (1968)
Medal record
Representing Nigeria
All-Africa Games
Gold medal – first place	1965 Brazzaville	100 metres

Olajumoke Bodunrin (born 7 February 1945) is a retired Nigerian sprinter. Regarded as "Africa's fastest woman" during her career, Olajumoke claimed gold at the 1965 All-Africa Games in Brazzaville, Congo before going on to represent Nigeria at the 1968 Summer Olympics in Mexico.
