= Judy Amoore =

Australian runner (born 1940)

Personal information
- Full name: Judith Florence Amoore
- Born: 25 June 1940 (age 86) Melbourne, Victoria, Australia
- Height: 5 ft 4 in (163 cm)
- Weight: 121 lb (55 kg)
Medal record
Women's athletics
Representing Australia
Olympic Games
Bronze medal – third place	1964 Tokyo	400 metres
Commonwealth Games
Gold medal – first place	1966 Kingston	440 yards
Silver medal – second place	1966 Kingston	880 yards

Judith Florence Amoore-Pollock, née Amoore, (25 June 1940) is an Australian former runner. She was born in Melbourne, Victoria.

At the 1964 Summer Olympics in Tokyo, she won a bronze medal in the first 400 metres race for females, only beaten by countrywoman Betty Cuthbert (gold) and Brit Ann Packer (silver). At the 1966 British Empire and Commonwealth Games in Kingston, Jamaica, she won the 440 yards race, a silver medal over 880 yards, and was fourth in the 220 yards.

At the Australian championships in February 1964, she placed 3rd in 440 yards and 2nd in 880 yards. In 1966 she competed in 100 yards without reaching the final, but placed 3rd in 220 Yards, 1st in 440 yards and in 880 yards. In the state championships of Victoria, she won both 220, 440 and 880 yards races.

She set world records at 440 yards (1965), 800 metres (1967) and 880 yards (1967) before retiring due to pregnancy in 1968. She made a comeback in 1971, running some of her best times ever to make the team for the 1972 Summer Olympics in Munich. She was track and field team captain at Munich, but was unable to compete because of injuries and retired soon after the Games, again for family reasons.

In 1976, she made another comeback, now concentrating on 800 metres and 1500 metres events. The veteran was selected in her third Olympic team after winning the 1500 metres at the Australian National Championships and running second to Charlene Rendina over 800 metres.

At the age of 36, she became the oldest Australian female Olympian at the 1976 Summer Olympics in Montreal, Quebec. Running in the 800 metres, she just missed the final, clocking her fastest ever time of 1:59.93 for fifth in her semi-final. Despite setting another personal best time in the 1500 metres, she was run out of her heat.

She was inducted into the Sport Australia Hall of Fame in 1988.

Records
Preceded by (United Kingdom) Ann Packer	Women's 800 metres World Record Holder; 1967-06-28 – 1968-07-20	Succeeded by (Socialist Federal Republic of Yugoslavia) Vera Nikolic
