= Dianne Burge =

Australian sprinter (1953–2024)

Medal record

Women's athletics

Representing Australia

Commonwealth Games
| Gold medal – first place | 1966 Kingston | 100 yards |
| Gold medal – first place | 1966 Kingston | 220 yards |
| Gold medal – first place | 1966 Kingston | 4×110y relay |

Dianne Burge, OAM (née Bowering, 9 October 1943 – 11 June 2024) was an Australian sprinter who competed in two Olympic Games and won three gold medals at the Commonwealth Games. She was awarded the title South Australian 'Athlete of the Century' by Athletics South Australia. Burge died on 11 June 2024, at the age of 80.

== Early athletics career ==
In 1963, Adelaide sprinter Diane Bowering won the Australian 100-yard Championships in an upset. She was virtually unknown outside her home state but ended the year ranked as #3 in the world. She competed for Adelaide Harriers and was coached by Len Barnes who nicknamed her 'the twerp'.

== International athletics career ==
In 1964 Bowering ran second in the national 100y title and earned a place on the Australian team for the 1964 Summer Olympic Games in Tokyo. At the Games, she did not progress past the second round of the 100 metres, but made the final of the 4 × 100 metres relay with the Australian team.

After her marriage, running as Dianne Burge, at the 1966 British Empire and Commonwealth Games in Kingston, Jamaica, she won gold medals at 100 yards, 220 yards and in the 4×110 yards relay. At the end of the year, she was world-ranked #6 for 100 metres and #5 for 200 metres.

In 1967, she won the 100 m and 200 m at the United States versus British Commonwealth meet in Los Angeles, beating Olympic champion Wyomia Tyus and was ranked #2 in the world for 100 m and #3 for 200 m by Track and Field News.

Burge won the sprint double at the 1968 Australian Championships, running times of 11.3 and 23.0 with the 100 metres time a new Australian record. Considered a medal favourite at the Mexico Olympics, she was affected by illness in Mexico City and placed sixth in the 100-metres final.

She was ranked sixth in the world for 100 metres, when she retired from the sport in early 1969.

== Awards ==
Burge was awarded the inaugural Sportswomen's Association of Australia (SA Division) 'Sportswoman of the Year' award in 1966.

She was named as the 'Athlete of the Century' by Athletics South Australia.

== Statistics ==
Personal Bests

| Event | Time | Wind | Place | Date |
|---|---|---|---|---|
| 60 m | 7.2 | - | Brisbane, Australia | 13 March 1968 |
| 100 y | 10.4 | - | Sydney, Australia | 18 March 1966 |
| Automatic | 10.58 | +0.1 | Kingston, Jamaica | 8 August 1966 |
| 100 m | 11.2 | - | Mexico City, Mexico | 4 October 1968 |
| Automatic | 11.33 | +1.8 | Mexico City, Mexico | 14 October 1968 |
| 200 m | 23.0 | - | Adelaide, Australia | 10 March 1968 |
| Automatic | 23.65 | 0.0 | Mexico City, Mexico | 17 March 1968 |
| 220 y | 23.73 | 0.0 | Kingston, Jamaica | 11 August 1966 |

World Rankings - 100 m and 200 m

| Year | 100 m | 200 m |
|---|---|---|
| 1963 | 3 | - |
| 1964 | - | - |
| 1965 | - | - |
| 1966 | 6 | 5 |
| 1967 | 3 | 2 |
| 1968 | 6 | - |

Australian Championships Record

| Year | 100y/100 m | 220y/200 m |
|---|---|---|
| 1963 | 1 | DNQ |
| 1964 | 2 | DNQ |
| 1965 | 3 | 1 |
| 1966 | 2 | 5 |
| 1967 | 1 | DNQ |
| 1968 | 1 | 1 |

- DNQ=Did not qualify for final (only six athletes per final in this era)
