= List of Balkan Athletics Championships winners (women) =

The Balkan Athletics Championships is a regional athletics competition held between nations from the Balkans and organized by Balkan Athletics. The first games were held in Athens in 1929 as an unofficial event, receiving official sanction the following year.

The competition was not held from 1941 to 1952, although an unofficial Balkan Games was held in 1946 and a Balkan and Central European Games in 1947 involving the same countries plus Hungary. The first women's champions were declared at those events, and a women's programme continued upon the official post-World War II relaunch in 1953.

== Champions ==
=== 100 metres ===
- 1946: Luiza Ernst (ROM)
- 1947: Alma Butia (YUG)
- 1953: Not held
- 1954: Not held
- 1955: Not held
- 1956: Not held
- 1957: Ioana Luta (ROM)
- 1958: Veselina Kolarova (BUL)
- 1959: Ioana Petrescu (ROM)
- 1960: Crista Maksay (ROM)
- 1961: Olga Šikovec (YUG)
- 1962: Olga Šikovec (YUG)
- 1963: Snezhana Kerkova (BUL)
- 1964: Veselina Kolarova (BUL)
- 1965: Ljiljana Petnjarić (YUG)
- 1966: Ljiljana Petnjarić (YUG)
- 1967: Marijana Lubej (YUG)
- 1968: Marijana Lubej (YUG)
- 1969: Mariana Goth (ROM)
- 1970: Mariana Goth (ROM)
- 1971: Valeria Bufanu (ROM)
- 1972: Ivanka Valkova (BUL)
- 1973: Jelica Pavličić (YUG)
- 1974: Jelica Pavličić (YUG)
- 1975: Liliyana Panayotova-Ivanova (BUL)
- 1976: Liliyana Panayotova-Ivanova (BUL)
- 1977: Ivanka Valkova (BUL)
- 1978: Liliyana Panayotova-Ivanova (BUL)
- 1979: Liliyana Panayotova-Ivanova (BUL)
- 1980: Sofka Popova (BUL)
- 1981: Galina Penkova (BUL)
- 1982: Natalia Caraiosifoglu (ROM)
- 1983: Atanaska Atanasova (BUL)
- 1984: Anelia Nuneva (BUL)
- 1985: Anelia Nuneva (BUL)
- 1986: Anelia Nuneva (BUL)
- 1988: Nadezhda Georgieva (BUL)
- 1989: Nadezhda Georgieva (BUL)
- 1990: Voula Patoulidou (GRE)
- 1992: Zlatka Georgieva (BUL)
- 1994: Ekaterini Koffa (GRE)
- 1996: Petya Pendareva (BUL)
- 1997: Aksel Gürcan Demirtaş (TUR)
- 1998: Vukosava Đapić (YUG)
- 1999: Evelina Lisenco (ROM)
- 2000: Evelina Lisenco (ROM)
- 2001: Ioanna Kafetzi (GRE)
- 2002: Ekaterina Mashova (BUL)
- 2003: Marina Vasarmidou (GRE)
- 2004: Vukosava Đapić (SCG)
- 2005: Georgia Kokloni (GRE)

=== 200 metres ===
- 1957: Ioana Luta (ROM)
- 1958: Veselina Kolarova (BUL)
- 1959: Ioana Petrescu (ROM)
- 1960: Olga Šikovec (YUG)
- 1961: Nada Simić (YUG)
- 1962: Olga Šikovec (YUG)
- 1963: Olga Šikovec (YUG)
- 1964: Ioana Petrescu (ROM)
- 1965: Ioana Petrescu (ROM)
- 1966: Ljiljana Petnjarić (YUG)
- 1967: Marijana Lubej (YUG)
- 1968: Mariana Goth (ROM)
- 1969: Mariana Goth (ROM)
- 1970: Ivanka Venkova (BUL)
- 1971: Valeria Bufanu (ROM)
- 1972: Valeria Bufanu (ROM)
- 1973: Jelica Pavličić (YUG)
- 1974: Jelica Pavličić (YUG)
- 1975: Liliyana Panayotova-Ivanova (BUL)
- 1976: Liliyana Panayotova-Ivanova (BUL)
- 1977: Maria Stoyanova (BUL)
- 1978: Liliyana Panayotova-Ivanova (BUL)
- 1979: Liliyana Panayotova-Ivanova (BUL)
- 1980: Mariya Shishkova (BUL)
- 1981: Galina Penkova (BUL)
- 1982: Natalia Caraiosifoglu (ROM)
- 1983: Atanaska Atanasova (BUL)
- 1984: Nadezhda Georgieva (BUL)
- 1985: Anelia Nuneva (BUL)
- 1986: Anelia Nuneva (BUL)
- 1988: Nadezhda Georgieva (BUL)
- 1989: Nadezhda Georgieva (BUL)
- 1990: Marina Filipović (YUG)
- 1992: Zlatka Georgieva (BUL)
- 1994: Ekaterina Tocheva (BUL)
- 1996: Marina Filipović (YUG)
- 1997: Marina Filipović (YUG)
- 1998: Vukosava Đapić (YUG)
- 1999: Evelina Lisenco (ROM)
- 2000: Nora Ivanova (TUR)
- 2001: Monika Gachevska (BUL)
- 2002: Ionela Târlea (ROM)
- 2003: Olga Kaidantzi (GRE)
- 2004: Monika Gachevska (BUL)
- 2005: Klodiana Shala (ALB)

=== 400 metres ===
- 1959: Anica Slamnik (YUG)
- 1960: Nada Simić (YUG)
- 1961: Nada Simić (YUG)
- 1962: Nada Simić (YUG)
- 1963: Florentina Stancu (ROM)
- 1964: Gizella Farkas (YUG)
- 1965: Ljiljana Petnjarić (YUG)
- 1966: Ika Maričić (YUG)
- 1967: Ika Maričić (YUG)
- 1968: Vera Nikolić (YUG)
- 1969: Ileana Silai (ROM)
- 1970: Alexandrina Badescu (ROM)
- 1971: Stefka Yordanova (BUL)
- 1972: Ivanka Bonova (BUL)
- 1973: Lilyana Tomova (BUL)
- 1974: Jelica Pavličić (YUG)
- 1975: Jelica Pavličić (YUG)
- 1976: Jelica Pavličić (YUG)
- 1977: Mariana Suman (ROM)
- 1978: Elena Tărîță (ROM)
- 1979: Elena Tărîță (ROM)
- 1980: Elena Tărîță (ROM)
- 1981: Galina Penkova (BUL)
- 1982: Daniela Matei (ROM)
- 1983: Katya Ilieva (BUL)
- 1984: Rositsa Stamenova (BUL)
- 1985: Rositsa Stamenova (BUL)
- 1986: Rositsa Stamenova (BUL)
- 1988: Rositsa Stamenova (BUL)
- 1989: Milena Saracheva (BUL)
- 1990: Yuliana Marinova (BUL)
- 1992: Aura Cracea (ROM)
- 1994: Elena Vizitiu (ROM)
- 1996: Andreea Burlacu (ROM)
- 1997: Marina Filipović (YUG)
- 1998: Christina Panagou (GRE)
- 1999: Tsvetelina Kirilova (BUL)
- 2000: Otilia Ruicu-Eșanu (ROM)
- 2001: Monica Bumbescu (ROM)
- 2002: Ramona Popovici (ROM)
- 2003: Nedyalka Nedkova (BUL)
- 2004: Mariyana Dimitrova (BUL)
- 2005: Mariyana Dimitrova (BUL)

=== 800 metres ===
- 1947: Edith Treybal (ROM)
- 1953: Not held
- 1954: Not held
- 1955: Not held
- 1956: Not held
- 1957: Milica Rajkov (YUG)
- 1958: Gül Çiray (TUR)
- 1959: Elisabeta Teodorof (ROM)
- 1960: Gül Çiray (TUR)
- 1961: Florica Grecescu (ROM)
- 1962: Florica Grecescu (ROM)
- 1963: Milica Rajkov-Ninkov (YUG)
- 1964: Florica Grecescu (ROM)
- 1965: Vera Nikolić (YUG)
- 1966: Vera Nikolić (YUG)
- 1967: Ileana Silai (ROM)
- 1968: Vera Nikolić (YUG)
- 1969: Ileana Silai (ROM)
- 1970: Vera Nikolić (YUG)
- 1971: Ileana Silai (ROM)
- 1972: Ileana Silai (ROM)
- 1973: Svetla Zlateva (BUL)
- 1974: Mariana Suman (ROM)
- 1975: Nikolina Shtereva (BUL)
- 1976: Mariana Suman (ROM)
- 1977: Mariana Suman (ROM)
- 1978: Elena Tărîță (ROM)
- 1979: Totka Petrova (BUL)
- 1980: Nikolina Shtereva (BUL)
- 1981: Fița Lovin (ROM)
- 1982: Doina Melinte (ROM)
- 1983: Elena Lina (ROM)
- 1984: Fița Lovin (ROM)
- 1985: Mitica Constantin (ROM)
- 1986: Slobodanka Čolović (YUG)
- 1988: Paula Ivan (ROM)
- 1989: Ella Kovacs (ROM)
- 1990: Aurica Mitrea (ROM)
- 1992: Petya Strashilova (BUL)
- 1994: Evangelia Tsouraki (GRE)
- 1996: Laura Itcou (ROM)
- 1997: Carmen Stanciu (ROM)
- 1998: Tsvetelina Kirilova (BUL)
- 1999: Tsvetelina Kirilova (BUL)
- 2000: Öznur Dursun (TUR)
- 2001: Tsvetelina Kirilova (BUL)
- 2002: Elena Antoci (ROM)
- 2003: Alina Cucerzan (ROM)
- 2004: Elena Antoci (ROM)
- 2005: Corina Dumbrăvean (ROM)

=== 1500 metres ===
- 1969: Vasilena Amzina (BUL)
- 1970: Vera Nikolić (YUG)
- 1971: Vera Nikolić (YUG)
- 1972: Tonka Petrova (BUL)
- 1973: Tonka Petrova (BUL)
- 1974: Lilyana Tomova (BUL)
- 1975: Nikolina Shtereva (BUL)
- 1976: Natalia Mărășescu (ROM)
- 1977: Ileana Silai (ROM)
- 1978: Maricica Puică (ROM)
- 1979: Totka Petrova (BUL)
- 1980: Nikolina Shtereva (BUL)
- 1981: Fița Lovin (ROM)
- 1982: Doina Melinte (ROM)
- 1983: Marica Mršić (YUG)
- 1984: Doina Melinte (ROM)
- 1985: Nikolina Shtereva (BUL)
- 1986: Nikolina Shtereva (BUL)
- 1988: Paula Ivan (ROM)
- 1989: Cătălina Gheorghiu (ROM)
- 1990: Violeta Szekely (ROM)
- 1992: Elena Fidatov (ROM)
- 1994: Leontia Sălăgeanu (ROM)
- 1996: Lavinia Miroiu (ROM)
- 1997: Luminiţa Gogîrlea (ROM)
- 1998: Evelina Danailova (BUL)
- 1999: Elena Antoci (ROM)
- 2000: Maria Cioncan (ROM)
- 2001: Karolina Skourti (GRE)
- 2002: Elena Antoci (ROM)
- 2003: Alina Cucerzan (ROM)
- 2004: Elena Antoci (ROM)
- 2005: Corina Dumbrăvean (ROM)

=== 3000 metres ===
- 1978: Maricica Puică (ROM)
- 1979: Vesela Yatsinska (BUL)
- 1980: Vanya Gospodinova (BUL)
- 1981: Maricica Puică (ROM)
- 1982: Maricica Puică (ROM)
- 1983: Marica Mršić (YUG)
- 1984: Maricica Puică (ROM)
- 1985: Margareta Keszeg (ROM)
- 1986: Nikolina Shtereva (BUL)
- 1988: Viorica Ghican (ROM)
- 1989: Iulia Olteanu (ROM)
- 1990: Suzana Ćirić (YUG)
- 1992: Mariana Chirila (ROM)
- 1994: Milka Mikhailova (BUL)
- 1996: Anila Kasati (ALB)
- 1997: Not held
- 1998: Not held
- 1999: Not held
- 2000: Not held
- 2001: Chrysostomia Iakovou (GRE)
- 2002: Maria Cristina Grosu-Mazilu (ROM)
- 2003: Daniela Petrescu (ROM)
- 2004: Ana Maria Bordea (ROM)
- 2005: Adriana Nelson (ROM)

=== 5000 metres ===
- 1997: Iulia Olteanu (ROM)
- 1998: Olivera Jevtić (YUG)
- 1999: Maria Cristina Grosu-Mazilu (ROM)
- 2000: Cristina Casandra (ROM)
- 2001: Luminiţa Gogîrlea (ROM)
- 2002: Constantina Diță (ROM)
- 2003: Natalia Cercheș (MDA)
- 2004: Ana Maria Bordea (ROM)
- 2005: Adriana Nelson (ROM)

=== 10,000 metres ===
- 1988: Donika Hanxhara (ALB)
- 1989: Iulia Olteanu (ROM)
- 1990: Suzana Ćirić (YUG)
- 1992: Alina Gherasim (ROM)
- 1994: Alina Gherasim (ROM)
- 1996: Olivera Jevtić (YUG)
- 1997: Constantina Diță (ROM)
- 1998: Constantina Diță (ROM)
- 1999: Milka Mikhailova (BUL)
- 2000: Tezeta Sürekli (TUR)

=== Marathon ===
- 1990: Maria Polyzou (GRE)
- 1992: Rumyana Panovska (BUL)
- 1994: Not held
- 1996: Suzana Ćirić (YUG)
- 1997: Panayota Nikolakopoulou (GRE)
- 1998: Gergana Voynova (BUL)
- 1999: Rumyana Panovska (BUL)
- 2000: Cristina Pomacu (ROM)
- 2001: Mehtap Doğan-Sızmaz (TUR)
- 2002: Svetlana Șepelev-Tcaci (MDA)
- 2003: Not held
- 2004: Not held
- 2005: Natalia Cercheș (MDA)
- 2006: Ekaterini Fotopoulou (GRE)

=== 3000 metres steeplechase ===
- 2002: Cristina Casandra (ROM)
- 2003: Cristina Casandra (ROM)
- 2004: Elena Mândrila (ROM)
- 2005: Claudia Colita (ROM)

=== 80 metres hurdles ===
- 1946: Ilona Magyar (YUG)
- 1947: Margareta Lassel (ROM)
- 1953: Not held
- 1954: Not held
- 1955: Not held
- 1956: Not held
- 1957: Milka Babović (YUG)
- 1958: Snezhana Kerkova (BUL)
- 1959: Draga Stamejčič (YUG)
- 1960: Snezhana Kerkova (BUL)
- 1961: Snezhana Kerkova (BUL)
- 1962: Maria Budan (ROM)
- 1963: Snezhana Kerkova (BUL)
- 1964: Draga Stamejčič (YUG)
- 1965: Snezhana Kerkova (BUL)
- 1966: Snezhana Dzhalova (BUL)
- 1967: Valeria Bufanu (ROM)
- 1968: Marijana Lubej (YUG)

=== 100 metres hurdles ===
- 1969: Valeria Bufanu (ROM)
- 1970: Valeria Bufanu (ROM)
- 1971: Valeria Bufanu (ROM)
- 1972: Valeria Bufanu (ROM)
- 1973: Emina Pilav (YUG)
- 1974: Valeria Bufanu (ROM)
- 1975: Viorica Enescu (ROM)
- 1976: Valeria Bufanu (ROM)
- 1977: Lidiya Gusheva (BUL)
- 1978: Lidiya Gusheva (BUL)
- 1979: Daniela Teneva (BUL)
- 1980: Yordanka Donkova (BUL)
- 1981: Nadezhda Asenova (BUL)
- 1982: Mihaela Pogăcean (ROM)
- 1983: Liliana Năstase (ROM)
- 1984: Yordanka Donkova (BUL)
- 1985: Ginka Zagorcheva (BUL)
- 1986: Yordanka Donkova (BUL)
- 1988: Mihaela Pogăcean (ROM)
- 1989: Mihaela Pogăcean (ROM)
- 1990: Voula Patoulidou (GRE)
- 1992: Ginka Zagorcheva (BUL)
- 1994: Erica Niculae (ROM)
- 1996: Liliana Năstase (ROM)
- 1997: Erica Niculae (ROM)
- 1998: Erica Niculae (ROM)
- 1999: Hristiana Tabaki (GRE)
- 2000: Flora Redoumi (GRE)
- 2001: Hristiana Tabaki (GRE)
- 2002: Carmen Zamfir (ROM)
- 2003: Carmen Zamfir (ROM)
- 2004: Carmen Zamfir (ROM)
- 2005: Jelena Jotanović (SCG)

=== 400 metres hurdles ===
- 1978: Yordanka Ivanova (BUL)
- 1979: Bonka Dimova (BUL)
- 1980: Bonka Dimova (BUL)
- 1981: Nadezhda Asenova (BUL)
- 1982: Cristieana Cojocaru (ROM)
- 1983: Cristieana Cojocaru (ROM)
- 1984: Nicoleta Căruțașu (ROM)
- 1985: Cristieana Cojocaru (ROM)
- 1986: Nicoleta Căruțașu (ROM)
- 1988: Nicoleta Căruțașu (ROM)
- 1989: Cristeana Cojocaru (ROM)
- 1990: Nicoleta Căruțașu (ROM)
- 1992: Nicoleta Căruțașu (ROM)
- 1994: Nicoleta Căruțașu (ROM)
- 1996: Ionela Târlea (ROM)
- 1997: Fani Chalkia (GRE)
- 1998: Christina Panagou (GRE)
- 1999: Tsvetelina Kirilova (BUL)
- 2000: Georgia Tsikouri (GRE)
- 2001: Eleni Kalogerou (GRE)
- 2002: Ionela Târlea (ROM)
- 2003: Chrysoula Goudenoudi (GRE)
- 2004: Maria Rus (ROM)
- 2005: Vania Stambolova (BUL)

=== High jump ===
- 1946: Irma Kiss (ROM)
- 1947: Mária Rohonczi (HUN)
- 1957: Iolanda Balaș (ROM)
- 1958: Iolanda Balaș (ROM)
- 1959: Iolanda Balaș (ROM)
- 1960: Iolanda Balaș (ROM)
- 1961: Iolanda Balaș (ROM)
- 1962: Iolanda Balaș (ROM)
- 1963: Iolanda Balaș (ROM)
- 1964: Iolanda Balaș (ROM)
- 1965: Iolanda Balaș (ROM)
- 1966: Olga Gere (YUG)
- 1967: Snežana Hrepevnik (YUG)
- 1968: Virginia Bonci (ROM)
- 1969: Yordanka Blagoeva (BUL)
- 1970: Cornelia Popa (ROM)
- 1971: Cornelia Popa (ROM)
- 1972: Yordanka Blagoeva (BUL)
- 1973: Virginia Bonci (ROM)
- 1974: Herica Teodorescu (ROM)
- 1975: Virginia Bonci (ROM)
- 1976: Yordanka Blagoeva (BUL)
- 1977: Cornelia Popa (ROM)
- 1978: Cornelia Popa (ROM)
- 1979: Cornelia Popa (ROM)
- 1980: Cornelia Popa (ROM)
- 1981: Lyudmila Andonova (BUL)
- 1982: Lidija Benedetič-Lapajne (YUG)
- 1983: Lidija Benedetič-Lapajne (YUG)
- 1984: Lyudmila Andonova (BUL)
- 1985: Stefka Kostadinova (BUL)
- 1986: Stefka Kostadinova (BUL)
- 1988: Biljana Petrović (YUG)
- 1989: Octavia Iacob (ROM)
- 1990: Niki Bakoyianni (GRE)
- 1992: Niki Bakoyianni (GRE)
- 1994: Niki Bakoyianni (GRE)
- 1996: Oana Pantelimon (ROM)
- 1997: Monica Iagăr (ROM)
- 1998: Eleonora Milusheva (BUL)
- 1999: Eleonora Milusheva (BUL)
- 2000: Oana Pantelimon (ROM)
- 2001: Eleonora Milusheva (BUL)
- 2002: Oana Pantelimon (ROM)
- 2003: Venelina Veneva-Mateeva (BUL)
- 2004: Inna Gliznuta (MDA)
- 2005: Inna Gliznuta (MDA)

=== Pole vault ===
- 1997: Tanya Stefanova (BUL)
- 1998: Gabriela Mihalcea (ROM)
- 1999: Tanya Stefanova (BUL)
- 2000: Tanya Stefanova (BUL)
- 2001: Tanya Stefanova (BUL)
- 2002: Tanya Stefanova (BUL)
- 2003: Tanya Stefanova (BUL)
- 2004: Afroditi Skafida (GRE)
- 2005: Dimitra Emmanouil (GRE)

=== Long jump ===
- 1946: Luiza Ernst (ROM)
- 1947: Spomenka Koledin (YUG)
- 1957: Paulina Tolikofer (BUL)
- 1958: Paulina Tolikofer (BUL)
- 1959: Paulina Tolikofer (BUL)
- 1960: Diana Yorgova (BUL)
- 1961: Diana Yorgova (BUL)
- 1962: Diana Yorgova (BUL)
- 1963: Viorica Viscopoleanu (ROM)
- 1964: Viorica Viscopoleanu (ROM)
- 1965: Viorica Viscopoleanu (ROM)
- 1966: Diana Yorgova (BUL)
- 1967: Viorica Viscopoleanu (ROM)
- 1968: Viorica Viscopoleanu (ROM)
- 1969: Viorica Viscopoleanu (ROM)
- 1970: Viorica Viscopoleanu (ROM)
- 1971: Radojka Francoti (YUG)
- 1972: Diana Yorgova (BUL)
- 1973: Viorica Viscopoleanu (ROM)
- 1974: Maria Lambrou (GRE)
- 1975: Alina Gheorghiu (ROM)
- 1976: Elena Vintilă (ROM)
- 1977: Alina Gheorghiu (ROM)
- 1978: Doina Anton (ROM)
- 1979: Maria Lambrou (GRE)
- 1980: Ekaterina Nedeva (BUL)
- 1981: Anișoara Cușmir-Stanciu (ROM)
- 1982: Vali Ionescu (ROM)
- 1983: Snežana Dančetović (YUG)
- 1984: Vali Ionescu (ROM)
- 1985: Silvia Khristova (BUL)
- 1986: Ljudmila Ninova (BUL)
- 1988: Vali Ionescu (ROM)
- 1989: Mirela Dulgheru (ROM)
- 1990: Tamara Malešev (YUG)
- 1992: Mirela Dulgheru (ROM)
- 1994: Voula Patoulidou (GRE)
- 1996: Fatma Dulkan (TUR)
- 1997: Monica Toth (ROM)
- 1998: Christina Athanasiou (GRE)
- 1999: Eva Miklos (ROM)
- 2000: Tereza Marinova (BUL)
- 2001: Antoniya Yordanova (BUL)
- 2002: Antoniya Yordanova (BUL)
- 2003: Despina Papavassilaki (GRE)
- 2004: Adina Anton (ROM)
- 2005: Stiliani Pilatou (GRE)

=== Triple jump ===
- 1992: Sofiya Bozhanova (BUL)
- 1994: Monica Toth (ROM)
- 1996: Tereza Marinova (BUL)
- 1997: Rodica Mateescu (ROM)
- 1998: Cosmina Boaje (ROM)
- 1999: Adelina Gavrilă (ROM)
- 2000: Tereza Marinova (BUL)
- 2001: Adelina Gavrilă (ROM)
- 2002: Mihaela Gindila (ROM)
- 2003: Cristina Nicolau (ROM)
- 2004: Adelina Gavrilă (ROM)
- 2005: Athanasia Perra (GRE)

=== Shot put ===
- 1946: Danica Marinček (YUG)
- 1947: Marija Radosavljević (YUG)
- 1953: Not held
- 1954: Not held
- 1955: Not held
- 1956: Not held
- 1957: Ana Sălăgean (ROM)
- 1958: Ana Sălăgean (ROM)
- 1959: Ana Sălăgean (ROM)
- 1960: Ana Sălăgean (ROM)
- 1961: Ana Sălăgean (ROM)
- 1962: Ana Sălăgean (ROM)
- 1963: Ivanka Khristova (BUL)
- 1964: Ana Sălăgean (ROM)
- 1965: Ana Sălăgean (ROM)
- 1966: Ivanka Khristova (BUL)
- 1967: Ivanka Khristova (BUL)
- 1968: Ivanka Khristova (BUL)
- 1969: Ivanka Khristova (BUL)
- 1970: Ivanka Khristova (BUL)
- 1971: Ivanka Khristova (BUL)
- 1972: Ivanka Khristova (BUL)
- 1973: Ivanka Khristova (BUL)
- 1974: Elena Stoyanova (BUL)
- 1975: Ivanka Khristova (BUL)
- 1976: Elena Stoyanova (BUL)
- 1977: Elena Stoyanova (BUL)
- 1978: Verzhiniya Veselinova (BUL)
- 1979: Ivanka Petrova (BUL)
- 1980: Verzhiniya Veselinova (BUL)
- 1981: Verzhiniya Veselinova (BUL)
- 1982: Mihaela Loghin (ROM)
- 1983: Mihaela Loghin (ROM)
- 1984: Mihaela Loghin (ROM)
- 1985: Mihaela Loghin (ROM)
- 1986: Mihaela Loghin (ROM)
- 1988: Svetla Mitkova-Sınırtaş (BUL)
- 1989: Livia Mehes (ROM)
- 1990: Mihaela Oana (ROM)
- 1992: Mihaela Oana (ROM)
- 1994: Mihaela Oana (ROM)
- 1996: Livia Mehes (ROM)
- 1997: Eleni Tsentemeidou (GRE)
- 1998: Eleni Tsentemeidou (GRE)
- 1999: Elena Hila (ROM)
- 2000: Lucica Ciobanu (ROM)
- 2001: Elena Hila (ROM)
- 2002: Elena Hila (ROM)
- 2003: Irini Terzoglou (GRE)
- 2004: Elena Hila (ROM)
- 2005: Elena Hila (ROM)

=== Discus throw ===
- 1947: Judit Balázs (HUN)
- 1953: Not held
- 1954: Not held
- 1955: Not held
- 1956: Not held
- 1957: Verzhinia Mikhailova (BUL)
- 1958: Lia Manoliu (ROM)
- 1959: Lia Manoliu (ROM)
- 1960: Lia Manoliu (ROM)
- 1961: Olimpia Cataramă (ROM)
- 1962: Lia Manoliu (ROM)
- 1963: Lia Manoliu (ROM)
- 1964: Verzhinia Mikhailova (BUL)
- 1965: Verzhinia Mikhailova (BUL)
- 1966: Verzhinia Mikhailova (BUL)
- 1967: Olimpia Cataramă (ROM)
- 1968: Lia Manoliu (ROM)
- 1969: Lia Manoliu (ROM)
- 1970: Olimpia Cataramă (ROM)
- 1971: Argentina Menis (ROM)
- 1972: Argentina Menis (ROM)
- 1973: Argentina Menis (ROM)
- 1974: Mariya Petkova (BUL)
- 1975: Argentina Menis (ROM)
- 1976: Argentina Menis (ROM)
- 1977: Mariya Petkova (BUL)
- 1978: Donka Khristova (BUL)
- 1979: Florența Crăciunescu (ROM)
- 1980: Mariya Petkova (BUL)
- 1981: Mariya Petkova (BUL)
- 1982: Florența Crăciunescu (ROM)
- 1983: Svetla Bozhkova (BUL)
- 1984: Tsvetanka Khristova (BUL)
- 1985: Florența Crăciunescu (ROM)
- 1986: Tsvetanka Khristova (BUL)
- 1988: Daniela Costian (ROM)
- 1989: Tsvetanka Khristova (BUL)
- 1990: Stefania Simova (BUL)
- 1992: Nicoleta Grasu (ROM)
- 1994: Ekaterini Voggoli (GRE)
- 1996: Danijela Curović (YUG)
- 1997: Nicoleta Grasu (ROM)
- 1998: Nicoleta Grasu (ROM)
- 1999: Nicoleta Grasu (ROM)
- 2000: Styliani Tsikouna (GRE)
- 2001: Areti Abatzi (GRE)
- 2002: Ileana Brîndusoiu (ROM)
- 2003: Styliani Tsikouna (GRE)
- 2004: Areti Abatzi (GRE)
- 2005: Dragana Tomašević (ROM)

=== Hammer throw ===
- 1997: Mihaela Melinte (ROM)
- 1998: Cristina Fechita (ROM)
- 1999: Evdokia Tsamoglou (GRE)
- 2000: Cristina Buzau (ROM)
- 2001: Evdokia Tsamoglou (GRE)
- 2002: Virginia Balut (ROM)
- 2003: Mihaela Melinte (ROM)
- 2004: Mihaela Melinte (ROM)
- 2005: Mihaela Melinte (ROM)

=== Javelin throw ===
- 1947: Mária Rohonczi (HUN)
- 1953: Not held
- 1954: Not held
- 1955: Not held
- 1956: Not held
- 1957: Maria Diaconescu (ROM)
- 1958: Maria Diaconescu (ROM)
- 1959: Maria Diaconescu (ROM)
- 1960: Maria Diaconescu (ROM)
- 1961: Maria Diaconescu (ROM)
- 1962: Marijeta Kačić (YUG)
- 1963: Maria Diaconescu (ROM)
- 1964: Maria Diaconescu (ROM)
- 1965: Mihaela Peneș (ROM)
- 1966: Mihaela Peneș (ROM)
- 1967: Mihaela Peneș (ROM)
- 1968: Mihaela Peneș (ROM)
- 1969: Nataša Urbančič (YUG)
- 1970: Elisabeta Prodan (ROM)
- 1971: Nataša Urbančič (YUG)
- 1972: Lyutviyan Mollova (BUL)
- 1973: Nataša Urbančič (YUG)
- 1974: Lyutviyan Mollova (BUL)
- 1975: Lyutviyan Mollova (BUL)
- 1976: Yordanka Peeva (BUL)
- 1977: Ivanka Vancheva (BUL)
- 1978: Ivanka Vancheva (BUL)
- 1979: Éva Ráduly-Zörgő (ROM)
- 1980: Antoaneta Todorova (BUL)
- 1981: Antoaneta Todorova (BUL)
- 1982: Sofia Sakorafa (GRE)
- 1983: Sofia Sakorafa (GRE)
- 1984: Antoaneta Todorova (BUL)
- 1985: Maria Dzhaleva (BUL)
- 1986: Sofia Sakorafa (GRE)
- 1988: Anna Verouli (GRE)
- 1989: Anna Verouli (GRE)
- 1990: Anna Verouli (GRE)
- 1992: Carla Dumitru (ROM)
- 1994: Mirela Maniani (ALB)
- 1996: Efi Karatopouzi (GRE)
- 1997: Mirela Maniani (GRE)
- 1998: Carmen Filip (ROM)
- 1999: Christina Georgieva (BUL)
- 2000: Ana Mirela Țermure (ROM)
- 2001: Christina Georgieva (BUL)
- 2002: Constanta Iancu (ROM)
- 2003: Rumyana Karapetrova (BUL)
- 2004: Rumyana Karapetrova (BUL)
- 2005: Monica Stoian (ROM)

=== Triathlon ===
- 1947: Melina Sekulici (YUG)

=== Pentathlon ===
- 1957: Draga Stamejčič (YUG)
- 1958: Draga Stamejčič (YUG)
- 1959: Draga Stamejčič (YUG)
- 1960: Aurelia Sîrbu (ROM)
- 1961: Draga Stamejčič (YUG)
- 1962: Draga Stamejčič (YUG)
- 1963: Draga Stamejčič (YUG)
- 1964: Draga Stamejčič (YUG)
- 1965: Sasha Varbanova (BUL)
- 1966: Elena Ventila (ROM)
- 1967: Snezhana Yurukova (BUL)
- 1968: Đurđa Fočić (YUG)
- 1969: Nedyalka Angelova (BUL)
- 1970: Nedyalka Angelova (BUL)
- 1971: Đurđa Fočić (YUG)
- 1972: Nedyalka Angelova (BUL)
- 1973: Đurđa Fočić (YUG)
- 1974: Snezhana Yurukova (BUL)
- 1975: Đurđa Fočić (YUG)
- 1976: Đurđa Fočić (YUG)
- 1977: Valentina Dimitrova (BUL)
- 1978: Breda Babošek (YUG)
- 1979: Valentina Dimitrova (BUL)
- 1980: Valentina Dimitrova (BUL)

=== Heptathlon ===
- 1981: Emilia Pencheva (BUL)
- 1982: Corina Tifrea (ROM)
- 1983: Corina Tifrea (ROM)
- 1984: Corina Tifrea (ROM)
- 1985: Liliana Năstase (ROM)
- 1986: Emilia Dimitrova (BUL)
- 1988: Petra Văideanu (ROM)
- 1989: Alma Qeramixhi (ALB)
- 1990: Alma Qeramixhi (ALB)
- 1992: Yurka Khristova (BUL)
- 1994: Yurka Khristova (BUL)
- 1996: Jelenka Ilić (YUG)
- 1997: Elena Dumitrascu (ROM)
- 1998: Athina Papasotiriou (GRE)
- 1999: Carmen Zamfir (ROM)

=== 10,000 metres walk ===
The Balkan Championships race in 10,000 metres walk was held as a road event in 1988, 1992, and 2000.

- 1988: Kalliopi Gavalaki (GRE)
- 1989: Kalliopi Gavalaki (GRE)
- 1990: Victoria Oprea (ROM)
- 1992: Victoria Lina (ROM)
- 1994: Norica Câmpean (ROM)
- 1996: Norica Câmpean (ROM)
- 1997: Norica Câmpean (ROM)
- 1998: Elena Isar (ROM)
- 1999: Norica Câmpean (ROM)
- 2000: Daniela Cârlan (ROM)

=== 20 kilometres walk ===
- 2001: Ana Maria Groza (ROM)
- 2002: Nevena Mineva-Dimitrova (BUL)
- 2003: Veronica Budileanu (ROM)
- 2004: Athina Papayianni (GRE)
- 2005: Evangelia Xinou (GRE)
- 2006: Ana Maria Groza (ROM)

=== 4 × 100 metres relay ===
- 1947: Hungary (HUN)
- 1953: Not held
- 1954: Not held
- 1955: Not held
- 1956: Not held
- 1957: Romania (ROM)
- 1958: Romania (ROM)
- 1959: Yugoslavia (YUG)
- 1960: Yugoslavia (YUG)
- 1961: Bulgaria (BUL)
- 1962: Yugoslavia (YUG)
- 1963: Bulgaria (BUL)
- 1964: Yugoslavia (YUG)
- 1965: Yugoslavia (YUG)
- 1966: Bulgaria (BUL)
- 1967: Yugoslavia (YUG)
- 1968: Yugoslavia (YUG)
- 1969: Romania (ROM)
- 1970: Bulgaria (BUL)
- 1971: Romania (ROM)
- 1972: Bulgaria (BUL)
- 1973: Yugoslavia (YUG)
- 1974: Yugoslavia (YUG)
- 1975: Bulgaria (BUL)
- 1976: Bulgaria (BUL)
- 1977: Bulgaria (BUL)
- 1978: Yugoslavia (YUG)
- 1979: Bulgaria (BUL)
- 1980: Bulgaria (BUL)
- 1981: Bulgaria (BUL)
- 1982: Romania (ROM)
- 1983: Bulgaria (BUL)
- 1984: Bulgaria (BUL)
- 1985: Bulgaria (BUL)
- 1986: Bulgaria (BUL)
- 1988: Bulgaria (BUL)
- 1989: Bulgaria (BUL)
- 1990: Romania (ROM)
- 1992: Bulgaria (BUL)
- 1994: Greece (GRE)
- 1996: Romania (ROM)
- 1997: Romania (ROM)
- 1998: Romania (ROM)
- 1999: Romania (ROM)
- 2000: Greece (GRE)
- 2001: Greece (GRE)
- 2002: Bulgaria (BUL)
- 2003: Greece (GRE)
- 2004: Greece (GRE)
- 2005: Greece (GRE)

=== 4 × 400 metres relay ===
- 1969: Yugoslavia (YUG)
- 1970: Romania (ROM)
- 1971: Romania (ROM)
- 1972: Bulgaria (BUL)
- 1973: Bulgaria (BUL)
- 1974: Romania (ROM)
- 1975: Romania (ROM)
- 1976: Romania (ROM)
- 1977: Romania (ROM)
- 1978: Romania (ROM)
- 1979: Bulgaria (BUL)
- 1980: Bulgaria (BUL)
- 1981: Romania (ROM)
- 1982: Romania (ROM)
- 1983: Romania (ROM)
- 1984: Romania (ROM)
- 1985: Bulgaria (BUL)
- 1986: Bulgaria (BUL)
- 1988: Bulgaria (BUL)
- 1989: Romania (ROM)
- 1990: Bulgaria (BUL)
- 1992: Romania (ROM)
- 1994: Romania (ROM)
- 1996: Romania (ROM)
- 1997: Yugoslavia (YUG)
- 1998: Yugoslavia (YUG)
- 1999: Romania (ROM)
- 2000: Romania (ROM)
- 2001: Bulgaria (BUL)
- 2002: Romania (ROM)
- 2003: Bulgaria (BUL)
- 2004: Romania (ROM)
- 2005: Bulgaria (BUL)
