= 1979 European Athletics Indoor Championships – Women's 800 metres =

The women's 800 metres event at the 1979 European Athletics Indoor Championships was held on 25 February in Vienna.

== Results ==
| Rank | Name | Nationality | Time | Notes |
|---|---|---|---|---|
| 1st place, gold medalist(s) | Nikolina Shtereva | Bulgaria | 2:02.6 | SB |
| 2nd place, silver medalist(s) | Anita Weiß | East Germany | 2:02.9 | PB |
| 3rd place, bronze medalist(s) | Fița Lovin | Romania | 2:03.1 | SB |
| 4 | Elisabeth Schacht | West Germany | 2:03.7 | PB |
| 5 | Anne-Marie Van Nuffel | Belgium | 2:05.3 | SB |
| 6 | Violeta Tsvetkova | Bulgaria | 2:05.4 | SB |
| 7 | Ivanka Bonova | Bulgaria | 2:05.9 | SB |
