= 1981 in the sport of athletics =

1981 in athletics
- Major world events: N/A

This article contains an overview of the year 1981 in athletics.

== International events ==
- Asian Championships
- Central American and Caribbean Championships
- European Indoor Championships
- South American Championships
- Universiade
- World Cross Country Championships

== Men's Best Year Performers ==
=== 100 metres ===
RANK	1981 WORLD BEST PERFORMERS	TIME
1.	Carl Lewis (USA)	10.00
2.	Mel Lattany (USA)	10.04
3.	James Sanford (USA)	10.05
4.	Stanley Floyd (USA)	10.10
5.	Jeff Phillips (USA)	10.11

=== 200 metres ===
RANK	1981 WORLD BEST PERFORMERS	TIME
1.	James Sanford (USA)	20.20
2.	Mel Lattany (USA)	20.21
3.	Allan Wells (GBR)	20.26
4.	Frank Emmelmann (GDR)	20.33
5.	Dwayne Evans (USA)	20.34

=== 400 metres ===
RANK	1981 WORLD BEST PERFORMERS	TIME
1.	Bert Cameron (JAM)	44.58
2.	Cliff Wiley (USA)	44.70
3.	Zeke Jefferson (USA)	44.86
4.	Leslie Kerr (USA)	44.90
5.	Howard Henley (USA)	44.92

=== 800 metres ===
RANK	1981 WORLD BEST PERFORMERS	TIME
1.	Sebastian Coe (GBR)	1:41.73
2.	Joaquim Cruz (BRA)	1:44.3
3.	Olaf Beyer (GDR)	1:44.31
4.	Mike Boit (KEN)	1:44.49
5.	James Robinson (USA)	1:44.63

=== 1,500 metres ===
RANK	1981 WORLD BEST PERFORMERS	TIME
1.	Steve Ovett (GBR)	3:31.57
2.	Sebastian Coe (GBR)	3:31.95
3.	Steve Scott (USA)	3:31.96
4.	Sydney Maree (USA)	3:32.30
5.	Thomas Wessinghage (FRG)	3:33.49

=== Mile ===
RANK	1981 WORLD BEST PERFORMERS	TIME
1.	Sebastian Coe (GBR)	3:47.33
2.	Steve Ovett (GBR)	3:48.40
3.	Sydney Maree (USA)	3:48.83
4.	Mike Boit (KEN)	3:49.45
5.	José Luis González (ESP)	3:49.67

=== 3,000 metres ===
RANK	1981 WORLD BEST PERFORMERS	TIME
1.	Steve Scott (USA)	7:36.69
2.	Thomas Wessinghage (FRG)	7:36.75
3.	Henry Rono (KEN)	7:41.41
4.	Sydney Maree (USA)	7:43.42
5.	Eamonn Coghlan (IRL)	7:44.99

=== 5,000 metres ===
RANK	1981 WORLD BEST PERFORMERS	TIME
1.	Henry Rono (KEN)	13:06.20
2.	Hansjörg Kunze (GDR)	13:10.40
3.	Valeriy Abramov (URS)	13:11.99
4.	Thomas Wessinghage (FRG)	13:13.47
5.	Julian Goater (GBR)	13:15.59

=== 10,000 metres ===
RANK	1981 WORLD BEST PERFORMERS	TIME
1.	Fernando Mamede (POR)	27:27.7
2.	Werner Schildhauer (GDR)	27:38.43
3.	Mohamed Kedir (ETH)	27:39.44
4.	Alberto Salazar (USA)	27:40.69
5.	Henry Rono (KEN)	27:40.78

=== Half Marathon ===
RANK	1981 WORLD BEST PERFORMERS	TIME
1.	Herb Lindsay (USA)	1:01:47

=== 110m Hurdles ===
RANK	1981 WORLD BEST PERFORMERS	TIME
1.	Renaldo Nehemiah (USA)	12.93
2.	Greg Foster (USA)	13.03
3.	Alejandro Casañas (CUB)	13.36
4.	Sam Turner (USA)	13.38
5.	Dedy Cooper (USA)	13.40

=== 400m Hurdles ===
RANK	1981 WORLD BEST PERFORMERS	TIME
1.	Edwin Moses (USA)	47.14
2.	Andre Phillips (USA)	48.10
3.	David Lee (USA)	48.53
4.	Harald Schmid (FRG)	48.64
5.	Bart Williams (USA)	48.81

=== 3,000m Steeplechase ===
RANK	1981 WORLD BEST PERFORMERS	TIME
1.	Patriz Ilg (FRG)	8:12.13
2.	Mariano Scartezzini (ITA)	8:13.32
3.	Bogusław Mamiński (POL)	8:16.66
4.	Amos Korir (KEN)	8:18.57
5.	Henry Marsh (USA)	8:18.58

=== High Jump ===
RANK	1981 WORLD BEST PERFORMERS	HEIGHT
1.	Jeff Woodard (USA)	2.33
1.	Aleksey Demyanyuk (URS)	2.33
3.	Roland Dalhäuser (SUI)	2.31
3.	Gerd Nagel (FRG)	2.31
3.	Dwight Stones (USA)	2.31

=== Long Jump ===
RANK	1981 WORLD BEST PERFORMERS	DISTANCE
1.	Carl Lewis (USA)	8.62
2.	Larry Myricks (USA)	8.45
3.	Henry Lauterbach (GDR)	8.35
4.	Winfried Klepsch (FRG)	8.21
5.	Atanas Chochev (BUL)	8.19

=== Triple Jump ===
RANK	1981 WORLD BEST PERFORMERS	DISTANCE
1.	Willie Banks (USA)	17.56
2.	João Carlos de Oliveira (BRA)	17.37
3.	Zou Zhenxian (CHN)	17.34
4.	Keith Connor (GBR)	17.31
5.	Shamil Abbyasov (URS)	17.30

=== Discus ===
RANK	1981 WORLD BEST PERFORMERS	DISTANCE
1.	John Powell (USA)	69.98
2.	Wolfgang Schmidt (GDR)	69.60
3.	Al Oerter (USA)	68.76
4.	Art Swarts (USA)	68.32
5.	Art Burns (USA)	67.86

=== Hammer ===
RANK	1981 WORLD BEST PERFORMERS	DISTANCE
1.	Klaus Ploghaus (FRG)	80.56
2.	Yuriy Syedikh (URS)	80.18
3.	Sergey Litvinov (URS)	79.60
4.	Roland Steuk (GDR)	78.72
5.	Karl-Hans Riehm (FRG)	78.72

=== Shot Put ===
RANK	1981 WORLD BEST PERFORMERS	DISTANCE
1.	Brian Oldfield (USA)	22.02
2.	Udo Beyer (GDR)	21.69
3.	Dave Laut (USA)	21.60
4.	Mike Carter (USA)	21.20
5.	Yevgeniy Mironov (URS)	21.11

=== Pole Vault ===
RANK	1981 WORLD BEST PERFORMERS	HEIGHT
1.	Vladimir Polyakov (URS)	5.81
1.	Thierry Vigneron (FRA)	5.81
3.	Konstantin Volkov (URS)	5.75
4.	Philippe Houvion (FRA)	5.70
4.	Jean-Michel Bellot (FRA)	5.70
4.	Sergey Kulibaba (URS)	5.70
4.	Aleksandr Krupskiy (URS)	5.70

=== Javelin (old design) ===
RANK	1981 WORLD BEST PERFORMERS	DISTANCE
1.	Detlef Michel (GDR)	92.48
2.	Pentti Sinersaari (FIN)	91.98
3.	Arto Härkönen (FIN)	91.04
4.	Dainis Kula (URS)	90.54
5.	Seppo Hovinen (FIN)	90.38

=== Decathlon ===
RANK	1981 WORLD BEST PERFORMERS	POINTS
1.	Rainer Pottel (GDR)	8334
2.	Yuriy Kutsenko (URS)	8281
3.	Uwe Freimuth (GDR)	8221
4.	Dariusz Ludwig (POL)	8204
5.	Atanas Andonov (BUL)	8220

== Women's Best Year Performers ==
=== 100 metres ===
RANK	1981 WORLD BEST PERFORMERS	TIME
1.	Evelyn Ashford (USA)	10.90
2.	Merlene Ottey (JAM)	11.07
3.	Jarmila Kratochvílová (TCH)	11.09
3.	Marlies Göhr (GDR)	11.09
5.	Angella Taylor (CAN)	11.12

=== 200 metres ===
RANK	1981 WORLD BEST PERFORMERS	TIME
1.	Evelyn Ashford (USA)	21.84
2.	Jarmila Kratochvílová (TCH)	21.97
3.	Bärbel Wöckel (GDR)	22.07
4.	Merlene Ottey (JAM)	22.35
5.	Gesine Walther (GDR)	22.42

=== 400 metres ===
RANK	1981 WORLD BEST PERFORMERS	TIME
1.	Jarmila Kratochvílová (TCH)	48.61
2.	Marita Koch (GDR)	49.27
3.	Irina Nazarova (RUS)	50.50
4.	Gaby Bussmann (FRG)	50.83
5.	Dagmar Rübsam (GDR)	50.98

=== 800 metres ===
RANK	1981 WORLD BEST PERFORMERS	TIME
1.	Lyudmila Veselkova (URS)	1:56.98
2.	Martina Steuk (GDR)	1:57.16
3.	Fiţa Lovin (ROU)	1:57.42
4.	Tamara Sorokina (URS)	1:57.55
5.	Hildegard Körner (GDR)	1:57.56

=== 1,500 metres ===
RANK	1981 WORLD BEST PERFORMERS	TIME
1.	Olga Dvirna (URS)	3:57.78
2.	Maricica Puică (ROU)	3:58.29
3.	Zamira Zaytseva (URS)	3:58.70
4.	Tamara Sorokina (URS)	3:58.89
5.	Anna Bukis (POL)	3:59.67

=== Mile ===
RANK	1981 WORLD BEST PERFORMERS	TIME
1.	Lyudmila Veselkova (URS)	4:20.89
2.	Maricica Puică (ROU)	4:21.40
3.	Fiţa Lovin (ROU)	4:21.82
4.	Zamira Zaytseva (URS)	4:22.5
5.	Svetlana Ulmasova (URS)	4:23.8

=== 3,000 metres ===
RANK	1981 WORLD BEST PERFORMERS	TIME
1.	Maricica Puică (ROU)	8:34.30
2.	Tatyana Pozdnyakova (URS)	8:34.80
3.	Alla Yushina (URS)	8:38.34
4.	Olga Dvirna (URS)	8:44.6
5.	Grete Waitz (NOR)	8:44.64

=== 5,000 metres ===
RANK	1981 WORLD BEST PERFORMERS	TIME
1.	Paula Fudge (GBR)	15:14.51
2.	Yelena Sipatova (URS)	15:24.6
3.	Ellen Tittel (FRG)	15:34.76

=== 10,000 metres ===
RANK	1981 WORLD BEST PERFORMERS	TIME
1.	Yelena Sipatova (URS)	32:17.19
2.	Yelena Tsukhlo (URS)	32:20.40
3.	Anna Oyun (URS)	32:36.00
4.	Maria Klyukina (URS)	32:37.40
5.	Marina Danilyuk (URS)	32:46.56

=== 100m Hurdles ===
RANK	1981 WORLD BEST PERFORMERS	TIME
1.	Tatyana Anisimova (URS)	12.68
2.	Kerstin Knabe (GDR)	12.85
3.	Danuta Perka (POL)	12.93
4,	Lucyna Kalek (POL)	12.97

=== 400m Hurdles ===
RANK	1981 WORLD BEST PERFORMERS	TIME
1.	Ellen Neumann (GDR)	54.79
2.	Natalya Tsyruk (URS)	55.49
3.	Ana Kasteckaja (URS)	55.51
4.	Petra Pfaff (GDR)	55.54
5.	Genowefa Blaszak (POL)	55.78

=== High Jump ===
RANK	1981 WORLD BEST PERFORMERS	HEIGHT
1.	Pam Spencer (USA)	1.97 m
2.	Charmaine Gale (RSA)	1.96 m
2.	Kerstin Dedner (GDR)	1.96 m
2.	Sara Simeoni (ITA)	1.96 m
2.	Ulrike Meyfarth (FRG)	1.96 m
2.	Tamara Bykova (URS)	1.96 m

=== Long Jump ===
RANK	1981 WORLD BEST PERFORMERS	DISTANCE
1.	Jodi Anderson (USA)	6.96 m
2.	Anişoara Cuşmir (ROU)	6.91 m
2.	Heike Daute (GDR)	6.91 m
4.	Ramona Neubert (GDR)	6.90 m
5.	Sigrid Ulbricht (GDR)	6.89 m

=== Discus ===
RANK	1981 WORLD BEST PERFORMERS	DISTANCE
1.	Evelin Jahl (GDR)	71.46 m
2.	Mariya Petkova (BUL)	71.30 m
3.	Valentina Kharchenko (URS)	69.86 m
4.	Galina Savinkova (URS)	69.70 m
5.	Florenţa Crăciunescu (ROU)	68.98 m

=== Shot Put ===
RANK	1981 WORLD BEST PERFORMERS	DISTANCE
1.	Ilona Slupianek (GDR)	21.61 m
2.	Helena Fibingerová (TCH)	21.57 m
3.	Ines Müller (GDR)	21.14 m
4.	Verzhinia Veselinova (BUL)	21.09 m
5.	Margitta Droese (GDR)	21.08 m

=== Javelin (old design) ===
RANK	1981 WORLD BEST PERFORMERS	DISTANCE
1.	Antoaneta Todorova (BUL)	71.88 m
2.	Tessa Sanderson (GBR)	68.86 m
3.	Ute Hommola (GDR)	67.24 m
4.	Petra Felke (GDR)	66.60 m
5.	Tiina Lillak (FIN)	66.34 m

=== Heptathlon ===
RANK	1981 WORLD BEST PERFORMERS	POINTS
1.	Ramona Neubert (GDR)	6788
2.	Sabine Everts (FRG)	6365
3.	Malgorzata Nowak (POL)	6333
4.	Yekaterina Gordiyenko (URS)	6295
5.	Jane Frederick (USA)	6291

== Births ==
=== January ===
- January 8 – Mesías Zapata, Ecuadorian race walker
- January 14 – Hyleas Fountain, American heptathlete
- January 18 – Naoyuki Daigo, Japanese high jumper
- January 24 – Jong Yong-Ok, North Korean long-distance runner
- January 27 – Fabrizio Schembri, Italian triple jumper
- January 29 – Rose Richmond, American long jumper

=== February ===
- February 12 – Amarilys Alméstica, Puerto Rican hammer thrower
- February 13 – Rosibel García, Colombian middle-distance runner
- February 15 – Rita Jeptoo, Kenyan marathon runner
- February 16 – Jessé de Lima, Brazilian high jumper
- February 17 – Shi Na, Chinese race walker
- February 19 – Shellene Williams, Jamaican sprinter
- February 25 – Marek Plawgo, Polish athlete

=== March ===
- March 11 – Yelena Konevtseva, Russian hammer thrower
- March 13 – Stefan Wenk, German javelin thrower
- March 22 – Aliaksandr Parkhomenka, Belarusian decathlete
- March 28 – Yuniel Hernández, Cuban hurdler

=== April ===
- April 13 – Moushaumi Robinson, American sprinter
- April 19 – Kazuhiro Maeda, Japanese long-distance runner

=== May ===
- May 6 – Rui Pedro Silva, Portuguese distance runner
- May 15 – Merja Korpela, Finnish hammer thrower
- May 20 – Jana Tucholke, German discus thrower
- May 21 – Anna Rogowska, Polish pole vaulter
- May 28 – Kamil Kalka, Polish race walker
- May 31 – Eileen O'Keefe, Irish hammer thrower

=== July ===
- July 9 – Rutger Smith, Dutch discus thrower and shot putter
- July 13 – Ineta Radēviča, Latvian long and triple jumper
- July 24 – Carys Parry, Welsh hammer thrower
- July 30 – Daria Onyśko, Polish sprinter

=== August ===
- August 15 – Yoshiko Fujinaga, Japanese long-distance runner
- August 30 – Aleksandr Vashchyla, Belarusian hammer thrower

=== September ===
- September 6 – Brandon Simpson, Jamaican athlete
- September 7 – Eyerusalem Kuma, Ethiopian distance runner
- September 12 – Greg Nixon, American sprinter
- September 15 – Tomas Intas, Lithuanian javelin thrower

=== October ===
- October 3 – Anna Omarova, Russian shot putter
- October 18 – Ji Young-Jun, South Korean long-distance runner

=== November ===
- November 8 – Jéssica Augusto, Portuguese long-distance runner
- November 18 – Kimberly Barrett, Jamaica-Puerto Rican shot putter
- November 21 – Werknesh Kidane, Ethiopian long-distance runner

=== December ===
- December 8 – Gabriel Ortiz, Mexican race walker
- December 22 – Marina Kuptsova, Russian high jumper

== Deaths ==
- April 25 – Paul Bontemps (76), French long-distance runner (b. 1902)
- August 2 – Delfo Cabrera (62), Argentine long-distance runner (b. 1919)
