= 1978 European Athletics Indoor Championships – Women's 800 metres =

The women's 800 metres event at the 1978 European Athletics Indoor Championships was held on 11 and 12 March in Milan.

== Medalists ==
| Gold | Silver | Bronze |
|---|---|---|
| Ulrike Bruns; East Germany | Totka Petrova; Bulgaria | Mariana Suman; Romania |

== Results ==
=== Heats ===
First 2 from each heat (Q) qualified directly for the final.

| Rank | Heat | Name | Nationality | Time | Notes |
|---|---|---|---|---|---|
| 1 | 3 | Totka Petrova | Bulgaria | 2:01.5 | Q |
| 2 | 3 | Mariana Suman | Romania | 2:01.6 | Q |
| 3 | 3 | Tatyana Providokhina | Soviet Union | 2:02.4 | |
| 4 | 2 | Heike Roock | East Germany | 2:02.9 | Q |
| 5 | 3 | Marie-Françoise Dubois | France | 2:03.0 | |
| 6 | 2 | Anne-Marie Van Nuffel | Belgium | 2:03.1 | Q |
| 7 | 2 | Elżbieta Katolik | Poland | 2:03.4 | |
| 8 | 1 | Ulrike Bruns | East Germany | 2:04.3 | Q |
| 8 | 1 | Verona Elder | Great Britain | 2:04.3 | Q |
| 8 | 2 | Elena Tărîță | Romania | 2:04.3 | |
| 11 | 3 | Silvana Cruciata | Italy | 2:04.7 | |
| 12 | 1 | Chantal Aubry | France | 2:05.9 | |
| 13 | 1 | Gabriella Dorio | Italy | 2:06.0 | |
| 14 | 2 | Galina Atanasova | Bulgaria | 2:06.7 | |
| 15 | 1 | Lilja Guðmundsdóttir | Iceland | 2:11.6 | |

=== Final ===
| Rank | Name | Nationality | Time | Notes |
|---|---|---|---|---|
| 1st place, gold medalist(s) | Ulrike Bruns | East Germany | 2:02.3 | |
| 2nd place, silver medalist(s) | Totka Petrova | Bulgaria | 2:02.5 | |
| 3rd place, bronze medalist(s) | Mariana Suman | Romania | 2:03.4 | |
| 4 | Anne-Marie Van Nuffel | Belgium | 2:03.8 | |
| 5 | Heike Roock | East Germany | 2:03.8 | |
| 6 | Verona Elder | Great Britain | 2:09.2 | |
