= 1974 European Athletics Championships – Women's 800 metres =

Women's 800 metres at the European Athletics Championships

The women's 800 metres at the 1974 European Athletics Championships was held in Rome, Italy, at Stadio Olimpico on 2, 3, and 4 September 1974.

== Medalists ==
Gold	Lilyana Todorova; Bulgaria
Silver	Gunhild Hoffmeister; East Germany
Bronze	Mariana Suman; Romania

== Results ==
=== Final ===
4 September

Rank	Name	Nationality	Time	Notes
1st place, gold medalist(s)	Lilyana Todorova	Bulgaria	1:58.14	CR
2nd place, silver medalist(s)	Gunhild Hoffmeister	East Germany	1:58.81	NR
3rd place, bronze medalist(s)	Mariana Suman	Romania	1:59.84	
4	Marie-Françoise Dubois	France	1:59.94	NR
5	Valentina Gerasimova	Soviet Union	2:00.10	
6	Nina Morgunova	Soviet Union	2:00.76	
7	Elżbieta Katolik	Poland	2:01.37	
8	Gisela Ellenberger	West Germany	2:01.48	

=== Semi-finals ===
3 September

==== Semi-final 1 ====
Rank	Name	Nationality	Time	Notes
1	Mariana Suman	Romania	2:00.2	Q
2	Marie-Françoise Dubois	France	2:00.3	NR Q
3	Valentina Gerasimova	Soviet Union	2:00.8	Q
4	Gisela Ellenberger	West Germany	2:01.5	Q
5	Waltraud Pöhland	East Germany	2:01.9	
6	Mary Purcell	Ireland	2:04.0	
7	Nikolina Shtereva	Bulgaria	2:04.1	
8	Rosemary Wright	Great Britain	2:04.9	

==== Semi-final 2 ====
Rank	Name	Nationality	Time	Notes
1	Gunhild Hoffmeister	East Germany	2:03.0	Q
2	Elżbieta Katolik	Poland	2:03.1	Q
3	Lilyana Todorova	Bulgaria	2:03.3	Q
4	Nina Morgunova	Soviet Union	2:03.6	Q
5	Anne-Marie Van Nuffel	Belgium	2:04.1	
6	Lesley Kiernan	Great Britain	2:05.4	
	Nijolė Sabaitė	Soviet Union	DNS	
	Gunilla Lindh	Sweden	DNS	

=== Heats ===
2 September

==== Heat 1 ====
Rank	Name	Nationality	Time	Notes
1	Marie-Françoise Dubois	France	2:01.2	Q
2	Elżbieta Katolik	Poland	2:01.4	Q
3	Mariana Suman	Romania	2:01.5	Q
4	Nina Morgunova	Soviet Union	2:01.7	Q
5	Mary Purcell	Ireland	2:02.8	q
6	Birgitte Jennes	Denmark	2:09.2	
	Uschi Meyer	Switzerland	DNS	

==== Heat 2 ====
Rank	Name	Nationality	Time	Notes
1	Gunhild Hoffmeister	East Germany	2:02.6	Q
2	Gisela Ellenberger	West Germany	2:02.7	Q
3	Nijolė Sabaitė	Soviet Union	2:02.9	Q
4	Nikolina Shtereva	Bulgaria	2:03.2	Q
5	Anne-Marie Van Nuffel	Belgium	2:03.6	q
6	Rosemary Wright	Great Britain	2:03.9	q
	Neşe Çetin	Turkey	DNS	

==== Heat 3 ====
Rank	Name	Nationality	Time	Notes
1	Lilyana Todorova	Bulgaria	2:02.1	Q
2	Valentina Gerasimova	Soviet Union	2:02.2	Q
3	Waltraud Pöhland	East Germany	2:02.3	Q
4	Gunilla Lindh	Sweden	2:02.3	NR Q
5	Lesley Kiernan	Great Britain	2:02.8	q
6	Jolanta Januchta	Poland	2:04.7	
	Gabriella Dorio	Italy	DNS	

== Participation ==
According to an unofficial count, 18 athletes from 12 countries participated in the event.

- Belgium (1)
- Bulgaria (2)
- Denmark (1)
- East Germany (2)
- France (1)
- Ireland (1)
- Poland (2)
- Romania (1)
- Soviet Union (3)
- Sweden (1)
- Great Britain (2)
- West Germany (1)
