= 1977 European Athletics Indoor Championships – Women's 800 metres =

The women's 800 metres event at the 1977 European Athletics Indoor Championships was held on 12 and 13 March in San Sebastián.

== Medalists ==
| Gold | Silver | Bronze |
|---|---|---|
| Jane Colebrook; Great Britain | Totka Petrova; Bulgaria | Elżbieta Katolik; Poland |

== Results ==
=== Heats ===
First 2 from each heat (Q) and the next 2 fastest (q) qualified for the final.

| Rank | Heat | Name | Nationality | Time | Notes |
|---|---|---|---|---|---|
| 1 | 1 | Totka Petrova | Bulgaria | 2:02.6 | Q |
| 2 | 1 | Elżbieta Katolik | Poland | 2:02.9 | Q |
| 3 | 1 | Jane Colebrook | Great Britain | 2:03.2 | q |
| 4 | 1 | Brigitte Koczelnik | West Germany | 2:03.8 | q |
| 5 | 2 | Svetlana Styrkina | Soviet Union | 2:04.0 | Q |
| 6 | 2 | Svetla Koleva | Bulgaria | 2:04.2 | Q |
| 7 | 2 | Gisela Klein | West Germany | 2:04.4 | |
| 8 | 1 | Anne-Marie Van Nuffel | Belgium | 2:05.0 | |
| 9 | 1 | Chantal Aubry | France | 2:06.1 | |
| 10 | 2 | Irén Lipcsei | Hungary | 2:06.5 | |
| 11 | 2 | Colette Besson | France | 2:06.9 | |

=== Final ===
| Rank | Name | Nationality | Time | Notes |
|---|---|---|---|---|
| 1st place, gold medalist(s) | Jane Colebrook | Great Britain | 2:01.12 | WR, CR |
| 2nd place, silver medalist(s) | Totka Petrova | Bulgaria | 2:01.17 | |
| 3rd place, bronze medalist(s) | Elżbieta Katolik | Poland | 2:01.3 | |
| 4 | Svetlana Styrkina | Soviet Union | 2:01.4 | |
| 5 | Svetla Koleva | Bulgaria | 2:02.2 | |
| 6 | Brigitte Koczelnik | West Germany | 2:05.6 | |
