= Athletics at the 1980 Summer Olympics – Women's 800 metres =

Women's 800 metres at the Games of the XXII Olympiad
- Venue: Lenin Central Stadium
- Date: 24 July 1980 (heats); 25 July 1980 (semi-final); 27 July 1980 (final)
- Competitors: 29 from 16 nations
- Winning time: 1:53.5 WR

Medalists
1st place, gold medalist(s)		Nadezhda Olizarenko; Soviet Union
2nd place, silver medalist(s)		Olga Mineyeva; Soviet Union
3rd place, bronze medalist(s)		Tatyana Providokhina; Soviet Union

These are the official results of the women's 800 metres event at the 1980 Summer Olympics in Moscow, Soviet Union. The competition was held on July 24, 1980, and on July 27, 1980.

== Final ==
- Held on Sunday July 27, 1980

Rank	Athlete	Nation	Time	Notes
1st place, gold medalist(s)	Nadezhda Olizarenko	Soviet Union	1:53.5 WR	
2nd place, silver medalist(s)	Olga Mineyeva	Soviet Union	1:54.9	
3rd place, bronze medalist(s)	Tatyana Providokhina	Soviet Union	1:55.5	
4	Martina Kämpfert	East Germany	1:56.3	
5	Hildegard Ullrich	East Germany	1:57.2	
6	Jolanta Januchta	Poland	1:58.3	
7	Nikolina Shtereva	Bulgaria	1:58.8	
8	Gabriella Dorio	Italy	1:59.2	

== Semifinals ==
- Held on Friday July 25, 1980

Rank	Athlete	Nation	Time	Notes
1	Olga Mineyeva	Soviet Union	1:57.5	
2	Martina Kämpfert	East Germany	1:58.1	
3	Tatyana Providokhina	Soviet Union	1:58.3	
4	Nikolina Shtereva	Bulgaria	1:58.9	
5	Gabriella Dorio	Italy	1:59.0	
6	Doina Melinte	Romania	2:00.8	
7	Elżbieta Skowrońska-Katolik	Poland	2:01.1	
8	Anne-Marie Van Nuffel	Belgium	2:02.0	

Rank	Athlete	Nation	Time	Notes
1	Nadezhda Olizarenko	Soviet Union	1:57.7	
2	Hildegard Ullrich	East Germany	1:58.7	
3	Jolanta Januchta	Poland	1:58.9	
4	Fiţa Lovin	Romania	1:59.2	
5	Vesela Yatsinska	Bulgaria	1:59.9	
6	Totka Petrova	Bulgaria	2:00.0	
7	Anna Bukis	Poland	2:00.3	
8	Christina Boxer	Great Britain	2:00.9	

== Heats ==
- Held on Thursday July 24, 1980

Rank	Athlete	Nation	Time	Notes
1	Gabriella Dorio	Italy	2:01.4	
2	Olga Mineyeva	Soviet Union	2:01.5	
3	Doina Melinte	Romania	2:01.9	
4	Christina Boxer	Great Britain	2:02.1	
5	Mwinga Mwanjala	Tanzania	2:05.2	
6	Geeta Zutshi	India	2:06.6	
7	Fantaye Sirak	Ethiopia	2:08.7	

Rank	Athlete	Nation	Time	Notes
1	Nadezhda Olizarenko	Soviet Union	1:59.3	
2	Jolanta Januchta	Poland	1:59.7	
3	Vesela Yatsinska	Bulgaria	1:59.9	
4	Anne-Marie Van Nuffel	Belgium	2:00.1	
5	Daniela Porcelli	Italy	2:10.7	
6	Albertine Rahéliarisoa	Madagascar	2:11.7	
7	Margaret Morel	Seychelles	2:17.0	

Rank	Athlete	Nation	Time	Notes
1	Tatyana Providokhina	Soviet Union	1:58.5	
2	Martina Kämpfert	East Germany	1:58.8	
3	Nikolina Shtereva	Bulgaria	1:58.9	
4	Anna Bukis	Poland	1:58.9	
5	Agnese Possamai	Italy	2:04.1	
6	Fatalmoudou Touré	Mali	2:19.8	

Rank	Athlete	Nation	Time	Notes
1	Hildegard Ullrich	East Germany	2:00.1	
2	Fiţa Lovin	Romania	2:00.2	
3	Totka Petrova	Bulgaria	2:00.6	
4	Elżbieta Skowrońska-Katolik	Poland	2:01.2	
5	Lilian Nyiti	Tanzania	2:11.1	
6	Hala El-Moughrabi	Syria	2:17.6	
7	Acacia Mate	Mozambique	2:19.7	
8	Eugenia Osho-Williams	Sierra Leone	2:33.4	
