= Athletics at the 1977 Summer Universiade – Women's 800 metres =

The women's 800 metres event at the 1977 Summer Universiade was held at the Vasil Levski National Stadium in Sofia on 20 and 21 August.

== Medalists ==
Gold	Silver	Bronze
Totka Petrova; Bulgaria	Tatyana Kazankina; Soviet Union	Svetla Koleva; Bulgaria

== Results ==
=== Heats ===
Rank	Heat	Athlete	Nationality	Time	Notes
1	2	Totka Petrova	Bulgaria	2:01.5	Q
2	3	Tatyana Kazankina	Soviet Union	2:01.7	Q
3	3	Fița Lovin	Romania	2:01.7	Q
4	1	Svetla Koleva	Bulgaria	2:01.9	Q
5	1	Elena Tărîță	Romania	2:02.1	Q
6	1	Jolanta Januchta	Poland	2:02.1	q
7	2	Lore Laugnammer	East Germany	2:02.2	Q
8	3	Christiane Stoll	East Germany	2:02.8	q
9	3	Julie Brown	United States	2:02.8	
10	1	Tatyana Providokhina	Soviet Union	2:03.3	
11	1	Christine Tranter	Great Britain	2:03.5	
11	3	Christine McMeekin	Great Britain	2:03.5	
13	3	Ann Mackie-Morelli	Canada	2:04.0	
14	2	Francine Gendron	Canada	2:04.1	
15	1	Charlotte Bradley	Mexico	2:04.2	
16	2	Suyette Latter	United States	2:05.6	
17	3	Martine Rooms	France	2:06.1	
18	1	Sakina Boutamine	Algeria	2:06.7	
19	2	Angela Cook	Australia	2:07.1	
20	2	Chantal Jouvhomme	France	2:07.6	
21	1	Vesna Juras	Yugoslavia	2:08.2	
22	2	Jozefína Čerchlanová	Czechoslovakia	2:14.1	
23	2	Sosor Sarantuja	Mongolia	2:19.7	

=== Final ===
Rank	Athlete	Nationality	Time	Notes
1st place, gold medalist(s)	Totka Petrova	Bulgaria	1:57.6	
2nd place, silver medalist(s)	Tatyana Kazankina	Soviet Union	1:58.6	
3rd place, bronze medalist(s)	Svetla Koleva	Bulgaria	1:58.9	
4	Fița Lovin	Romania	1:59.0	
5	Elena Tărîță	Romania	2:00.3	
6	Christiane Stoll	East Germany	2:00.7	
7	Jolanta Januchta	Poland	2:00.8	
8	Lore Laugnammer	East Germany	2:00.9	
