= 1980 European Athletics Indoor Championships – Women's 800 metres =

The women's 800 metres event at the 1980 European Athletics Indoor Championships was held on 1 and 2 March in Sindelfingen.

== Medalists ==
Gold	Silver	Bronze
Jolanta Januchta; Poland	Anne-Marie Van Nuffel; Belgium	Liz Barnes; Great Britain

== Results ==
=== Heats ===
First 2 from each heat (Q) and the next 2 fastest (q) qualified for the final.

Rank	Heat	Name	Nationality	Time	Notes
1	2	Liz Barnes	Great Britain	2:05.2	Q
2	2	Elżbieta Katolik	Poland	2:05.3	Q
3	2	Violeta Tsvetkova	Bulgaria	2:05.3	q
4	1	Anne-Marie Van Nuffel	Belgium	2:05.7	Q
4	2	Kirsti Voldnes	Norway	2:05.7	q
6	1	Jolanta Januchta	Poland	2:06.3	Q
7	1	Fița Lovin	Romania	2:06.4	
8	1	Petra Kleinbrahm	West Germany	2:06.5	
9	2	Brigitte Koczelnik	West Germany	2:07.7	
10	2	Rosa María Colorado	Spain	2:08.2	
11	1	Mary Appleby	Ireland	2:08.8	

=== Final ===
Rank	Name	Nationality	Time	Notes
1st place, gold medalist(s)	Jolanta Januchta	Poland	2:00.6	CR
2nd place, silver medalist(s)	Anne-Marie Van Nuffel	Belgium	2:00.9	
3rd place, bronze medalist(s)	Liz Barnes	Great Britain	2:01.5	
4	Elżbieta Katolik	Poland	2:02.3	
5	Violeta Tsvetkova	Bulgaria	2:02.8	
6	Kirsti Voldnes	Norway	2:03.8	NR
