= Athletics at the 1973 Summer Universiade – Women's 800 metres =

The women's 800 metres event at the 1973 Summer Universiade was held at the Central Lenin Stadium in Moscow on 19 and 20 August.

== Medalists ==
Gold	Silver	Bronze
Lilyana Tomova; Bulgaria	Nijolė Sabaitė; Soviet Union	Elżbieta Katolik; Poland

== Results ==
=== Heats ===
Rank	Heat	Athlete	Nationality	Time	Notes
1	1	Svetla Zlateva	Bulgaria	1:58.85	Q
2	1	Glenda Reiser	Canada	2:03.17	Q
3	1	Cheryl Toussaint	United States	2:04.6	
4	1	Christiane Casapicola	Austria	2:05.35	
5	1	Geertje Meersseman	Belgium	2:12.6	
	1	Sylvia Schenk	West Germany	DNF	
1	2	Maritta Politz	East Germany	2:02.48	Q
2	2	Valentina Gerasimova	Soviet Union	2:03.16	Q
3	2	Charlotte Bradley	Mexico	2:03.16	
4	2	Martine Duvivier	France	2:05.56	
5	2	Hilary Tanner	Great Britain	2:06.9	
6	2	Marjan Burggraaf	Netherlands	2:07.47	
	2	Zina Boniolo	Italy	DNF	
1	3	Lilyana Tomova	Bulgaria	2:02.23	Q
2	3	Paola Pigni	Italy	2:02.99	Q
3	3	Beate Wobig	East Germany	2:03.51	
4	3	Brenda Walsh	Canada	2:03.85	
5	3	Norine Braithwaite	Great Britain	2:05.28	
6	3	Anna Bełtowska	Poland	2:07.2	
	3	Maria Sykora	Austria	DNF	
1	4	Nijolė Sabaitė	Soviet Union	2:02.23	Q
2	4	Elżbieta Katolik	Poland	2:06.1	Q
3	4	Enriqueta Nava	Mexico	2:09.5	
4	4	Nancy Shafer	United States	2:13.4	
	4	Elisabeth Oberholzer	Switzerland	DNF	
	4	Marie-Francoise Dubois	France	DNF	

=== Final ===
Rank	Athlete	Nationality	Time	Notes
1st place, gold medalist(s)	Lilyana Tomova	Bulgaria	1:59.52	
2nd place, silver medalist(s)	Nijolė Sabaitė	Soviet Union	2:00.19	
3rd place, bronze medalist(s)	Elżbieta Katolik	Poland	2:00.85	
4	Maritta Politz	East Germany	2:01.96	
5	Paola Pigni	Italy	2:02.63	
6	Valentina Gerasimova	Soviet Union	2:03.29	
7	Glenda Reiser	Canada	2:03.57	
	Svetla Zlateva	Bulgaria	DNF	
