= 1976 European Athletics Indoor Championships – Women's 800 metres =

The women's 800 metres event at the 1976 European Athletics Indoor Championships was held on 21 and 22 February in Munich.

== Medalists ==
Gold	Silver	Bronze
Nikolina Shtereva; Bulgaria	Lilyana Tomova; Bulgaria	Gisela Klein; West Germany

== Results ==
=== Heats ===
First 3 from each heat (Q) qualified directly for the final.

Rank	Heat	Name	Nationality	Time	Notes
1	1	Nikolina Shtereva	Bulgaria	2:05.4	Q
2	1	Ivanka Bonova	Bulgaria	2:06.4	Q
3	1	Angelika Traugott	West Germany	2:06.4	Q
4	1	Jolanta Januchta	Poland	2:08.5	
5	2	Gisela Klein	West Germany	2:09.6	Q
6	2	Lilyana Tomova	Bulgaria	2:09.7	Q
7	2	Jozefína Čerchlanová	Czechoslovakia	2:10.2	Q
8	2	Ann Larsson	Sweden	2:10.5	
9	2	Maria Ritter	Liechtenstein	2:15.4	NR

=== Final ===
Rank	Name	Nationality	Time	Notes
1st place, gold medalist(s)	Nikolina Shtereva	Bulgaria	2:02.2	CR
2nd place, silver medalist(s)	Lilyana Tomova	Bulgaria	2:02.6	
3rd place, bronze medalist(s)	Gisela Klein	West Germany	2:03.2	
4	Ivanka Bonova	Bulgaria	2:04.5	
5	Angelika Traugott	West Germany	2:04.9	
6	Jozefína Čerchlanová	Czechoslovakia	2:15.9	
