= 1974 European Athletics Indoor Championships – Women's 800 metres =

The women's 800 metres event at the 1974 European Athletics Indoor Championships was held on 9 and 10 March in Gothenburg.

== Medalists ==
Gold	Silver	Bronze
Elżbieta Katolik; Poland	Gisela Ellenberger; West Germany	Gunhild Hoffmeister; East Germany

== Results ==
=== Heats ===
Held on 9 March.
First 3 from each heat (Q) qualified directly for the final.

Rank	Heat	Name	Nationality	Time	Notes
1	2	Elżbieta Katolik	Poland	2:04.05	Q
2	1	Gisela Ellenberger	West Germany	2:04.31	Q
3	2	Gunhild Hoffmeister	East Germany	2:05.26	Q
4	1	Lilyana Tomova-Todorova	Bulgaria	2:05.34	Q
5	2	Rosemary Wright	Great Britain	2:05.90	Q, NR
6	1	Valentina Gerasimova	Soviet Union	2:06.10	Q
7	2	Gunilla Lindh	Sweden	2:07.49	
8	1	Anita Barkusky	East Germany	2:07.63	
9	2	Rositsa Pekhlivanova	Bulgaria	2:10.63	
10	1	Jolanta Januchta	Poland	2:11.67	
11	1	Åse Svinsholt	Norway	2:13.75	
	1	Nikolina Shtereva	Bulgaria	DNF	
	2	Nijolė Razienė	Soviet Union	DNF	

=== Final ===
Held on 10 March.

Rank	Name	Nationality	Time	Notes
1st place, gold medalist(s)	Elżbieta Katolik	Poland	2:02.38	AR
2nd place, silver medalist(s)	Gisela Ellenberger	West Germany	2:02.54	NR
3rd place, bronze medalist(s)	Gunhild Hoffmeister	East Germany	2:02.59	NR
4	Rosemary Wright	Great Britain	2:05.19	NR
5	Valentina Gerasimova	Soviet Union	2:10.76	
	Lilyana Tomova-Todorova	Bulgaria	DNF	
