= Athletics at the 1977 Summer Universiade – Women's 1500 metres =

The women's 1500 metres event at the 1977 Summer Universiade was held at the Vasil Levski National Stadium in Sofia on 22 and 23 August.

== Medalists ==
Gold	Silver	Bronze
Totka Petrova; Bulgaria	Natalia Mărăşescu; Romania	Maricica Puică; Romania

== Results ==
=== Heats ===
Rank	Heat	Athlete	Nationality	Time	Notes
1	1	Christine Tranter	Great Britain	4:13.7	Q
1	1	Vesela Yatsinska	Bulgaria	4:13.7	Q
3	1	Natalia Mărășescu	Romania	4:13.9	Q
4	1	Lyubov Ivanova	Soviet Union	4:14.0	Q
5	2	Maricica Puică	Romania	4:15.8	Q
6	1	Julie Brown	United States	4:16.1	Q
7	1	Penny Werthner	Canada	4:16.7	q
8	2	Charlotte Bradley	Mexico	4:17.0	Q
9	2	Totka Petrova	Bulgaria	4:17.3	Q
10	2	Waltraud Strotzer	East Germany	4:17.4	Q
11	2	Celina Sokołowska	Poland	4:18.5	Q
12	1	Angela Cook	Australia	4:18.6	q
13	2	Sakina Boutamine	Algeria	4:19.1	
14	2	Valentina Ilyinykh	Soviet Union	4:23.1	
15	2	Debbie Scott	Canada	4:25.1	
16	1	Geertje Meersseman	Belgium	4:25.4	
17	1	Margherita Gargano	Italy	4:39.3	
18	1	Sosor Sarantuja	Mongolia	4:44.5	

=== Final ===
Rank	Athlete	Nationality	Time	Notes
1st place, gold medalist(s)	Totka Petrova	Bulgaria	4:05.7	
2nd place, silver medalist(s)	Natalia Mărășescu	Romania	4:05.8	
3rd place, bronze medalist(s)	Maricica Puică	Romania	4:06.4	
4	Vesela Yatsinska	Bulgaria	4:07.2	
5	Christine Tranter	Great Britain	4:09.7	
6	Lyubov Ivanova	Soviet Union	4:11.8	
7	Waltraud Strotzer	East Germany	4:13.2	
8	Penny Werthner	Canada	4:13.2	
9	Julie Brown	United States	4:13.6	
10	Charlotte Bradley	Mexico	4:14.7	NR
11	Celina Sokołowska	Poland	4:18.1	
12	Angela Cook	Australia	4:19.6	
