= Kharchenko =

Kharchenko is a Ukrainian-language surname. The surname may refer to:

- Boris Kharchenko (1927–1985), Soviet painter
- Ihor Kharchenko (born 1962), Ukrainian diplomat
- Ivan Kharchenko (1918–1989), Soviet Army engineering colonel
- Maria Kharchenko (born 1991), Russian politician
- Nadezhda Kharchenko (born 1987), Russian footballer
- Petro Kharchenko (born 1983), Ukrainian pair skater
- Vadim Kharchenko (born 1984), Kyrgyzstani footballer
- Vadym Kharchenko (born 1975), Ukrainian footballer
- Valentina Kharchenko (born 1949), Russian track and field athlete
- Yekaterina Kharchenko (born 1977), Russian politician
- Yuri Kharchenko (born 1963), Soviet luger
- Yury Kharchenko (born 1986), German artist
