= Athletics at the 1973 Summer Universiade – Women's 1500 metres =

The women's 1500 metres event at the 1973 Summer Universiade was held at the Central Lenin Stadium in Moscow with the final on 17 August. It was the first time that this event was contested by women at the Uniersiade.

== Results ==
Rank	Athlete	Nationality	Time	Notes
1st place, gold medalist(s)	Paola Pigni-Cacchi	Italy	4:10.69	
2nd place, silver medalist(s)	Glenda Reiser	Canada	4:12.50	
3rd place, bronze medalist(s)	Tonka Petrova	Bulgaria	4:13.50	
4	Thelma Wright	Canada	4:13.82	
5	Tatyana Kazankina	Soviet Union	4:14.22	
6	Norine Braithwaite	Great Britain	4:15.30	
7	Skaidrite Velberga	Soviet Union	4:18.97	
8	Margherita Gargano	Italy	4:21.8	
9	Izabela Mróz	Poland	4:24.5	
10	Enriqueta Nava	Mexico	4:24.55	
11	Marie-Françoise Dubois	France	4:25.64	
12	Kathy Gibbons	United States	4:26.4	
13	Francie Larrieu	United States	4:29.8	
14	Sylvia Schenk	West Germany	4:31.04	
15	Yolande Roche	France	4:32.08	
16	Charlotte Bradley	Mexico	4:35.12	
17	Geertje Meersseman	Belgium	4:40.4	
