= 1978 European Athletics Championships – Women's 1500 metres =

Women's 1500 metres at the European Athletics Championships

The women's 1500 metres at the 1978 European Athletics Championships was held in Prague, then Czechoslovakia, at Stadion Evžena Rošického on 1 and 3 September 1978.

== Medalists ==
Gold	Giana Romanova; Soviet Union
Silver	Natalia Mărăşescu; Romania
Bronze	Totka Petrova; Bulgaria

== Results ==
=== Final ===
3 September

Rank	Name	Nationality	Time	Notes
1st place, gold medalist(s)	Giana Romanova	Soviet Union	3:59.01	CR
2nd place, silver medalist(s)	Natalia Mărăşescu	Romania	3:59.77	
3rd place, bronze medalist(s)	Totka Petrova	Bulgaria	4:00.15	
4	Valentina Ilyinykh	Soviet Union	4:00.18	
5	Grete Waitz	Norway	4:00.55	NR
6	Gabriella Dorio	Italy	4:01.25	
7	Ulrike Bruns	East Germany	4:02.20	
8	Cornelia Bürki	Switzerland	4:04.60	
9	Vesela Yatsinska	Bulgaria	4:04.73	
10	Lyudmila Kalnitskaya	Soviet Union	4:06.6	
11	Maricica Puică	Romania	4:09.3	
12	Christine Benning	Great Britain	4:11.5	

=== Heats ===
1 September

==== Heat 1 ====
Rank	Name	Nationality	Time	Notes
1	Ulrike Bruns	East Germany	4:11.50	Q
2	Gabriella Dorio	Italy	4:11.5	Q
3	Vesela Yatsinska	Bulgaria	4:11.7	Q
4	Giana Romanova	Soviet Union	4:11.8	Q
5	Cornelia Bürki	Switzerland	4:11.8	Q
6	Brigitte Kraus	West Germany	4:11.9	
7	Mary Stewart	Great Britain	4:17.5	
8	Tineke Kluft	Netherlands	4:17.7	
9	Irén Lipcsei	Hungary	4:20.2	
10	Fernande Schmitt	Luxembourg	4:31.3	

==== Heat 2 ====
Rank	Name	Nationality	Time	Notes
1	Natalia Mărăşescu	Romania	4:05.76	Q
2	Maricica Puică	Romania	4:06.1	Q
3	Valentina Ilyinykh	Soviet Union	4:06.3	Q
4	Grete Waitz	Norway	4:06.3	Q
5	Lyudmila Kalnitskaya	Soviet Union	4:06.7	Q
6	Totka Petrova	Bulgaria	4:07.2	q
7	Christine Benning	Great Britain	4:11.8	q
8	Magdolna Lázár	Hungary	4:14.4	
9	Drahomíra Zvoníčková	Czechoslovakia	4:19.2	
10	Véronique Renties	France	4:40.3	

== Participation ==
According to an unofficial count, 20 athletes from 14 countries participated in the event.

- Bulgaria (2)
- Czechoslovakia (1)
- East Germany (1)
- France (1)
- Hungary (2)
- Italy (1)
- Luxembourg (1)
- Netherlands (1)
- Norway (1)
- Romania (2)
- Soviet Union (3)
- Switzerland (1)
- Great Britain (2)
- West Germany (1)
