= 1975 European Athletics Indoor Championships – Women's 800 metres =

The women's 800 metres event at the 1975 European Athletics Indoor Championships was held on 8 and 9 March in Katowice.

== Medalists ==
Gold	Silver	Bronze
Anita Barkusky; East Germany	Sarmīte Štūla; Soviet Union	Rositsa Pekhlivanova; Bulgaria

== Results ==
=== Heats ===
Held on 8 March.
First 2 from each heat (Q) and the next 2 fastest (q) qualified for the semifinals.

Rank	Heat	Name	Nationality	Time	Notes
1	1	Sarmīte Štūla	Soviet Union	2:06.6	Q
2	1	Anita Barkusky	East Germany	2:06.9	Q
2	2	Elżbieta Katolik	Poland	2:06.9	Q
4	2	Nikolina Shtereva	Bulgaria	2:07.1	Q
5	1	Colette Besson	France	2:07.2	q
6	1	Rositsa Pekhlivanova	Bulgaria	2:07.4	q
7	2	Valentina Gerasimova	Soviet Union	2:07.8	
8	2	Brigitte Kraus	West Germany	2:08.1	
9	2	Jozefína Čerchlanová	Czechoslovakia	2:08.3	
10	1	Barbara Waśniewska	Poland	2:08.4	
11	2	Anne-Marie Van Nuffel	Belgium	2:12.8	
12	2	Chantal Jouvhomme	France	2:13.9	

=== Final ===
Held on 9 March.

Rank	Name	Nationality	Time	Notes
1st place, gold medalist(s)	Anita Barkusky	East Germany	2:05.6	
2nd place, silver medalist(s)	Sarmīte Štūla	Soviet Union	2:06.2	
3rd place, bronze medalist(s)	Rositsa Pekhlivanova	Bulgaria	2:06.3	
4	Elżbieta Katolik	Poland	2:08.3	
5	Colette Besson	France	2:11.5	
6	Nikolina Shtereva	Bulgaria	2:20.3	
