= List of Balkan Athletics Championships winners =

List of Balkan Athletics Championships winners may refer to:

- List of Balkan Athletics Championships winners (men)
- List of Balkan Athletics Championships winners (women)
