= 1982 European Athletics Indoor Championships – Women's 800 metres =

The women's 800 metres event at the 1982 European Athletics Indoor Championships was held on 6–7 March.

== Medalists ==
Gold	Silver	Bronze
Doina Melinte; Romania	Martina Steuk; East Germany	Jolanta Januchta; Poland

== Results ==
=== Heats ===
First 2 from each heat (Q) and the next 2 fastest (q) qualified for the final.

Rank	Heat	Name	Nationality	Time	Notes
1	2	Doina Melinte	Romania	2:04.67	Q
2	2	Nikolina Shtereva	Bulgaria	2:05.01	Q
3	1	Jolanta Januchta	Poland	2:05.08	Q
4	1	Martina Steuk	East Germany	2:05.10	Q
5	2	Simone Büngener	West Germany	2:05.12	q
6	2	Bernadette Louis	France	2:05.24	q
7	1	Elly van Hulst	Netherlands	2:05.38	
8	2	Rosine Wallez	Belgium	2:05.50	
9	1	Zuzana Moravčíková	Czechoslovakia	2:05.66	
10	1	Petra Kleinbrahm	West Germany	2:06.77	

=== Final ===
Rank	Name	Nationality	Time	Notes
1st place, gold medalist(s)	Doina Melinte	Romania	2:00.39	CR, NR
2nd place, silver medalist(s)	Martina Steuk	East Germany	2:01.07	
3rd place, bronze medalist(s)	Jolanta Januchta	Poland	2:01.24	
4	Bernadette Louis	France	2:03.12	
5	Simone Büngener	West Germany	2:03.78	
6	Nikolina Shtereva	Bulgaria	2:04.21	
