= Charlotte Bradley (runner) =

Mexican middle-distance runner

Personal information
- Full name: Charlotte Bradley Reus
- Born: 18 February 1952 (age 74) Mexico City, Mexico
- Education: National Autonomous University

Sport
- Sport: Athletics
- Event(s): 800 metres, 1500 metres
Medal record
Representing Mexico
Central American and Caribbean Games
Gold medal – first place	1974 Santo Domingo	800m
Gold medal – first place	1978 Medellin	1500m
Silver medal – second place	1978 Medellin	800m

Charlotte Bradley Reus (born 18 February 1952) is a retired Mexican middle-distance runner. She won multiple medals at regional level.

== International competitions ==
Year	Competition	Venue	Position	Event	Notes
Representing Mexico
1973	Central American and Caribbean Championships	Maracaibo, Venezuela	1st	800 m	2:05.8
1973	Central American and Caribbean Championships	Maracaibo, Venezuela	2nd	1500 m	4:35.1
1973	Universiade	Moscow, Soviet Union	7th (h)	800 m	2:03.16
1973	Universiade	Moscow, Soviet Union	16th	1500 m	4:35.12
1974	Central American and Caribbean Games	Santo Domingo, Dominican Republic	6th	400 m	55.90
1974	Central American and Caribbean Games	Santo Domingo, Dominican Republic	1st	800 m	2:04.55
1975	Central American and Caribbean Championships	Ponce, Puerto Rico	2nd	800 m	2:18.1
1975	Central American and Caribbean Championships	Ponce, Puerto Rico	1st	1500 m	4:34.1
1977	Central American and Caribbean Championships	Xalapa, Mexico	1st	800 m	2:07.46
1977	Central American and Caribbean Championships	Xalapa, Mexico	1st	1500 m	4:29.65
1977	Central American and Caribbean Championships	Xalapa, Mexico	1st	3000 m	10:00.61
1977	Universiade	Sofia, Bulgaria	15th (h)	800 m	2:04.2
1977	Universiade	Sofia, Bulgaria	10th	1500 m	4:14.7
1978	Central American and Caribbean Games	Medellín, Colombia	2nd	800 m	2:03.58
1978	Central American and Caribbean Games	Medellín, Colombia	1st	1500 m	4:13.7

== Personal bests ==
- 800 metres – 2:02.4 (1977) former NR
- 1500 metres – 4:14.70 (Sofia 1977) former NR
