= Martina Steuk =

German former track and field athlete (born 1959)

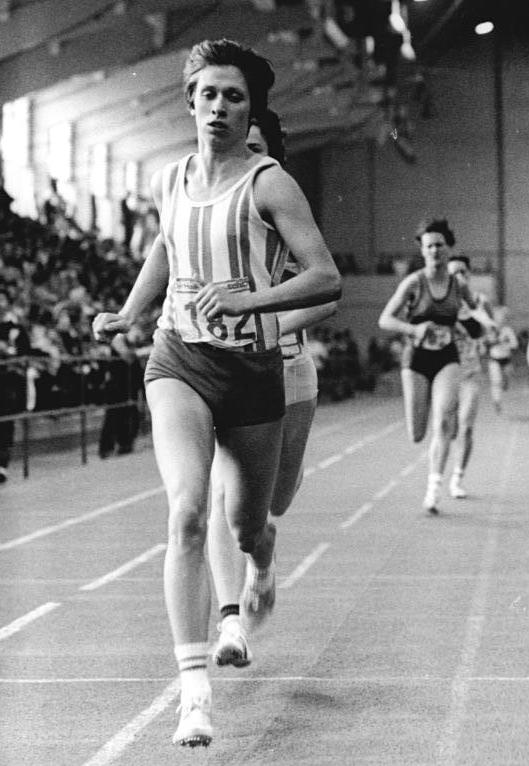
- Steuk competing at the 1982 East German Indoor Championships

Personal information
- Born: Martina Kämpfert; 11 November 1959 (age 65) East Berlin, East Germany
- Height: 168 cm (5 ft 6 in)

Martina Steuk (née Kämpfert; born 11 November 1959) is a German former track and field athlete who represented East Germany. She competed in the 800 metres and occasionally the 400 metres.

Her first success came at the 1977 European Athletics Junior Championships, where she won the 800 m title. At the age of 20, she reached the final in the 800 metres at the 1980 Moscow Olympics and placed fourth in a lifetime best time of 1:56.21 behind the Soviet trio of Nadiya Olizarenko, Olga Mineyeva and Tatyana Providokhina, Olizarenko breaking the world record. A successful 1981 season followed, which included a win at the 1981 European Cup, and at the 1981 IAAF World Cup she won an 800 m silver behind Lyudmila Veselkova and a gold with the East German 4 × 400 metres relay team. She ranked second in the world that year for the 800 m behind Vesselkova with a time of 1:57.16. That success continued into 1982 with a silver medal at the 1982 European Athletics Indoor Championships, finishing second only to Romania's Doina Melinte. She was top of the world indoor rankings that season with 1:59.24 minutes.

She was a three-time national champion, winning the 800 m at the East German Athletics Championships in 1981 before taking a national indoor and outdoor double in 1982.

She holds one of the fastest times for the 1000 metres at 2:30.85 minutes. This was the second fastest ever when it was set in 1980, behind Soviet runner Tatyana Providokhina, though it remained the fastest recorded electronically recorded time for ten years. It remains the best mark by an under-23 athlete and she also holds the under-23 best for the 600 metres event with 1:24.56 minutes.

Steuk was born in Berlin and was a member of her local club Berliner TSC. She married East German hammer thrower Roland Steuk in 1991. The two subsequently divorced. She was awarded the Patriotic Order of Merit for her athletic feats in 1982.

== International competitions ==
Year	Competition	Venue	Position	Event	Notes
1977	European Junior Championships	Donetsk, Soviet Union	1st	800 m	2:01.7
1980	Olympic Games	Moscow, Soviet Union	4th	800 m	1:56.3
1981	European Cup	Zagreb, Yugoslavia	1st	800 m	1:57.16
1981	World Cup	Rome, Italy	2nd	800 m	1:58.31
1981	World Cup	Rome, Italy	1st	4 × 400 m relay	3:20.62
1982	European Indoor Championships	Milan, Italy	2nd	800 m	2:01.07

== National titles ==
- East German Athletics Championships
  - 800 m: 1981, 1982
- East German Indoor Athletics Championships
  - 800 m: 1982

== Personal bests ==
- 400 metres – 52.88 sec (1987)
- 400 metres indoor – 52.8 sec (1980)
- 600 metres – 1:24.56 min (1981)
- 800 metres – 1:56.21 min (1980)
- 800 metres indoor – 1:59.24 min (1982)
- 1000 metres – 2:30.85 min (1980)
- 4 × 400 metres relay – 3:20.62 min (1981)

All information from All-Athletics.

== See also ==
- East Germany at the 1980 Summer Olympics
