= Liz Barnes =

English middle-distance runner

Personal information
- Nationality: British (English)
- Born: 3 August 1951 (age 74) Woolwich, London, England
- Height: 163 cm (5 ft 4 in)
- Weight: 54 kg (119 lb)

Sport
- Sport: Athletics
- Event: Middle-distance running
- Club: Cambridge Harriers
Medal record
Women's athletics
Representing Great Britain
European Indoor Championships
| Bronze medal – third place | 1980 Sindelfingen | 800 m |

Elizabeth Ann Barnes (married name Laban; born 3 August 1951) is an English former middle-distance runner. She represented Great Britain in the women's 800 metres at the 1976 Montreal Olympics and won a bronze medal in the 800m at the 1980 European Indoor Championships.

== Biography ==
As Liz Barnes, finished third behind Donna Murray in the 400 metres event at the 1975 WAAA Championships.

Barnes ran her lifetime best for the 800 metres with 2:01.35 on 10 July 1976 in Zurich, before going on to compete at the 1976 Olympic Games in Montreal, where she was eliminated in the heats of the 800m, running 2:01.70, and finished seventh in the final of the 4 × 400m relay, along with Gladys Taylor, Verona Elder and Donna Murray.

At the 1978 Commonwealth Games representing England in Edmonton, Alberta, Canada, Barnes finished fourth in the 800 m final in 2:03.41. Three weeks later, she reached the semifinals at the 1978 European Championships in Prague, running 2:01.69.

Barnes finished second behind Christina Boxer in 2:02.04 at the 1979 UK Championships and third in 2:02.74 behind Chris Benning and Janet Prictoe at the 1979 WAAA Championships, before going on to win a bronze medal at the 1980 European Indoor Championships in Sindelfingen. Her time of 2:01.5 moved her to second on the British Indoor all-time list behind Jane Colebrook's 2:01.12 from 1977. She would remain second on the British indoor all-time list until Kelly Holmes ran 1:59.21 in 2003.

== International competitions ==
| Year | Competition | Venue | Position | Event | Notes |
Representing Great Britain / England
| 1976 | Olympic Games | Montreal, Canada | 15th (h) | 800 m | 2:01.70 |
| 1976 | Olympic Games | Montreal, Canada | 7th | 4 × 400 m | 3:28.01 |
| 1978 | Commonwealth Games | Edmonton, Canada | 4th | 800 m | 2:03.41 |
| 1978 | European Championships | Prague, Czechoslavkia | 11th (sf) | 800 m | 2:01.69 |
| 1980 | European Indoor Championships | Sindelfingen, Germany | 3rd | 800 m | 2:01.5 |
(#) Indicates overall position in qualifying heats (h) or semifinals (sf)
