= Jolanta Januchta =

Polish middle-distance runner

Personal information
- Born: 16 January 1955 (age 71) Bielsko-Biała, Poland
- Height: 1.63 m (5 ft 4 in)
- Weight: 53 kg (117 lb)

Sport
- Sport: Athletics
- Event: 800 m
- Club: MKS Beskid Bielsko-Biała; Piast Gliwice; AZS Poznań; Gwardia Warszawa
- Coached by: Jan Mazur; Jan Panzer
Medal record
Women's athletics
Representing Poland
European Indoor Championships
Gold medal – first place	1980 Sindelfingen	800 m

Jolanta Januchta-Strzelczyk (born 16 January 1955) is a Polish former middle-distance runner specialising in the 800 metres. She won the gold medal at the 1980 European Indoor Championships and bronze at the 1982 edition. In addition, she represented her country at the 1980 Summer Olympics as well as the 1983 World Championships.

Her personal best of 1:56.95 is the still standing national record.

She is currently a physical education teacher at a primary school in Warsaw.

== International competitions ==
Year	Competition	Venue	Position	Event	Notes
Representing Poland
1973	European Junior Championships	Duisburg, West Germany	6th	800 m	2:04.58
1974	European Indoor Championships	Gothenburg, Sweden	10th (h)	800 m	2:11.67
1974	European Championships	Rome, Italy	17th (h)	800 m	2:04.7
1976	European Indoor Championships	Munich, West Germany	4th (h)	800 m	2:08.5
1977	Universiade	Sofia, Bulgaria	7th	800 m	2:00.8
1980	European Indoor Championships	Sindelfingen, West Germany	1st	800 m	2:00.6
1980	Olympic Games	Moscow, Soviet Union	6th	800 m	1:58.3
1980	Olympic Games	Moscow, Soviet Union	6th	4 × 400 m relay	3:27.9
1981	World Cup	Rome, Italy	3rd	800 m	1:58.32^{1}
1982	European Indoor Championships	Milan, Italy	3rd	800 m	2:01.24
1982	European Championships	Athens, Greece	4th	800 m	1:57.92
1982	European Championships	Athens, Greece	7th	4 × 400 m relay	3:29.32
1983	World Championships	Helsinki, Finland	12th (sf)	800 m	2:02.23
1984	Friendship Games	Prague, Czechoslovakia	10th	800 m	2:02.49
1984	Friendship Games	Prague, Czechoslovakia	4th	4 × 400 m relay	3:29.09

^{1}Representing Europe

== Personal bests ==
Outdoor

- 400 metres – 55.73 (Wanganui 1984)
- 800 metres – 1:56.95 (Budapest 1980)
- 1000 metres – 2:32.70 (Zürich 1981)
- 1500 metres – 4:13.63 (Bydgoszcz 1983)

Indoor

- 600 metres – 1:26.6 (Warsaw 1980)
- 800 metres – 2:00.6 (Sindelfingen 1980)
