= Gül Çiray =

Turkish middle-distance runner (1939–2019)

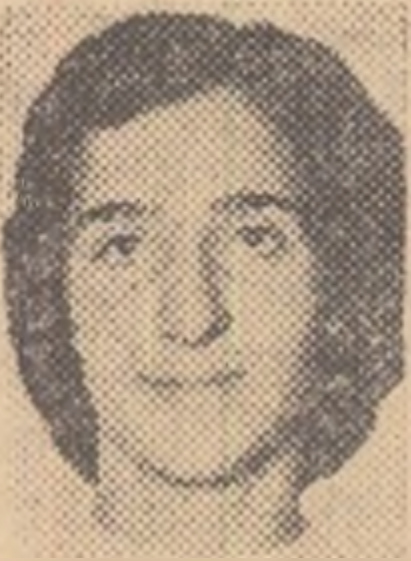

Personal information
- Nationality: Turkish
- Born: 27 November 1939 Vidin, Bulgaria
- Died: 25 August 2019 (aged 79)

Sport
- Sport: Middle-distance running
- Event: 800 metres

Gül Çiray Akbaş (27 November 1939 – 25 August 2019) was a Turkish middle-distance runner. She competed in the women's 800 metres at the 1960 Summer Olympics.
