= Alma Qeramixhi =

Albanian heptathlete (born 1963)

Alma Qeramixhi (born November 9, 1963, in Korçë) is an Albanian heptathlete who represented her country in the 1992 Summer Olympics. She competed in the women's heptathlon

In 1989, she set the Albanian record for the 100 m. hurdles event which she still holds. She also set in 1990 the Albanian record in heptathlon, which she also still holds.
