= Olga Mineyeva =

Soviet athlete

Personal information
- Born: September 1, 1952
Medal record
Women's athletics
Representing the Soviet Union
Olympic Games
| Silver medal – second place | 1980 Moscow | 800 m |
European Championships
| Gold medal – first place | 1982 Athens | 800 m |
| Bronze medal – third place | 1982 Athens | 4×400 m |

Olga Pavlovna Mineyeva, née Syrovatskaya, (Russian: Ольга Павловна Минеева; born September 1, 1952, in Degtyarsk, Sverdlovsk Oblast) is a Soviet athlete, who competed for the USSR at the 1980 Summer Olympics held in Moscow, Russia. There she won the silver medal in the 800 metres in 1:54.81 minutes, splitting teammates Nadezhda Olizarenko and Tatyana Providokhina for a Soviet clean sweep of the medals. She also won the gold medal in the 800 metres at the 1982 European Championships in Athletics, finishing with a time of 1:55.41 at the event in Athens. At the same championships she was a member of the bronze medal-winning Soviet team in the 400 metres relay.
