= Yury Kharchenko =

German painter

Yury Kharchenko (Russian Юрий Харченко, born 1986 in Moscow, Soviet Union) is a German artist. He lives and works in Berlin.

== Life ==
Kharchenko was raised in Moscow and West Germany. He studied at the Kunstakademie Düsseldorf from 2004 to 2008, graduating with a master of fine arts degree and diploma. He was briefly in a PhD programme at the University of Potsdam from 2011 to 2012; the subject of his research was art philosophy in postmodern times influenced by Jacques Derrida. He currently lives in Berlin.

His works are part of collections in the Museum Kunstpalast Düsseldorf, NS Documentation Center Cologne, State Collection Düsseldorf, Kunst aus NRW Aachen, Felix Nussbaum Haus Osnabrück, Kunstmuseum Walter, and the Wemhöner Collection.

== Selected exhibitions ==
=== 2027 ===
- Städtische Galerie Tuttlingen (solo)
- Religio Museum, Telgte (group)

=== 2026 ===
- Yury Kharchenko / Vitaly Komar, Kunstverein Familie Montez, Frankfurt am Main
- Altes Haus, curated by Marat Guelman, Kunsthaus NRW, Aachen
- Klassenverhältnisse – die zweite Staffel, Kunstlehre von 1946 bis 2026, with Peter Doig, Jörg Herold, Albert Oehlen, Rosemarie Trockel, Günther Uecker, Markus Lüpertz and others
- Zitadelle, Berlin, curated by Christoph Tannert, with Arnold Dreyblatt, Emmanuel Bornstein, Zahar Zukerman, Alona Harpaz, Shira Orion, Yehudit Sasportas and others

=== 2025 ===
- Galerie Noah, Twintowers Alt-Treptow, Berlin, with A. R. Penck, Jonathan Meese, Bernd Zimmer, Karl Horst Hödicke and others
- Bad/Good Jews, Bunker Berlin, curated by Yury Kharchenko, Aljosha Samjatin and Marat Guelman, with Art Spiegelman, Alexander Melamid, Michail Grobman, Marat Guelman
- Philadelphia Museum of Jewish Art (group), with Archie Rand, Joel Silverstein, Yona Verwer, Tobi Kahn, Yigal Ozeri and others

=== 2024 ===
- Hällisch-Fränkisches Museum, Schwäbisch Hall (solo)

=== 2022 ===
- Richard Haizmann Museum, Niebüll (Kunstverein Niebüll e.V.) (solo)
- Kunstverein Krefeld (solo)

=== 2021 ===
- MiQua. LVR-Jewish Museum in the Archaeological Quarter Cologne at Wallraf-Richartz-Museum, Cologne. Panel discussion with Prof. Dr. Micha Brumlik, Rita Kersting (Museum Ludwig, Cologne), Kay Heymer (Museum Kunstpalast Düsseldorf); moderator: Dr. Michael Köhler

=== 2020 ===
- Messe in St. Agnes, Johann König Galerie, Berlin (group)
- Berlinische Galerie (group)
- Hamburger Kunsthalle (group)
- Kunstmuseum Bonn (group)
- HEART, in collaboration with the United Nations, with Jenny Holzer, Thomas Klipper, Anselm Kiefer, Katharina Grosse, Rose Wylie, Antje Majewski, Douglas Gordon, Joseph Kosuth, Candida Höfer, Norbert Bisky, Henning Strassburger, Nevin Aladağ, Abraham David Christian, Assaf Gruber, Reinhard Mucha, Monica Bonvicini, Anish Kapoor and others
- Biennale Ansbach (group), with Jonas Burgert, Justine Otto, Nicola Samorì, Martin Kobe and others

=== 2019 ===
- Michael Horbach Stiftung, Cologne (group)
- Avanti, with Leiko Ikemura, Frauke Dannert, Katharina Jahnke, Philipp Schwalb and others
- St. Joseph, Münster (solo)
- Franz Hitze Haus, Münster (solo)
- Lachenmann Art, Frankfurt am Main (group), with Jonathan Meese, Justine Otto, Philipp Grözinger
- Lachenmann Art, Konstanz (solo)

=== 2018 ===
- Kunstmuseum Bochum, Bild Macht Religion, with Jake and Dinos Chapman, Andy Warhol, Gerhard Richter, Martin Kippenberger, Arnulf Rainer, Joseph Beuys, Imi Knoebel, Berlinde De Bruyckere, David LaChapelle, Hermann Nitsch, Nam June Paik, Sigalit Landau
- Felix Nussbaum Haus, Osnabrück (solo)
- NS-Dokumentationszentrum, Cologne (solo)
- Kunsthaus NRW, Aachen, with Thea Djordjadze, Anna K.E., Yury Kharchenko, Frauke Dannert, Seb Koberstädt, Gereon Krebber, Eli Cortiñas, Florian Meisenberg
- Kunstverein Sundern
- Galerie Noah, Augsburg
- Kunstmuseum Walter im Glaspalast

=== 2017 ===
- Ketterer, Berlin, with Thomas Zipp, Anton Henning, Walter Stöhrer, Thomas Hartmann, Eugen Schönebeck, Bernd Koberling, K. H. Hödicke, Takeshi Makishima, Gama, Miriam Vlaming, Yury Kharchenko
- Museum Kunstpalast, Düsseldorf — new presentation of the museum collection; selected as Masterpiece of the Month, curated by Kay Heymer; podium discussion with Kay Heymer
- Luther and Avantgarde, Old Prison, Wittenberg, with Ai Weiwei, Erwin Wurm, Jonathan Meese, Isa Genzken, Olafur Eliasson, Stephan Balkenhol, Christian Jankowski, Jürgen Klauke, Günther Uecker, Tal R, Gregor Schneider, Gilbert & George, Yury Kharchenko
- Sotheby’s auction, Vienna, with Mischa Kuball, Michael van Ofen, Axel Geis, Kirstine Roepstorff, Sophie von Hellermann, Ricarda Roggan
- Alte Synagoge Essen (solo), curated by Kay Heymer

=== 2016 ===
- Clara Maria Sels Gallery (solo)
- Jüdisches Museum Westfalen (solo)
- Nordheimer Scheune, Helmut A. Müller (solo)

=== 2015 ===
- Clara Maria Sels Gallery, Düsseldorf
- Christie’s at K21, Düsseldorf
- Voyage Mezzanine
- Mirta Demare Gallery, Rotterdam
- Voyage Mezzanine
- Bonnefanten, Roermond, Netherlands
- Jagla Ausstellungsraum, Cologne
- Ober Gallery, Kent, Connecticut, USA

=== 2014 ===
- Clara Maria Sels Gallery, Düsseldorf — Ilya Kabakov, Yury Kharchenko, Panamarenko, Alexander Braun
- Bespoke, Düsseldorf, with Barbara Friedman, Nicola Stäglich
- Kunstverein Dillingen, with Thomas Huber
- Ober Gallery, Kent, Connecticut, USA, with Jasper Johns, A. R. Penck, Barbara Friedman and Donald Baechler
- Private show, art space in Chelsea, New York, curated by Nicollette Ramirez
- Schwartzsche Villa, Berlin (solo)

=== 2013 ===
- Clara Maria Sels Gallery, Düsseldorf (solo)
- Mirta Demare Gallery, Rotterdam (solo)
- Schwartzsche Villa, Berlin (solo)
- Gerhard Hofland Gallery, Amsterdam (solo)
- FRISCH, Halle am Wasser, Berlin (solo)
- Ober Gallery, Kent, Connecticut, USA (solo)
- Gene Shapiro Auctions, New York
- Museum Kunstpalast, Düsseldorf

=== 2012 ===
- Chaplini Gallery, Cologne (solo)
- Jerusalem Artists House, Jerusalem
- Kunstraum Kreuzberg/Bethanien, Berlin, with Nezaket Ekici
- Ben Uri, The London Jewish Museum of Art, London
- Prima Center, Berlin (solo)
- Kunst aus NRW Collection, Aachen
- Museum Kunstpalast, Düsseldorf

=== 2011 ===
- Museum Kunstpalast, Düsseldorf

=== 2010 ===
- Förderkoje, Art Cologne (solo)
- New Positions, Cologne — Michal Budny, Anja Schwörer, Michael Wutz, Zenita Komad, Yury Kharchenko, Johannes Wald, Eli Cortiñas, Michail Pirgelis, Rebecca Wilton, Marco Schuler, János Fodor, Vera Lossau
- Kunstraum, Düsseldorf

=== 2009 ===
- Art Cologne Project, Russian Salon, with Vadim Zakharov and Anna Parkina
- Jiří Švestka Gallery, Prague
- Otto Schweins Gallery, Cologne (solo)

=== 2008 ===
- Kunstmuseum Walter
- Galerie Noah

=== 2007 ===
- Tris Vonna-Michell / Yury Kharchenko (solo)
- European Kunsthalle Project
- Otto Schweins Gallery, Cologne (solo)
- Schuebbe Projects, Düsseldorf (solo)

=== 2006 ===
- Christie’s at Kunstsammlung Nordrhein-Westfalen, Düsseldorf

== Publications ==
- Worlds Within. Kerber Verlag, Berlin 2013, ISBN 978-3-86678-851-0.
- Journey to Jerusalem. Kerber Verlag, Berlin, 2013, ISBN 978-3-86678-795-7.
- Die Grosse Kunstausstellung NRW, Museum Kunstpalast, Düsseldorf, 2013
- Extra Verlag, Berlin, 2012, ISBN 978-3-938370-49-0.
- Boesner GmbH (Hrsg.) "Kunstwelten", Boesner, Witten, 2011, BestellNr.: 9783928003001
- Leonardo Art award, Kunstmuseum Walter, Augsburg, 2008
- Extra Verlag, Berlin 2008, ISBN 978-3-938370-28-5.
