= Elżbieta Katolik =

Polish sprinter

Personal information
- Nationality: Polish
- Born: Elżbieta Skowrońska; 9 October 1949 Warsaw, Poland
- Died: 28 June 1983 (aged 33) Sieradz, Poland
- Height: 1.70 m (5 ft 7 in)

Sport
- Event(s): 400 m, 800 m
- Club: Spójnia Warszawa; Wisła Kraków
Medal record
Women's athletics
Representing Poland
European Indoor Championships
| Gold medal – first place | 1974 Gothenburg | 800 m |
| Bronze medal – third place | 1973 Rotterdam | 800 m |
| Bronze medal – third place | 1977 San Sebastián | 800 m |
Summer Universiade
| Bronze medal – third place | 1973 Moscow | 800 m |

Elżbieta Katolik (née Skowrońska; 9 October 1949 – 28 June 1983) was a Polish middle distance runner who specialized in the 800 metres. She also ran the 400 metres and 4 × 400 metres relay.

Her main successes individually were winning the bronze medal at the 1973 Summer Universiade, the bronze medal at the 1973 European Indoor Championships, the gold medal at the 1974 European Indoor Championships and the bronze medal at the 1977 European Indoor Championships.

She also finished seventh at the 1974 European Championships, fourth at the 1975 European Indoor Championships, and fourth at the 1980 European Indoor Championships, She competed without reaching the final at the 1969 European Championships (400 metres), the 1971 European Championships, the 1972 Olympic Games, the 1978 European Indoor Championships, and the 1980 Olympic Games.

In relay races, she saw early success as a silver medalist in the medley relay at the 1969 European Indoor Games. In the 4 × 400 metres relay, she finished fifth at the 1971 European Championships and sixth at the 1980 Olympic Games. She also competed at the 1969 European Championships and the 1972 Olympic Games without reaching the final.

On the domestic level, she won the 400 metres national title in 1969 and then became Polish 800 metres champion in 1971, 1975 and 1976. She became Polish indoor champion in 1973, 1974, 1976, 1978, 1979, 1980 (800 metres) and 1977 (400 metres).

Her personal best times were 52.73 seconds in the 400 metres, achieved in 1977; and 1:57.26 minutes in the 800 metres, achieved in 1980.
