= Ulrike Bruns =

East German middle-distance runner

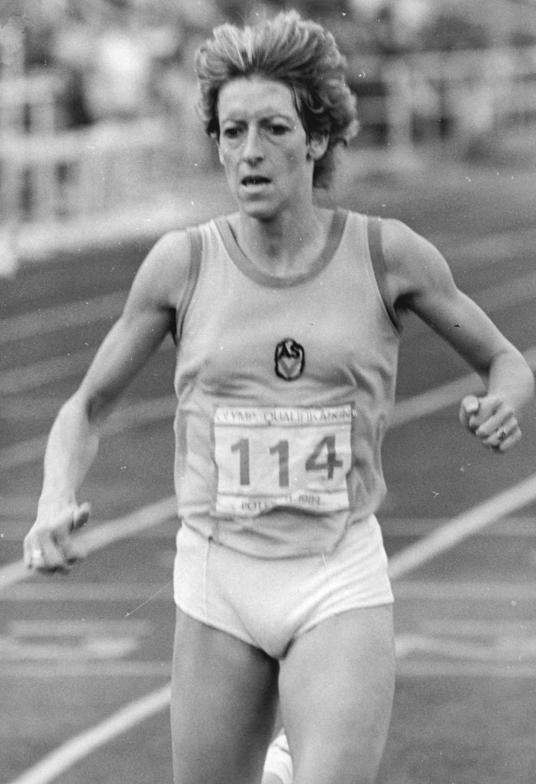

Medal record

Women's athletics

Representing East Germany

Olympic Games
Bronze medal – third place	1976 Montreal	1500 m

World Championships
Bronze medal – third place	1987 Rome	3000 m

European Championships
Bronze medal – third place	1986 Stuttgart	10,000 m

European Indoor Championships
Gold medal – first place	1978 Milan	800 m

European Cup
Silver medal – second place	1981 Zagreb	1500 m

Ulrike Bruns (née Klapezynski; born 17 November 1953) is a retired East German athlete who competed mainly in the 1500 metres and 3000 metres.

== Private life ==
Klapezynski was born in 1953 in Cottbus. She married her trainer, Jürgen Bruns (1942–2018), in 1979 and they had two children. After the German reunification, they operated a sports store in Potsdam.

== Athletics career ==
She competed for East Germany in the 1976 Summer Olympics held in Montreal, Quebec, Canada in the 1500 metres where she won the bronze medal.

She was third in 10,000 metres run at the 1986 European Championships. She took the same place at 1987 World Championships. Bruns also won 800 m at the 1978 European Athletics Indoor Championships.

Olympic and World middle-distance bronzes

She received first public attention while still competing under her maiden name of Klapezynski when performing at the 1976 Montreal Olympics. That year, she set her personal bests of 1:57.06min for the 800 m and 3:59.9min for the 1500 m, but opted to confine only to the 1500 m in Montreal eventually winning the bronze medal behind the winner, Tatyana Kazankina (USSR). Klapezynski again finished behind Kazankina when winning 1500 m silver at the inaugural World Cup in Düsseldorf next year. She then won a title by her own, finishing first over 800 m at the 1978 European Indoor Championships in Milan. Later that year, Bruns set the world record at 1000 m on 18 August at Berlin, clocking 2:31.95min, but lost that record only two days later. She was considerably disappointed after that to finish 7th at both 800 m and 1500 m at the European Championships in Prague. It seemed that her career stagnated after 1500 m fifth-place finishes at the 1980 Moscow Olympics and 1982 European Championships in Athens, but Bruns turned to longer distances in the early 1980s, and although she didn't compete at the 1984 Summer Olympics in Los Angeles, due to the Eastern Bloc boycott, she recorded her lifetime best at 3000 m that year, clocking 8:36.38min in July.

After the Olympics, she visited Zurich to beat star-studded field over 3000 m. She finished third at the 1985 European Cup and then won the gold over 3000 m at the World Cup in Canberra. During 1985, she lowered her one-mile PB to 4:21.59min at the Weltklasse meet, finishing fourth behind Mary Decker's world record of 4:16.70min. Bruns extended her medal haul in 1986, contesting new major distance for women, 10000 m, at the European Championships in Stuttgart and again won the bronze medal in 31:19.76min, losing only to long-distance legends, Ingrid Kristiansen (Norway) and Olga Bondarenko (Soviet Union). Bruns represented East Germany at many European Cup finals, but did not win any until 1987 in Prague where she was victorious at 3000 m. She confirmed her smooth form later that summer at the second World Championships in Rome, taking the bronze in the 3000 m final and winning her final international medal.

She remains one of only few women athletes capable of winning medals at 800 m as well at 10,000 m.

Sporting positions
Preceded by (Soviet Union) Olga Bondarenko	Women's 3.000m Best Year Performance; 1987	Succeeded by (Soviet Union) Tetyana Samolenko
