= Ana Sălăgean =

Romanian athlete

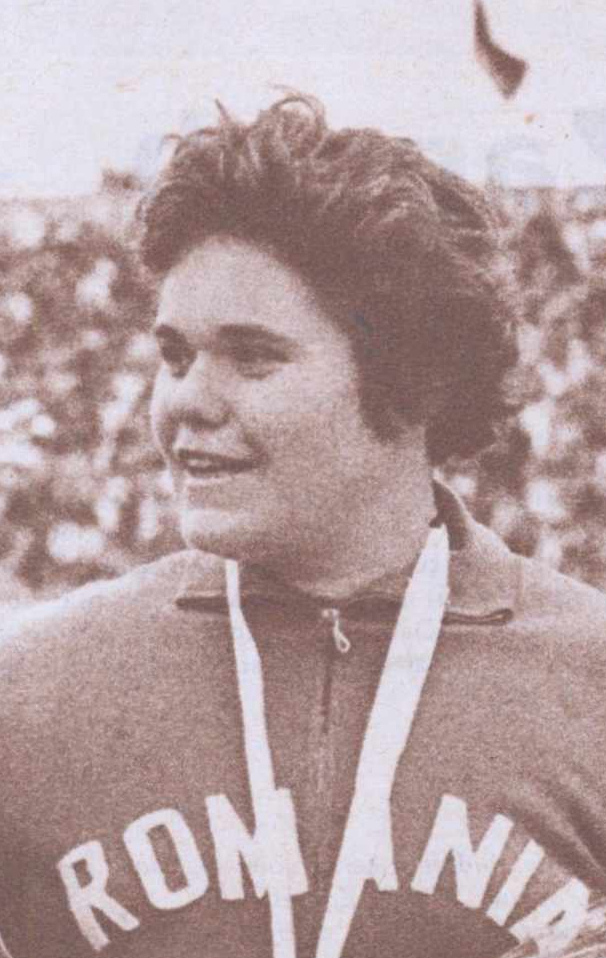
- Sălăgean in 1965

Personal information
- Nationality: Romanian
- Born: 27 March 1937 (age 89) Prejmer, Brașov County, Romania

Sport
- Sport: Athletics
- Event: Shot put
Medal record
Representing Romania
Summer Universiade
Bronze medal – third place	1961 Sofia	Shot put

Ana Maria Sălăgean (née Roth; born 27 March 1937) is a Romanian athlete. She competed in the women's shot put at the 1964 Summer Olympics.
