= Jeff Woodard =

American bobsledder

Personal information
- Born: December 1, 1964 (age 61) Albany, New York, United States

Sport
- Sport: Bobsleigh

Jeff Woodard (born December 1, 1964) is an American bobsledder. He competed at the 1992 Winter Olympics and the 1994 Winter Olympics.
