= Anita Weiß =

German middle-distance runner

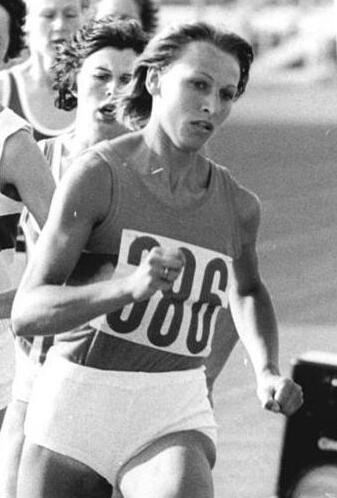
- Weiß in 1979

Medal record

Women's athletics

Representing East Germany

European Indoor Championships
Gold medal – first place	1975 Katowice	800 m
Silver medal – second place	1979 Vienna	800 m

Anita Weiß (née Barkusky; later married Kehl and Marg; born 16 July 1955 in Burow) is a retired East German athlete who specialized in the 800 metres and later also 400 metres hurdles. In the 1976 Olympics she finished fourth in the 800 metres race. As all four of the top finishers in the race broke what had been the world record prior to the 1976 Olympics, Weiß's time was the fourth fastest ever run.

She competed for the sports club SC Neubrandenburg during her active career, becoming East German champion in 1978.

== Achievements ==
Year	Tournament	Venue	Result	Extra
1973	European Junior Championships	Duisburg, West Germany	1st	4 × 400 m relay
1975	European Indoor Championships	Katowice, Poland	1st	800 m
1976	Olympic Games	Montreal, Quebec, Canada	4th	800 m
1978	European Championships	Prague, Czechoslovakia	6th	800 m
1978	European Championships	Prague, Czechoslovakia	6th	400 m hurdles
1979	European Indoor Championships	Vienna, Austria	2nd	800 m
