= Mariana Suman =

Romanian middle-distance runner

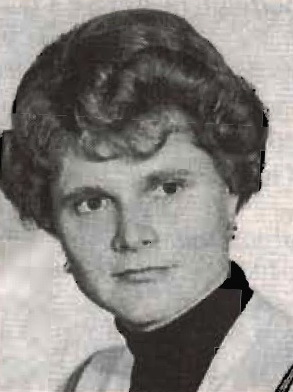

Personal information
- Nationality: Romanian
- Born: 29 July 1951 (age 75)

Sport
- Sport: Middle-distance running
- Event: 800 metres
Medal record
Women's athletics
Representing Romania
European Championships
Bronze medal – third place	1974 Rome	800 m
European Indoor Championships
Bronze medal – third place	1978 Milan	800 m

Mariana Suman, née Mariana Filip, (29 July 1951) is a Romanian middle-distance runner. She competed in the women's 800 metres at the 1976 Summer Olympics.
