= Shi Na =

Chinese racewalker

Shi Na (born February 17, 1981, in Xintai, Shandong) is a Chinese athletics race walker. She represented her country at the 20 km race walk event at the 2008 Summer Olympics.

== Achievements ==
Year	Competition	Venue	Position	Event	Notes
Representing China
1998	World Junior Championships	Annecy, France	9th	5000m	22:28.15
2008	Olympic Games	Beijing, PR China	12th	20 km	1:29:08

== Personal best ==
- 2004 World Cup - 1st team walk
