= Natalia Cercheș =

Moldovan long-distance runner

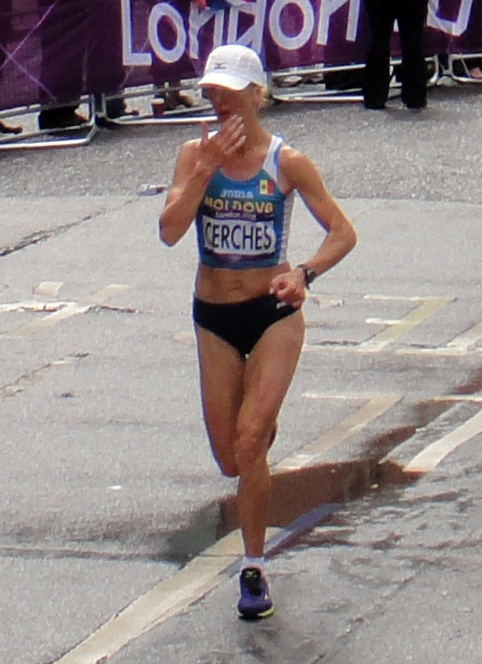

Personal information
- Born: October 3, 1976 (age 50) Chișinău, Moldavian SSR, Soviet Union
- Height: 1.70 m (5 ft 7 in)
- Weight: 55 kg (121 lb)

Sport
- Country: Moldova
- Sport: Athletics
- Event: Marathon
Medal record
Representing Moldova
Summer Universiade
Gold medal – first place	2003 Daegu	10,000m

Natalia Cercheș (born October 3, 1976) is a Moldovan long-distance runner. She competed in the marathon at the 2012 Summer Olympics, placing 65th with a time of 2:37:13. Her personal best at marathon is 2:33:53 set in Linz.
