= Valentina Kharchenko =

Russian discus thrower

Valentina Kharchenko (née Zolotykh; born 1949) is a Russian female former track and field athlete who competed in the discus throw for the Soviet Union. She did not compete at any major international events, but made her name with a performance of 69.86 m (229 ft 2 1/4 in) in Feodosia in 1981. This ranked her third in the world for that season behind East Germany's Evelin Jahl and Bulgarian Mariya Petkova. She ranked in the all-time top five at that point, behind Jahl, Petkova and Soviet record holder Faina Melnik, and as of 2018 this mark continues to rank her in the all-time top 30 female discus throwers. She competed between 1977 and 1982 and was also ranked eleventh in the world for the 1978 and 1982 seasons.
