= 1978 European Athletics Indoor Championships =

- Dates: 11–12 March 1978
- Host city: Milan, Italy
- Venue: Palasport di San Siro
- Events: 19
- Participation: 252 athletes from 25 nations
- Records set: 1 WR, 7 CR

The 1978 European Athletics Indoor Championships were held at Palasport di San Siro in Milan, Italy, between 11 and 12 March 1978. It was the first time the championships were held in Italy.

== Medal summary ==
=== Men ===
Event	Gold		Silver		Bronze	
60 metres	Nikolay Kolesnikov (URS)	6.64	Petar Petrov (BUL)	6.66	Aleksandr Aksinin (URS)	6.73
400 metres	Pietro Mennea (ITA)	46.51	Ryszard Podlas (POL)	46.55	Nikolay Chernetskiy (URS)	46.72
800 metres	Markku Taskinen (FIN)	1:47.35 NR	Olaf Beyer (GDR)	1:47.68	Roger Milhau (FRA)	1:47.8a
1500 metres	Antti Loikkanen (FIN)	3:38.16 CR	Thomas Wessinghage (FRG)	3:38.23	Jürgen Straub (GDR)	3:40.2a
3000 metres	Markus Ryffel (SUI)	7:49.5a	Emiel Puttemans (BEL)	7:49.9a	Jörg Peter (GDR)	7:50.1a
60 metres hurdles	Thomas Munkelt (GDR)	7.62 =CR	Vyacheslav Kulebyakin (URS)	7.72	Giuseppe Buttari (ITA)	7.86
High jump	Vladimir Yashchenko (URS)	2.35 WR	Rolf Beilschmidt (GDR)	2.29	Wolfgang Killing (FRG)	2.27
Pole vault	Tadeusz Ślusarski (POL)	5.45	Vladimir Trofimenko (URS)	5.40	Vladimir Sergiyenko (URS)	5.40
Long jump	László Szalma (HUN)	7.83	Ronald Desruelles (BEL)	7.75	Vladimir Tsepelyov (URS)	7.73
Triple jump	Anatoliy Piskulin (URS)	16.82	Keith Connor (GBR)	16.53	Aleksandr Yakovlev (URS)	16.47
Shot put	Reijo Ståhlberg (FIN)	20.48	Władysław Komar (POL)	20.16	Geoff Capes (GBR)	20.11

=== Women ===
Event	Gold		Silver		Bronze	
60 metres	Marlies Oelsner (GDR)	7.12 CR	Linda Haglund (SWE)	7.18 NR	Lyudmila Storozhkova (URS)	7.27
400 metres	Marina Sidorova (URS)	52.42	Rita Bottiglieri (ITA)	53.18	Karoline Käfer (AUT)	53.56
800 metres	Ulrike Bruns (GDR)	2:02.3a	Totka Petrova (BUL)	2:02.5a	Mariana Suman (ROM)	2:03.4a
1500 metres	Ileana Silai (ROM)	4:07.1a CR	Natalia Mărășescu (ROM)	4:07.4a	Brigitte Kraus (FRG)	4:07.6a
60 metres hurdles	Johanna Klier (GDR)	7.94 CR	Grażyna Rabsztyn (POL)	8.07	Silvia Kempin (FRG)	8.15
High jump	Sara Simeoni (ITA)	1.94 CR	Brigitte Holzapfel (FRG)	1.91	Urszula Kielan (POL)	1.88
Long jump	Jarmila Nygrýnová (TCH)	6.62	Ildikó Erdélyi (HUN)	6.49	Sue Reeve (GBR)	6.48
Shot put	Helena Fibingerová (TCH)	20.67	Margitta Droese (GDR)	19.77	Eva Wilms (FRG)	19.24

== Medal table ==
Rank	Nation	Gold	Silver	Bronze	Total
1	East Germany (GDR)	4	3	2	9
2	Soviet Union (URS)	4	2	6	12
3	Finland (FIN)	3	0	0	3
4	Italy (ITA)	2	1	1	4
5	Czechoslovakia (TCH)	2	0	0	2
6	Poland (POL)	1	3	1	5
7	Romania (ROU)	1	1	1	3
8	Hungary (HUN)	1	1	0	2
9	Switzerland (SUI)	1	0	0	1
10	West Germany (FRG)	0	2	4	6
11	Belgium (BEL)	0	2	0	2
11	Bulgaria (BUL)	0	2	0	2
13	Great Britain (GBR)	0	1	2	3
14	Sweden (SWE)	0	1	0	1
15	Austria (AUT)	0	0	1	1
15	France (FRA)	0	0	1	1
Totals (16 entries)		19	19	19	57

== Participating nations ==
- Austria (4)
- Belgium (6)
- Bulgaria (13)
- Czechoslovakia (11)
- East Germany (14)
- Finland (10)
- France (18)
- Great Britain (10)
- Greece (2)
- Hungary (8)
- Iceland (3)
- Italy (29)
- Liechtenstein (1)
- Netherlands (7)
- Norway (2)
- Poland (22)
- Portugal (1)
- Romania (6)
- Soviet Union (31)
- Spain (7)
- Sweden (6)
- Switzerland (6)
- Turkey (3)
- West Germany (26)
- Yugoslavia (6)
