= Natalia Mărășescu =

Romanian middle-distance runner

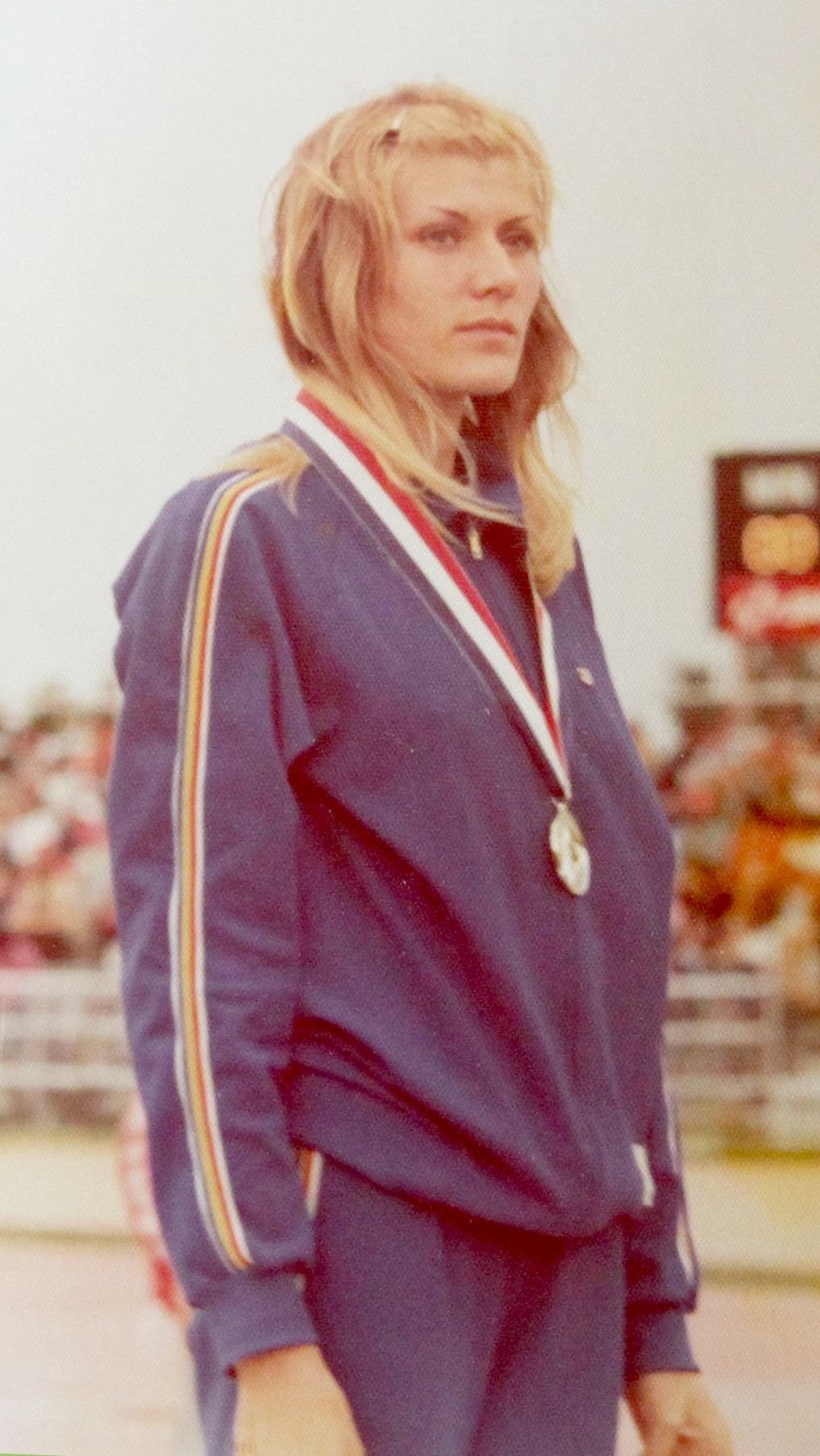

Personal information
- Born: 3 October 1952 (age 73) Căpreni, Romania
- Height: 166 cm (5 ft 5 in)
- Weight: 52 kg (115 lb)

Sport
- Sport: Athletics
- Events: 1500 m, 3000 m

Achievements and titles
- Personal bests: 1500 m – 3:58.2 (1979); 3000 m – 8:33.53 (1978)
Medal record
Women's athletics
Representing Romania
European Championships
Silver medal – second place	1978 Prague	1500 m
Silver medal – second place	1978 Prague	3000 m
European Indoor Championships
Gold medal – first place	1975 Katowice	1500 m
Gold medal – first place	1979 Vienna	1500 m
Silver medal – second place	1976 Munich	1500 m
Silver medal – second place	1978 Milan	1500 m
Summer Universiade
Gold medal – first place	1975 Rome	3000 m
Gold medal – first place	1979 Mexico City	1500 m
Silver medal – second place	1975 Rome	1500 m
Silver medal – second place	1977 Sofia	1500 m

Natalia Mărăşescu, née Natalia Andrei, (born 3 October 1952) is a retired Romanian middle-distance runner who specialized mainly in the 1500 metres. She competed in this event at the 1976 and 1980 Olympics and placed ninth in 1980.

== Biography ==
Mărăşescu set two world records over the mile; 4:23.8 minutes on 21 May 1977 in Bucharest, and 4:22.09 minutes on 27 January 1979 in Auckland. The record was broken by Mary Slaney won ran in 4:21.68 minutes a year later in the same city. The current record is 4:12.33. She briefly held the record in the 5000 metres, with 15:41.4 minutes. This record lasted less than four months before being broken by Jan Merrill.

== Doping ban ==
Mărăşescu was banned 18 months for taking anabolic steroids in 1979. After 8 months Mărăşescu was reinstated after IAAF President Adriaan Paulen of the Netherlands said that an 18-month suspension in the steroid case would have kept the women out of the Moscow Olympics, which would have constituted "an extra penalty." He said that the IAAF Council had therefore reinstated them for "humane reasons."

Records
Preceded by Paola Pigni	Women's mile world record holder 21 May 1977 – 26 January 1980	Succeeded by Mary Decker
