= Gisela Ellenberger =

German middle-distance runner

Personal information
- Nationality: German
- Born: 12 July 1950 (age 76)

Sport
- Sport: Middle-distance running
- Event: 800 metres
Medal record
Women's athletics
Representing West Germany
European Indoor Championships
Gold medal – first place	1973 Rotterdam	4×340 m
Silver medal – second place	1971 Sofia	4×400 m
Silver medal – second place	1974 Gothenburg	800 m
Bronze medal – third place	1976 Munich	800 m

Gisela Ellenberger (born 12 July 1950) is a German middle-distance runner. She competed in the women's 800 metres at the 1972 Summer Olympics.
