= Violeta Tsvetkova =

Bulgarian middle-distance runner

Personal information
- Born: 29 July 1955 (age 70)

Sport
- Sport: Track and field

Violeta Tsvetkova (Bulgarian: Виолета Цветкова, born 29 July 1955) is a retired Bulgarian middle-distance runner who specialized in the 800 metres.

She finished sixth at the 1979 European Indoor Championships, and fifth at the 1980 European Indoor Championships,

Her personal best time was 2:01.07 minutes, achieved in June 1980 in Warsaw.
