= Marie-Françoise Dubois =

French middle-distance runner

Personal information
- Nationality: French
- Born: 25 March 1948 (age 77) Lille
- Years active: 1970s
- Height: 1.66 m (5 ft 5 in)

Sport
- Event: middle distance running

Marie-Françoise Dubois (born Fourcroy on 25 March 1948 at Lille) is a former French athlete, who specialized in middle-distance running.

== Biography ==
She won three Outdoor Athletic Championships: the 400 m in 1975, the 800 m in 1977 and the 1 500 m in 1974. She also won three French Indoor Athletic Championship titles in the 800 m.

She improved three times the French 800m record and also improved four times the record for the 1,500 m. In the 800 m, she was the first French female athlete to dip under two minutes (1:59.9 in 1974 in Rome). She also established other records for France in the 1,000 m and for the 4 × 800 m Relay.

She finished fourth in the 800 m during the 1974 European Athletics Championships in Rome.

== Prize list ==
=== National ===
- French Championships in Athletics :
  - winner of the 400m 1975
  - winner of the 800m 1977
  - winner of 1500 m 1974

== Records ==
Personal Bests
| Event | Performance | Location | Date |
|---|---|---|---|
| 800 m | 1:59.87 | | 1974 |
| 1 500 m | 4:08.6 | | 1975 |

== Notes and references ==
L'Equipe : Edition of one of the last days of 1974 Panorama French athletics in 1974 titled III. - Feminine : The advent of Marie-Françoise Dubois

- Siukonen, Markku & Ahola, Matti (1990), Sporttikustannus Oy (ed.), Suuri EM-kirja, p. 123, ISBN 951-8920-11-7
- Fédération Française d'Athlétisme, ed. (2003), Docathlé 2003, pp. 40, 176, 214, 404, ISBN 2-9512343-3-3
