= Lilyana Tomova =

Bulgarian sprinter and middle-distance runner

Personal information
- Born: 9 August 1946 (age 79) Plovdiv, Bulgaria

Sport
- Sport: Track and field
Medal record
Representing Bulgaria
European Championships
Gold medal – first place	1974 Rome	800 m
Silver medal – second place	1974 Rome	1500 m
European Indoor Championships
Silver medal – second place	1974 Gothenburg	4 × 392 m relay
Silver medal – second place	1976 Munich	800 m
Summer Universiade
Gold medal – first place	1973 Moscow	800 m

Lilyana Tomova-Todorova (Bulgarian: Лиляна Томова-Тодорова), born Lilyana Todorova, 9 August 1946) is a retired Bulgarian sprinter and middle-distance runner who specialized in the 400, 800 and 1500 metres.

Lilyana was born in Plovdiv, and represented the club Trakiya Plovdiv. She won a silver medal in a 4 × 392 metres relay race at the 1974 European Indoor Championships. She also reached the final of the 800 metres event, but did not finish the race. At the 1974 European Championships in the summer she won the gold medal in the 800 metres and silver in the 1500 metres. In winning gold she beat the reigning Olympic 800 metres bronze medallist Gunhild Hoffmeister by 0.67 seconds, but Hoffmeister won the 1500 metres.

Tomova-Todorova continued to win the silver medal in the 800 metres at the 1976 European Indoor Championships. She competed once at the Olympic Games, in 1976. Here she finished second in her initial 800 metres heat, but was knocked out in the semi-finals. She also competed in the 4 × 400 metres relay, but the team did not progress past the first round.

In winning an 800 metres medal at the 1976 European Indoor Championships, she was a part of a strong tradition of Bulgarian 800 metres runners, who won medals at the European Indoor Championships in 1972, 1973, 1975, 1976, 1977, 1978 and 1979. Other than Tomova-Todorova, these medals were taken by Svetla Zlateva, Stefka Yordanova, Rositsa Pekhlivanova, Nikolina Shtereva and Totka Petrova.

She became Bulgarian 400 metres champion in 1967, 1968, 1969, 1972 and 1973 as well as 800 metres champion in 1972. She became Bulgarian indoor champion in the 400 metres in 1970 and 1976.

Her personal best in the 400 metres was 51.99 seconds, achieved in August 1973 in Athens. Her personal bests in the 800 and 1500 metres were both achieved in the finals of the 1974 European Championships in Rome: 1:58.14 minutes in the 800 metres and 4:05.0 minutes in the 1500 metres. She also had 2:36.4 minutes in the 1000 metres, achieved in July 1976 in Sofia.
