= Totka Petrova =

Bulgarian middle-distance runner

Personal information
- Born: 17 December 1956 (age 69) Yambol, Bulgaria

Sport
- Sport: Track and field
Medal record
Representing Bulgaria
European Championships
Bronze medal – third place	1978 Prague	1500 m
European Indoor Championships
Silver medal – second place	1977 San Sebastián	800 m
Silver medal – second place	1978 Milan	800 m
IAAF World Cup
Gold medal – first place	1977 Düsseldorf	800 m
Summer Universiade
Gold medal – first place	1977 Sofia	800 m
Gold medal – first place	1977 Sofia	1500 m

Totka Nikolaeva Petrova (Bulgarian: Тотка Петрова, born 17 December 1956) is a retired female middle-distance runner who represented Bulgaria in the 1970s and the early 1980s. She specialized in the 800 and 1500 metres, and won numerous international medals. She was named both the Bulgarian Sportsperson of the Year and the BTA Best Balkan Athlete of the Year in 1977. She is still the Bulgarian 1500 metres record holder.

== Career ==
She was born in Yambol, and represented the club Tundzha Yambol. She won silver medals at the 1977 and 1978 European Indoor Championships. In 1977 she was only 0.05 seconds behind the gold medallist Jane Colebrook. Also, she continued a strong tradition of Bulgarian 800 metres runners, who had taken medals at the previous European Indoor Championships in 1972, 1973, 1975 and 1976. Other than Petrova, these medals were taken by Svetla Zlateva, Stefka Yordanova, Rositsa Pekhlivanova, Nikolina Shtereva and Lilyana Tomova.

In 1977 she also won the gold medal at the 1977 World Cup, and at the 1977 Summer Universiade she won gold medals in both 800 and 1500 metres. In 1978 she participated at the European Championships, finishing fourth in the 800 metres and winning the bronze medal in the 1500 metres.

In August 1979 Petrova tested positive for anabolic steroids and was subsequently banned from sport for 8 months.

At the 1980 Olympic Games she reached the semi-final of the 800 metres and only the heats of the 1500 metres event. In 1982 she finished ninth in the 1500 metres at the European Indoor Championships, and competed at the 1982 European Championships without reaching the final. At the 1983 World Championships she reached the semi-final of the 800 metres event, where she was knocked out. She was also knocked out in the 1500 metres event, in the heats.

She became Bulgarian indoor champion in the 800 metres in 1977 and 1978. As indoor champion she was both preceded and succeeded by Nikolina Shtereva. She also became Bulgarian indoor champion in the 1500 metres in 1983. Strong rivals in this event include Rumyana Chavdarova and Vania Gospodinova. Outdoors, she became Bulgarian 400 metres champion in 1978, 800 metres champion in 1977, 1978 and 1983, and 1500 metres champion in 1977, 1979 and 1983.

Her personal bests in her main events were 1.56.2 minutes in the 800 metres, achieved in July 1979 in Paris, and 3.57.4 minutes in the 1500 metres, achieved in August 1979 in Athens. She still holds the Bulgarian record in 1500 metres. With automatic timing she had 1.56.59 minutes in the 800 metres, achieved in August 1978 in Prague. She also had 51.82 seconds in the 400 metres and 2.33.0 minutes in the 1000 metres, both achieved in August 1978 in Sofia.
