= Ivanka Bonova =

Bulgarian athletics competitor

Ivanka Bonova (Bulgarian: Иванка Бонова, born 4 April 1949) is a retired Bulgarian sprinter and middle-distance runner who specialized in the women's 400 and 800 metres.

She was born in Raduil, and represented the clubs Balkan and Levski-Spartak Club. In the 800 metres she finished fourth at the 1976 European Indoor Championships and seventh at the 1979 European Indoor Championships. She also competed at the 1976 Summer Olympics in the 4 x 400 metres relay, but the Bulgarian team failed to progress past round one.

Her personal best time was 1:59.7 minutes, achieved in July 1980 in Sofia. She had 53.54 seconds in the 400 metres, achieved in 1980.
