= Fița Lovin =

Romanian middle-distance runner

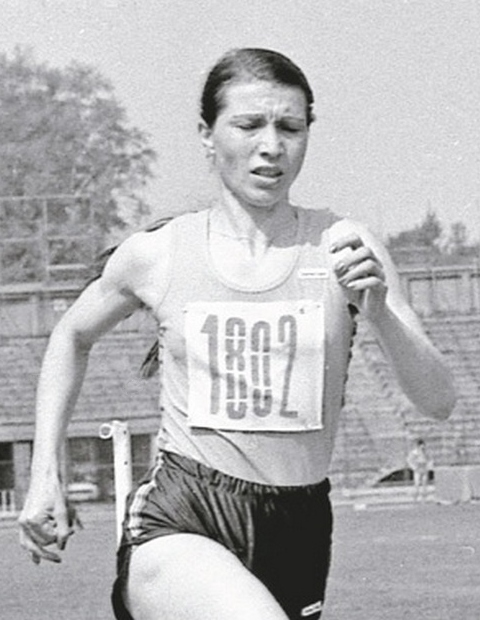

Personal information
- Born: 14 January 1951 (age 75) Braniștea, Galați, Romania
- Height: 166 cm (5 ft 5 in)
- Weight: 57 kg (126 lb)

Sport
- Sport: Athletics
- Event(s): 800 m, 1500 m

Achievements and titles
- Personal best(s): 800 m – 1:56.67 (1980); 1500 m – 4:00.12 (1983)
Medal record
Representing Romania
Olympic Games
Bronze medal – third place	1984 Los Angeles	800 metres
World Cross Country Championships
Silver medal – second place	1982 Rome	4.663 km
World Indoor Games
Silver medal – second place	1985 Paris	1500 m
European Athletics Indoor Championships
Bronze medal – third place	1979 Vienna	800 m
Gold medal – first place	1984 Gothenburg	1500 m
Silver medal – second place	1985 Piraeus	1500 m
Summer Universiade
Bronze medal – third place	1979 Mexico City	800 m

Fița Lovin, née Fita Rafira (14 January 1951) is a retired middle-distance runner from Romania. She competed at the 1980 and 1984 Olympics and won the bronze medal in 800 metres in 1984, behind compatriot Doina Melinte and America's Kim Gallagher. She also won the European 1,500 m indoor title in 1984 and a silver medal at the 1982 IAAF World Cross Country Championships, placing fourth in 1985.
