= Anne-Marie Van Nuffel =

Belgian middle-distance runner

Personal information
- Nationality: Belgian
- Born: 22 May 1956 (age 70)

Sport
- Sport: Sprinting
- Event(s): 800 m, 1500 m
Medal record
Women's athletics
Representing Belgium
European Indoor Championships
Silver medal – second place	1980 Sindelfingen	800 m

Anne-Marie Van Nuffel (born 22 May 1956) is a Belgian middle-distance runner. She competed in the women's 4 × 400 metres relay at the 1976 Summer Olympics.
