= Athletics at the 1972 Summer Olympics – Women's 1500 metres =

Women's 1500 metres at the Games of the XX Olympiad
- Venue: Olympic Stadium, Munich, West Germany
- Date: 4 September 1972 7 & 9 September 1972
- Competitors: 36 from 21 nations
- Winning time: 4:01.36 WR

Medalists
1st place, gold medalist(s)		Lyudmila Bragina; Soviet Union
2nd place, silver medalist(s)		Gunhild Hoffmeister; East Germany
3rd place, bronze medalist(s)		Paola Pigni; Italy

These are the official results of the Women's 1500 metres event at the 1972 Summer Olympics in Munich. The competition was held on 4 of September & 9 of September. This was the first time this distance was held for women at the Olympics.

Lyudmila Bragina had just set the world record a month and a half earlier, knocking two and a half seconds off of Karin Burneleit's previous record. Burneleit was in the field, as were previous record holders Jaroslava Jehličková and Paola Pigni. In the first heat, Bragina improved upon her world record by .4. A step behind her, seventeen year old Glenda Reiser set the world junior record, also running faster than the world record at the start of that race. Reiser's time would also qualify as the World Youth Best.

In the first semi final, Reiser was not so lucky, not only did she not run as fast, but she didn't qualify for the final. In the second semi final, Bragina again improved the world record by almost a second and a half, while Jehličková was eliminated.

In the final, Berny Boxem was the early leader, while Bragina languished in last place. After the first 600 metres, Bragina decided to change that, moving to the outside and running past the field at a quicker tempo. Only long striding Berny Boxem was able to go with her as Bragina opened up a 10-metre lead on the field. After another 300 metres, Boxem began to fade and was quickly swallowed up by the front of the pack led by Sheila Carey. At the bell Ellen Tittel dropped out, collapsing onto the high jump apron while Bragina continued to expand her lead. Gunhild Hoffmeister moved past Carey into second place but they all were losing ground to Bragina. Several places back, Pigni launched into her kick, passing Burneleit, Keizer, Carey and almost catching Hoffmeister. But Hoffmeister noticed and defended her position, battling to stay ahead. Twice on the home stretch, with her arms flailing, Pigni looked to draw even with Hoffmeister, but each time Hoffmeister edged ahead to take the silver medal. Not only did Bragina set a third consecutive world record, but the next four competitors behind her beat her world record from two days earlier. Even sixth place Keizer was only .06 behind the previous record, at a time when records were only accurate to .1 of a second.

In total, eight women ran times in Munich faster than the pre-Olympic world record.

== Heats ==
The top four runners in each heat (blue) and the next two fastest (pink), advanced to the semifinal round.

=== Heat one ===
Rank	Athlete	Nation	Time	Notes
1	Lyudmila Bragina	Soviet Union	4:06.47	WR
2	Glenda Reiser	Canada	4:06.71	WJR
3	Ilja Keizer	Netherlands	4:08.00	
4	Jenny Orr	Australia	4:08.06	
5	Jaroslava Jehličková	Czechoslovakia	4:08.39	
6	Christa Merten	West Germany	4:12.60	
7	Joan Allison	Great Britain	4:14.89	
8	Marijke Moser	Switzerland	4:24.94	
9	Lee Chiu-Hsia	Republic of China	4:37.15	

=== Heat two ===
Rank	Athlete	Nation	Time
1	Paola Pigni	Italy	4:09.53
2	Vasilena Amzina	Bulgaria	4:12.85
3	Berny Boxem	Netherlands	4:13.83
4	Francie Kraker	United States	4:14.73
5	Thelma Wright	Canada	4:15.43
6	Grete Andersen	Norway	4:16.00
7	Sára Szenteleki-Ligetkuti	Hungary	4:16.08
8	Gerda Ranz	West Germany	4:18.60
9	Vera Nikolić	Yugoslavia	4:23.36
-	Arda Kalpakian	Lebanon	DNS

=== Heat three ===
Rank	Athlete	Nation	Time
1	Tamara Pangelova	Soviet Union	4:10.75
2	Karin Burneleit	East Germany	4:10.83
3	Francie Larrieu	United States	4:11.18
4	Joyce Smith	Great Britain	4:11.27
5	Inger Knutsson	Sweden	4:11.32
6	Mary Tracey	Ireland	4:16.43
7	Sinikka Tyynelä	Finland	4:21.40
8	Emesia Chizunga	Malawi	4:41.47
-	Magdolna Kulcsár	Hungary	DNF

=== Heat four ===
Rank	Athlete	Nation	Time
1	Ellen Tittel	West Germany	4:12.12
2	Gunhild Hoffmeister	East Germany	4:12.80
3	Sheila Carey	Great Britain	4:13.01
4	Wenche Sørum	Norway	4:14.10
5	Tonka Petrova	Bulgaria	4:14.95
6	Anne-Marie Nenzell	Sweden	4:16.67
7	Margrit Hess	Switzerland	4:19.67
8	Tamara Kazachkova	Soviet Union	4:20.15
9	Chereno Maiyo	Kenya	4:20.9
-	Doris Brown	United States	DNS

== Semifinals ==
The top four runners in each heat (blue) and the next two fastest (pink), advanced to the final round.

=== Heat one ===
Rank	Athlete	Nation	Time
1	Tamara Pangelova	Soviet Union	4:07.66
2	Paola Pigni	Italy	4:07.83
3	Gunhild Hoffmeister	East Germany	4:07.94
4	Ilja Keizer	Netherlands	4:08.25
5	Vasilena Amzina	Bulgaria	4:09.12
6	Joyce Smith	Great Britain	4:09.37
7	Glenda Reiser	Canada	4:09.51
8	Francie Kraker	United States	4:12.76
9	Inger Knutsson	Sweden	4:14.97

=== Heat two ===
Rank	Athlete	Nation	Time	Notes
1	Lyudmila Bragina	Soviet Union	4:05.07	WR
2	Karin Burneleit	East Germany	4:05.78	
3	Ellen Tittel	West Germany	4:06.65	
4	Sheila Carey	Great Britain	4:07.41	
5	Berny Boxem	Netherlands	4:08.81	
6	Jenny Orr	Australia	4:08.86	
7	Wenche Sørum	Norway	4:09.70	
8	Francie Larrieu	United States	4:15.26	
9	Jaroslava Jehličková	Czechoslovakia	4:18.16	

== Final ==
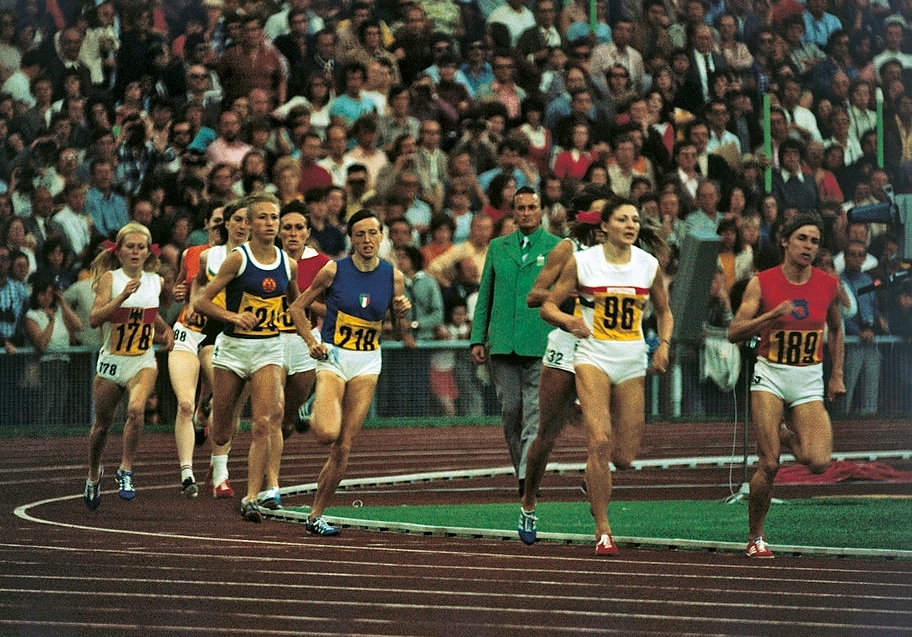
Nine participants of the 1500 final. Bragina is leading and is not seen in the image. She is followed by Keizer, Carey and Hoffmeister.

Rank	Athlete	Nation	Time	Notes
1st place, gold medalist(s)	Lyudmila Bragina	Soviet Union	4:01.38	WR
2nd place, silver medalist(s)	Gunhild Hoffmeister	East Germany	4:02.83	
3rd place, bronze medalist(s)	Paola Pigni	Italy	4:02.85	
4	Karin Burneleit	East Germany	4:04.11	
5	Sheila Carey	Great Britain	4:04.81	
6	Ilja Keizer	Netherlands	4:05.13	
7	Tamara Pangelova	Soviet Union	4:06.45	
8	Jenny Orr	Australia	4:12.15	
9	Berny Boxem	Netherlands	4:13.10	
-	Ellen Tittel	West Germany	DNF	

Key: WR = world record; OR = Olympic record; DNS = did not start; DNF = did not finish
