= 1971 European Athletics Championships – Women's 800 metres =

Women's 800 metres at the European Athletics Championships

The women's 800 metres at the 1971 European Athletics Championships was held in Helsinki, Finland, at Helsinki Olympic Stadium on 10, 11, and 12 August 1971.

== Medalists ==
Gold	Vera Nikolić; Yugoslavia
Silver	Patricia Lowe; Great Britain
Bronze	Rosemary Stirling; Great Britain

== Results ==
=== Final ===
12 August

Rank	Name	Nationality	Time	Notes
1st place, gold medalist(s)	Vera Nikolić	Yugoslavia	2:00.00	NR CR
2nd place, silver medalist(s)	Patricia Lowe	Great Britain	2:01.66	
3rd place, bronze medalist(s)	Rosemary Stirling	Great Britain	2:02.08	
4	Danuta Wierzbowska	Poland	2:04.16	
5	Gisela Ellenberger	West Germany	2:05.14	
6	Claire Walsh	Ireland	2:08.57	
	Hildegard Falck	West Germany	DNF	
	Gunhild Hoffmeister	East Germany	DNF	

=== Semi-finals ===
11 August

==== Semi-final 1 ====
Rank	Name	Nationality	Time	Notes
1	Vera Nikolić	Yugoslavia	2:03.7	Q
2	Danuta Wierzbowska	Poland	2:05.3	Q
3	Gisela Ellenberger	West Germany	2:05.4	Q
4	Patricia Lowe	Great Britain	2:05.4	Q
5	Magdolna Kulcsár	Hungary	2:06.2	
6	Waltraud Pöhland	East Germany	2:06.9	
7	Angela Ramello	Italy	2:07.5	
8	Kirsten Hoiler	Denmark	2:07.6	

==== Semi-final 2 ====
Rank	Name	Nationality	Time	Notes
1	Gunhild Hoffmeister	East Germany	2:03.1	Q
2	Hildegard Falck	West Germany	2:03.2	Q
3	Rosemary Stirling	Great Britain	2:03.3	Q
4	Claire Walsh	Ireland	2:03.4	NR Q
5	Ileana Silai	Romania	2:03.9	
6	Sylvia Schenk	West Germany	2:04.6	
7	Donata Govoni	Italy	2:05.0	
	Nijolė Sabaitė	Soviet Union	DNS	

=== Heats ===
10 August

==== Heat 1 ====
Rank	Name	Nationality	Time	Notes
1	Hildegard Falck	West Germany	2:04.96	Q
2	Magdolna Kulcsár	Hungary	2:05.30	Q
3	Waltraud Pöhland	East Germany	2:05.31	Q
4	Angela Ramello	Italy	2:05.70	Q
5	Vasilena Amzina	Bulgaria	2:06.39	
6	Sandra Sutherland	Great Britain	2:09.46	

==== Heat 2 ====
Rank	Name	Nationality	Time	Notes
1	Vera Nikolić	Yugoslavia	2:04.81	Q
2	Rosemary Stirling	Great Britain	2:06.74	Q
3	Sylvia Schenk	West Germany	2:07.41	Q
4	Danuta Wierzbowska	Poland	2:07.93	Q
5	Birgitte Jennes	Denmark	2:09.54	
6	Maria-Coro Fuentes	Spain	2:12.58	

==== Heat 3 ====
Rank	Name	Nationality	Time	Notes
1	Gunhild Hoffmeister	East Germany	2:05.87	Q
2	Claire Walsh	Ireland	2:06.06	Q
3	Patricia Lowe	Great Britain	2:06.37	Q
4	Kirsten Hoiler	Denmark	2:06.67	Q
5	Elżbieta Skowrońska	Poland	2:06.94	

==== Heat 4 ====
Rank	Name	Nationality	Time	Notes
1	Ileana Silai	Romania	2:04.88	Q
2	Donata Govoni	Italy	2:05.48	Q
3	Nijolė Sabaitė	Soviet Union	2:05.54	Q
4	Gisela Ellenberger	West Germany	2:05.57	Q
5	Tonka Petrova	Bulgaria	2:05.91	
6	Grete Andersen	Norway	2:07.63	

== Participation ==
According to an unofficial count, 23 athletes from 14 countries participated in the event.

- Bulgaria (2)
- Denmark (2)
- East Germany (2)
- Hungary (1)
- Ireland (1)
- Italy (2)
- Norway (1)
- Poland (2)
- Romania (1)
- Soviet Union (1)
- Spain (1)
- Great Britain (3)
- West Germany (3)
- Yugoslavia (1)
