= 1974 European Athletics Championships – Women's 1500 metres =

Women's 1500 metres at the European Athletics Championships

The women's 1500 metres at the 1974 European Athletics Championships was held in Rome, Italy, at Stadio Olimpico on 6 and 8 September 1974.

== Medalists ==
Gold	Gunhild Hoffmeister; East Germany
Silver	Lilyana Todorova; Bulgaria
Bronze	Grete Andersen; Norway

== Results ==
=== Final ===
8 September

Rank	Name	Nationality	Time	Notes
1st place, gold medalist(s)	Gunhild Hoffmeister	East Germany	4:02.25	CR NR
2nd place, silver medalist(s)	Lilyana Todorova	Bulgaria	4:04.97	NR
3rd place, bronze medalist(s)	Grete Andersen	Norway	4:05.21	NR
4	Tatyana Kazankina	Soviet Union	4:05.94	
5	Tamara Pangelova	Soviet Union	4:09.93	
6	Ulrike Klapezynski	East Germany	4:10.54	
7	Carmen Valero	Spain	4:11.61	NJR NR
8	Joyce Smith	Great Britain	4:12.26	
9	Gabriella Dorio	Italy	4:12.7	
10	Ellen Wellmann	West Germany	4:16.3	
11	Gunilla Lindh	Sweden	4:17.5	
	Karin Burneleit	East Germany	DNS	

=== Heats ===
6 September

==== Heat 1 ====
Rank	Name	Nationality	Time	Notes
1	Gunhild Hoffmeister	East Germany	4:11.7	Q
2	Gabriella Dorio	Italy	4:12.1	Q
3	Tamara Pangelova	Soviet Union	4:12.8	Q
4	Natalia Mărăşescu	Romania	4:14.1	
5	Rumyana Chavdarova	Bulgaria	4:15.1	
6	Czesława Surdel	Poland	4:18.7	
7	Wenche Sorum	Norway	4:19.3	
8	Loa Olafsson	Denmark	4:28.0	
9	Sylvia Schenk	West Germany	4:30.1	

==== Heat 2 ====
Rank	Name	Nationality	Time	Notes
1	Tatyana Kazankina	Soviet Union	4:11.4	Q
2	Lilyana Todorova	Bulgaria	4:11.5	Q
3	Ellen Wellmann	West Germany	4:11.5	Q
4	Gunilla Lindh	Sweden	4:11.5	q
5	Ulrike Klapezynski	East Germany	4:11.7	q
6	Carmen Valero	Spain	4:13.0	NR q
7	Sonja Castelein	Belgium	4:13.2	NR
8	Nina Holmén	Finland	4:14.6	
	Paola Cacchi-Pigni	Italy	DNS	

==== Heat 3 ====
Rank	Name	Nationality	Time	Notes
1	Grete Andersen	Norway	4:11.5	Q
2	Joyce Smith	Great Britain	4:12.0	Q
3	Karin Burneleit	East Germany	4:13.2	Q
4	Nikolina Shtereva	Bulgaria	4:14.7	
5	Mary Purcell	Ireland	4:15.1	NR
6	Lyudmila Bragina	Soviet Union	4:17.8	
7	Silvana Cruciata	Italy	4:22.6	
	Marie-Françoise Dubois	France	DNS	
	Ileana Silai	Romania	DNS	

== Participation ==
According to an unofficial count, 24 athletes from 15 countries participated in the event.

- Belgium (1)
- Bulgaria (3)
- Denmark (1)
- East Germany (3)
- Finland (1)
- Ireland (1)
- Italy (2)
- Norway (2)
- Poland (1)
- Romania (1)
- Soviet Union (3)
- Spain (1)
- Sweden (1)
- Great Britain (1)
- West Germany (2)
