= 1500 metres world record progression =

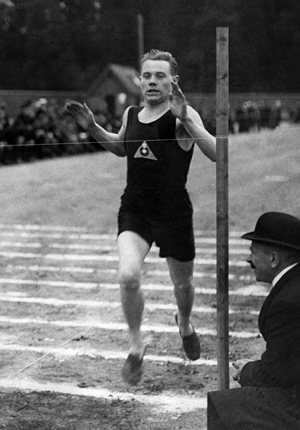
Paavo Nurmi breaks the 1,500 m world record in Helsinki in 1924.

The 1500-metre run became a standard racing distance in Europe in the late 19th century, perhaps as a metric version of the mile, a popular running distance since at least the 1850s in English-speaking countries.

A distance of 1500m sometimes is called the "metric mile". The French had the first important races over the distance, holding their initial championship in 1888.

When the Olympic Games were revived in 1896, metric distances were run, including the 1500; however, most of the best milers in the world were absent, and the winning time of 4:33 1/5 by Australian Edwin Flack was 17 4/5 seconds slower than the amateur mile record, despite the fact one mile is 109.344 metres longer than 1500 metres.

The 1900 Olympics and 1904 Olympics showed improvements in times run, but it was not until the 1908 Olympics that a meeting of the top milers over the distance took place, and not until the 1912 Olympics that a true world-class race over the distance was run.

The distance has now largely replaced the mile in major track meets.

== Men (outdoors) ==
=== Pre-IAAF ===
Time	Athlete	Date	Place
4:24 3/5	J. Borel (FRA)	1892	
4:21	Fernand Meiers (FRA)	1893-05-28	Paris, France
4:19 4/5	Felix Bourdier (FRA)	1894-07-22	Paris, France
4:18 2/5	Albin Lermusiaux (FRA)	1895-05-12	Paris, France
4:16 4/5	Michel Soalhat (FRA)	1895-05-26	Paris, France
4:15 3/5	Thomas Conneff (USA)	1895-08-26	New York City, United States
4:10 2/5	Albin Lermusiaux (FRA)	1896-06-26	Paris, France
4:09	John Bray (USA)	1900-05-30	Bayonne, France
4:06 1/5	Charles Bennett (GBR)	1900-07-15	Paris, France
4:05 2/5	James Lightbody (USA)	1904-09-03	St. Louis, United States
3:59 4/5	Harold Wilson (GBR)	1908-05-30	London, Great Britain
3:59 1/5	Abel Kiviat (USA)	1912-05-26	New York City, United States
3:56 4/5	Abel Kiviat (USA)	1912-06-01	New York City, United States

=== IAAF era ===
The first world record in the 1500m for men (athletics) was recognized by the International Amateur Athletics Federation, now known as World Athletics, in 1912. To July 17, 2015, the IAAF has ratified 38 world records in the event.

Ratified
Not ratified
Ratified but later rescinded
Pending ratification

Time	Auto	Athlete	Date	Place
3:55.8		Abel Kiviat (USA)	1912-06-08	Cambridge, United States
3:54.7		John Zander (SWE)	1917-08-05	Stockholm, Sweden
3:52.6		Paavo Nurmi (FIN)	1924-06-19	Helsinki, Finland
3:51.0		Otto Peltzer (GER)	1926-09-11	Berlin, Germany
3:49.2		Jules Ladoumegue (FRA)	1930-10-05	Paris, France
3:49.2		Luigi Beccali (ITA)	1933-09-09	Turin, Italy
3:49.0		Luigi Beccali (ITA)	1933-09-17	Milan, Italy
3:48.8		Bill Bonthron (USA)	1934-06-30	Milwaukee, United States
3:47.8		Jack Lovelock (NZL)	1936-08-06	Berlin, Germany
3:47.6		Gunder Hägg (SWE)	1941-08-10	Stockholm, Sweden
3:45.8		Gunder Hägg (SWE)	1942-07-17	Stockholm, Sweden
3:45.0		Arne Andersson (SWE)	1943-08-17	Gothenburg, Sweden
3:43.0		Gunder Hägg (SWE)	1944-07-07	Gothenburg, Sweden
3:43.0		Lennart Strand (SWE)	1947-07-15	Malmö, Sweden
3:43.0		Werner Lueg (FRG)	1952-06-29	Berlin, Germany
3:42.8+		Wes Santee (USA)	1954-06-04	Compton, United States
3:41.8+		John Landy (AUS)	1954-06-21	Turku, Finland
3:40.8		Sándor Iharos (HUN)	1955-07-28	Helsinki, Finland
3:40.8		László Tábori (HUN)	1955-09-06	Oslo, Norway
3:40.8		Gunnar Nielsen (DEN)	1955-09-06	Oslo, Norway
3:40.6		István Rózsavölgyi (HUN)	1956-08-03	Tata, Hungary
3:40.2		Olavi Salsola (FIN)	1957-07-11	Turku, Finland
3:38.1		Stanislav Jungwirth (TCH)	1957-07-12	Stará Boleslav, Czechoslovakia
3:36.0		Herb Elliott (AUS)	1958-08-28	Gothenburg, Sweden
3:35.6		Herb Elliott (AUS)	1960-09-06	Rome, Italy
3:33.1		Jim Ryun (USA)	1967-07-08	Los Angeles, United States
3:32.2	3:32.16	Filbert Bayi (TAN)	1974-02-02	Christchurch, New Zealand
3:32.1	3:32.03	Sebastian Coe (GBR)	1979-08-15	Zürich, Switzerland
3:32.1	3:32.09	Steve Ovett (GBR)	1980-07-15	Oslo, Norway
3:31.4	3:31.36	Steve Ovett (GBR)	1980-08-27	Koblenz, West Germany
3:31.24		Sydney Maree (USA)	1983-08-28	Cologne, West Germany
3:30.77		Steve Ovett (GBR)	1983-09-04	Rieti, Italy
3:29.67		Steve Cram (GBR)	1985-07-16	Nice, France
3:29.46		Saïd Aouita (MAR)	1985-08-23	Berlin, Germany
3:28.86		Noureddine Morceli (ALG)	1992-09-06	Rieti, Italy
3:27.37		Noureddine Morceli (ALG)	1995-07-12	Nice, France
3:26.00		Hicham El Guerrouj (MAR)	1998-07-14	Rome, Italy

The "Time" column indicates the ratified mark; the "Auto" column indicates a fully automatic time that was also recorded in the event when hand-timed marks were used for official records, or which was the basis for the official mark, rounded to the 10th of a second, depending on the rules then in place.

Auto times to the hundredth of a second were accepted by the IAAF for events up to and including 10,000m from 1981. Hence, Steve Ovett's record at 3:31.4 was rendered as 3:31.36 from that year.

== Women (outdoors) ==
=== Pre-IAAF ===
Time	Athlete	Date	Place
5:18.2	Anna Mushkina (URS)	1927-08-19	Moscow, Soviet Union
5:07.0	Anna Mushkina (URS)	1934-09-16	Alma-Ata, Soviet Union
5:02.0	Lydia Freiberg (URS)	1936-07-13	Moscow, Soviet Union
4:47.2	Yevdokiya Vasilyeva (URS)	1936-07-30	Moscow, Soviet Union
4:45.2	Yevdokiya Vasilyeva (URS)	1937-09-13	Moscow, Soviet Union
4:41.8	Anna Zaytseva-Bosenko (URS)	1940-06-10	Moscow, Soviet Union
4:38.0	Yevdokiya Vasilyeva (URS)	1944-08-17	Moscow, Soviet Union
4:37.8	Olga Ovsyannikova (URS)	1946-09-15	Dnepropetrovsk, Soviet Union
4:37.0	Nina Pletnyova (URS)	1952-08-30	Leningrad, Soviet Union
4:35.4	Phyllis Perkins (GBR)	1956-05-17	Hornchurch, Great Britain
4:30.0	Diane Leather (GBR)	1957-05-16	Hornchurch, Great Britain
4:29.7+	Diane Leather (GBR)	1957-07-19	London, Great Britain
4:19.0+	Marise Chamberlain (NZL)	1962-12-08	Perth, Australia

=== IAAF era ===
The first world record in the 1500 m for women (athletics) was recognized by the International Amateur Athletics Federation, now known as World Athletics, in 1967.

Time	Auto	Athlete	Date	Place	Ref.
4:17.3+		Anne Smith (GBR)	1967-06-03	Chiswick, Great Britain	
4:15.6		Maria Gommers (NED)	1967-10-24	Sittard, Netherlands	
4:12.4		Paola Pigni (ITA)	1969-07-02	Milan, Italy	
4:10.7	4:10.77	Jaroslava Jehličková (CZE)	1969-09-20	Athens, Greece	
4:09.6	4:09.62	Karin Burneleit (GDR)	1971-08-15	Helsinki, Finland	
4:06.9		Ludmila Bragina (URS)	1972-07-18	Moscow, Soviet Union	
4:06.5	4:06.47	Ludmila Bragina (URS)	1972-09-04	Munich, Germany	
4:05.1	4:05.07	Ludmila Bragina (URS)	1972-09-07	Munich, Germany	
4:01.4	4:01.38	Ludmila Bragina (URS)	1972-09-09	Munich, Germany	
3:56.0		Tatyana Kazankina (URS)	1976-06-28	Podolsk, Soviet Union	
3:55.0		Tatyana Kazankina (URS)	1980-07-06	Moscow, Soviet Union	
3:52.47		Tatyana Kazankina (URS)	1980-08-03	Zürich, Switzerland	
3:50.46		Qu Yunxia (CHN)	1993-09-11	Beijing, China	
3:50.07		Genzebe Dibaba (ETH)	2015-07-17	Fontvieille, Monaco	
3:49.11		Faith Kipyegon (KEN)	2023-06-02	Florence, Italy	
3:49.04		Faith Kipyegon (KEN)	2024-07-07	Paris, France	
3:48.68		Faith Kipyegon (KEN)	2025-07-05	Eugene, United States	

+ - En route time during mile race.

The "Time" column indicates the ratified mark; the "Auto" column indicates a fully automatic time that was also recorded in the event when hand-timed marks were used for official records, or which was the basis for the official mark, rounded to the 10th of a second, depending on the rules then in place.

The IAAF accepted records to the hundredth of a second starting in 1981.

== Men (indoors) ==
Indoor records are run over 7 3/4 laps of a shorter 200 m track. An asterisk indicates a record was repeated. All records since Gonzalez's 3:36.04 in 1986 were ratified by the IAAF.

Men's indoor 1500 metres world record progression
Time	Athlete	Date	Place
3.57.0	Joseph Ray (USA)	1920-05-30	New York
3.56.2	Paavo Nurmi (FIN)	1925-01-06	New York
3.55.8	Lloyd Hahn (USA)	1925-02-21	Washington
3.53.4	Gene Venzke (USA)	1932-02-27	New York
3.52.2*	William Bonthron (USA)	1934-02-24	New York
3.52.2	Glenn Cunningham (USA)	1934-02-24	New York
3.50.5	Glenn Cunningham (USA)	1935-02-23	New York
3.49.9	Gene Venzke (USA)	1936-02-22	New York
3.48.4	Glenn Cunningham (USA)	1938-02-26	New York
3.48.3	Wesley Santee (USA)	1955-02-05	New York
3.44.6	Siegfried Herrmann (GDR)	1960-02-28	Berlin Est
3.43.2	Jim Beatty (USA)	1962-02-10	Los Angeles
3.42.2	Jürgen May (GDR)	1965-02-14	Berlin East
3.42.0	Siegfried Herrmann (GDR)	1965-02-21	Berlin East
3.41.9	Jürgen May (GDR)	1966-02-20	Berlin East
3.41.7	Jürgen May (GDR)	1966-02-27	Berlin East
3.40.7	Michel Jazy (FRA)	1966-02-27	Lyon
3.37.8	Harald Norpoth (FRG)	1971-02-13	Berlin West
3.37.4	John Walker (NZL)	1979-01-06	Long Beach
3.36.04	José Luis Gonzalez (ESP)	1986-03-01	Oviedo
3.35.6	Marcus O'Sullivan (IRL)	1989-02-10	East Rutherford
3.34.20	Peter Elliott (GBR)	1990-02-27	Seville
3.34.16	Noureddine Morceli (ALG)	1991-02-28	Seville
3.31.18	Hicham El Guerrouj (MAR)	1997-02-02	Stuttgart
3.31.04	Samuel Tefera (ETH)	2019-02-16	Birmingham
3.30.60	Jakob Ingebrigtsen (NOR)	2022-02-17	Liévin
3.29.63+	Jakob Ingebrigtsen (NOR)	2025-02-13	Liévin

== Women (indoors) ==
All records since Decker-Slaney's 4:00.8 in 1980 were ratified by the IAAF.

Women's indoor 1500 metres world record progression
Time	Athlete	Date	Place
4.53.2	Brenda Cook (GBR)	1966-02-05	Cosford
4.40.8	Joyce Smith (GBR)	1966-02-12	Cosford
4.33.3	Doris Brown (USA)	1966-02-19	Vancouver
4.21.2	Doris Brown (USA)	1967-02-18	Vancouver
4.21.1	Doris Brown (USA)	1970-02-07	Seattle
4.20.5	Margaret Beacham (GBR)	1971-01-30	Cosford
4.19.7	Karin Burneleit (GDR)	1971-02-13	Berlin East
4.17.9	Christa Merten (FRG)	1971-02-13	Berlin West
4.17.4	Margaret Beacham (GBR)	1971-02-20	Berlin West
4.17.2	Margaret Beacham (GBR)	1971-03-14	Sofia
4.14.62	Tamara Pangelova (URS)	1972-03-12	Grenoble
4.12.2	Francie Larrieu (USA)	1974-02-15	Toronto
4.10.97	Tonka Petrova (BUL)	1974-03-10	Göteborg
4.10.4	Francie Larrieu (USA)	1975-02-14	Toronto
4.09.9	Francie Larrieu (USA)	1975-02-15	San Diego
4.09.8	Francie Larrieu (USA)	1975-03-03	Richmond
4.08.1	Mary Stewart (GBR)	1977-02-19	Dortmund
4.05.0	Natalia Marasescu (ROU)	1978-02-21	Budapest
4.03.0	Natalia Marasescu (ROU)	1979-02-10	Budapest
4.00.8	Mary Decker-Slaney (USA)	1980-02-08	New York
4.00.27	Doina Melinte (ROU)	1990-02-09	East Rutherford
3.59.98	Regina Jacobs (USA)	2003-02-01	Boston
3.58.28	Yelena Soboleva (RUS)	2006-02-18	Moscow
3.58.05	Yelena Soboleva (RUS)	2008-02-10	Moscow
3.57.71	Yelena Soboleva (RUS)	2008-03-09	Valencia
3.55.17	Genzebe Dibaba (ETH)	2014-02-01	Karlsruhe
3.53.09	Gudaf Tsegay (ETH)	2021-02-09	Liévin
