= Athletics at the 1970 Summer Universiade – Women's 800 metres =

The women's 800 metres event at the 1970 Summer Universiade was held at the Stadio Comunale in Turin on 4 and 5 September 1970.

== Medalists ==
| Gold | Silver | Bronze |
|---|---|---|
| Gunhild Hoffmeister; East Germany | Maria Sykora; Austria | Karin Burneleit; East Germany |

== Results ==
=== Heats ===
| Rank | Heat | Athlete | Nationality | Time | Notes |
|---|---|---|---|---|---|
| 1 | 1 | Vera Nikolić | Yugoslavia | 2:04.3 | Q |
| 2 | 1 | Abby Hoffman | Canada | 2:06.3 | Q |
| 3 | 1 | Jane Perry | Great Britain | 2:06.9 | q |
| 4 | 1 | Nijolė Sabaitė | Soviet Union | 2:07.2 | |
| 5 | 1 | Angela Ramello | Italy | 2:08.2 | |
| 6 | 1 | Sissy Brandnegger | Austria | 2:14.2 | |
| 7 | 1 | Shelly Marshall | United States | 2:19.0 | |
| 1 | 2 | Gunhild Hoffmeister | East Germany | 2:07.4 | Q |
| 2 | 2 | Sára Ligetkutiné | Hungary | 2:07.4 | Q |
| 3 | 2 | Terry Hull | United States | 2:07.8 | |
| 4 | 2 | Eva Hansumäe | Soviet Union | 2:11.3 | |
| 5 | 2 | Aurelia Pentón | Cuba | 2:12.3 | |
| 6 | 2 | Harpal Brar | India | 2:25.6 | |
| 1 | 3 | Karin Burneleit | East Germany | 2:02.2 | Q |
| 2 | 3 | Ileana Silai | Romania | 2:02.6 | Q |
| 3 | 3 | Maria Sykora | Austria | 2:04.7 | q |
| 4 | 3 | Carmen Trustée | Cuba | 2:09.7 | |
| 5 | 3 | Thelma Fynn | Canada | 2:13.2 | |
| 6 | 3 | Irenice Rodrigues | Brazil | 2:22.0 | |

=== Final ===
| Rank | Name | Nationality | Time | Notes |
|---|---|---|---|---|
| 1st place, gold medalist(s) | Gunhild Hoffmeister | East Germany | 2:01.8 | UR, NR |
| 2nd place, silver medalist(s) | Maria Sykora | Austria | 2:01.9 | |
| 3rd place, bronze medalist(s) | Karin Burneleit | East Germany | 2:02.2 | |
| 4 | Ileana Silai | Romania | 2:02.6 | |
| 5 | Vera Nikolić | Yugoslavia | 2:04.1 | |
| 6 | Sára Ligetkutiné | Hungary | 2:06.1 | |
| 7 | Jane Perry | Great Britain | 2:07.8 | |
| 8 | Abby Hoffman | Canada | 2:12.9 | |
