= Athletics at the 1972 Summer Olympics – Women's 800 metres =

Women's 800 metres at the Games of the XX Olympiad
- Venue: Olympic Stadium, Munich, West Germany
- Date: 31 August 1972 & 3 September 1972
- Competitors: 38 from 28 nations
- Winning time: 1:58.55 OR

Medalists
1st place, gold medalist(s)		Hildegard Falck; West Germany
2nd place, silver medalist(s)		Nijolė Sabaitė; Soviet Union
3rd place, bronze medalist(s)		Gunhild Hoffmeister; East Germany

These are the official results of the Women's 800 metres event at the 1972 Summer Olympics in Munich. The competition was held on 31 of August and 3 of September. The favorite coming into the Olympics was West German champion and world record holder Hildegard Falck. In the 1971 West German Championships she became the first woman to officially better two minutes. She was the pre Olympic favorite to win the gold on home soil, the rest of the field was wide open to claim the other podium spots.

In the final, like the men's race, the favorite was the slowest starter, though Falck quickly moved into sixth place. By the end of the first lap the field was tightly packed, Ileana Silai, Vera Nikolić and Svetla Zlateva and three abreast for the lead at 58.31. At 500 metres, Falck decided to move and slightly accelerated away from Nijolė Sabaitė and Gunhild Hoffmeister but found herself blocked behind the wall. The wall began to break up during the final turn, Silai the first to start fading allowing Falck some running room, coming off the turn she accelerated into the lead. Pulling away from the field Falck relaxed to cruise across the finish line. Sabaitė made a late run at her from a huge deficit, as she came into view, Falck had to accelerate a little to hold her off for a narrow win. Hoffmeister followed Sabaitė in passing the pack for bronze, but was too far behind to be competitive for higher medals.

While the 2 minute barrier had been broken barely a year before this race, five women finished under 2 minutes here, with the remainder of the field bunched within .17 of a second of 2 minutes. While the world record was 1:58.5 (hand timed at the time), this electronically timed 1:58.55 was intrinsically faster, but that conversion was not included in record keeping. Zlateva would improve the world record the following year.

== Heats ==
The top three runners in each heat (blue) and the next fastest (pink), advanced to the semifinal round.

=== Heat one ===
Rank	Athlete	Nation	Lane	Time
1	Hildegard Falck	West Germany	6	2:01.52
2	Madeline Manning	United States	7	2:02.63
3	Cheryl Peasley	Australia	8	2:03.11
4	Mary Tracey-Purcell	Ireland	3	2:04.18
5	Martine Duvivier	France	2	2:04.87
6	Donata Govoni	Italy	1	2:05.24
7	Elisabeth Neuenschwander	Switzerland	4	2:06.89
-	Arda Kalpakian	Lebanon	5	DNS

=== Heat two ===
Rank	Athlete	Nation	Lane	Time	Notes
1	Svetla Zlateva	Bulgaria	7	1:58.93	OR
2	Vera Nikolić	Yugoslavia	6	1:59.62	
3	Sylvia Schenk	West Germany	1	2:02.22	
4	Elżbieta Skowrońska	Poland	2	2:03.26	
5	Jenny Orr	Australia	8	2:04.46	
6	Cheryl Toussaint	United States	4	2:08.90	
7	Claire Walsh	Ireland	3	2:08.98	
8	Heather Gooding	Barbados	5	2:19.69	

=== Heat three ===
Rank	Athlete	Nation	Lane	Time
1	Nijolė Sabaitė	Soviet Union	4	2:01.50
2	Abby Hoffman	Canada	5	2:01.57
3	Maria Sykora	Austria	7	2:01.82
4	Gisela Ellenberger	West Germany	1	2:01.92
5	Maritta Politz	East Germany	3	2:02.40
6	Margaret Coomber	Great Britain	2	2:02.99
7	Emesia Chizunga	Malawi	6	2:19.22
-	Malak El-Nasser	Syria	8	DNF

=== Heat four ===
Rank	Athlete	Nation	Lane	Time
1	Ileana Silai	Romania	5	2:01.42
2	Annelise Damm Olesen	Denmark	3	2:01.77
3	Magdolna Kulcsár	Hungary	4	2:02.35
4	Patricia Cropper	Great Britain	8	2:03.55
5	Vasilena Amzina	Bulgaria	2	2:05.92
6	Marleen Verheuen	Belgium	7	2:09.13
7	Raissa Ruus	Soviet Union	1	2:11.18
8	Lee Chiu-hsia	Republic of China	6	2:11.81

=== Heat five ===
Rank	Athlete	Nation	Lane	Time
1	Nina Morhunova	Soviet Union	6	2:02.64
2	Gunhild Hoffmeister	East Germany	7	2:03.15
3	Rosemary Stirling	Great Britain	1	2:03.64
4	Sue Haden	New Zealand	4	2:04.86
5	Chereno Maiyo	Kenya	5	2:04.86
6	Wendy Koenig	United States	3	2:08.71
7	Malika Hadky	Morocco	2	2:12.46

== Semifinals ==
Top four in each heat advanced to the final round.

=== Heat one ===
Rank	Athlete	Nation	Lane	Time
1	Nijolė Sabaitė	Soviet Union	3	2:00.90
2	Gunhild Hoffmeister	East Germany	7	2:01.21
3	Abby Hoffman	Canada	4	2:01.37
4	Vera Nikolić	Yugoslavia	1	2:01.49
5	Sylvia Schenk	West Germany	2	2:01.50
6	Annelisa Damm Olesen	Denmark	5	2:04.19
7	Cheryl Peasley	Australia	8	2:04.56
-	Magdolna Kulcsár	Hungary	6	DNS

=== Heat two ===
Rank	Athlete	Nation	Lane	Time
1	Hildegard Falck	West Germany	5	2:01.41
2	Svetla Zlateva	Bulgaria	3	2:01.66
3	Ileana Silai	Romania	8	2:01.85
4	Rosemary Stirling	Great Britain	6	2:02.36
5	Madeline Manning	United States	2	2:02.39
6	Maria Sykora	Austria	4	2:02.44
7	Gisela Ellenberger	West Germany	7	2:02.97
8	Nina Morhunova	Soviet Union	1	2:04.93

== Final ==
Rank	Athlete	Nation	Lane	Time	Notes
1st place, gold medalist(s)	Hildegard Falck	West Germany	1	1:58.55	OR
2nd place, silver medalist(s)	Nijolė Sabaitė	Soviet Union	5	1:58.65	
3rd place, bronze medalist(s)	Gunhild Hoffmeister	East Germany	6	1:59.19	
4	Svetla Zlateva	Bulgaria	2	1:59.72	
5	Vera Nikolić	Yugoslavia	8	1:59.98	
6	Ileana Silai	Romania	3	2:00.04	
7	Rosemary Stirling	Great Britain	4	2:00.15	
8	Abby Hoffman	Canada	7	2:00.17	

Key: OR = Olympic record; DNS = did not start; DNF = did not finish
