= Athletics at the 1968 Summer Olympics – Women's 800 metres =

Women's 800 metres at the Games of the XIX Olympiad
- Venue: Estadio Olímpico Universitario
- Date: October 17–19, 1968
- Competitors: 24 from 16 nations
- Winning time: 2:00.9 OR

Medalists
1st place, gold medalist(s)		Madeline Manning	United States
2nd place, silver medalist(s)		Ileana Silai	Romania
3rd place, bronze medalist(s)		Mia Gommers	Netherlands

The Women's 800 metres competition at the 1968 Summer Olympics in Mexico City, Mexico. The event were held at the University Olympic Stadium on October 17–19.

Madeline Manning became the first Black woman to win an Olympic 800m title. She also became the first American to do so.

== Competition format ==
The competition had four heats in the first round, two semi-finals and a final. The top four in the first round heats progressed. The top four finishers in the semi-final race reached the finals.

== Records ==
Prior to the competition, the existing World and Olympic records were as follows.

World record	Vera Nikolić (YUG)	2:00.5	London, United Kingdom	July 20, 1968
Olympic record	Ann Packer (GBR)	2:01.1	Tokyo, Japan	October 20, 1964

== Results ==
=== Round 1 ===
==== Heat 1 ====
Rank	Athlete	Nation	Time (hand)	Time (automatic)	Notes
1	Vera Nikolic	Yugoslavia	2:05.7	2:05.78	Q
2	Laine Erik	Soviet Union	2:06.5	2:06.52	Q
3	Paola Pigni	Italy	2:06.7	2:06.72	Q
4	Karin Krebs	East Germany	2:07.1	2:07.13	Q
5	Francie Kraker	United States	2:07.3	2:07.34	
6	Elizabeth Chesire	Kenya	2:10.9	2:10.92	
	Aurelia Pentón	Cuba	DNS	–	

==== Heat 2 ====
Rank	Athlete	Nation	Time (hand)	Time (automatic)	Notes
1	Mia Gommers	Netherlands	2:04.0	2:04.06	Q
2	Ileana Silai	Romania	2:04.1	2:04.11	Q
3	Sheila Carey	Great Britain	2:04.1	2:04.17	Q
4	Anna Zimina	Soviet Union	2:04.4	2:04.48	Q
5	Barbara Wieck	East Germany	2:08.5	2:08.18	
6	Hana Shezifi	Israel	2:09.2	2:09.23	

==== Heat 3 ====
Rank	Athlete	Nation	Time (hand)	Time (automatic)	Notes
1	Maryvonne Dupureur	France	2:09.5	2:09.55	Q
2	Doris Brown	United States	2:09.5	2:09.54	Q
3	Pat Lowe-Cropper	Great Britain	2:09.5	2:09.57	Q
4	Sylvia Potts	New Zealand	2:09.6	2:09.63	Q
5	Eeva Haimi	Finland	2:09.6	2:09.67	
6	Tilly van der Made	Netherlands	2:10.5	2:10.59	

==== Heat 4 ====
Rank	Athlete	Nation	Time (hand)	Time (automatic)	Notes
1	Madeline Manning	United States	2:08.7	2:08.74	Q
2	Abby Hoffman	Canada	2:08.9	2:08.74	Q
3	Jaroslava Jehlicková	Czechoslovakia	2:08.9	2:08.96	Q
4	Ilja Keizer	Netherlands	2:08.9	2:08.96	Q
5	Annelise Damm Olesen	Denmark	2:09.0	2:09.01	
6	Joan Page-Allison	Great Britain	2:10.2	2:10.21	

=== Semifinals ===
==== Heat 1 ====
Rank	Athlete	Nation	Time (hand)	Time (automatic)	Notes
1	Madeline Manning	United States	2:05.8	2:05.82	Q
2	Ileana Silai	Romania	2:05.9	2:05.94	Q
3	Pat Lowe-Cropper	Great Britain	2:06.6	2:06.62	Q
4	Abby Hoffman	Canada	2:07.0	2:07.03	Q
5	Karin Krebs	East Germany	2:08.4	2:08.41	
6	Anna Zimina	Soviet Union	2:08.5	2:08.54	
7	Ilja Keizer	Netherlands	2:14.8	2:14.88	
—N/a	Vera Nikolic	Yugoslavia	DNF	–	

==== Heat 2 ====
Rank	Athlete	Nation	Time (hand)	Time (automatic)	Notes
1	Mia Gommers	Netherlands	2:05.1	2:05.13	Q
2	Doris Brown	United States	2:05.2	2:05.23	Q
3	Sheila Carey	Great Britain	2:05.2	2:05.29	Q
4	Maryvonne Dupureur	France	2:05.5	2:05.58	Q
5	Laine Erik	Soviet Union	2:06.0	2:06.09	
6	Sylvia Potts	New Zealand	2:07.2	2:07.27	
7	Paola Pigni	Italy	2:07.8	2:07.82	
8	Jaroslava Jehlicková	Czechoslovakia	2:13.5	2:13.59	

=== Final ===
Rank	Athlete	Nation	Time (hand)	Time (automatic)	Notes
1st place, gold medalist(s)	Madeline Manning	United States	2:00.9	2:00.92	OR
2nd place, silver medalist(s)	Ileana Silai	Romania	2:02.5	2:02.58	
3rd place, bronze medalist(s)	Mia Gommers	Netherlands	2:02.6	2:02.63	
4	Sheila Carey	Great Britain	2:03.8	2:03.81	
5	Doris Brown	United States	2:03.9	2:03.98	
6	Pat Lowe-Cropper	Great Britain	2:04.2	2:04.25	
7	Abby Hoffman	Canada	2:06.8	2:06.99	
8	Maryvonne Dupureur	France	2:08.2	2:08.28	
