= 1974 European Athletics Indoor Championships – Women's 1500 metres =

The women's 1500 metres event at the 1974 European Athletics Indoor Championships was held on 10 March in Gothenburg.

== Results ==
Rank	Name	Nationality	Time	Notes
1st place, gold medalist(s)	Tonka Petrova	Bulgaria	4:10.97	WB
2nd place, silver medalist(s)	Karin Burneleit	East Germany	4:11.33	NR
3rd place, bronze medalist(s)	Tamara Kazachkova	Soviet Union	4:14.45	
4	Ileana Silai	Romania	4:17.12	
5	Mary Stewart	Great Britain	4:19.00	
6	Lyudmila Bragina	Soviet Union	4:20.80	
7	Urszula Prasek	Poland	4:21.26	
8	Božena Sudická	Czechoslovakia	4:21.45	
9	Doris Gluth	East Germany	4:23.06	
10	Wenche Sørum	Norway	4:23.19	
11	Nadežda Varcabová	Czechoslovakia	4:25.19	
