= 1971 European Athletics Indoor Championships – Women's 1500 metres =

The women's 1500 metres event at the 1971 European Athletics Indoor Championships was held on 14 March in Sofia. This was the first time that this distance was contested at the championships by women.

== Results ==
Rank	Name	Nationality	Time	Notes
1st place, gold medalist(s)	Margaret Beacham	Great Britain	4:17.2	WB
2nd place, silver medalist(s)	Lyudmila Bragina	Soviet Union	4:17.8	
3rd place, bronze medalist(s)	Tamara Pangelova	Soviet Union	4:18.1	
4	Ellen Tittel	West Germany	4:18.4	
5	Christa Merten	West Germany	4:18.8	
6	Vasilena Amzina	Bulgaria	4:25.6	
7	Angela Ramello	Italy	4:27.3	
