= 1971 European Athletics Championships – Women's 1500 metres =

Women's 1500 metres at the European Athletics Championships

The women's 1500 metres at the 1971 European Athletics Championships was held in Helsinki, Finland, at Helsinki Olympic Stadium on 13 and 15 August 1971.

== Medalists ==
Gold	Karin Burneleit; East Germany
Silver	Gunhild Hoffmeister; East Germany
Bronze	Ellen Tittel; West Germany

== Results ==
=== Final ===
15 August

Rank	Name	Nationality	Time	Notes
1st place, gold medalist(s)	Karin Burneleit	East Germany	4:09.62	WR
2nd place, silver medalist(s)	Gunhild Hoffmeister	East Germany	4:10.31	
3rd place, bronze medalist(s)	Ellen Tittel	West Germany	4:10.35	NR
4	Rita Ridley	Great Britain	4:12.65	NR
5	Regine Kleinau	East Germany	4:13.71	
6	Lyudmila Bragina	Soviet Union	4:13.93	
7	Jaroslava Jehličková	Czechoslovakia	4:14.79	
8	Joan Allison	Great Britain	4:14.81	
9	Sara Ligetkuti	Hungary	4:16.06	NR
10	Vasilena Amzina	Bulgaria	4:17.27	
11	Sheila Carey	Great Britain	4:17.54	
12	Inger Knutsson	Sweden	4:21.45	

=== Heats ===
13 August

==== Heat 1 ====
Rank	Name	Nationality	Time	Notes
1	Ellen Tittel	West Germany	4:14.2	Q
2	Lyudmila Bragina	Soviet Union	4:15.0	Q
3	Regine Kleinau	East Germany	4:15.3	Q
4	Sheila Carey	Great Britain	4:16.2	Q
5	Zsuzsa Völgyi	Hungary	4:18.0	NR
6	Sinikka Tyynelä	Finland	4:22.0	NR
7	Maria-Belen Azpeitia	Spain	4:24.0	NR
8	Anneke de Lange	Netherlands	4:24.2	
9	Vera Nikolić	Yugoslavia	4:24.5	
10	Angela Ramello	Italy	4:30.3	

==== Heat 2 ====
Rank	Name	Nationality	Time	Notes
1	Karin Burneleit	East Germany	4:14.9	Q
2	Vasilena Amzina	Bulgaria	4:16.8	NR Q
3	Rita Ridley	Great Britain	4:17.4	Q
4	Inger Knutsson	Sweden	4:18.2	Q
5	Magdolna Kulcsár	Hungary	4:21.2	
6	Đurica Rajher	Yugoslavia	4:22.4	
7	Joke van der Stelt	Netherlands	4:23.0	
8	Catherine Bultez	France	4:23.1	NR
9	Gerda Klöpfer	West Germany	4:25.8	

==== Heat 3 ====
Rank	Name	Nationality	Time	Notes
1	Gunhild Hoffmeister	East Germany	4:17.2	Q
2	Joan Allison	Great Britain	4:17.2	Q
3	Jaroslava Jehličková	Czechoslovakia	4:17.4	Q
4	Sara Ligetkuti	Hungary	4:17.6	NR Q
5	Christa Merten	West Germany	4:18.2	
6	Galina Kuzmina	Soviet Union	4:19.1	
7	Els Gommers	Netherlands	4:19.3	
8	Grete Andersen	Norway	4:23.0	
9	Bronisława Doborzyńska	Poland	4:24.2	
10	Zina Boniolo	Italy	4:31.4	
11	Lena Sjöstedt	Sweden	4:34.0	

== Participation ==
According to an unofficial count, 30 athletes from 16 countries participated in the event.

- Bulgaria (1)
- Czechoslovakia (1)
- East Germany (3)
- Finland (1)
- France (1)
- Hungary (3)
- Italy (2)
- Netherlands (3)
- Norway (1)
- Poland (1)
- Soviet Union (2)
- Spain (1)
- Sweden (2)
- Great Britain (3)
- West Germany (3)
- Yugoslavia (2)
