= 1969 European Athletics Championships – Women's 1500 metres =

Women's 1500 metres at the European Athletics Championships

The women's 1500 metres at the 1969 European Athletics Championships was held in Athens, Greece, at Georgios Karaiskakis Stadium on 19 and 20 September 1969.

== Medalists ==
Gold	Jaroslava Jehličková; Czechoslovakia
Silver	Maria Gommers; Netherlands
Bronze	Paola Pigni; Italy

== Results ==
=== Final ===
20 September

Rank	Name	Nationality	Time	Notes
1st place, gold medalist(s)	Jaroslava Jehličková	Czechoslovakia	4:10.77	WR
2nd place, silver medalist(s)	Maria Gommers	Netherlands	4:11.9	NR
3rd place, bronze medalist(s)	Paola Pigni	Italy	4:12.0	NR
4	Lyudmila Bragina	Soviet Union	4:13.2	NR
5	Ilja Keizer	Netherlands	4:13.3	
6	Regina Kleinau	East Germany	4:15.2	NR
7	Rita Ridley	Great Britain	4:15.9	NR
8	Anne-Marie Nenzell	Sweden	4:16.6	NR
9	Anneloes Bosman	Netherlands	4:17.6	
10	Alla Kolesnikova	Soviet Union	4:18.2	
11	Gunhild Hoffmeister	East Germany	4:23.2	
12	Emília Přivřelová	Czechoslovakia	4:32.8	

=== Heats ===
19 September

==== Heat 1 ====
Rank	Name	Nationality	Time	Notes
1	Paola Pigni	Italy	4:17.2	CR Q
2	Rita Ridley	Great Britain	4:18.2	Q
3	Lyudmila Bragina	Soviet Union	4:18.3	Q
4	Gunhild Hoffmeister	East Germany	4:18.4	Q
5	Ilja Keizer	Netherlands	4:18.6	Q
6	Emília Přivřelová	Czechoslovakia	4:19.0	Q
7	Lyudmila Safonova	Soviet Union	4:21.3	
8	Vasilena Amzina	Bulgaria	4:22.2	
9	Maria Linca	Romania	4:24.6	
10	Zofia Kołakowska	Poland	4:25.4	
11	Ann O'Brien	Ireland		

==== Heat 2 ====
Rank	Name	Nationality	Time	Notes
1	Maria Gommers	Netherlands	4:17.9	Q
2	Anneloes Bosman	Netherlands	4:18.1	Q
3	Alla Kolesnikova	Soviet Union	4:19.1	Q
4	Regina Kleinau	East Germany	4:21.5	Q
5	Anne-Marie Nenzell	Sweden	4:22.2	Q
6	Jaroslava Jehličková	Czechoslovakia	4:28.4	Q
7	María Budavári	Hungary	4:31.6	
8	Thelwyn Bateman	Great Britain	4:35.2	
9	Angela Ramello	Italy	4:36.6	
10	Veselinka Milošević	Yugoslavia	4:36.9	
	Waltraud Pöhland	East Germany	DNF	

== Participation ==
According to an unofficial count, 22 athletes from 13 countries participated in the event.

- Bulgaria (1)
- Czechoslovakia (2)
- East Germany (3)
- Hungary (1)
- Ireland (1)
- Italy (2)
- Netherlands (3)
- Poland (1)
- Romania (1)
- Soviet Union (3)
- Sweden (1)
- Great Britain (2)
- Yugoslavia (1)
