= Athletics at the 1975 Summer Universiade – Women's 800 metres =

The women's 800 metres event at the 1975 Summer Universiade was held at the Stadio Olimpico in Rome with the final on 21 September.

== Medalists ==
Gold	Silver	Bronze
Nina Morgunova; Soviet Union	Pavel Litovchenko; Czechoslovakia	Nikolina Shtereva; Bulgaria

== Results ==
=== Heats ===
Rank	Heat	Athlete	Nationality	Time	Notes
1	1	Nina Morgunova	Soviet Union	2:05.11	Q
2	1	Nikolina Shtereva	Bulgaria	2:05.21	Q
3	1	Martine Rooms	France	2:05.45	Q
4	1	Maureen Crowley	Canada	2:05.48	q
5	2	Jozefína Čerchlanová	Czechoslovakia	2:06.67	Q
6	2	Magdolna Lázár	Hungary	2:06.73	Q
7	2	Yuliya Safina	Soviet Union	2:06.95	Q
8	2	Chantal Jouvhomme	France	2:07.53	q
9	2	Sylvia Schenk	West Germany	2:09.99	
10	1	Rita Delpinto	Italy	2:11.25	
11	1	Maria da Silva	Brazil	2:12.40	
12	2	Zoungapo	Central African Republic	2:51.78	

=== Final ===
Rank	Athlete	Nationality	Time	Notes
1st place, gold medalist(s)	Nina Morgunova	Soviet Union	2:01.94	
2nd place, silver medalist(s)	Jozefína Čerchlanová	Czechoslovakia	2:02.45	
3rd place, bronze medalist(s)	Nikolina Shtereva	Bulgaria	2:02.74	
4	Magdolna Lázár	Hungary	2:04.58	
5	Maureen Crowley	Canada	2:05.59	
6	Chantal Jouvhomme	France	2:06.69	
7	Yuliya Safina	Soviet Union	2:07.12	
8	Martine Rooms	France	2:12.18	
