= Mia Gommers =

Dutch athletics competitor

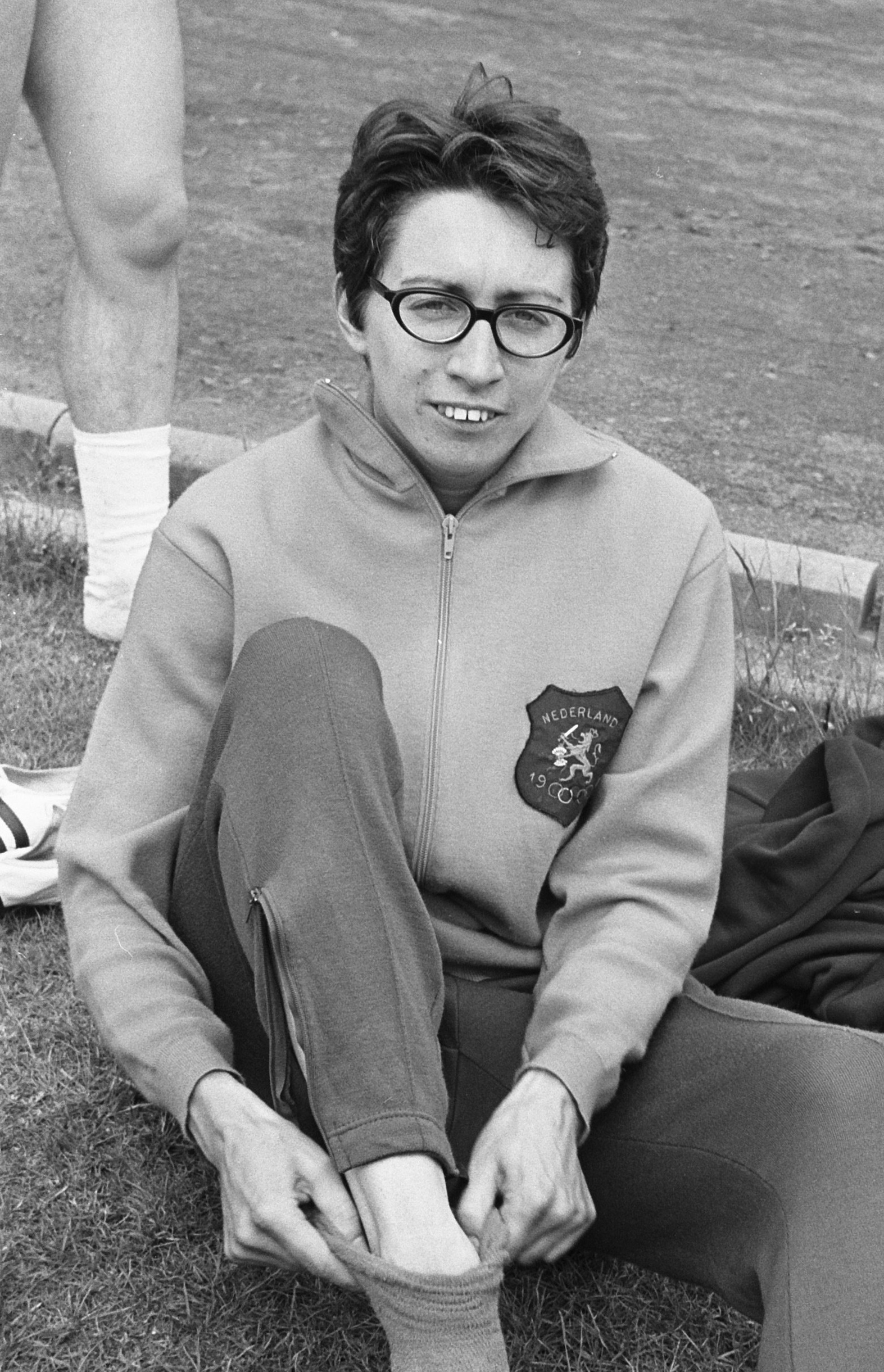
- Mia Gommers in 1969

Personal information
- Born: 26 September 1939 (age 86) Stein, Limburg, Netherlands
- Height: 1.66 m (5 ft 5 in)
- Weight: 53 kg (117 lb)

Sport
- Sport: Athletics
- Club: Unitas, Sittard
Medal record
Women's athletics
Representing Netherlands
Olympic Games
| Bronze medal – third place | 1968 Mexico City | 800 m |
European Championships
| Silver medal – second place | 1969 Athens | 1500 m |

Maria ("Mia") Francisca Philomena Hoogakker-Gommers (born 26 September 1939) is a Dutch retired athlete, who competed mainly in the 800 metres and competed at the 1968 Summer Olympics.

== Biography ==
Gommers was the second female world record-holder over 1500 metres in October 1967 at Sittard, Netherlands, breaking the record of Anne Smith, who set the record in June of that year, by almost two seconds.

Gommers competed for the Netherlands at the 1968 Olympics Games held in Mexico City, Mexico. in the 800 metres, where she won the bronze medal.

On 14 June 1969 she also broke Smith's world record on the mile in an event in Leicester, England. One month later she won the British WAAA Championships title in the 1500 metres event at the 1969 WAAA Championships.

At the 1969 European Championships in Athletics in Athens on 20 September 1969, she ran below Paola Pigni's new 1500 m record, but was beaten to the finish by Jaroslava Jehlickova.

In 1969 she was chosen the Dutch female sportsperson of the year.

Records
| Preceded by Anne Smith | Women's 1500 m world record holder 24 October 1967 – 2 July 1969 | Succeeded by Paola Pigni |
| Preceded by Anne Smith | Women's mile world record holder 14 June 1969 – 20 August 1971 | Succeeded by Ellen Tittel |
Awards
| Preceded by Corrie Bakker | KNAU Cup; 1967, 1968 | Succeeded by Wilma van den Berg |
| Preceded by Ada Kok | Dutch Sportswoman of the Year; 1969 | Succeeded by Atje Keulen-Deelstra |
