= Hildegard Falck =

Retired West German runner

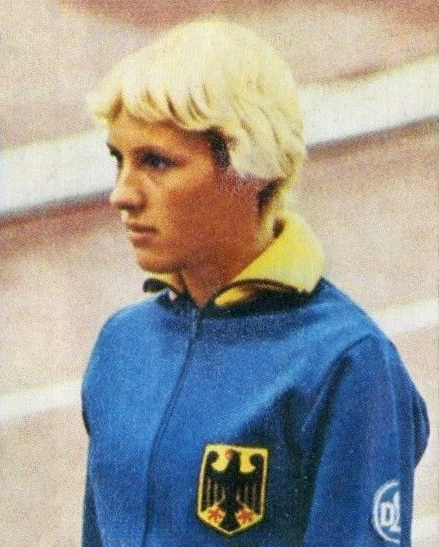

Personal information
- Born: 8 June 1949 (age 77) Nettelrede, West Germany
- Height: 1.73 m (5 ft 8 in)
- Weight: 58 kg (128 lb)

Sport
- Sport: Athletics
- Events: 400 m, 800 m, 1500 m
- Club: Hannover 96

Achievements and titles
- Personal bests: 400 m – 53.1 (1974); 800 m – 1:58.45 (1971); 1500 m – 4:14.6 (1971)
Medal record
Women's athletics
Representing West Germany
Olympic Games
Gold medal – first place	1972 Munich	800 m
Bronze medal – third place	1972 Munich	4×400 m
European Championships
Silver medal – second place	1971 Helsinki	4×400 m
European Indoor Championships
Gold medal – first place	1971 Sofia	800 m

Hildegard Falck (née Janze; born 8 June 1949) is a retired West German runner. At the 1972 Olympics she won a gold medal in the 800 m and a bronze medal in the 4 × 400 m relay with West German team. In the 800 m final she finished 0.1 seconds ahead of Nijolė Sabaitė and Gunhild Hoffmeister.

On 11 July 1971 Falck ran the 800 m in 1:58.5 minutes in Stuttgart, improving the world record of Vera Nikolic by two seconds. She was the first woman to clock a time under two minutes if the unratified marks of Sin Kim Dan are discounted. Her record stood until 1973.

Before turning to athletics, Falck studied to become a secondary school teacher and trained in handball and swimming. In 1971, besides her 800 m world record, she won a gold medal in the 800 m at the European Indoor Championships and a silver in the 4 × 400 m relay at European Championships; she also helped Ellen Tittel, Sylvia Schenk and Christa Merten to break the 4 × 800 m world record.

Domestically she won the 800 m titles in 1970 and 1971 (both indoor and outdoor), and in 1973 outdoor. In 1972, she was awarded the Silver Bay Leaf of the German Track & Field Association.

Falck was coached by her husband Rolf Falck. They later divorced, and she married Dr. Klaus Kimmich, a pentathlete with whom she had two children.

Records
Preceded by (Socialist Federal Republic of Yugoslavia) Vera Nikolic	Women's 800 metres World Record Holder; 11 July 1971 – 24 August 1973	Succeeded by (Bulgaria) Svetla Zlateva
