= 1969 European Indoor Games – Women's 800 metres =

The women's 800 metres event at the 1969 European Indoor Games was held on 9 March in Belgrade.

== Results ==
Rank	Name	Nationality	Time	Notes
1st place, gold medalist(s)	Barbara Wieck	East Germany	2:05.3	WB
2nd place, silver medalist(s)	Magdolna Kulcsár	Hungary	2:07.5	
3rd place, bronze medalist(s)	Anna Zimina	Soviet Union	2:08.0	
4	Emília Ovádková	Czechoslovakia	2:09.8	
5	Zofia Kołakowska	Poland	2:10.8	
6	Annelise Damm Olesen	Denmark	2:11.6	
7	Mirjana Kovačev	Yugoslavia	2:15.7	
8	Maria Sykora	Austria	2:18.7	
