= 1972 European Athletics Indoor Championships – Women's 1500 metres =

The women's 1500 metres event at the 1972 European Athletics Indoor Championships was held on 12 March in Grenoble.

== Results ==
Rank	Name	Nationality	Time	Notes
1st place, gold medalist(s)	Tamara Pangelova	Soviet Union	4:14.62	WB
2nd place, silver medalist(s)	Lyudmila Bragina	Soviet Union	4:18.35	
3rd place, bronze medalist(s)	Vasilena Amzina	Bulgaria	4:18.84	
4	Ellen Tittel	West Germany	4:20.23	
5	Monique Baulu	France	4:49.38	
