= 1969 European Athletics Championships – Women's 800 metres =

Women's 800 metres at the European Athletics Championships

The women's 800 metres at the 1969 European Athletics Championships was held in Athens, Greece, at Georgios Karaiskakis Stadium on 16 and 18 September 1969.

== Medalists ==
Gold	Lillian Board; Great Britain
Silver	Annelise Damm Olesen; Denmark
Bronze	Vera Nikolić; Yugoslavia

== Results ==
=== Final ===
18 September

Rank	Name	Nationality	Time	Notes
1st place, gold medalist(s)	Lillian Board	Great Britain	2:01.50	CR
2nd place, silver medalist(s)	Annelise Damm Olesen	Denmark	2:02.6	NR
3rd place, bronze medalist(s)	Vera Nikolić	Yugoslavia	2:02.6	
4	Barbara Wieck	East Germany	2:02.7	
5	Ileana Silai	Romania	2:03.0	
6	Patricia Lowe	Great Britain	2:03.4	
7	Anne-Marie Nenzell	Sweden	2:05.2	
8	Ilja Keizer	Netherlands	2:05.2	

=== Heats ===
16 September

==== Heat 1 ====
Rank	Name	Nationality	Time	Notes
1	Ileana Silai	Romania	2:05.0	Q
2	Anne-Marie Nenzell	Sweden	2:06.0	Q
3	Gertrud Schmidt	East Germany	2:06.0	
4	Zofia Kołakowska	Poland	2:07.1	
5	Britt Ramstad	Norway	2:07.4	
6	Neşe Karatepe	Turkey	2:18.8	

==== Heat 2 ====
Rank	Name	Nationality	Time	Notes
1	Vera Nikolić	Yugoslavia	2:04.2	Q
2	Patricia Lowe	Great Britain	2:05.9	Q
3	Milda Kade	Soviet Union	2:06.7	
4	Maryvonne Dupureur	France	2:09.6	
5	María Budavári	Hungary	2:10.7	

==== Heat 3 ====
Rank	Name	Nationality	Time	Notes
1	Lillian Board	Great Britain	2:04.2	Q
2	Annelise Damm Olesen	Denmark	2:04.5	NR Q
3	Ilja Keizer	Netherlands	2:04.8	q
4	Barbara Wieck	East Germany	2:05.4	q

== Participation ==
According to an unofficial count, 15 athletes from 13 countries participated in the event.

- Denmark (1)
- East Germany (2)
- France (1)
- Hungary (1)
- Netherlands (1)
- Norway (1)
- Poland (1)
- Romania (1)
- Soviet Union (1)
- Sweden (1)
- Turkey (1)
- Great Britain (2)
- Yugoslavia (1)
