= 1968 European Indoor Games – Women's medley relay =

The women's 182 + 364 + 546 + 728 medley relay event at the 1968 European Indoor Games was held on 9 March in Madrid. The first athlete ran one lap of the 182-metre track, the second two, the third three and the anchor four, thus 10 laps or 1820 metres in total.

== Results ==
Rank	Nation	Competitors	Time	Notes
1st place, gold medalist(s)	Soviet Union	Liliya Tkachenko; Vera Popkova; Nadezhda Syeropegina; Anna Zimina	4:28.4	
2nd place, silver medalist(s)	Czechoslovakia	Eva Putnová; Vlasta Seifertová; Libuše Macounová; Emilie Ovadková	4:39.0	
