= Elisabeth Neuenschwander =

Swiss middle-distance runner

Elisabeth Neuenschwander (born 26 April 1946) is a Swiss former middle-distance runner from Bern. She competed in the 800 metres event at the 1972 Summer Olympics but finished seventh in her heat, last among those who started the heat, with a time of 2:06.89. (Arda Kalpakian of Lebanon was placed in the heat, but did not start.) Her personal best time in the 800 metres was 2:05.4, set in 1972.
