= Athletics at the 1971 Pan American Games – Women's 800 metres =

Women's 800 metres at the Pan American Games

The women's 800 metres event at the 1971 Pan American Games was held in Cali on 31 July and 1 August.

== Medalists ==
Gold	Silver	Bronze
Abigail Hoffman; Canada	Doris Brown; United States	Penny Werthner; Canada

== Results ==
=== Heats ===
Rank	Heat	Name	Nationality	Time	Notes
1	1	Doris Brown	United States	2:10.21	Q
2	2	Terry Crawford	United States	2:10.72	Q
3	1	Abigail Hoffman	Canada	2:12.46	Q
4	2	Penny Werthner	Canada	2:14.24	Q
5	1	María Cristina Ducci	Chile	2:15.15	Q
6	1	Iris Fernández	Argentina	2:15.33	Q
7	1	Edith Smith	Virgin Islands	2:25.97	
8	2	Gloria González	Chile	2:32.69	Q
9	2	Rosalia Abadía	Panama	2:32.73	Q
10	2	Russel Carrero	Nicaragua	2:40.74	
	1	Carmen Trustée	Cuba	DNS	
	2	Aurelia Pentón	Cuba	DNS	

=== Final ===
Rank	Name	Nationality	Time	Notes
1st place, gold medalist(s)	Abigail Hoffman	Canada	2:05.54	
2nd place, silver medalist(s)	Doris Brown	United States	2:05.90	
3rd place, bronze medalist(s)	Penny Werthner	Canada	2:06.32	
4	Terry Crawford	United States	2:09.01	
5	Gloria González	Chile	2:13.08	
6	Iris Fernández	Argentina	2:14.31	
7	Rosalia Abadía	Panama	2:20.08	
	María Cristina Ducci	Chile	DNS	
