= Claire Walsh =

Claire Walsh may refer to:

- Claire Walsh (General Hospital)
- Claire Walsh (athlete) (born 1942), Irish middle-distance runner
- Claire Walsh (footballer) (born 1994), Irish footballer
