= 1973 European Athletics Indoor Championships – Women's 1500 metres =

The women's 1500 metres event at the 1973 European Athletics Indoor Championships was held on 11 March in Rotterdam. There were only three participants.

== Results ==
Rank	Name	Nationality	Time	Notes
1st place, gold medalist(s)	Ellen Tittel	West Germany	4:16.17	
2nd place, silver medalist(s)	Tonka Petrova	Bulgaria	4:17.20	
3rd place, bronze medalist(s)	Iris Claus	East Germany	4:21.49	
