= Jaroslava Jehličková =

Medal record

Women's athletics

Representing Czechoslovakia

European Championships
| Gold medal – first place | 1969 Athens | 1500 m |

Jaroslava Jehličková (born 24 March 1942) is a Czech former middle-distance runner for Czechoslovakia. She was the first ever international champion in the women's 1500 metres, winning the gold at the 1969 European Athletics Championships in a world record time of 4:10.77 minutes. She competed twice at the Summer Olympic Games (1968 and 1972). During her career, she set personal bests of 2:04.7 for the 800 metres and 4:08.39 for the 1500 m.

== Career ==
Born in Hořice, Jehličková established herself at national level in the mid-1960s in the 800 m, which was then the longest distance regularly by women. She won the Czechoslovak Athletics Championships in 1966, then again in 1968. This earned her her debut at the 1968 Mexico City Olympics, where she was a semi-finalist. The longer 1500 m was introduced as a championship event for the 1969 European Athletics Championships—the first time the women's race was incorporated at a major international event—and it began to be contested more widely. Jehličková became the first Czechoslovak national champion in the 1500 m, and she also defended her 800 m title.

The 1500 m world record holder Paola Pigni was among the favourites for the 1969 European title, but it was Jehličková that triumphed, breaking the world record in the process with a time of 4:10.77 minutes for the gold medal. This made her the world's first international women's champion in the 1500 m.

She did not compete in the 1970 season, but returned in 1971 to repeat her middle-distance double at the national championships. She attempted to defend her 1500 m title at the 1971 European Athletics Championships, but could not compete to the same standard and finished seventh. Karin Burneleit won the race and also improved Jehličková's world record by over a second in the process.

Jehličková's final year of competition at a high level was in 1972. She won her last national title in the 1500 m, bringing her total over both middle-distance events to seven national titles overall. She achieved personal bests of 2:04.7 minutes for the 800 m and 4:08.39 minutes for the 1500 m that year. Her last major appearance came at the 1972 Munich Olympics. She proved to be a spent force, finishing a distant last in her 1500 m semi-final. She ranked twelfth in the world on time for that season.

== National titles ==
- Czechoslovak Athletics Championships
  - 800 m: 1966, 1968, 1969, 1971
  - 1500 m: 1969, 1971, 1972

== International competitions ==
| Year | Competition | Venue | Position | Event | Notes |
|---|---|---|---|---|---|
| 1968 | Olympic Games | Mexico City, Mexico | 15th (semis) | 800 m | 2:13.5 |
| 1969 | European Championships | Athens, Greece | 1st | 1500 m | 4:10.77 WR |
| 1971 | European Championships | Helsinki, Finland | 7th | 1500 m | 4:14.79 |
| 1972 | Olympic Games | Munich, Germany | 18th (semis) | 1500 m | 4:18.16 |

== See also ==
- List of European Athletics Championships medalists (women)

Records
| Preceded by Paola Pigni | Women's 1500 m world record holder 20 September 1969 – 15 August 1971 | Succeeded by Karin Burneleit |
