= Anna Bukis =

Polish athletics competitor

Personal information
- Born: 8 September 1953 (age 72) Wałcz, West Pomeranian Voivodeship, Poland
- Height: 167 cm (5 ft 6 in)
Medal record
Women's athletics
Representing Poland
European Indoor Championships
Silver medal – second place	1980 Sindelfingen	1500 m
European Cup
Bronze medal – third place	1981 Zagreb	1500 m

Anna Bukis (born 8 September 1953) is a former Polish female athlete. She represented Poland at the 1980 Summer Olympics.

== See also ==
- Poland at the 1980 Summer Olympics
