= Iris Fernández =

Argentine distance runner (born 1946)

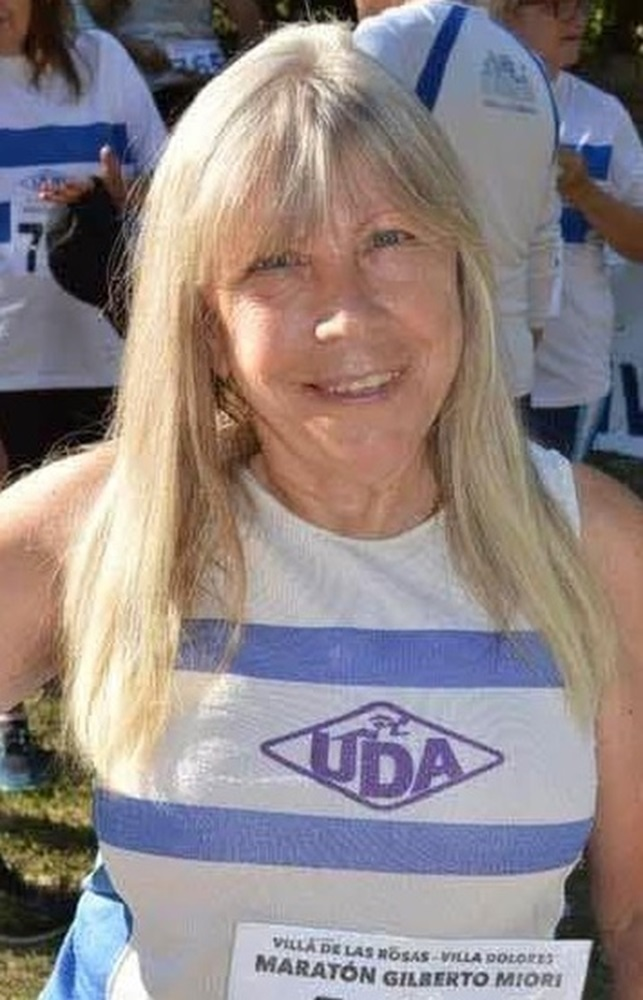
- Iris Fernández in Villa Dolores, Córdoba, Argentina, on February 19, 2023

Personal information
- Full name: Nilda Iris Fernández
- Born: 21 August 1946 (age 79) Floresta, Buenos Aires, Argentina
- Height: 1.53 m (5 ft 0 in)
- Weight: 50 kg (110 lb)

Sport
- Sport: Athletics
- Event(s): 800 metres, 1500 metres
- Club: San Lorenzo de Almagro
- Coached by: Gilberto Miori

Nilda Iris Fernández (born 21 August 1946) is a retired Argentine middle-distance runner. She won several medals at continental level. In 1979, she became the first Argentine woman to compete in the marathon. She also held several national records.

== International competitions ==
Year	Competition	Venue	Position	Event	Notes
Representing Argentina
1967	South American Championships	Buenos Aires, Argentina	4th	800 m	2:26.6
1969	South American Championships	Quito, Ecuador	2nd	800 m	2:18.4
1971	Pan American Games	Cali, Colombia	6th	800 m	2:14.31
1971	South American Championships	Lima, Peru	3rd	800 m	2:13.5
1974	South American Championships	Santiago, Chile	3rd	1500 m	4:41.7
1975	South American Championships	Rio de Janeiro, Brazil	2nd	1500 m	4:31.9
1975	Pan American Games	Mexico City, Mexico	10th (h)	800 m	2:18.68

== Personal bests ==
Outdoor

- 800 metres – 2:12.6h (Lomas de Zamora 1971; former NR)
- 1500 metres – 4:31.9h (Rio de Janeiro 1975)
- 2000 metres – 6:47.6h (Buenos Aires 1978)
- 3000 metres – 9:54.6h (Villa Domínico 1978; former NR)
- 5000 metres – 17:58.2h (Buenos Aires 1977; former NR)
- Marathon – 2:58:31 (Waldniel 1979; former NR)

Indoor

- 800 metres – 2:13.1h (La Coruña 1971)
- 1500 metres – 4:42.3h (Madrid 1971)
