= Margaret Beacham =

British middle-distance runner

Personal information
- Born: 28 September 1946 (age 79)

Sport
- Sport: Middle-distance running
- Event: 1500 metres
Medal record
Women's athletics
Representing Great Britain
European Indoor Championships
Gold medal – first place	1971 Sofia	1500 m

Margaret Beacham (née Moir; born 28 September 1946) is a British female former middle-distance runner. Her greatest achievement was a gold medal in the 1500 metres at the 1971 European Athletics Indoor Championships, where she held off Soviet athlete Lyudmila Bragina (Olympic champion a year later) to set a world indoor best of 4:17.2 minutes.

At national level, she first came to prominence with a runner-up finish in the mile run at the 1967 AAA Indoor Championships. She was runner-up again over 1500 m in 1970 before going on to win the national title in 1971, as well as an 800 metres title in 1971. She was twice a winner at the South of England Championships, taking the 1970 800 m title and 1500 m title in 1972.

Granddaughter of Gunner Moir, British Heavyweight Boxing Champion, who fought for the World title against Canadian Tommy Burns in 1907.

== International competitions ==
Year	Competition	Venue	Position	Event	Notes
1971	European Indoor Championships	Sofia, Bulgaria	1st	1500 m	4:17.2 WR

== National titles ==
- AAA Indoor Championships
  - 800 m: 1972
  - 1500 m: 1971

== See also ==
- List of European Athletics Indoor Championships medalists (women)
