= Anna Mushkina =

Soviet Athlete (born 1913)

Anna Petrovna Mushkina
Sport
- Sport: Running
- Event: 1500 meters

Anna Mushkina was a Soviet runner who held the world record in the 1500m in the era before the international body for the sport, the IAAF (now World Athletics) recognised the event for record purposes by women.

== Career ==
Mushkina twice achieved the women's world record for 1500 m:

- 19 August 1927 with a time of 5:18.2 in Moscow, Soviet Union.
- 16 September 1934 with a time of 5:07.0 in Alma-Ata, Soviet Union.

Mushkina also won medals in the Athletics Championships of the Soviet Union:

- Silver in the 1500 m in 1938.
- Bronze in the 800 m in 1938.
- Bronze in the 800 m in 1927.
