= Yevdokiya Vasilyeva =

Soviet Athlete (born 1916)

Yvedokiya Mikhaylovna Vasilyeva
Personal information
- Born: 14 March 1916

Sport
- Sport: Running
- Event: 1500 meters

Yevdokiya Vasilyeva was a Soviet runner who held the world record in multiple middle-distance events (800m, 1000m, 1500m, 2000m and 3x800m relay) between 1936 and 1950, in the era just before and after the Soviet Union joined the international body for the sport, the IAAF (now World Athletics), in 1948 and some of the events she competed in were recognised by the IAAF for record purposes.

As such, she is recognised as one of the pioneers of women's middle-distance running.

== Career ==
Vasilyeva achieved the women's world record for 800 m:

- 9 September 1938 with a time of 2:15.3 in Kharkov, Soviet Union.
- 5 August 1943 with a time of 2:12.0 in Moscow, Soviet Union.
- 17 July 1950 with a time of 2:13.0 in Moscow, Soviet Union.

Vasilyeva achieved the women's world record for 1000 m:

- 23 August 1936 with a time of 2:58.4 in Moscow, Soviet Union.
- An unknown date in 1940 with a time of 2:58.1 in Moscow, Soviet Union.
- 7 July 1940 of 2:57.1 n Moscow, Soviet Union.
- 10 August 1943 with a time of 2:56.9 in Moscow, Soviet Union.
- 16 July 1944 with a time of 2:52.6 in Moscow, Soviet Union.

Vasilyeva achieved the women's world record for 1500 m:

- 30 July 1936 with a time of 4:47.2 in Moscow, Soviet Union.
- 13 September 1937 with a time of 4:45.2 in Moscow, Soviet Union.
- 17 August 1944 with a time of 4:38.0 in Moscow, Soviet Union.

Vasilyeva achieved the women's world record for 2000 m:

- 24 August 1937 with a time of 6:42.0 in Moscow, Soviet Union.

Vasilyeva was also a member of teams that achieved the women's world record for the 3x800 m relay:

- 7 June 1935 with a time of 7:29.3 in Moscow, Soviet Union.
- 24 August 1936 with a time of 7:08.1 in Moscow, Soviet Union.
- 23 July 1944 with a time of 6:55.7 in Moscow, Soviet Union.
- 13 September 1949 with a time of 6:54.0 in Moscow, Soviet Union.
- 28 October 1949 with a time of 6:53.8 in Tbilisi, Soviet Union.
- 24 July 1950 with a time of 6:49.6 in Moscow, Soviet Union.

Note 1: The IAAF (now World Athletics) did not recognise the following events for record purposes by women until the following dates: 800m in 1928; 1000m in 1972; 1500m in 1967 and 2000m in 1984.

Note 2: The Soviet Union did not join the IAAF until 1948.

Note 3: Due to the above, only the last 800m mark and the two latest marks in the relay are considered ratified world records by World Athletics. All the other marks are considered unratified.

Vasilyeva also won medals in the Athletics Championships of the Soviet Union:

- Bronze in the 400 m in 1935
- Gold in the 800 m in 1937.
- Bronze in the 400 m, Gold in the 800 m and Gold in the 1500 m in 1938.
- Silver in the 400 m, Gold in the 800 m and Gold in the 1500 m in 1943.
- Gold in the 800 m and Gold in the 1500 m in 1944.
- Gold in the 800 m and Gold in the 1500 m in 1945.
- Gold in the 800 m and Gold in the 1500 m in 1949.
- Bronze in the 800 m and Silver in the 1500 m in 1950.
- Gold in the 1500 m in 1951.

The total number of medals she has won is one of the highest totals for any Soviet athlete at those championships.

Vasliyeva was a dominant force in Soviet middle distance running for nearly two decades in an era when major international championships were scarce and the events scheduled at those events for women were fewer than today.
