= Marleen Verheuen =

Belgian middle-distance runner

Personal information
- Nationality: Belgian
- Born: 31 December 1954 (age 71)

Sport
- Sport: Middle-distance running
- Event: 800 metres

Marleen Verheuen (born 31 December 1954) is a Belgian middle-distance runner. She competed in the women's 800 metres at the 1972 Summer Olympics.
