= Terry Crawford (track coach) =

American track coach

Personal information
- Occupation: Track coach
- Employer: USA Track and Field

Terry Hull Crawford is an American athletics coach.

== Early life ==
Crawford attended Greeneville High (of Greeneville, Tennessee) and studied at the University of Tennessee as an undergraduate, graduating in 1970, and as a graduate student, graduating in 1972.

== Career ==
In 1974, she became a coach at the University of Tennessee. This was after Title IX (a measure to end sex-based discrimination) was enacted on 23 June 1972 and saw the introduction of a women's athletics program at the university. In 1981 she won their first ever national title in the Association for Intercollegiate Athletics for Women championships (AiAW).

This followed an athletics career where she finished 7th in the final of the 400m at the 1968 United States Olympic Trials and 5th in a qualifying heat in the 800m at the 1972 Olympic Trials. Crawford also competed in the 800m at the 1971 Pan American Games where she finished fourth, and at the 1970 World Student Games where she competed in the heats of the 800m. During her career, Crawford competed for the Knoxville Track Club.

In 1984, Crawford joined the University of Texas as a women's athletics coach. She remained there until 1992.

Crawford later served as a cross country coach at Cal Poly, where she coached both the men's and women's teams, later becoming their director of track & field.

In 1988, she was chosen to be the Head Women's Track & Field Coach for the United States at the 1988 Seoul Olympics.

Crawford later left Cal Poly in 2009 to become the Director of Coaching at United States Track and Field.

== Awards ==
In 2024, Crawford was awarded the USA Track & Field Legend Coach Award, the first woman to be so honoured.

She is also a member of the following Hall of Fames:

- Greeneville High
- University of Tennessee Athletics Hall of Fame
- University of Texas, Longhorns Women's Hall of Fame
- United States Track & Field and Cross Country Coaches Association (USTFCCCA)

In 2009, the USTFCCCA named an award in Crawford's honour, the Terry Crawford Program of the Year Award.

In 2022, on the 50th anniversary of the enactment of Title IX, Greenville Middle School named its athletics track the 'Terry Hull Crawford Track'.

The USATF has also named their Distinguished Female in Coaching Award in Crawford's honour.
