= 1980 European Athletics Indoor Championships – Women's 1500 metres =

The women's 1500 metres event at the 1980 European Athletics Indoor Championships was held on 2 March in Sindelfingen.

== Results ==
Rank	Name	Nationality	Time	Notes
1st place, gold medalist(s)	Tamara Koba	Soviet Union	4:12.5	
2nd place, silver medalist(s)	Anna Bukis	Poland	4:13.1	
3rd place, bronze medalist(s)	Mary Purcell	Ireland	4:14.2	
4	Natalya Kuznetsova	Soviet Union	4:14.4	
5	Sandra Arthurton	Great Britain	4:23.1	
	Vera Steiert	West Germany	DNF	
