= Tamara Koba =

Ukrainian athlete (born 1957)

Personal information
- Born: 24 February 1957 (age 69)

Sport
- Sport: Track and field
Medal record
Representing Soviet Union
European Indoor Championships
Gold medal – first place	1980 Sindelfingen	1500 m

Tamara Koba (born 24 February 1957) is a Ukrainian former middle- and long-distance runner who competed for Ukraine and the Soviet Union. She was a gold medallist at the European Athletics Indoor Championships in 1980. Koba represented Ukraine at the World Championships in Athletics in 1995 and at the IAAF World Cross Country Championships in 1994 and 1995.

== Career ==
Koba began her career as a track specialist in her early twenties. She was the 1500 metres gold medallist at the 1980 European Athletics Indoor Championships on her major international debut. She achieved a lifetime best of 4:01.66 minutes for that event in July 1981. After a break from competition, she returned in her thirties and began to make an impact at national level in 1989 with runner-up finishes at the Brothers Znamensky Memorial and both the 3000 metres and 5000 metres at the Soviet Athletics Championships (behind Tatyana Pozdnyakova). The following year, a win at the Brothers Znamensky Memorial and third place at the national championships brought her selection for the Goodwill Games, where she placed ninth in the 5000 m.

Koba made most of her international appearances in the mid 1990s for Ukraine. She was a bronze medallist in the 10,000 metres at the 1993 European Cup, though her selection for that event at the 1993 World Championships in Athletics was brought to a halt due to injury. In 1994 she was a member of the national team for the Yokohama Women's Ekiden, 1994 IAAF World Cross Country Championships and 1994 European Cross Country Championships (placing tenth at the latter). She led the rankings for the Ukrainian women at the 1995 IAAF World Cross Country Championships in 60th place and took the 5000 m bronze at the 1995 European Cup. She was eliminated in the heats in her final major international appearance, at the 1995 World Championships in Athletics 5000 m race.

In her later career, Koba moved into road running, competing in a variety of lower level races in Germany, Austria and the Netherlands and regularly placing within the top five of those competitions. She retired from competition in her late forties.

She was a one-time national champion, being the inaugural winner of the 5000 metres women's race at the Ukrainian Athletics Championships in 1995. Her winning time of 15:41.08 minutes remained unsurpassed until Tatyana Belovol's 2001 victory.

== International competitions ==
Year	Competition	Venue	Position	Event	Notes
1980	European Indoor Championships	Sindelfingen, West Germany	1st	1500 m	4:12.5
1990	Goodwill Games	Seattle, United States	9th	5000 m	16:18.95
1993	European Cup	Rome, Italy	3rd	10,000 m	32:39.50
1993	World Championships	Stuttgart, Germany	—	10,000 m	DNS
1994	IAAF World Cross Country Championships	Budapest, Hungary	42nd	Senior race	21:42
1994	IAAF World Cross Country Championships	Budapest, Hungary	12th	Senior team	214 pts
1994	European Cross Country Championships	Alnwick, United Kingdom	10th	Senior race	14:51
1995	World Cross Country Championships	Durham, United Kingdom	60th	Senior race	21:49
1995	World Cross Country Championships	Durham, United Kingdom	16th	Senior team	306 pts
1995	European Cup	Villeneuve d'Ascq, France	3rd	5000 m	15:20.97
1995	World Championships	Gothenburg, Sweden	12th (heats)	5000 m	15:53.67

== See also ==
- List of European Athletics Indoor Championships medalists (women)
