= Margrit Hess =

Swiss middle-distance runner

Personal information
- Nationality: Swiss
- Born: 23 May 1947 (age 79)

Sport
- Sport: Middle-distance running
- Event: 1500 metres

Margrit Hess (born 23 May 1947) is a Swiss middle-distance runner. She competed in the women's 1500 metres at the 1972 Summer Olympics.
