= Angela Ramello =

Italian middle-distance runner

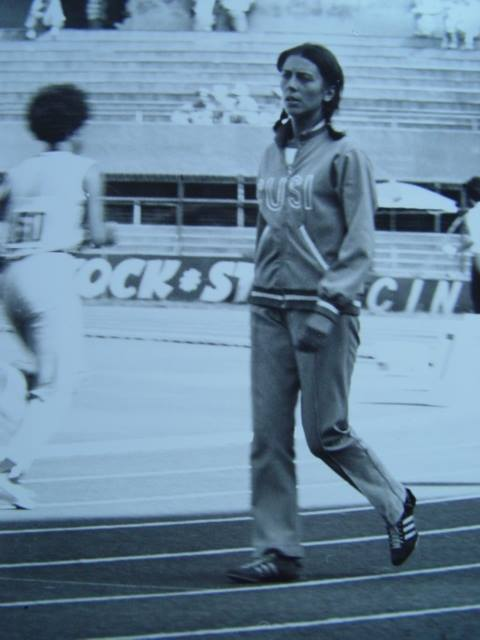

Personal information
- National team: Italy (21 caps 1966-1975)
- Born: 8 January 1944 Alba, Italy
- Died: 28 July 2004 (aged 60) Turin, Italy
- Height: 1.63 m (5 ft 4 in)
- Weight: 53 kg (117 lb)

Sport
- Country: Italy
- Sport: Athletics
- Events: Middle-distance running; Cross country running
- Club: Snia Milano

Achievements and titles
- Personal best: 1500 m: 4:36.6 (1969)

Angela Ramello (8 January 1944 - 28 July 2004) was an Italian female middle-distance runner and cross-country runner who competed at individual senior level at the World Athletics Cross Country Championships (1975).

== Biography ==
Ramello finished 7th at the 1971 European Athletics Indoor Championships – Women's 1500 metres.

== Achievements ==
Year	Competition	Venue	Position	Event	Time	Notes
1969	European Championships	(Greece) Athens	Heat	1500 m	4:36.6	
1971	European Championships	(Finland) Helsinki	SF	800 m	2:07.5	
1971	European Championships	(Finland) Helsinki	Heat	1500 m	4:30.3	
1971	European Indoor Championships	(Bulgaria) Sofia	7th	1500 m	4:27.3	

== National titles ==
She won five national championships at individual senior level.

- Italian Athletics Championships
  - 800 m: 1971
  - 1500 m: 1969
- Italian Athletics Indoor Championships
  - 800 m: 1970, 1975
- Italian Cross Country Championships
  - Long race: 1972
