= Nina Morgunova =

Soviet middle-distance runner

Personal information
- Born: 21 April 1951 (age 75)

Sport
- Sport: Middle-distance running
- Event: 800 metres
Medal record
Women's Athletics
Representing the Soviet Union
Summer Universiade
Gold medal – first place	1975 Rome	800 metres

Nina Morgunova (born 21 April 1951) is a retired female middle-distance runner who represented the Soviet Union in the 1970s. She set her personal best in the women's 1,500 metres (4:06.0) on 1975-09-07 at a meet in Moscow.

She competed in the women's 800 metres at the 1972 Summer Olympics.
