= Inger Knutsson =

Swedish middle-distance runner

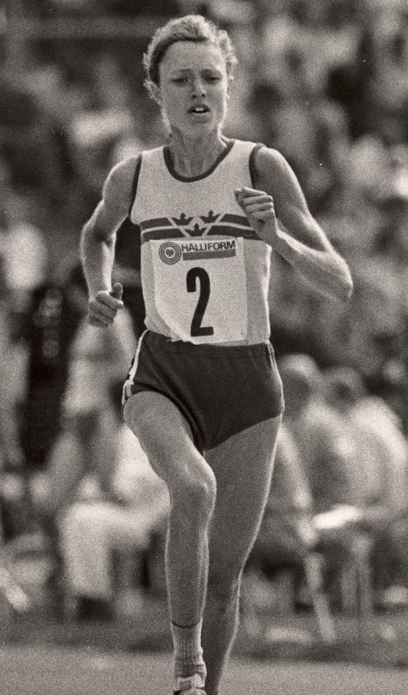

Personal information
- Nationality: Swedish
- Born: 8 May 1955 (age 71) Nynäshamn, Sweden
- Height: 169 cm (5 ft 7 in)
- Weight: 42 kg (93 lb)

Sport
- Sport: Athletics
- Event: Middle-distance running
- Club: Nynäshamns IF

Achievements and titles
- Personal best: 4.07.47 (1973)

Inger Knutsson (later Stålhandske; born 8 May 1955) is a Swedish middle-distance runner who competed at the 1972 Summer Olympics.

== Biography ==
At the 1972 Olympics Games in Munich, she represented Sweden in the 1500 m event but failed to reach the final.

Knutsson won the British WAAA Championships title in the 3,000 metres event at the 1973 WAAA Championships.
