= Chereno Maiyo =

Kenyan middle-distance runner

Personal information
- Nationality: Kenyan
- Born: 2 March 1954 (age 72)

Sport
- Sport: Middle-distance running
- Event: 800 metres

Chereno Maiyo (born 2 March 1954) is a Kenyan middle-distance runner. She competed in the women's 800 metres at the 1972 Summer Olympics.
