= Anne-Marie Nenzell =

Swedish middle-distance runner

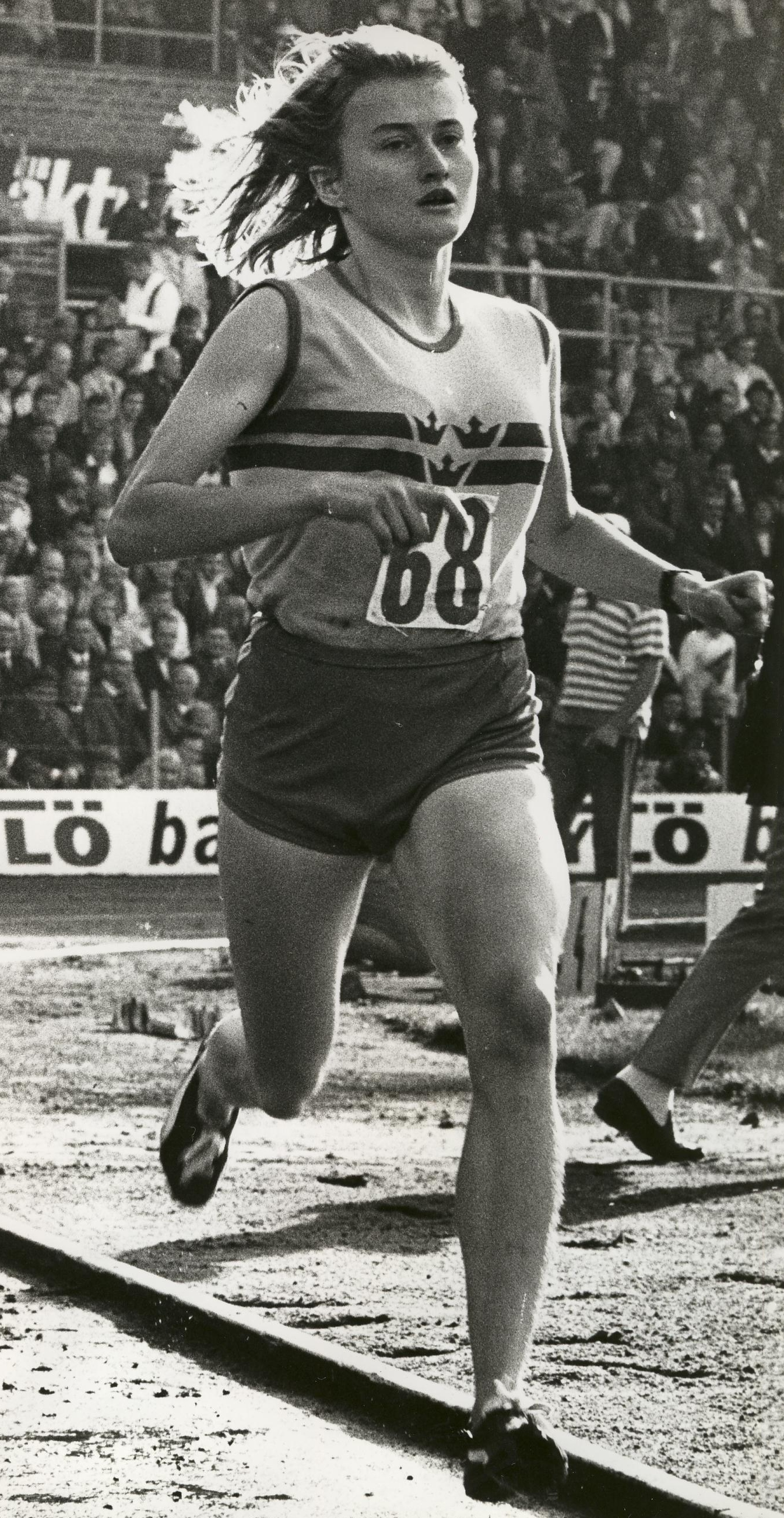

Personal information
- Born: 29 May 1949 (age 77) Bromma, Sweden
- Height: 165 cm (5 ft 5 in)
- Weight: 55 kg (121 lb)

Sport
- Sport: Athletics
- Event(s): 800 m, 1500 m
- Club: IFK Sundsvall

Achievements and titles
- Personal best(s): 800 m – 2:03.5 (1970); 1500 m – 4:15.2 (1972)

Anne-Marie Gustafsdotter Nenzell (born 29 May 1949) is a Swedish retired middle-distance runner. She placed seventh in the 800 m and eighth in the 1500 m at the 1969 European Championships and competed in the 1500 m event at the 1972 Summer Olympics. Nenzell won national titles over 800 m in 1969–70 and over 1500 m in 1969, and set eight national records in these events in 1969–1972. After retiring from competitions she worked as an athletics functionary.
