= Nijolė Sabaitė =

Lithuanian middle-distance runner (born 1950)

Personal information
- Born: Nijolė Razienė; August 12, 1950 (age 75) Raseiniai, Lithuanian SSR
Medal record
Women's athletics
Representing Soviet Union
Olympic Games
Silver medal – second place	1972 Munich	800 m
Summer Universiade
Silver medal – second place	1973 Moscow	800 m

Nijolė Sabaitė (née Razienė, born August 12, 1950 in Raseiniai, Lithuanian SSR) is a retired Lithuanian middle distance runner who represented internationally the USSR. She trained at VSS Nemunas in Vilnius.

Sabaitė began athletics in 1967 and was a member of the USSR National Team since 1970. She competed mainly in the 800 metres, and won an Olympic silver medal in 1972, between Germans Hildegard Falck (gold) and Gunhild Hoffmeister (bronze). She also won 800m silver at the 1973 Summer Universiade behind Lilyana Tomova from Bulgaria, studying in Vilnius Pedagogical Institute. In 1972 she was awarded the Order of the Badge of Honor.
