= Pat Lowe-Cropper =

British middle-distance runner (born 1943)

Pat Cropper née Lowe
Personal information
- Nationality: British (English)
- Born: 15 September 1943 (age 82) Leicester, England
- Height: 165 cm (5 ft 5 in)
- Weight: 52 kg (115 lb)

Sport
- Sport: Middle-distance running
- Event: 800 metres
- Club: Birchfield Harriers
Medal record
Women's athletics
Representing Great Britain
European Championships
Gold medal – first place	1969 Athens	4 × 400 metres relay
Silver medal – second place	1971 Helsinki	800 metres
Representing England
British Commonwealth Games
Silver medal – second place	1970 Edinburgh	800 metres

Patricia Barbara Cropper, née Lowe MBE (born 15 September 1943) is a British retired middle-distance runner. She competed in the 800 metres at the 1968 Summer Olympics and the 1972 Summer Olympics. She was appointed MBE in the 1974 Birthday Honours.

== Biography ==
Lowe who raced for Birchfield Harriers represented England at the 1966 British Empire and Commonwealth Games in Kingston, Jamaica.

At the 1968 Olympic Games in Mexico City, she represented Great Britain in the 800 metres event.

Lowe became the national 800 metres champion after winning the British WAAA Championships title at the 1969 WAAA Championships. The following year Lowe won a silver medal in the 800 metres at the 1970 British Commonwealth Games in Edinburgh, Scotland.

In July 1971, Lowe finished third Canadian Abby Hoffman at the 1971 WAAA Championships and then later that year Lowe married fellow Birchfield Harriers athlete Dave Cropper and competed under her married name thereafter.

Cropper finished second behind Mary Tracey at the 1972 WAAA Championships before competing in her second Olympics Games, this time representing Great Britain in Munich.

Cropper appeared at a third consecutive Commonwealth Games at the 1974 British Commonwealth Games in Christchurch, New Zealand.
