= Claire Walsh (runner) =

Irish middle-distance runner

Personal information
- Nationality: Irish
- Born: 27 May 1942 (age 83)
- Height: 160 cm (5 ft 3 in)
- Weight: 51 kg (112 lb)

Sport
- Sport: Middle-distance running
- Event: 800 metres
- Club: Clonliffe Harriers

Claire Walsh (born 27 May 1942) is an Irish retired middle-distance runner who competed at the 1972 Summer Olympics.

== Biography ==
Walsh who ran for Clonliffe Harriers finished second behind Sheila Carey in the 800 metres event at the British 1970 WAAA Championships, setting an Irish record in the process with a time of 2.04.9.

At the 1972 Olympics Games in Munich, she represented Ireland in the women's 800 metres competition.

Walsh finished second behind Jannette Roscoe at the 1973 WAAA Championships.
