= Anna Zimina =

Soviet middle-distance runner

Personal information
- Nationality: Soviet
- Born: 8 July 1939 (age 87)

Sport
- Sport: Middle-distance running
- Event: 800 metres

Anna Zimina (born 8 July 1939) is a Soviet middle-distance runner. She competed in the women's 800 metres at the 1968 Summer Olympics. She was a medalist at the European Championships.
