= Christa Merten =

German runner

Personal information
- Nationality: West German
- Born: 14 October 1944 Dobbertin, Germany
- Died: 1 July 1986 (aged 41) Marbella, Spain

Sport
- Sport: Athletics
- Event: middle-distance
- Club: Bayer 04 Leverkusen
Medal record
Women's athletics
Representing West Germany
European Indoor Championships
Silver medal – second place	1970 Vienna	Medley relay

Christa Merten (née Basche; 14 October 1944 – 1 July 1986), was a West German athlete and Olympian who competed for West Germany in the 1960s and 70s in the 800, 1500 and 3000 meter runs and in cross country running and competed at the 1972 Summer Olympics.

== Biography ==
Merten finished second behind Rita Ridley in the 1500 metres event at the British 1970 WAAA Championships.

On 31 July 1971, she set a world record in Lübeck with Ellen Tittel, Sylvia Schenk, and Hildegard Falck in the 800 meter relay. Merten started the 1500 and 800 metres at the 1971 European Athletics Championships, but failed to reach the finals. She won the silver medal with the relay in the 2000 metres medley relay with Elfgard Schittenhelm, Heidi Gerhard and Jutta von Haase with a time of 5:01.1 minutes at the 1970 European Athletics Indoor Championships.

At the 1972 Olympics Games in Munich, she represented West Germany in the 1500 metres event. Also in 1972 at the 1972 European Athletics Indoor Championships, she earned fourth place at the 800 metres.

A German Championship of the Federal Republic, she won with the 3 × 800 m season of VfL Wolfsburg, 1970 in the short cross-country race, 1965, 1966 and 1970 with the cross-country team and 1973 in the 3000 meter run (9:23.0 min). From 1970 to 1973, she broke four German records of the Federal Republic in the 1000, 1500 and 3000 meter run.

Merten was 1.68 m tall and weighed 54 kg in her time as an active athlete. Until 1964, she belonged to the sports club SC Charlottenburg, then VfL Wolfsburg, then ASV Köln and finally from 1971 onward, Bayer 04 Leverkusen.

She committed suicide in 1986.
