= Tonka Petrova =

Bulgarian middle-distance runner

Personal information
- Born: 1 February 1947 (age 79) Yambol, Bulgaria

Sport
- Sport: Track and field
Medal record
Representing Bulgaria
European Indoor Championships
Gold medal – first place	1974 Gothenburg	1500 m
Silver medal – second place	1973 Rotterdam	1500 m
Silver medal – second place	1974 Gothenburg	4×392 m
Bronze medal – third place	1971 Sofia	4×400 m
Summer Universiade
Bronze medal – third place	1973 Moscow	1500 m

Tonka Ivanova Petrova (Bulgarian: Тонка Ивановна Петрова; born 1 February 1947) is a Bulgarian former middle-distance runner.

She won a silver medal at European Indoor Championships in the 1500 metres run in Rotterdam in 1973. In 1974, she won a gold medal at the European Indoor Championships' 1500 m run in Gothenburg, and a silver medal in a 4 x 392 metres relay race with Bulgaria. She also competed in the women's 1500 metres at the 1972 Summer Olympics.
