= Arda Kalpakian =

Lebanese athlete (born 1944)

Personal information
- Native name: أردا كالباكيان
- National team: Lebanon
- Born: April 11, 1944 (age 81)

Sport
- Country: Lebanon
- Sport: Athletics
- Updated on 20 July 2017

Arda Kalpakian (Arabic: أردا كالباكيان; born April 11, 1944) is a Lebanese former athlete. She represented Lebanon in the 1972 Summer Olympics in Munich and was eliminated after she came in last in her heat in round one.

Kalpakian is of Armenian descent. She and Ani Jane Mugrditchian were the only female participants of the 18 athletes competing for Lebanon, as well as the first two women to represent Lebanon at the Olympics. She was selected by the Lebanese Sports Editors Association as the 1974 female athlete of the year.
