= Mary Tracey-Purcell =

Irish middle-distance runner (born 1949)

Mary Purcell née Tracey
Personal information
- Nationality: Irish
- Born: 22 May 1949 (age 77) Ireland
- Height: 165 cm (5 ft 5 in)
- Weight: 50 kg (110 lb)

Sport
- Sport: Middle-distance running
- Event: 800 metres
- Club: Guinness AC; Crusaders AC
Medal record
Women's athletics
Representing Ireland
European Indoor Championships
Bronze medal – third place	1980 Sindelfingen	1500 m

Mary Purcell née Tracey (born 22 May 1949) is an Irish middle-distance runner who competed at the 1972 Summer Olympics and 1976 Summer Olympics.

== Biography ==
Tracey won the British WAAA Championships title in the 800 metres event at the 1972 WAAA Championships. Shortly afterwards at the 1972 Olympics Games in Munich, she represented Ireland in the women's 800 metres competition. Tracey retained the British WAAA title at the 1973 WAAA Championships.

Tracey married and took her married name Purcell thereafter and finished second to Lesley Kiernan at the 1974 WAAA Championships before winning the 3000 metres title at the 1975 WAAA Championships and 1976 WAAA Championships.

At the 1976 Olympics Games in Montreal, purcell represented Ireland in the women's 800 metres.
