= Wenche Sørum =

Norwegian middle-distance runner

Personal information
- Nationality: Norwegian
- Born: 10 July 1951 (age 74) Oslo, Norway

Sport
- Sport: Track and Field
- Event: 1500 metres

Achievements and titles
- Olympic finals: 1 (1972)

Wenche Sørum (born 10 July 1951) is a Norwegian middle distance runner. She was born in Oslo. She competed in 1,500 metres at the 1972 Summer Olympics in Munich, reaching the semi-finals.
