= Annelise Damm Olesen =

Danish middle-distance runner

Personal information
- Nationality: Danish
- Born: 2 January 1942 (age 84)

Sport
- Sport: Middle-distance running
- Event: 800 metres
Medal record
Women's athletics
Representing Denmark
European Championships
Silver medal – second place	1969 Athens	800 m

Annelise Damm Olesen (born 2 January 1942) is a Danish retired middle-distance runner. She competed in the 800 metres at the 1968 Summer Olympics and the 1972 Summer Olympics.

== International championships ==
- 1972 Summer Olympics – 800 metres, heats: 2:01.77; semifinal: 2:04.19
- 1970 European Indoor Championships – 800 metres, 7th place: 2:14.5
- 1969 European Championships – 800 metres, Silver: 2:02.6
- 1969 European Championships – 4 × 400 metres: 3:36.2
- 1969 Nordic Championships – pentathlon, Bronze: 4419 points
- 1968 Summer Olympics – 800 metres, heats: 2:09.01

== Personal bests ==
- 400 metres: 53.6 (1969)
- 800 metres: 2:01.77 (1972)
- 1500 metres: 4:20.2 (1972)
- 80 metres hurdles: 11.5 (1963)
- 100 metres hurdles: 13.8 (1972)
