= Lyudmila Bragina =

Russian middle-distance runner

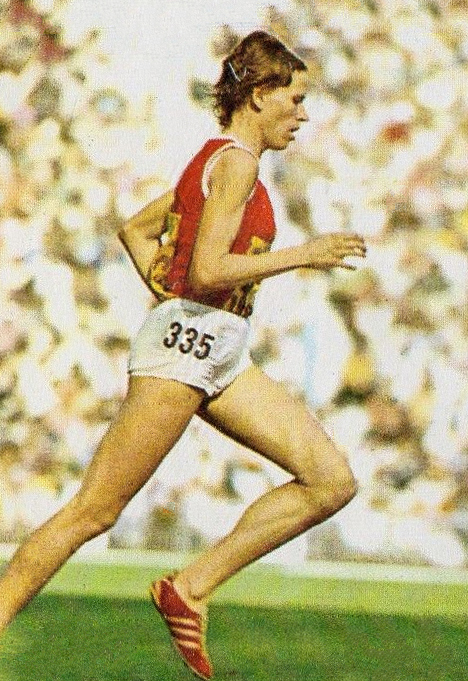
- Lyudmila Bragina in 1972

Personal information
- Born: Lyudmila Ivanovna Bragina; 24 July 1943 (age 83) Sverdlovsk, Russian SFSR, Soviet Union
- Height: 1.65 m (5 ft 5 in)
- Weight: 57 kg (126 lb)

Sport
- Sport: Athletics
- Events: 1500 m, 3000 m
- Club: Dynamo Krasnodar

Achievements and titles
- Personal bests: 1500 m – 4:01.38 (1972); 3000 m – 8:27.12 (1976)
Medal record
Women's athletics
Representing the Soviet Union
Olympic Games
Gold medal – first place	1972 Munich	1500 m
European Championships
Silver medal – second place	1974 Rome	3000 m
European Indoor Championships
Silver medal – second place	1970 Vienna	800 m
Silver medal – second place	1971 Sofia	1500 m
Silver medal – second place	1972 Grenoble	1500 m

Lyudmila Ivanovna Bragina (Russian: Людмила Ивановна Брагина, born 24 July 1943) is a retired Soviet and Russian middle-distance runner. She competed for the Soviet Union in the 1500 m at the 1972 and 1976 Olympics; she won the event in 1972 and finished fifth in 1976. In July 1972 she set a new 1500 m world record of 4:06.9, at the Soviet championships, and then progressively improved it in round 1 (4:06.47), the semi-finals (4:05.07), and the final (4:01.38), of the 1972 Olympics. The same year she was awarded the Order of the Red Banner of Labour. She also set three world records in the 3000 m: 8:53.0 in 1972, 8:52.74 in 1974 and 8:27.12 in 1976. At the European Championships, Bragina won four silver medals: in the 3,000 m outdoors (1974), and in the 800 m (1970) and 1,500 m indoors (1971–72).

In 1960 Bragina started training in the high jump, and changed to running only in 1964. She had a career-threatening bout of pneumonia in 1966. After recovering she moved to the south of Russia, in Krasnodar, where she later worked as an athletics coach.

Records
Preceded by (East Germany) Karin Burneleit	Women's 1500 m world record holder 1972-07-18 — 1976-06-28	Succeeded by (Soviet Union) Tatyana Kazankina
Preceded by (Italy) Paola Cacchi	Women's 3000 m world record holder 12 August 1972 — 24 June 1975	Succeeded by (Norway) Grete Andersen-Waitz
Preceded by (Norway) Grete Waitz	Women's 3000 m world record holder 7 August 1976 — 25 July 1982	Succeeded by (Soviet Union) Svetlana Ulmasova
Sporting positions
Preceded by (England) Joyce Smith	Women's 3000 m Best Year Performance; 1972	Succeeded by (Italy) Paola Cacchi
Preceded by (Italy) Paola Cacchi	Women's 3000 m Best Year Performance; 1974	Succeeded by (Norway) Grete Waitz
Preceded by (Norway) Grete Waitz	Women's 3000 m Best Year Performance; 1976	Succeeded by (Norway) Grete Waitz
