= Gunhild Hoffmeister =

East German middle-distance runner

- Hoffmeister at the 1972 Olympics

Personal information
- Born: 6 July 1944 (age 82) Forst, Germany
- Height: 172 cm (5 ft 8 in)
- Weight: 56 kg (123 lb)

Sport
- Sport: Athletics
- Events: 800 m, 1500 m
- Club: SC Cottbus

Achievements and titles
- Personal bests: 800 m – 1:58.61 (1976); 1500 m – 4:01.4 (1976)
Medal record
Women's athletics
Representing East Germany
Olympic Games
Silver medal – second place	1972 Munich	1500 m
Silver medal – second place	1976 Montreal	1500 m
Bronze medal – third place	1972 Munich	800 m
European Championships
Gold medal – first place	1974 Rome	1500 m
Silver medal – second place	1971 Helsinki	1500 m
Silver medal – second place	1974 Rome	800 m
European Indoor Championships
Gold medal – first place	1972 Grenoble	800 m
Bronze medal – third place	1974 Gothenburg	800 m
Summer Universiade
Gold medal – first place	1970 Turin	800 m

Gunhild Hoffmeister (born 6 July 1944) is a retired German middle-distance runner. She competed for East Germany at the 1972 and 1976 Olympics and won two silver and one bronze medal, becoming the only German distance runner to win three Olympic medals. Together with Hans Grodotzki, she is the only German runner to win two medals at the same Olympics (excluding those in sprint and multi-events). Her personal best time in 1,500 metres was 4:01.4, achieved in July 1976 in Potsdam. This places her ninth on the German all-time list.

At the European Championships, Hoffmeister won five medals between 1971 and 1974: three outdoors and two indoors. She also won the European Cup in 1973 and placed second in 1970. Domestically, she collected 15 outdoor and two indoor East German titles. She set three world records: in the 1,000 m in 1972 and in two 4 × 800 m relays in 1969 and 1976.

Hoffmeister was a sports teacher by training and after retiring from competitions became deputy chief of the Children and Youth School in Cottbus. She was also active in politics and was a member of East German Parliament in 1971–76. Until the German reunification in 1990, she served as a board member of the East German Sports Federation, and after that worked as a sports rehabilitation therapist in Berlin. Her daughter Kerstin also became a competitive runner.
