= Sylvia Schenk =

German middle-distance runner

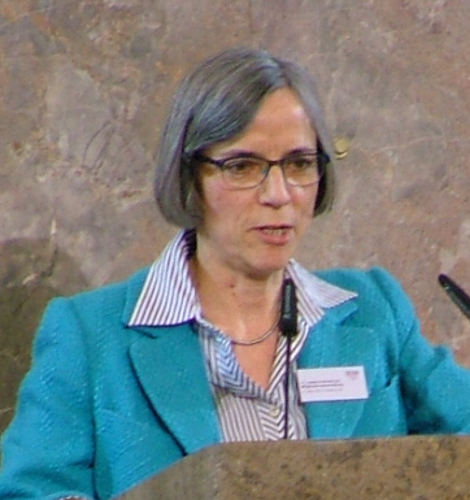
- Sylvia Schenk in 2015

Personal information
- Nationality: German
- Born: 1 June 1952 (age 74)

Sport
- Sport: Middle-distance running
- Event: 800 metres

Sylvia Schenk (born 1 June 1952) is a German middle-distance runner. She competed in the women's 800 metres at the 1972 Summer Olympics for West Germany.

She served on Frankfurt municipal council from 1989 to 2001.
