= Abby Hoffman =

Canadian track and field athlete

Personal information
- Full name: Abigail Golda Hoffman
- Born: February 11, 1947 (age 79) Toronto, Ontario, Canada
- Height: 175 cm (5 ft 9 in)
- Weight: 57 kg (126 lb)

Sport
- Country: Canada
- Sport: Track and field
Medal record
Women's athletics
Representing Canada
Summer Universiade
Silver medal – second place	1967 Tokyo	800 m
Bronze medal – third place	1965 Budapest	800 m
Pan American Games
Gold medal – first place	1963 São Paulo	800 m
Gold medal – first place	1971 Cali	800 m
Silver medal – second place	1975 Mexico	800 m
Bronze medal – third place	1967 Winnipeg	800 m
Bronze medal – third place	1975 Mexico	1500 m
British Empire and Commonwealth Games
Gold medal – first place	1966 Kingston	880 yards

Abigail Golda Hoffman, OC (born February 11, 1947) is a Canadian former track and field athlete.

== Hockey ==
Hoffman is Jewish, and was born in Toronto. She learned to skate when she was three. In the mid-1950s when she was nine, she wanted to play hockey but there weren't any existing leagues specifically for girls in the Toronto area. As a result her parents registered her in the local boy's league as "Ab Hoffman". Due to her age and the fact that Abby sported a short hair cut, she was not easy to distinguish from the boys. When it was discovered she was a girl, she was no longer allowed to play despite the fact that she had not yet reached the age of puberty. The case went to the Ontario Supreme Court, where she lost in 1956, and the story was covered by Time and Newsweek.

From 1982 until 2008, Hockey Canada's Women's National Championship (sometimes known as the Esso Women's Nationals for sponsorship reasons) was played for a trophy called the Abby Hoffman Cup.

== Track and field ==
After her experiences with hockey, Hoffman participated in competitive swimming and then realized she was particularly suited to track and field, specifically 800-metre running. She competed in four Olympic Games: (1964, 1968, 1972 and 1976), four Pan American Games and two Commonwealth Games and was Canada's flag-bearer at the 1976 Games in Montreal.

Hoffman competed in two summer Universiades in 1965 and 1967, where she took home a bronze medal and a silver medal respectively in the 800 metre event. She won the gold medal in the 880-yard event at the 1966 British Empire and Commonwealth Games.

She finished seventh in the 800 metres at the Mexico Olympics. She finished eighth in the 1972 Munich games where she ran the 800 metres in 2:00.17 seconds to set a Canadian record. She also won gold for the 800-metre race at the 1963 Pan American Games and 1971 Pan American Games and the bronze at the 1967, at the 1975 Games, a silver and a bronze for the 800-metre and the 1500-metre distances.

At the 1969 Maccabiah Games in Israel, she won the women's 800 m run.

== Post-athletics ==
From 1981 to 1991, she was the first woman director general of Sport Canada, a federal government sports agency. In 1981, she was the first Canadian woman elected to the Executive Committee of the Canadian Olympic Committee. From 1980 to 1982, she wrote a fitness column for the Canadian magazine, Chatelaine.

In 1982, she and Maureen McTeer, supported the first women's national championship in ice hockey (known as the Shopper's Drug Mart Women's Nationals). The Abby Hoffman Cup is named in her honour. Since 1995, she has been a council member of the International Association of Athletics Federations. In 2003, she was named senior advisor with Health Canada and is executive co-ordinator of Health Canada's pharmaceutical management strategies. She is currently the assistant deputy minister for the Strategic Policy Branch for Health Canada.

She is also the sister of Paul F. Hoffman, a geologist who has promoted the snowball earth hypothesis.

== Honours ==
In 1982, Hoffman was made an officer of the Order of Canada. In 2004, she was inducted into Canada's Sports Hall of Fame. In 2007, she was inducted into the Jewish Canadian Athletes Hall of Fame. In June 2015, she received an honorary Doctorate of Laws, from her alma mater, the University of Toronto.

From 1982 until 2008, Hockey Canada's Women's National Championship (sometimes known as the Esso Women's Nationals for sponsorship reasons) was played for a trophy called the Abby Hoffman Cup.
