= Vasilena Amzina =

Bulgarian middle-distance runner

Personal information
- Nationality: Bulgarian
- Born: 29 June 1942 Bistritsa, Sofia, Bulgaria
- Died: 19 December 2017 (aged 75) Sofia, Bulgaria

Sport
- Sport: Middle-distance running
- Event: 800 metres
Medal record
Women's athletics
Representing Bulgaria
European Indoor Championships
Bronze medal – third place	1972 Grenoble	1500 m

Vasilena Gerginova Stefinova-Amzina (Bulgarian: Василена Амзина; 29 June 1942 – 19 December 2017) was a Bulgarian middle-distance runner. She competed in the women's 800 metres at the 1972 Summer Olympics.
