= Tamara Pangelova =

Ukrainian middle-distance runner

- Pangelova at the 1972 Olympics

Personal information
- Born: 22 August 1943 (age 82) Poltava, Ukraine
- Height: 166 cm (5 ft 5 in)
- Weight: 57 kg (126 lb)

Sport
- Sport: Athletics
- Event: 1500 m

Achievements and titles
- Personal best: 4:06.45 (1972)
Medal record
Representing the Soviet Union
European Athletics Indoor Championships
Bronze medal – third place	1971 Sofia	1500 m
Gold medal – first place	1972 Grenoble	1500 m

Tamara Pangelova (later Dunaiska, Ukrainian: Тамара Пангелова-Дунайська, born 22 August 1943) is a retired Ukrainian middle-distance runner who specialized in the 1500 m event. She won a bronze medal at the 1971 European Championships and set a world record on 12 March 1972, both indoors. She won a gold medal at the 1972 European indoor championships in Grenoble. Later in 1972 she placed seventh at the Munich Olympics.
