= Paola Pigni =

Italian runner (1945–2021)

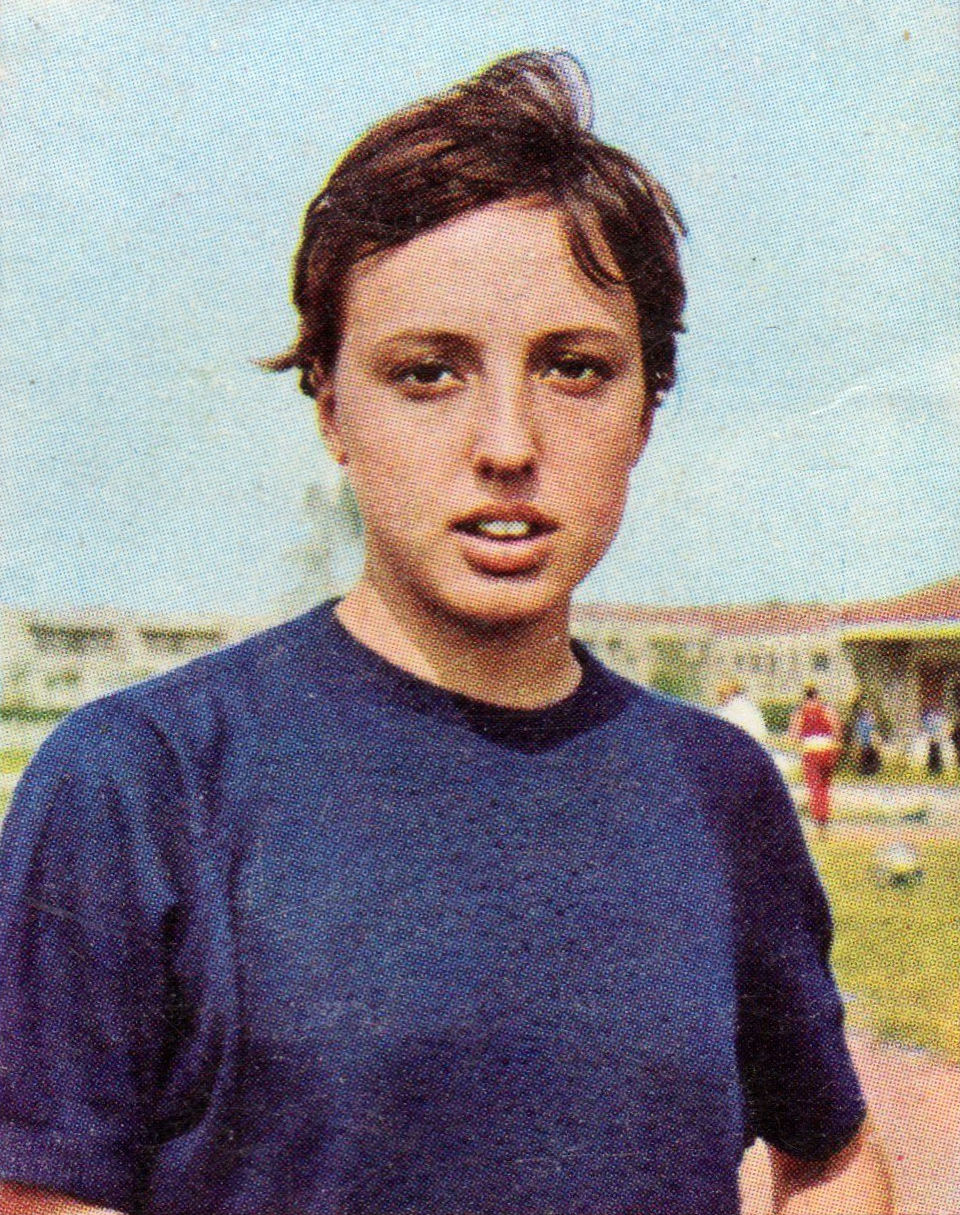
- Paola Pigni in 1966

Personal information
- Nationality: Italian
- Born: 30 December 1945 Milan, Kingdom of Italy
- Died: 11 June 2021 (aged 75) Rome, Italy
- Height: 1.68 m (5 ft 6 in)
- Weight: 55 kg (121 lb)

Sport
- Country: Italy
- Sport: Athletics
- Event: Middle distance running
- Club: Snia Milano

Achievements and titles
- Personal bests: 800 m: 2:01.95 (1975); 1500 m: 4:02.85 (1972)
Medal record
Women's athletics
Representing Italy
Event	1st	2nd	3rd
Olympic Games	0	0	1
European Championships	0	0	1
World Cross Country Championships	2	1	0
Universiade	1	0	0
Mediterranean Games	2	1	0
Total	5	2	2
Olympic Games
Bronze medal – third place	1972 Munich	1500 m
European Championships
Bronze medal – third place	1969 Athens	1500 m
International Cross Country C'ships
Gold medal – first place	1970 Vichy	Individual
World Cross Country Championships
Gold medal – first place	1973 Waregem	Individual
Gold medal – first place	1974 Monza	Individual
Universiade
Gold medal – first place	1973 Moscow	1500 m
Mediterranean Games
Gold medal – first place	1975 Algiers	800 m
Gold medal – first place	1975 Algiers	1500 m
Silver medal – second place	1971 Izmir	1500 m

Paola Pigni (30 December 1945 – 11 June 2021) was an Italian middle- and long-distance runner. She was a three-time world champion in cross country and held the world record over five distance running events on the track, from 1,500m to 10,000m.

== Biography ==
Pigni competed for her native country at the 1972 Summer Olympics in Munich, West Germany, where she won the bronze medal in the women's 1,500 m.

She was the winner of the France version of the 1970 International Cross Country Championships. She followed this up by winning the first two women's titles at the IAAF World Cross Country Championships in 1973 and 1974.

== World records ==
In an era when the popularity of female middle distance running was increasing, Pigni established six world records (those recognized are signed with an asterisk).

- 5000 m: 16:17.4 ( (Italy) Formia, 1 May 1969)
- 5000 m: 15:53.6 ( (Italy) Milan, 2 September 1969)
- 1500 m: 4:12.4 ( (Italy) Milan, 2 December 1969)*
- 10000 m: 35:30.5 ( (Italy) Milan, 9 May 1970)
- 3000 m: 9:09.2 ( (Italy) Formia, 11 May 1972)
- Mile: 4:29.5 ( (Italy) Viareggio, 8 August 1973)*

== Achievements ==
Year	Competition	Venue	Position	Event	Time	Notes
1969	European Championships	(Greece) Athens	3rd	1500 m	4:12:00	NR
1970	International Cross Country Championships	(France) Vichy	1st	3 km	10:38.4	
1972	Olympic Games	(West Germany) Munich	3rd	1500 m	4:02:85	
1973	World Cross Country Championships	(Belgium) Waregem	1st	3.99 km	13:45.2	
1974	World Cross Country Championships	(Italy) Monza	1st	4 km	12:42	

== National titles ==
She won 19 national championships at senior level.

- Italian Athletics Championships
  - 400 m: 1965, 1967 (2)
  - 800 m: 1965, 1966, 1967, 1968, 1969, 1973 (6)
  - 1500 m: 1970, 1972, 1974, 1975 (4)
  - 3000 m: 1974 (1)
  - Cross country running: 1967, 1968, 1969, 1970, 1973, 1974 (6)

== See also ==
- Legends of Italian sport - Walk of Fame
- Italian all-time top lists - 1500 m
- FIDAL Hall of Fame

Records
Preceded by Mia Gommers	Women's 1500 m world record holder 2 July 1969 – 20 September 1969	Succeeded by Jaroslava Jehlickova
Preceded by Ellen Tittel	Women's mile world record holder 8 August 1973 – 21 May 1977	Succeeded by Natalia Mărășescu
Preceded by Lyudmila Bragina	Women's 3000 m Best Year Performance; 1973	Succeeded by Lyudmila Bragina
