= Ellen Tittel =

German middle-distance runner (1948–2023)

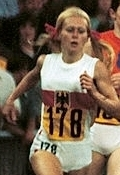
- Tittel at the 1972 Olympics

Personal information
- Born: 28 June 1948 Mühlbach (Müglitztal), Saxony, Soviet occupation zone in Germany
- Died: 7 October 2023 (aged 75)
- Height: 158 cm (5 ft 2 in)
- Weight: 44 kg (97 lb)

Sport
- Sport: Athletics
- Events: 800 m, 1500 m
- Club: Bayer Leverkusen
- Coached by: Gerd Osenberg

Achievements and titles
- Personal bests: 800 m – 2:03.1 (1971); 1500 m – 4:06.65 (1972)
Medal record
Women's athletics
Representing West Germany
European Championships
Bronze medal – third place	1971 Helsinki	1500 m
European Athletics Indoor Championships
Gold medal – first place	1973 Rotterdam	1500 m
Bronze medal – third place	1975 Katowice	1500 m

Ellen Tittel (later Wellmann, later Wessinghage; 28 June 1948 – 7 October 2023) was a West German middle-distance runner who specialized in the 1500 m event. She won the European indoor title in 1973, placing third in 1975, and had another third-place finish at the 1971 European Outdoor Championships. She reached the 1500 m finals at the 1972 and 1976 Summer Olympics, but abandoned the 1972 race due to stomach cramps. In 1971 she helped to set a new world record in the 4 × 800 m relay.

Domestically Tittel set a national record in 1969 and won the national title in 1970–76. In 1975 she was chosen the West German Sportspersonality of the Year.

Tittel won the British WAAA Championships title in the 1500 metres event at the 1972 WAAA Championships.

Tittel was a lawyer by profession. Before turning to athletics she tried gymnastics, but found it too boring. She married two fellow Olympic middle-distance runners, first Paul-Heinz Wellmann, and a few years later Thomas Wessinghage. With Wessinghage she had a son Daniel. She died on 7 October 2023, at the age of 75.

Records
Preceded by Mia Gommers	Women's mile world record holder 20 August 1971 – 8 August 1973	Succeeded by Paola Pigni
Awards
Preceded by Christel Justen	German Sportswoman of the Year; 1975	Succeeded by Rosi Mittermaier
