= Ileana Silai =

Romanian middle-distance runner (1941–2025)

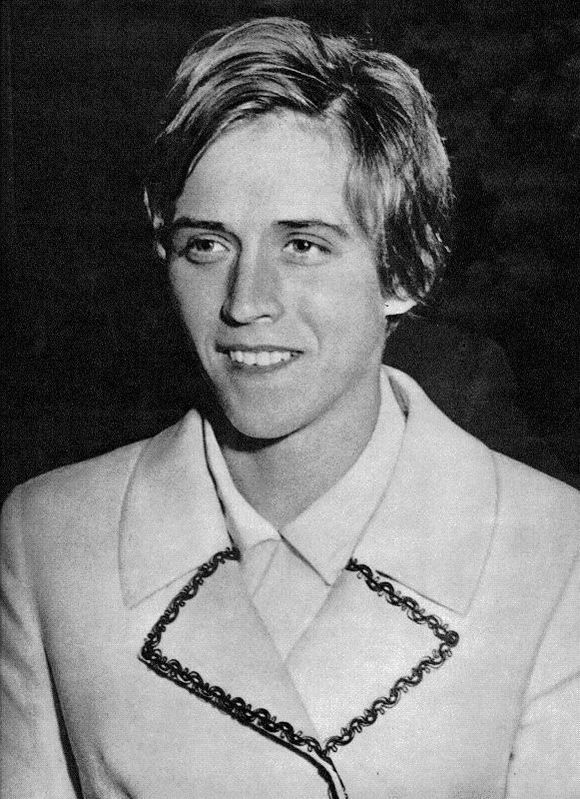
- Silai in the 1960s

Personal information
- Born: 14 October 1941 Kolozsvár, Hungary (now Cluj-Napoca, Romania)
- Died: 27 June 2025 (aged 83)

Sport
- Sport: Athletics
- Events: 400 m, 800 m, 1500 m
- Club: Metalul București

Achievements and titles
- Personal bests: 400 m – 53.6 (1969); 800 m – 1:57.39 (1977); 1500 m – 3:58.5 (1979)
Medal record
Representing Romania
Olympic Games
Silver medal – second place	1968 Mexico City	800 m
European Athletics Indoor Championships
Silver medal – second place	1971 Sofia	800 m
Silver medal – second place	1972 Grenoble	800 m
Gold medal – first place	1978 Milan	1500 m

Ileana Silai, née Ileana Gergely, (14 October 1941 – 27 June 2025) was a Romanian middle-distance runner. She competed in the 800 m at the 1968, 1972, and 1976 Olympics and in the 1500 m at the 1976 and 1980 Olympics. She won a silver over 800 m in 1968. At the European indoor championships, she won silver medals in the 800 metres in 1971 and 1972 and a gold in the 1500 m in 1978.

== Background ==
Silai took up athletics in 1957, following her brother, and first trained in sprint and long jump. She then married and had a break from athletics until 1963. After retiring she moved to Munich, Germany, where her husband worked as an architect and she trained children. From 1991 onwards, she was not involved with sport.

Silai died on 27 June 2025, at the age of 83.

== Doping ==
In 1979, Silai was banned for 18 months for taking anabolic steroids. After 8 months she was reinstated after IAAF President Adriaan Paulen of the Netherlands said that an 18-month suspension in the steroid case would have kept the women out of the Moscow Olympics, which would have constituted "an extra penalty." He said that the IAAF Council had therefore reinstated them for "humane reasons."
