= Karin Krebs =

German middle-distance runner (born 1943)

- Krebs at the 1972 Olympics

Personal information
- Born: 18 August 1943 (age 82) Gumbinnen, Germany
- Height: 167 cm (5 ft 6 in)
- Weight: 51 kg (112 lb)

Sport
- Sport: Athletics
- Event: 1500 m
- Club: SC Dynamo Berlin

Achievements and titles
- Personal best(s): 800 m – 2:00.1 (1971); 1500 m – 4:04.11 (1972)
Medal record
Women's athletics
Representing East Germany
European Championships
| Gold medal – first place | 1971 Helsinki | 1500 m |
European Indoor Championships
| Gold medal – first place | 1968 Madrid | 800 m |
| Silver medal – second place | 1974 Gothenburg | 1500 m |
Summer Universiade
| Bronze medal – third place | 1970 Turin | 800 m |

Karin Krebs, née Burneleit, (18 August 1943) is a retired German middle-distance runner. She won the 800 metres race for East Germany at the 1968 European Indoor Games, but failed to reach the 800 m Olympic final the same year. She then focused on the 1500 m event and won it at the 1971 European Championships, setting a new world record at 4:09.6 minutes. She placed fourth at the 1972 Olympics, and her world record was broken earlier in July 1972 by the future Olympic gold medalist Lyudmila Bragina. Krebs had her last intentional success in 1974 when she won the silver medal over 1500 m at the European Indoor Championships.

Domestically Krebs won the East German 800 m title in 1968 outdoors and in 1966 and 1968 indoors. She also held the national 1500 m indoor title in 1971 and 1974.

While passing the gender test at the 1968 Olympics Krebs learned that she was three-month pregnant. After the 1972 Olympics she married her teammate, long-distance runner Joachim Krebs. Their daughter Nadja (born 1976) also became a runner. Krebs was a horticulturist by profession, but worked for the East German Track and Field Association. After the Unification of Germany in 1990 she became a self-employed sports and event manager.
