= Nikolina Shtereva =

Bulgarian middle-distance runner

Personal information
- Born: 25 January 1955 (age 71) Sofia, Bulgaria

Sport
- Sport: Track and field
Medal record
Representing Bulgaria
Olympic Games
Silver medal – second place	1976 Montreal	800 m
European Indoor Championships
Gold medal – first place	1976 Munich	800 m
Gold medal – first place	1979 Vienna	800 m
Bronze medal – third place	1981 Grenoble	800 m
Summer Universiade
Bronze medal – third place	1975 Rome	800 m

Nikolina Pavlova Shtereva (Bulgarian: Николина Павлова Щерева; born 25 January 1955) is a retired Bulgarian middle-distance runner who specialised in the 800 and 1500 metres. She is best known for her silver medal in 800 metres at the 1976 Summer Olympics, and at the European Indoor Championships she won gold medals in 1976 and 1979 and a bronze medal in 1981. She won fourteen national titles (outdoor; as well as seven indoor) in Bulgaria, and is still the Bulgarian record holder in the 800 metres.

== International career ==
She was born in Sofia, and represented the club CSKA Septemvrisko Zname during her career. In the 1970s and 1980s she was a prolific competitor at the European Indoor Championships. She finished sixth at the 1975 European Indoor Championships, clocking in only 2:20.3 seconds, but then won the gold medal at the 1976 European Indoor Championships. She edged out countrywoman Lilyana Tomova with 0.4 seconds, and Bulgaria almost managed a gold-silver-bronze constellation, but Ivanka Bonova lost the bronze medal to Gisela Klein. She won another gold medal at the 1979 European Indoor Championships, 0.3 seconds ahead of Anita Weiß, and finished sixth at the 1982 European Indoor Championships. She also won the 800 metres event at the 1979 IAAF World Cup.

In winning her medals at the 1976 and 1979 European Indoor Championships, she was a part of a strong tradition of Bulgarian 800 metres runners, who won medals at the European Indoor Championships in 1972, 1973, 1975, 1976, 1977, 1978 and 1979. Other than Shtereva, these medals were taken by Svetla Zlateva (1972), Stefka Yordanova (1973), Rositsa Pekhlivanova (1975), Lilyana Tomova (1976) and Totka Petrova (1977, 1978).

Shtereva also competed in the Olympic Games twice, in 1976 in Montreal and 1980 in Moscow. Both times she competed in both 800 and 1500 metres. In the 1976 Olympic 800 metres event she started by finishing second in the initial heat with 2:01.02 minutes, then second in the semi-final with 1:57.35 minutes. In the final she won the silver medal behind Soviet Tatyana Kazankina (gold) but ahead of East German Elfi Zinn (bronze). Kazankina set a new world record of 1:54.94 minutes, while Shtereva clocked in 1:55.42 minutes. The previous world record was 1:56.0 minutes, achieved by Valentina Gerasimova in June the same year. In the 1976 Olympic 1500 metres event Shtereva reached the final as well, after a fourth place in the heat and a second place in the semi-final. In the final round she finished fourth with 4:06.57 minutes, despite having clocked in 4:02.33 minutes in the semi-final. Kazankina won the gold again; Shtereva was 0.48 seconds too late for the bronze medal.

In the 1980 Olympic 800 metres event she achieved similar results in all the three rounds. She first ran in 1:58.83 minutes to finish third in round one, and in 1:58.87 minutes to finish fourth in the semi-final. In the final she ran in 1:58.71 to finish seventh. In the 1980 Olympic 1500 metres event she ran in 4:08.25 minutes in the first round, better than in the equivalent round of the 1976 Olympics, but this time it was not enough to progress from the heats. She later finished seventh in the final at the 1982 European Championships.

== Domestic titles ==
Shtereva became Bulgarian champion in the 400 metres in 1974, 800 metres champion in 1974, 1976, 1979, 1981, 1982, 1985, 1986, 1988 and 1989, 1500 metres champion 1980, 1985 and 1986 and 10,000 metres champion in 1986. In the 800 metres she established a long-standing championship record with her 1:57.2 minutes, achieved in 1979. After Shtereva's last national championship victory in the 800 metres, the hegemony was taken over by Petya Strashilova who won every year but one (1996) between 1990 and 1998. She also became Bulgarian indoor champion in the 800 metres in 1974, 1976, 1979, 1980 and 1987, in the 1500 metres in 1976 and 1987 and in the 3000 metres in 1986. She achieved championship records all three events, with 2:01.1 minutes, 4:09.80 minutes and 9:06.61 minutes respectively; the two latter times were beat in 2000 by Daniela Yordanova, with 4:08.53 minutes and 8:52.90 minutes respectively.

== Personal bests ==
The times achieved by Shtereva at the 1976 Summer Olympics, 1:55.42 in the 800 metres and 4:02.33 in the 1500 metres, remained her personal best times. She still holds the Bulgarian record in the 800 metres. She also had 2:33.8 minutes in the 1000 metres, achieved in July 1976 in Sofia, 4:30.26 minutes in the mile run, achieved in June 1988 in Bratislava, 9:00.38 minutes in the 3000 metres, achieved in August 1978 in Thessaloniki, and 15:37.49 minutes in the 5000 metres, achieved in May 1985 in Budapest.
