= 1973 European Athletics Indoor Championships – Women's 800 metres =

The women's 800 metres event at the 1973 European Athletics Indoor Championships was held on 10 and 11 March in Rotterdam.

== Medalists ==
Gold	Silver	Bronze
Stefka Yordanova; Bulgaria	Elfi Rost; East Germany	Elżbieta Skowrońska; Poland

== Results ==
=== Heats ===
Held on 10 March.

First 3 from each heat (Q) qualified directly for the final.

Rank	Heat	Name	Nationality	Time	Notes
1	1	Svetla Zlateva	Bulgaria	2:07.05	Q
2	2	Maritta Politz	East Germany	2:07.10	Q
3	1	Elżbieta Skowrońska	Poland	2:07.30	Q
4	2	Stefka Yordanova	Bulgaria	2:07.42	Q
5	2	Colette Besson	France	2:07.46	Q
6	1	Elfi Rost	East Germany	2:07.56	Q
7	2	Anneke de Lange	Netherlands	2:07.96	
8	2	Rosemary Stirling	Great Britain	2:08.14	
9	1	Joke van Gerven	Netherlands	2:09.20	
10	1	Brigitte Kraus	West Germany	2:09.90	
11	1	Zina Boniolo	Italy	2:10.55	

=== Final ===
Held on 11 March.

Rank	Name	Nationality	Time	Notes
1st place, gold medalist(s)	Stefka Yordanova	Bulgaria	2:02.65	WB
2nd place, silver medalist(s)	Elfi Rost	East Germany	2:02.83	NR
3rd place, bronze medalist(s)	Elżbieta Skowrońska	Poland	2:02.90	NR
4	Svetla Zlateva	Bulgaria	2:03.59	
5	Maritta Politz	East Germany	2:06.40	
6	Colette Besson	France	2:08.61	
