= Siege of Brieg =

Coordinates: 50°52′N 17°29′E

- Part of War of the Austrian Succession
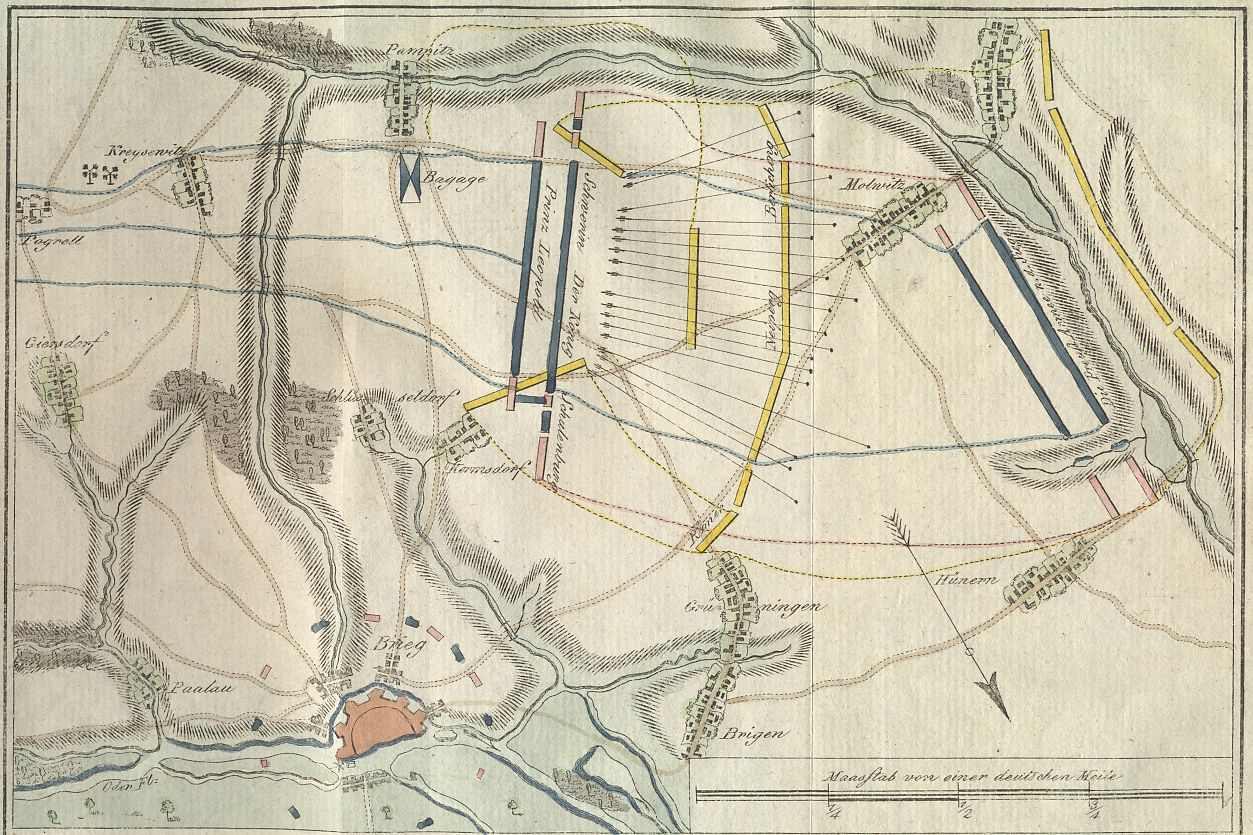
- Battle of Mollwitz map shows Brieg at the lower edge.
Date	11 April – 4 May 1741
Location	Brzeg (Brieg), Poland
Result	Prussian victory

Belligerents
Prussia	Habsburg monarchy

Commanders and leaders
(Kingdom of Prussia) King Frederick II (Kingdom of Prussia) Kurt von Schwerin	(Habsburg monarchy) Ottavio Piccolomini

Strength
6,000	2,000

The Siege of Brieg or Siege of Brzeg (11 April – 4 May 1741) resulted in the surrender of the Habsburg Austrian garrison of Brzeg (Brieg) during the War of the Austrian Succession. The Austrians were led by Ottavio Piccolomini d'Aragona and the Prussian besiegers were commanded by King Frederick II. Starting in December 1740, the Prussian army under Frederick II invaded and overran the Habsburg territory of Silesia. Frederick hoped that Austria would accept a diplomatic solution for the loss of its province, but Queen Maria Theresa refused. When the Prussians defeated the Austrian relief army at the Battle of Mollwitz on 10 April 1741, the garrison of Brzeg (Brieg) was doomed. After a few weeks, the Austrian garrison surrendered and was allowed free passage to the fortress of Nysa (Neisse).

== Background ==
The spark that started the War of the Austrian Succession was the death of Charles VI, Holy Roman Emperor on 20 October 1740, leaving his daughter Maria Theresa as his heir. Charles VI and his diplomats had worked hard to get the other European powers to agree to the Pragmatic Sanction, in which the Habsburg dominions would pass intact to Maria Theresa. However, the Habsburg monarchy had struggled in the 1720s and 1730s and was viewed by the other powers as weak and vulnerable. Maria Theresa later recalled, "I found myself without money, without credit, without army, without experience and knowledge of my own and finally, also without any counsel." Her only wish was to ensure that her husband Francis Stephen, Duke of Lorraine would succeed her father as Holy Roman Emperor.

Queen Elizabeth Farnese of Spain planned to seize Habsburg lands in Italy to form a principality for her son Don Philip. The ruler of the Electorate of Bavaria, Charles Albert was intriguing to be elected Holy Roman Emperor. King Frederick II decided to acquire the Habsburg province of Silesia for the Kingdom of Prussia. Frederick II hoped to ignite a larger war in which Austria would be so busy fending off its enemies that it might be unable to oppose Prussia. Frederick's only worry was opposition from the Russian Empire but the recent death of Empress Anna meant that Russia was preoccupied with internal affairs.

== Invasion ==
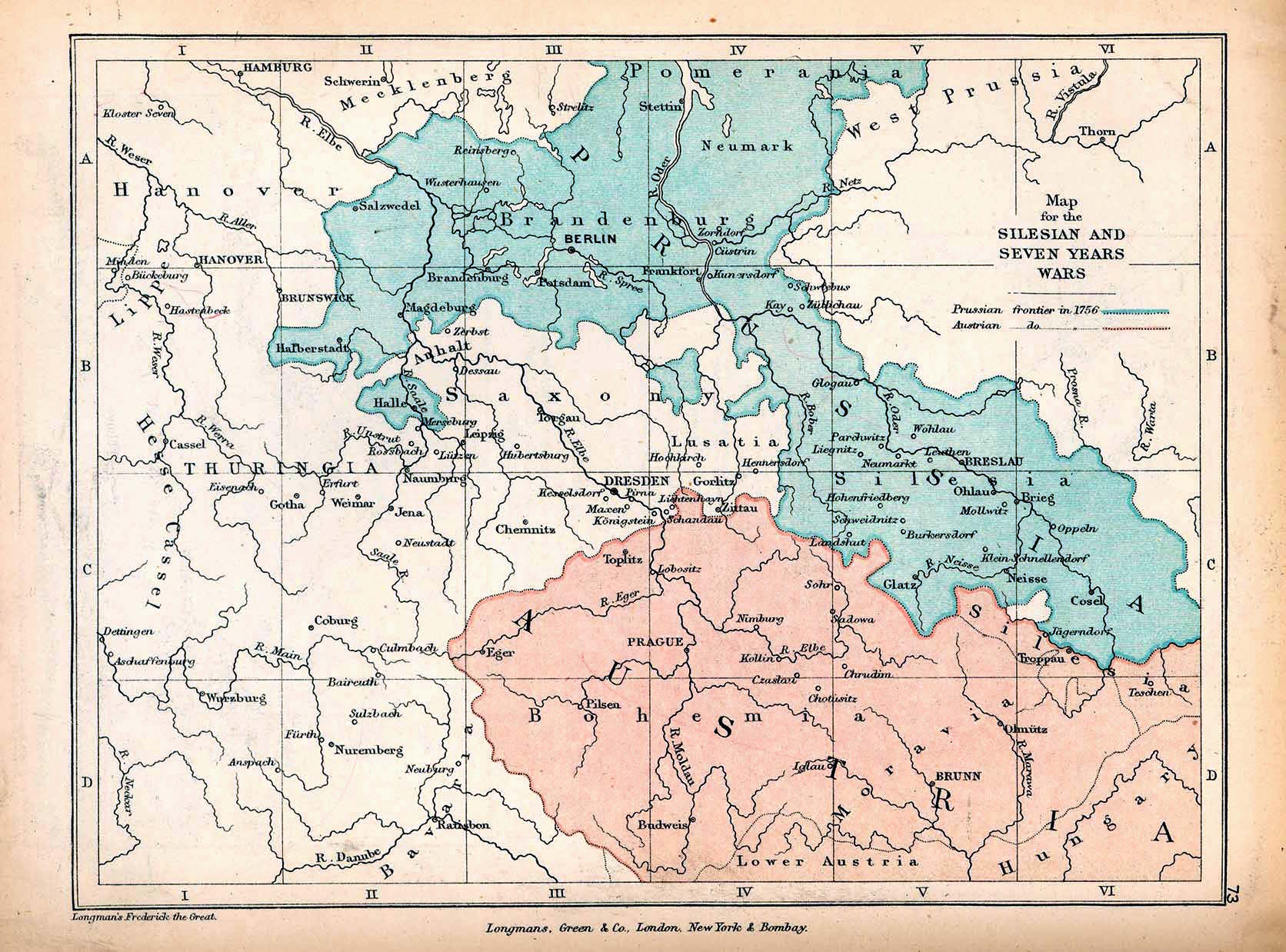
Brieg (Brzeg), Glogau (Głogów), Breslau (Wrocław), Neisse (Nysa), and Glatz (Kłodzko) are shown in Silesia on the right side of the map.

The Austrian representative in Berlin, Antoniotto Botta Adorno warned Maria Theresa that Frederick II was about to invade Silesia. This territory was described as the "true jewel of the house of Austria." Silesia's woolen-cloth industry and its position athwart European trade routes accounted for 25% of the tax revenue collected from the Habsburg crown lands. Yet, the defenses of Głogów (Glogau), Brzeg, and Kłodzko (Glatz) were in poor repair and only the fortress of Nysa (Neisse) was in good condition. Further, there were only 7,500 Austrian soldiers under Feldmarschall-Leutnant (FML) Maximilian Ulysses Browne available to defend the province. These were the Infantry Regiment Wallis (1,719 men), Infantry Regiments Botta, Browne, and Harrach (4,770), Cavalry Regiment Liechtenstein (570), Frei-Corps (300), and the garrisons of Głogów (1,178) and Jablunkov (Jablunkau) (120).

On 16 December 1740, Frederick II led 27,000 Prussian soldiers across the frontier into Silesia. Field Marshal Kurt Christoph Graf von Schwerin, a veteran of the War of the Spanish Succession, led one column south to the Sudeten Mountains and then southeast along the foothills. It encountered only slight opposition before reaching Opava. Schwerin's purpose was to block any Austrian reinforcements coming from Moravia. Meanwhile, Frederick II led another column along the Oder River. The Prussian king and his forces entered Wrocław (Breslau) on 3 January 1741. Browne with 3,000 soldiers retreated into Moravia. Meanwhile, the Prussians blockaded Głogów, Brzeg, and Nysa. On 12 January 1741, the Prussians captured 346 Austrians who were defending a castle at Otmuchów (Ottmachau). Frederick met determined opposition only at Nysa before announcing, "Silesia is as good as conquered" on 14 January. On 9 March, Field Marshal Leopold I, Prince of Anhalt-Dessau stormed Głogów at a cost of only 50 killed and wounded. The Prussians inflicted 60 casualties and captured FML Franz Wenzel von Wallis, 900 Austrians, 69 cannons, 5 mortars, and 8 standards.

The Prussians laid a heavy hand on Silesia, extorting funds and conscripting local men into the army. In Upper Silesia, the largely Roman Catholic population remained hostile. Schwerin remarked to Frederick that, "all the people between the Eastern Nysa (Nysa Kłodzka) and the Oder are sworn enemies of your majesty." In Lower Silesia, the majority Protestants initially welcomed the Protestant Prussians, but they soon began to resent the invaders. Browne sent detachments to harass Prussian outposts. Frederick was nearly captured by Austrian hussars at Krnov (Jägerndorf) in Upper Silesia. The Prussian king sent his diplomats to get the Habsburgs to surrender Silesia in return for help in turning away Austria's other enemies. Maria Theresa stubbornly refused to concede any of her territory.

== Battle and siege ==
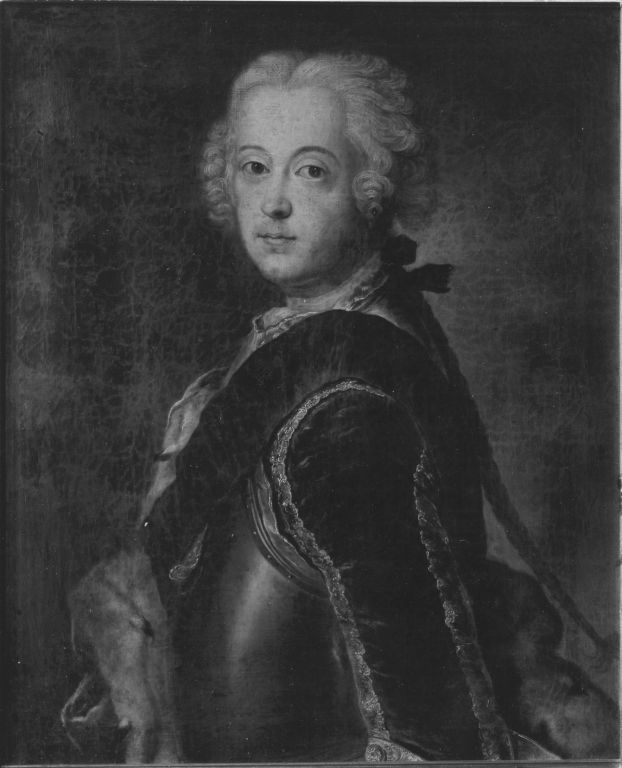
King Frederick II, 1741

Both Field Marshals Wilhelm Reinhard von Neipperg and Ludwig Andreas von Khevenhüller were considered for command of the army designed to recapture Silesia. Neipperg had been imprisoned by Emperor Charles VI for bungling the Treaty of Belgrade negotiations at the end of the Austro-Turkish War of 1737–1739. Nevertheless, Neipperg was selected because he promised success with fewer troops and smaller funds. Neipperg was experienced, confident, and anxious to wipe away the stain of his recent disgrace. The Austrians believed that their army was superior to that of the upstart Prussians. For his part, Frederick II reinforced his Silesian occupation army by 30,000 soldiers.

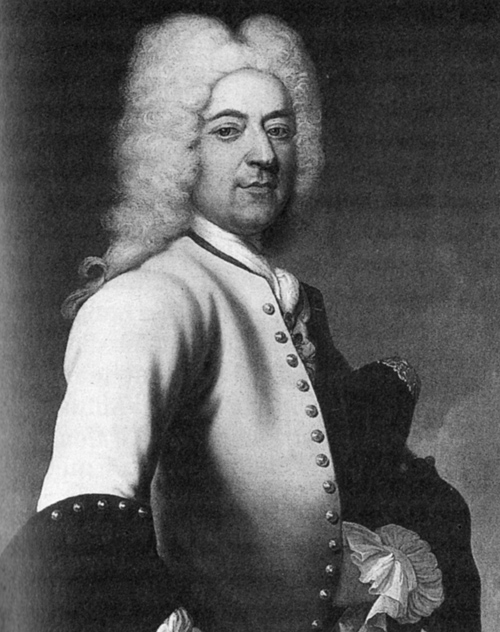
Wilhelm von Neipperg

Frederick II was aware that Neipperg was gathering an army in Moravia, but the Prussian king did not know where it would enter Silesia. Therefore, Frederick split his army, sending Schwerin to lead the other half. On 29 March 1745, Neipperg led 15,000 Austrian troops across the frontier near the confluence of the Oder and Ostravice Rivers. (Note: The Oder and the Ostravice merge near the modern city of Ostrava in the Czech Republic.) The Prussians were taken by surprise since they expected Neipperg to wait until spring. The covering forces led by Frederick and Schwerin were 25 mi (40 km) apart and the Austrian general took advantage of their separation to reach Nysa on 5 April.

Neipperg left Nysa and moved farther north to Grodków (Grotkau). The Austrian sent Generalfeldwachtmeister (GFWM) Cäsar Joseph von Lentulus to cover the bridge over the Eastern Nysa at Sorge. By 9 April, the Austrians were camped at Małujowice (Mollwitz) and other villages near Brzeg. Moving north of the Eastern Nysa was a blunder because it took the Austrian army out of Catholic-majority Silesia, where it enjoyed good intelligence of Prussian movements. Therefore, Neipperg remained unaware of the location of the Prussian army. First Frederick II joined his and Schwerin's forces together. Since Neipperg had marched north past the Prussian covering forces, Frederick's army approached the Austrians from the south.

The 1928 map of Brieg shows green park land (Promenade) that follows the trace of the old fortress defenses.

On 10 April 1741, Frederick II attacked Neipperg's Austrians in the Battle of Mollwitz. The Austrian cavalry routed the Prussian horsemen but then turned aside to plunder the opposing camp. The Prussian infantry advanced, firing rapid volleys with precision while the more numerous Prussian artillery pieces pounded the Austrian infantry. Unable to face the onslaught, Neipperg ordered a retreat. Statistician Gaston Bodart stated that 21,600 Prussians and 53 cannons sustained 4,600 casualties, including 2 generals killed, while 15,800 Austrians and 19 cannons suffered losses of 4,500 men, 7 cannons, 17 colors, and 2 generals killed.

Brzeg was garrisoned by 2,000 Austrians commanded by GFWM Ottavio Enea Joseph Piccolomini, Fürst d'Aragona (1698–1757), who would attain the rank of Feldzeugmeister in 1748. A force of 6,000 Prussians in 9 battalions and 6 squadrons began the siege on 11 April 1741. Piccolomini capitulated on 4 May after a courageous defense. The 1,800 surviving Austrian defenders were allowed the honors of war and free passage to the fortress of Nysa. Frederick II led the Prussian siege force.

== Aftermath ==
The Prussian king spent the summer months trying to improve his cavalry and correcting other faults of his army. After Mollwitz, Frederick offered to pay Austria 3 million thalers for Lower Silesia, but this was rejected. On 9 October 1741, Frederick came to an agreement with the Austrians called the Convention of Kleinschnellendorf which temporarily ended the fighting. In February 1742, after expanding his army to 117,600 men, Frederick re-entered the war against Austria and invaded Moravia.

== Notes ==
Footnotes

Citations
