= Athletics at the 1976 Summer Olympics – Women's 800 metres =

Women's 800 metres at the Games of the XXI Olympiad
- Venue: Olympic Stadium
- Date: 23–26 July 1976
- Competitors: 35 from 20 nations
- Winning time: 1:54.94 WR

Medalists
1st place, gold medalist(s)		Tatyana Kazankina; Soviet Union
2nd place, silver medalist(s)		Nikolina Shtereva; Bulgaria
3rd place, bronze medalist(s)		Elfi Zinn; East Germany

The women's 800 metres competition at the 1976 Summer Olympics in Montreal, Quebec, Canada was held at the Olympic Stadium from 23 to 26 July.

== Competition format ==
The competition consisted of heats (Round 1), Semifinals and a Final. The three fastest competitors from each race in the heats plus the next fastest overall qualified for the Semifinals. The four fastest competitors from each of the Semifinal races advanced to the Final.

== Records ==
Prior to the competition, the existing World and Olympic records were as follows.

World record	Valentina Gerasimova (URS)	1:56.0	Kiev, USSR	12 June 1976
Olympic record	Hildegard Falck (FRG)	1:58.55	Munich, West Germany	3 September 1972

The top four finishers in the final all went under the existing world record.

== Results ==
=== Round 1 ===
Qual. rule: first 3 of each heat (Q) plus the next fastest time (q) qualified.

==== Heat 1 ====
Rank	Athlete	Nation	Time	Notes
1	Svetlana Styrkina	Soviet Union	2:00.12	Q
2	Judy Amoore	Australia	2:00.66	Q
3	Doris Gluth	East Germany	2:00.70	Q
4	Rita Thijs	Belgium	2:04.39	
5	Abby Hoffman	Canada	2:05.32	
6	Carmen Valero	Spain	2:06.14	
7	Lilja Guðmundsdóttir	Iceland	2:07.26	

==== Heat 2 ====
Rank	Athlete	Nation	Time	Notes
1	Anita Weiß	East Germany	2:00.48	Q
2	Nikolina Shtereva	Bulgaria	2:01.02	Q
3	Gabriella Dorio	Italy	2:01.63	Q
4	Jozefína Čerchlanová	Czechoslovakia	2:02.36	
5	Kathy Weston	United States	2:03.31	
6	Joan Wenzel	Canada	2:03.62	
—N/a	Chee Swee Lee	Singapore	DNF	

==== Heat 3 ====
Rank	Athlete	Nation	Time	Notes
1	Svetla Zlateva	Bulgaria	1:59.24	Q
2	Valentina Gerasimova	Soviet Union	1:59.68	Q
3	Wendy Koenig	United States	1:59.91	Q
4	Mariana Suman	Romania	2:00.00	q
5	Liz Barnes	Great Britain	2:01.70	
6	Célestine N'Drin	Ivory Coast	2:04.54	
7	Maria Ritter	Liechtenstein	2:14.39	

==== Heat 4 ====
Rank	Athlete	Nation	Time	Notes
1	Elfi Zinn	East Germany	2:01.54	Q
2	Charlene Rendina	Australia	2:01.76	Q
3	Ileana Silai	Romania	2:02.82	Q
4	Angela Creamer	Great Britain	2:03.48	
5	Magdolna Lázár	Hungary	2:04.05	
6	Ileana Hocking	Puerto Rico	2:08.46	
7	Ndew Niang	Senegal	2:09.32	
—N/a	Nina Holmén	Finland	DNS	

==== Heat 5 ====
Rank	Athlete	Nation	Time	Notes
1	Tatyana Kazankina	Soviet Union	2:00.15	Q
2	Lilyana Tomova	Bulgaria	2:00.54	Q
3	Madeline Manning	United States	2:00.62	Q
4	Yvonne Saunders	Canada	2:03.54	
5	Anne-Marie Van Nuffel	Belgium	2:04.09	
6	Chris McMeekin	Great Britain	2:04.54	
7	Anne Audain	New Zealand	2:05.78	

=== Semifinals ===
==== Heat 1 ====
Rank	Athlete	Nation	Time	Notes
1	Anita Weiß	East Germany	1:56.53	Q OR
2	Tatyana Kazankina	Soviet Union	1:57.49	Q
3	Svetla Zlateva	Bulgaria	1:57.93	Q
4	Doris Gluth	East Germany	1:59.32	Q
5	Judy Amoore	Australia	1:59.93	
6	Ileana Silai	Romania	2:02.22	
7	Wendy Koenig	United States	2:02.31	
8	Gabriella Dorio	Italy	2:02.46	

==== Heat 2 ====
Rank	Athlete	Nation	Time	Notes
1	Svetlana Styrkina	Soviet Union	1:57.28	Q
2	Nikolina Shtereva	Bulgaria	1:57.35	Q
3	Elfi Zinn	East Germany	1:57.56	Q
4	Mariana Suman	Romania	2:00.01	Q
5	Charlene Rendina	Australia	2:00.29	
6	Valentina Gerasimova	Soviet Union	2:01.00	
7	Lilyana Tomova	Bulgaria	2:01.97	
8	Madeline Manning	United States	2:07.25	

=== Final ===
Rank	Athlete	Nation	Time	Notes
1st place, gold medalist(s)	Tatyana Kazankina	Soviet Union	1:54.94	WR
2nd place, silver medalist(s)	Nikolina Shtereva	Bulgaria	1:55.42	
3rd place, bronze medalist(s)	Elfi Zinn	East Germany	1:55.60	
4	Anita Weiß	East Germany	1:55.74	
5	Svetlana Styrkina	Soviet Union	1:56.44	
6	Svetla Zlateva	Bulgaria	1:57.21	
7	Doris Gluth	East Germany	1:58.99	
8	Mariana Suman	Romania	2:02.21	
