= Löwitz =

- Ortsteil of Ducherow
- Interactive map of Löwitz
- Location within Germany Location within Mecklenburg-Vorpommern
- Coordinates: 53°43′N 13°44′E
- Country: Germany
- State: Mecklenburg-Vorpommern
- District: Vorpommern-Greifswald
- Town: Ducherow
- Subdivisions: 4

Area
  - Total: 30.67 km^{2} (11.84 sq mi)
- Elevation: 7 m (23 ft)

Population (2006-12-31)
  - Total: 449
  - Density: 14.6/km^{2} (37.9/sq mi)
- Time zone: UTC+01:00 (CET)
  - Summer (DST): UTC+02:00 (CEST)
- Postal codes: 17398
- Dialling codes: 039726
- Vehicle registration: OVP
- Website: www.amt-anklam-land.de

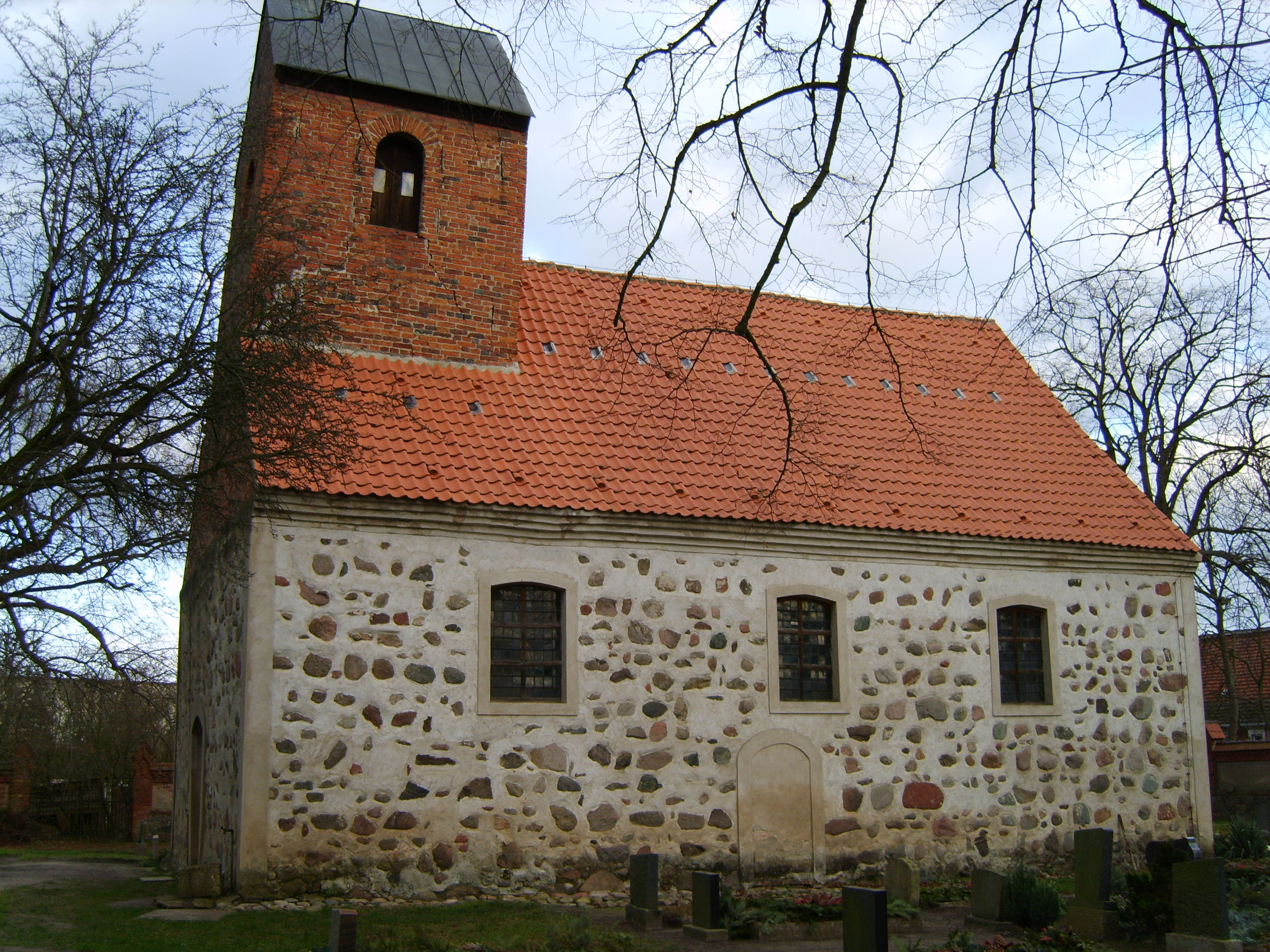
A church in Löwitz

Löwitz is a village and a former municipality in the Vorpommern-Greifswald district, in Mecklenburg-Vorpommern, Germany. Since 7 June 2009, it is part of the municipality Ducherow.

== History ==
From 1648 to 1720, Löwitz was part of Swedish Pomerania. From 1720 to 1945, it was part of the Prussian Province of Pomerania, from 1945 to 1952 of the State of Mecklenburg-Vorpommern, from 1952 to 1990 of the Bezirk Neubrandenburg of East Germany and since 1990 again of Mecklenburg-Vorpommern.

Since 7 June 2009, Löwitz has been a part of the municipality Ducherow.

== Notable residents ==
- Kurt Christoph Graf von Schwerin (1684–1757), Prussian Fieldmarshal
- Hans Graf von Schwerin-Löwitz (1847-1918), politician and officer
