= August Heinrich Ferdinand Tegetmeyer =

German illustrator and engraver

- Born: March 14, 1844; Leipzig, Germany
- Died: May 31, 1912 (aged 68)
- Occupations: Illustrator; engraver

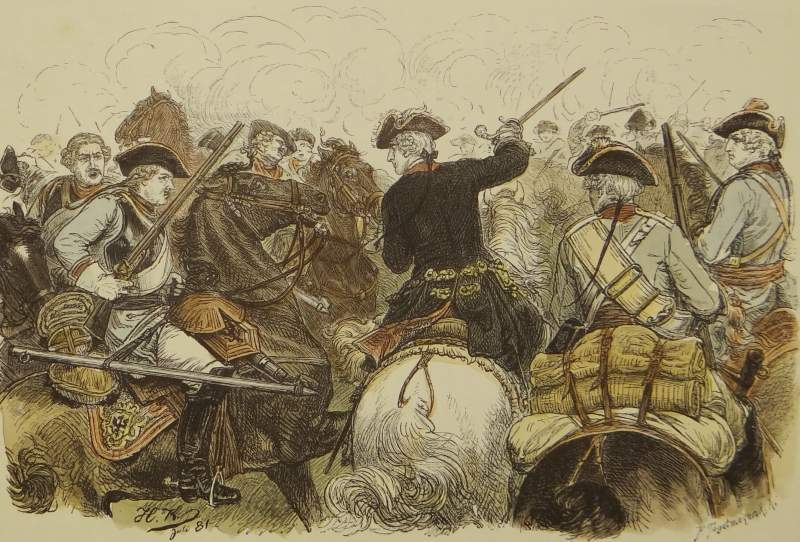
"Battle of Mollwitz" (1880)

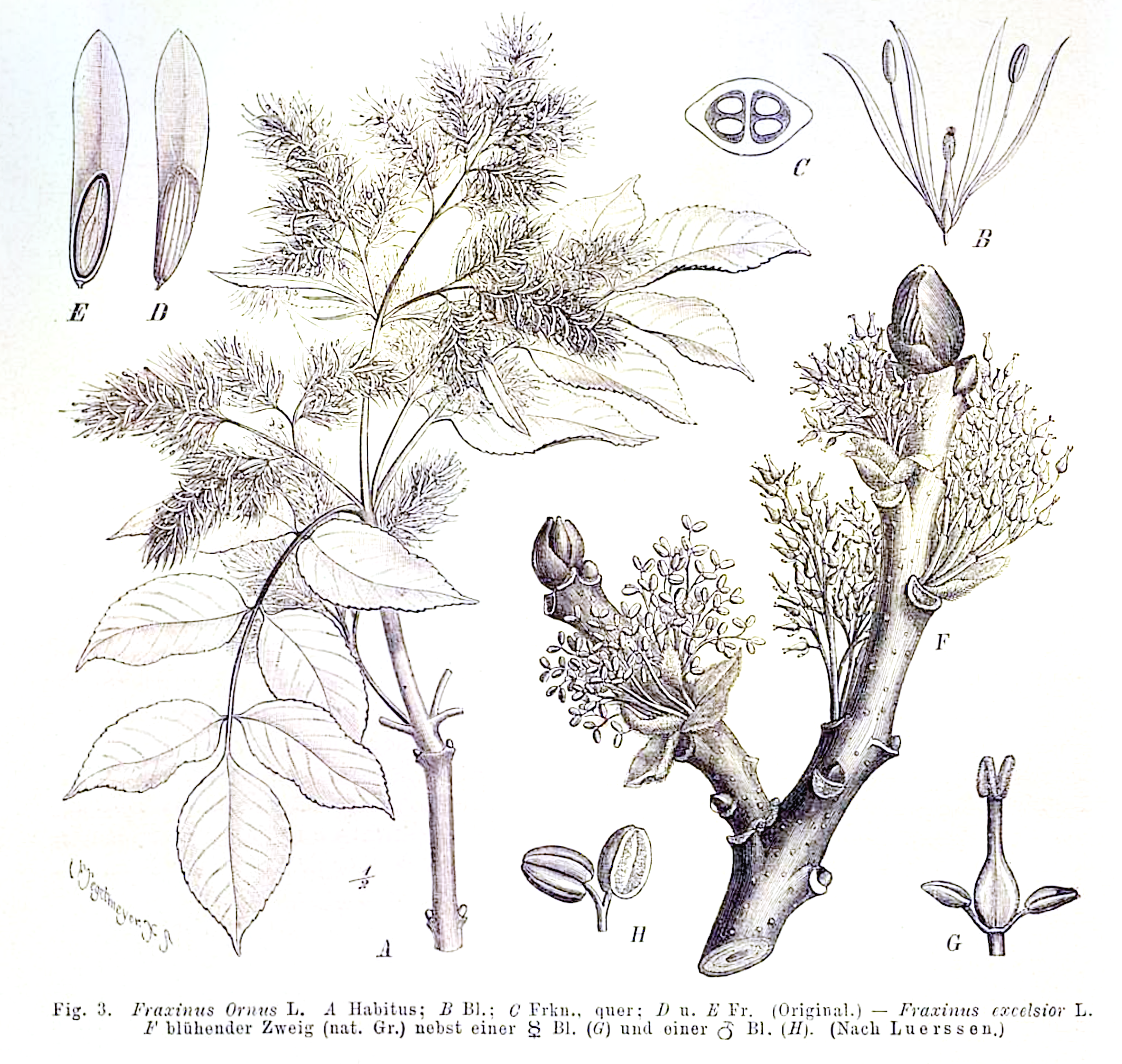
Plate from Engler & Prantl's Die natürlichen Pflanzenfamilien

August Heinrich Ferdinand Tegetmeyer (14 March 1844 Leipzig – 31 May 1912) was a German illustrator and engraver who provided the images for a large number of publications.
