= Svetlana Styrkina =

Medal record

Women's athletics

Representing the Soviet Union

European Indoor Championships
| Bronze medal – third place | 1970 Vienna | Medley relay |

IAAF World Cup
| Bronze medal – third place | 1977 Dusseldorf | 800 m |

Svetlana Styrkina (Russian: Светлана Павловна Стыркина-Мощенок; Светлана Павловна Плескач-Стыркина; née Moshchenok; born 1 January 1949) is a Belarusian former middle-distance runner for the Soviet Union. She represented her country at the 1976 Summer Olympics and was a three-time Soviet national champion.

Born in Mogilev, Styrkina rose to be one of the world's top 800 metres runners in the late 1970s. She achieved her lifetime best of 1:56.44 minutes in the women's 800 metres final at the 1976 Montreal Olympics, but this was only enough for fifth place as it was the fastest race ever at that point, with the winner Tatyana Kazankina breaking the world record. Styrkina's time still ranks her among the world's top 50 for the event, as of 2017. She also helped set a world record in 1976, running a time of 3:29.06 minutes in a mile relay race alongside Inta Kļimoviča, Natalya Sokolova and Nadezhda Ilyina.

Styrkina remained prominent on the international circuit the following year, with a fourth-place finish at the 1977 European Athletics Indoor Championships and top three finishes at the 1977 IAAF World Cup and the 1977 European Cup. Her season's best time of 1:58.73 minutes ranked her sixth in the world. She competed at a high level in the remainder of the late 1970s, recording 1:57.9 minutes in 1978 and 1:58.0 minutes in 1979, before dropping off the international scene.

After retiring from competition she went into coaching, with double Olympic champion Svetlana Masterkova among her charges.

== International competitions ==
| Year | Competition | Venue | Position | Event | Notes |
|---|---|---|---|---|---|
| 1976 | Olympic Games | Montreal, Canada | 5th | 800 m | 1:56.44 |
| 1977 | European Indoor Championships | San Sebastián, Spain | 4th | 800 m | 1:56.44 |
| 1977 | European Cup | Helsinki, Finland | 3rd | 800 m | 2:00.96 |
| 1977 | IAAF World Cup | Düsseldorf, West Germany | 3rd | 800 m | 1:59.72 |

== National titles ==
- Soviet Athletics Championships
  - 800 m: 1977
- Soviet Indoor Athletics Championships
  - 800 m: 1977, 1979
