= Ducherow =

- Municipality
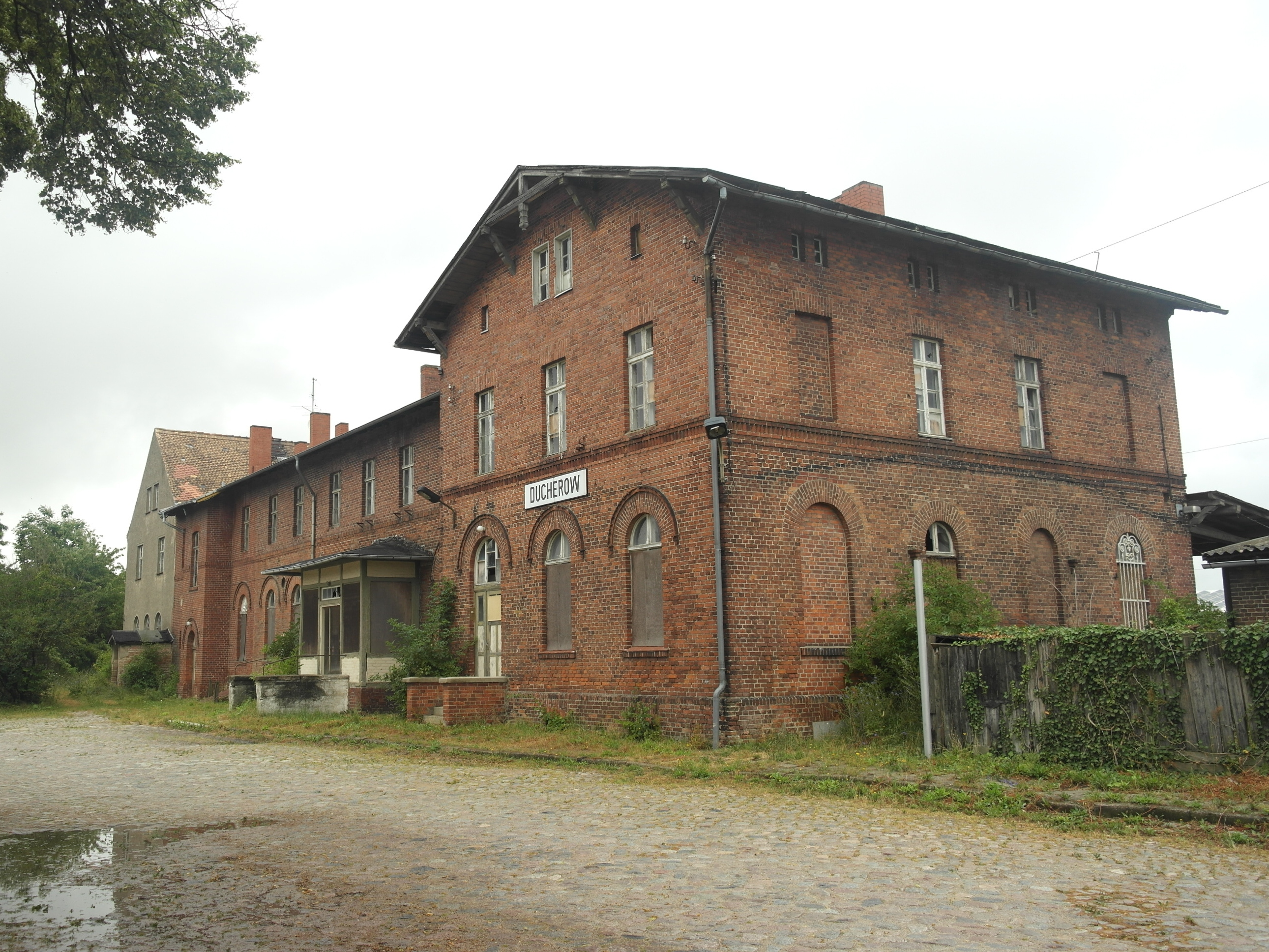
- Ducherow railway station

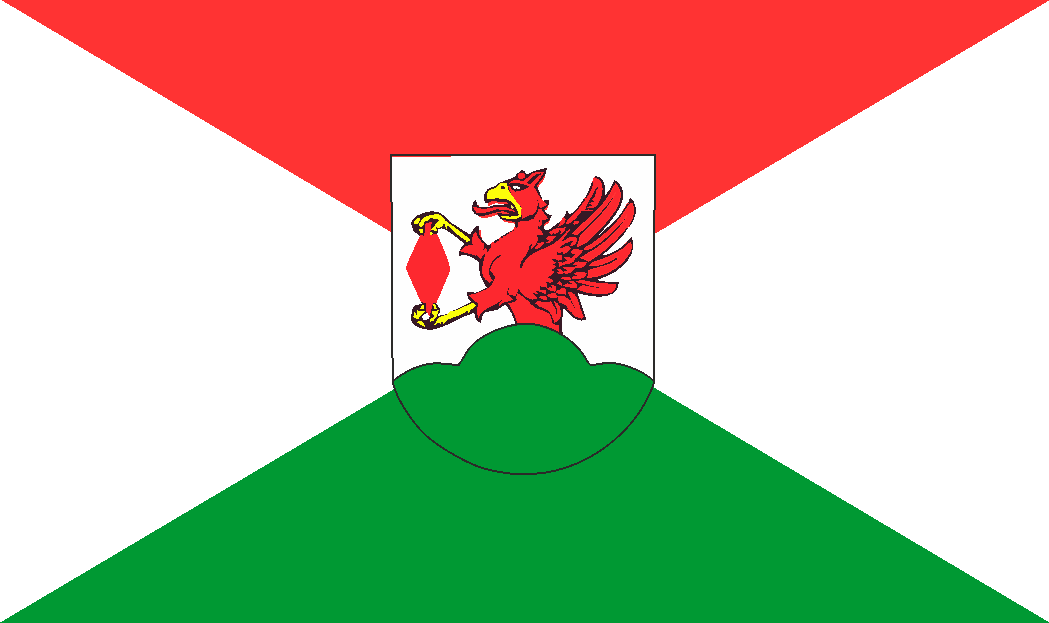
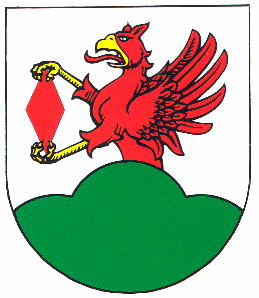
- Flag Coat of arms

- Location of Ducherow within Vorpommern-Greifswald district
- Interactive map of Ducherow
- Location within Germany Location within Mecklenburg-Vorpommern
- Coordinates: 53°46′N 13°47′E
- Country: Germany
- State: Mecklenburg-Vorpommern
- District: Vorpommern-Greifswald
- Municipal assoc.: Anklam-Land

Government
  - Mayor: Martin Weitmann (Ind.)

Area
  - Total: 77.53 km^{2} (29.93 sq mi)
- Elevation: 4 m (13 ft)

Population (2025-12-31)
  - Total: 2,190
  - Density: 28.2/km^{2} (73.2/sq mi)
- Time zone: UTC+01:00 (CET)
  - Summer (DST): UTC+02:00 (CEST)
- Postal codes: 17398
- Dialling codes: 039726
- Vehicle registration: VG
- Website: www.amt-anklam-land.de

Ducherow (German pronunciation: [ˈduːxəʁoː]) is a municipality in the Vorpommern-Greifswald district, in Mecklenburg-Vorpommern, Germany. The municipality consists of 10 officially recognized villages (Ortsteile), three of which used to constitute separate municipalities until 2009 and 2012 respectively. The municipality is a member of the Amt Anklam-Land and its municipal core as well as the main settlement is Ducherow which has a railway station that is designated as a cultural heritage monument.

== Geography ==
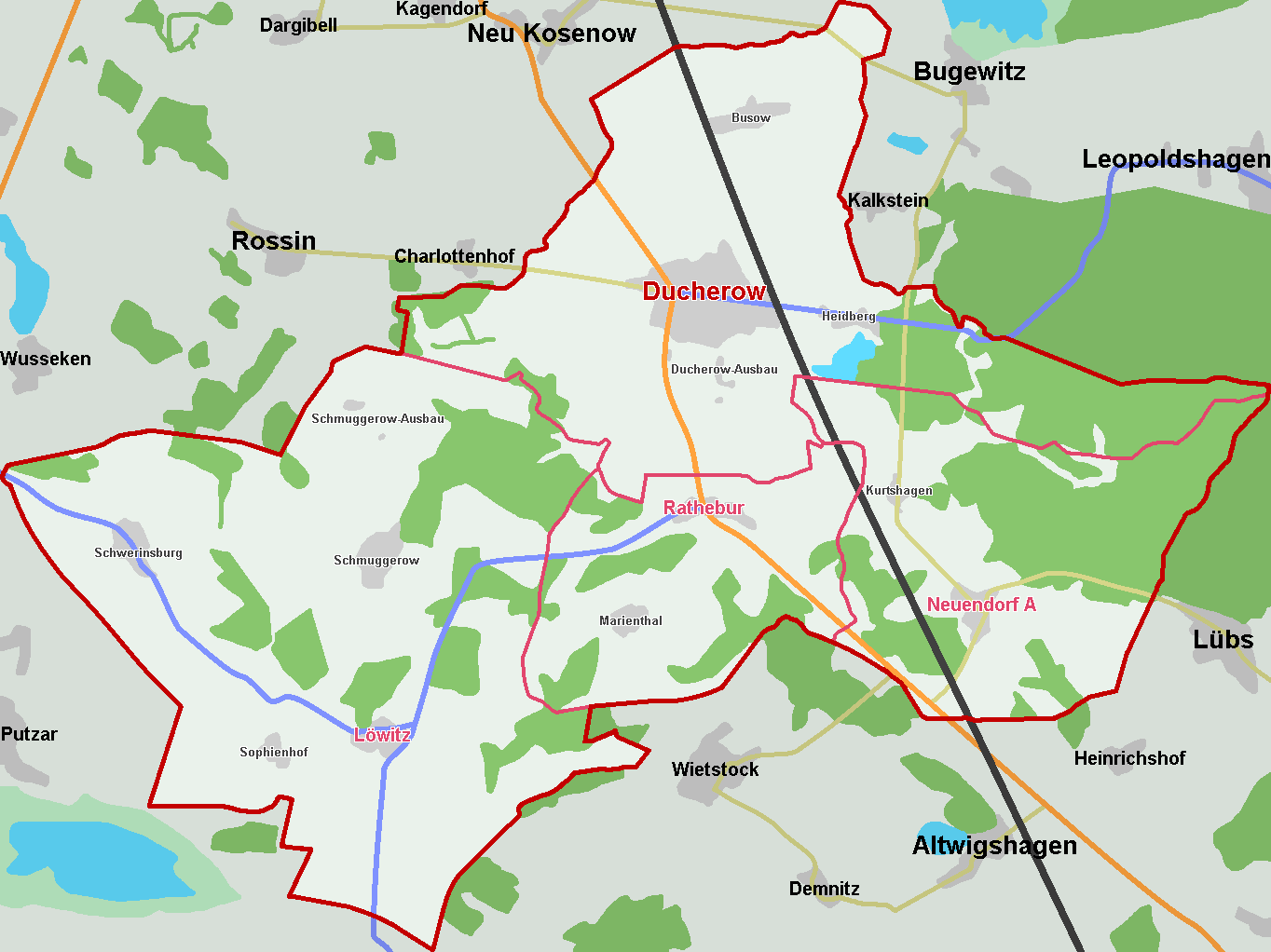
Map of Duckerow, subdivided into its former municipalities, showing all its constituent villages and settlements

The Ducherow lies to the west of the Ueckermünde Heath within the historical region of Pomerania. The main settlement lies around 11 kilometres (6.8 mi) south-east of Anklam and 16 kilometres (9.9 mi) west of Ueckermünde, as well as 8 kilometres (5.0 mi) south-west of the Szczecin Lagoon.

Ducherow as a municipality consists of Ducherow itself and three other former municipalities that were annexed into Ducherow. These are: Neuendorf A, Löwitz, and Rathebur. These former municipalities and Ducherow are officially subdivided into villages (Ortsteile), officially recognized are the following: Ducherow, Busow, Kurtshagen, Löwitz, Marienthal, Neuendorf A, Rathebur, Sophienhof, Schmuggerow und Schwerinsburg. The municipality further includes the two non-recognized settlements Schmuggerow-Ausbau and Ducherow-Ausbau.

=== Transport ===
Ducherow is connected by road via the Bundesstraße 109, which bisects the municipality from south-east to north-west, and runs though the main settlement. Ducherow lies on the Angermünde–Stralsund railway to which the municipality is connected through the Ducherow railway station. This station is serviced by the RE3 and RE10 regional express trains which connect the municipality to cities like Berlin, Angermünde, Eberswalde and Stralsund.

== History ==
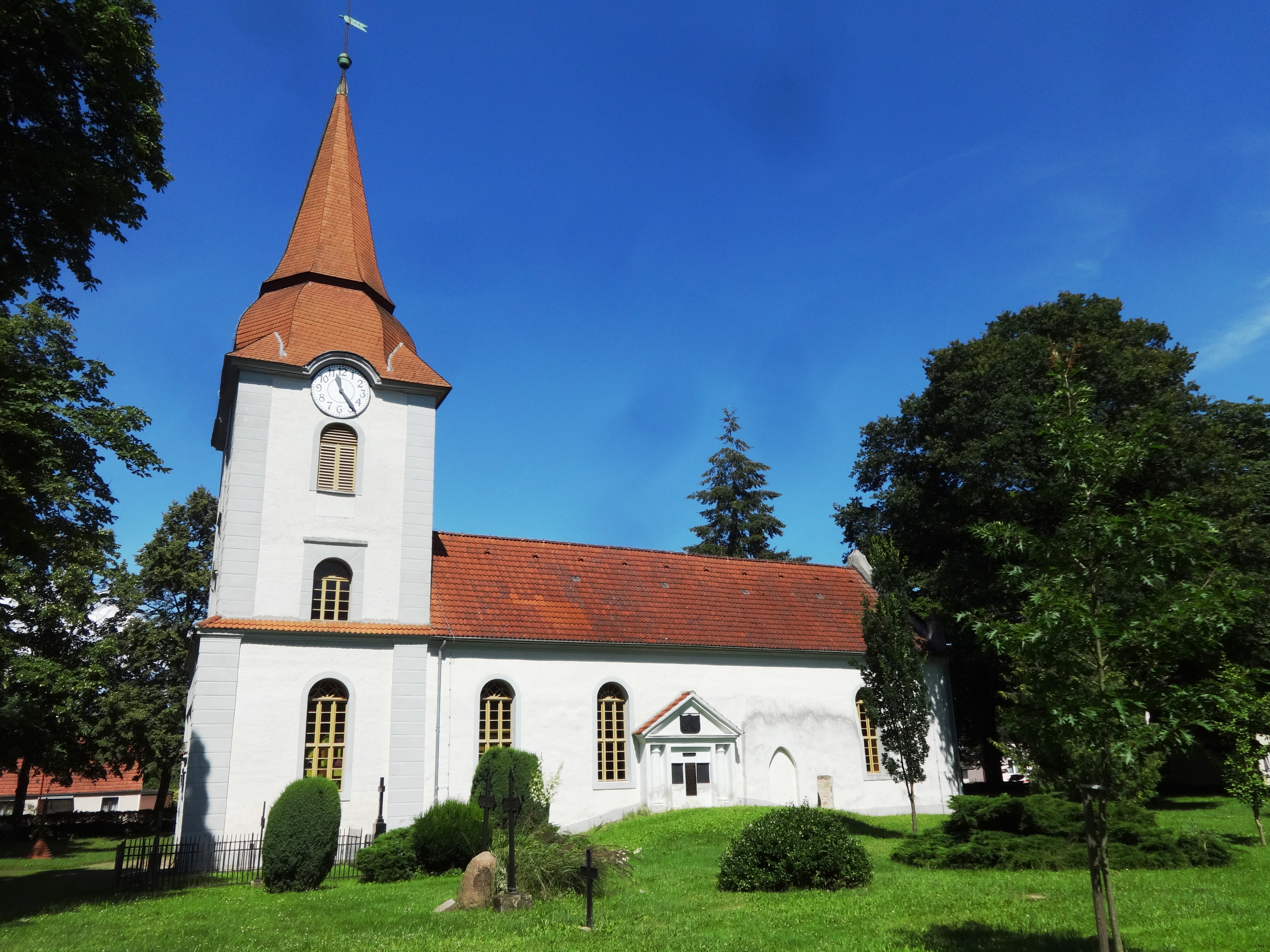
Ducherow church

From 1648 to 1720, Ducherow was part of Swedish Pomerania. From 1720 to 1945, it was part of the Prussian Province of Pomerania, from 1945 to 1952 of the State of Mecklenburg-Vorpommern, from 1952 to 1990 of the Bezirk Neubrandenburg of East Germany and since 1990 again of Mecklenburg-Vorpommern.

The municipalities of Löwitz and Rathebur were annexed into Ducherow on 1 June 2009. Another municipality, Neuendorf A, was annexed into Ducherow on 1 January 2012.

== Politics ==
=== Municipal council ===
Officially, the municipal council of Ducherow has 12 seats, in the last election however, independent Martin Weitmann won three seats, leaving two seats vacant, de facto shrinking the actual size of the council to 10 seats. The most recent elections were the 2024 Mecklenburg-Vorpommern local elections, held on 9 June 2024, with the following result:

Party	Votes	Share		Seats		
Party	Votes	%	+/-	Awarded	Filled	+/–
Wählergruppe Bündnis Ducherow	1,171	34.21	New	4	4	▲4
Christian Democratic Union of Germany	1,037	30.20	▼12.30	3	3	▼2
Ind. Martin Weitmann	755	22.06	▲13.66	3	1	▲2 (Note: Awarded: ▲2, Filled: 1)
Vorwärts Ducherow	261	7.62	New	1	1	▲1
Ind. Ramona Behm	199	5.81	▲0.19	1	1	▲1
Total	3,423	100.0		12	10	▼2
Valid votes	3,423	92.99				
Invalid/blank votes	250	6.79				
Total votes	3,673	100.0				
Turnout	1,227	60.74	▼12.47			
Eligible voters	2,020					

=== Mayor ===
The current mayor of Ducherow is Martin Weitmann, an independent, who was elected with 71.32% (848 votes) during the 2024 Mecklenburg-Vorpommern local elections. His only opponent was Robert Hoffmann of the CDU, who received 26.68% (341 votes).

List of mayors (incomplete):

- 1994–2007: Bernd Schubert (CDU)
- 2007–2014: Karsten Naumann (Ind.)
- 2014–2024: Bernd Schubert (CDU)
- since 2024: Martin Weitmann (Ind.)

== Notable people ==
- Kurt Christoph Graf von Schwerin (1684–1757), Prussian general, born in Löwitz
- Otto Magnus von Schwerin (1701–1777), Prussian general, lived in Busow
- Otto Heyden (1820–1897), painter, born in Ducherow
- Elfi Zinn (born 1953), middle distance runner, born in Rathebur
