= Johannes Kaempf =

German liberal politician and banker

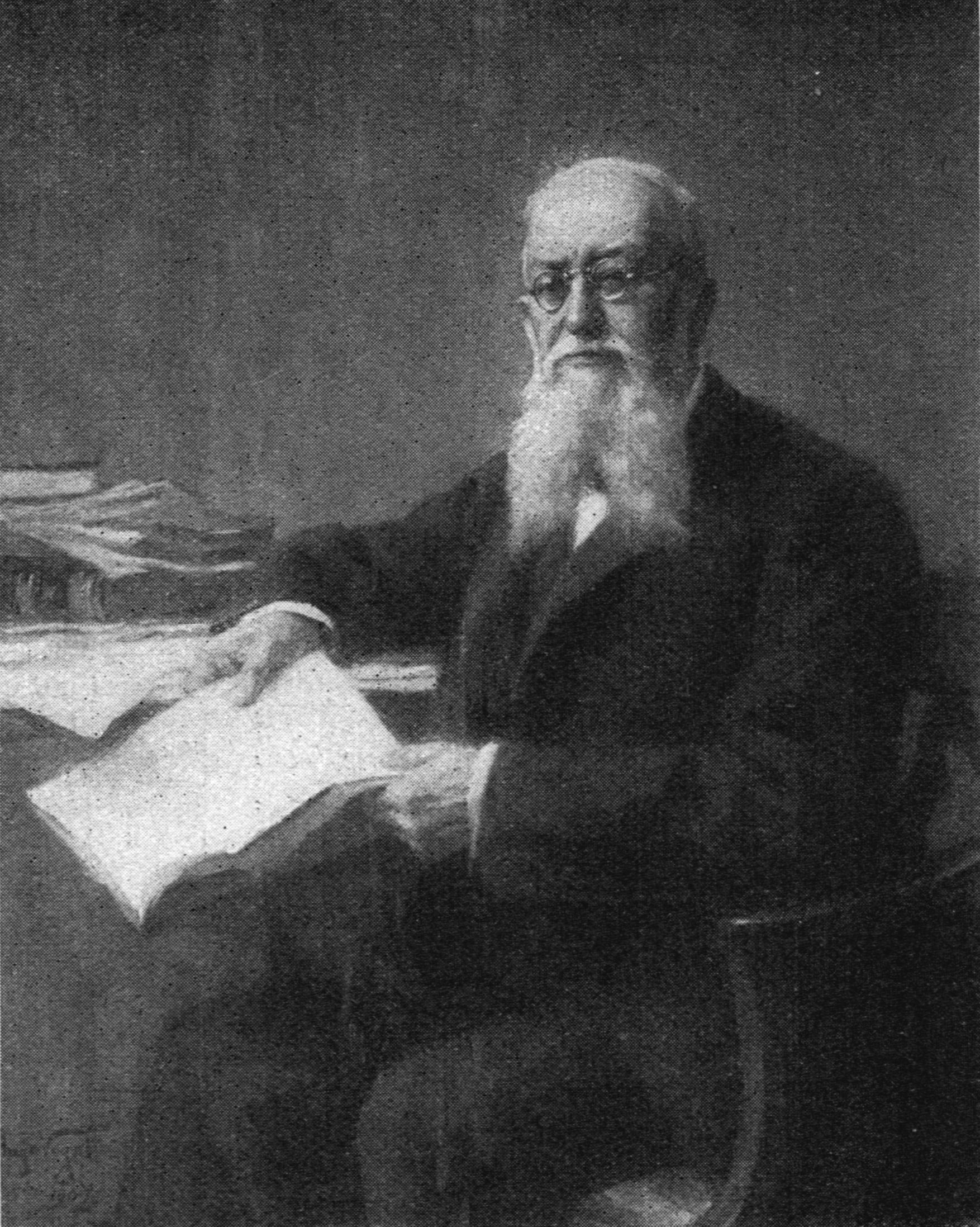
- Johannes Kaempf in 1910

President of the Reichstag
- In office 7 February 1912 – 25 May 1918
- Monarch: Wilhelm II
- Preceded by: Hans Graf von Schwerin-Löwitz
- Succeeded by: Constantin Fehrenbach

Personal details
- Born: 18 February 1842 Neuruppin, Province of Brandenburg, Kingdom of Prussia
- Died: 25 May 1918 (aged 76) Berlin, Kingdom of Prussia, German Empire
- Party: Progressive People's Party

Johannes Kaempf (18 February 1842 – 25 May 1918) was a German liberal politician and banker. From 1912 to 1918, he was president of the Reichstag.

== Life ==
Johannes Kaempf was the director of the branch of the Bank of Trade and Industry in Berlin and President of the German trading day. As President of the Economic Society, he joined in 1903 for the establishment of the Graduate School of Berlin. He was a member of the Free-minded People's Party and the Progressive People's Party and represented the left-wing liberals for the first Berlin Constituency from 1903 to 1918 in the Reichstag. From 1912 until his death, he was president of the German Reichstag.

Kaempf's death in May 1918 had an unexpected side effect on the fate of the Empire. Because of the need to occupy Kaempf's Reichstag mandate constituency anew, the Independent Social Democratic Party of Germany (USPD) could nominate the left trade unionists and revolutionary Richard Müller for the by-election; the government had to exempt these from military service. Müller was released in September 1918 from the army and came to Berlin, lost the election, but played a significant role in the organization of the insurrection of 9 November.

On 22 October 1899, Kaempf was awarded the honorary title of city elder of Berlin. In 1915, he was awarded an honorary title of Kaiser Wilhelm II. This was the decision for the inscription "To the German People" at the Reichstag building in Berlin.

Kaempf was a member of the Masonic Lodge of Saint John the Black Eagle in Landsberg on the Warta River and an honorary member of the Grand National-Muttlerloge, The Three Globes. He was buried in Stahnsdorf South-Western Cemetery.

== Literature ==
- John Kaempf: speeches and essays. Published by the elders of the merchants of Berlin. Berlin, Georg Reimer, 1912
- Wolfgang Wölk: Kaempf, Johannes. In: New German Biography (NDB). Volume 10, Duncker & Humblot, Berlin 1974, ISBN 3-428-00191-5, page 728 f. (Digitized).

== Bibliography ==
- Ralf Hoff Rogge: Richard Muller - The Man Behind the November Revolution. Berlin 2008, p. 60ff.
