= Ducherow station =

Railway station in Germany

Ducherow
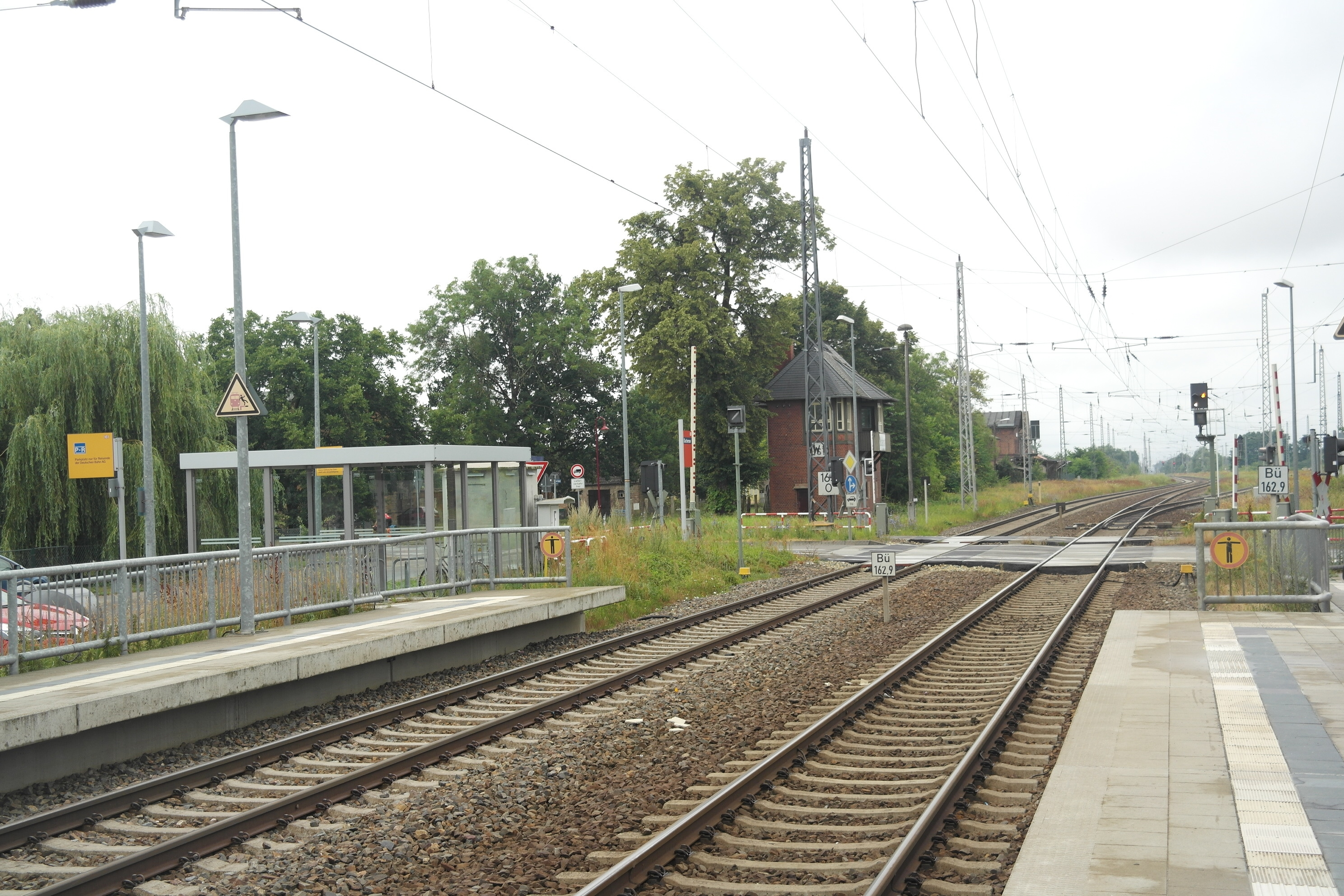
- 2013

General information
- Location: Am Bahnhof, 17398 Ducherow; Mecklenburg-Vorpommern, Germany
- Coordinates: 53°45′44″N 13°47′52″E
- Owner: Deutsche Bahn
- Operator: DB Station&Service
- Lines: Angermünde–Stralsund railway (KBS 203); Ducherow–Heringsdorf–Wolgaster Fähre railway (closed 1945)
- Platforms: 2 side platforms
- Tracks: 2
- Train operators: DB Regio Nordost

Construction
- Accessible: Yes

Other information
- Station code: 1370
- DS100 code: WDU
- IBNR: 8011438
- Category: 6
- Website: www.bahnhof.de

History
- Opened: 16 March 1863; 163 years ago
- Electrified: 23 September 1988; 37 years ago

Services
Preceding station	DB Regio Nordost	Following station
Anklam towards Stralsund Hbf	RE 3	Ferdinandshof towards Jüterbog or Lutherstadt Wittenberg Hbf
Anklam towards Stralsund Hbf	RE 30	Ferdinandshof towards Angermünde
Location
- Location within Mecklenburg-Vorpommern Location within Germany Location within Europe

Ducherow (German: Bahnhof Ducherow) is a railway station in the town of Ducherow, Mecklenburg-Vorpommern, Germany. The station lies on the Angermünde–Stralsund railway and the train services are operated by Deutsche Bahn. The station received new platforms in 2005.

In the 2026 timetable the following lines stop at the station:

Line	Route	Frequency
RE 3	Stralsund – Greifswald – Ducherow – Angermünde – Eberswalde – Berlin – Ludwigsfelde – Jüterbog	120 min
RE 30	Stralsund – Greifswald – Ducherow – Pasewalk – Prenzlau – Angermünde	120 min
