= Statue of Kurt Christoph Graf von Schwerin =

Statue in Berlin, Germany

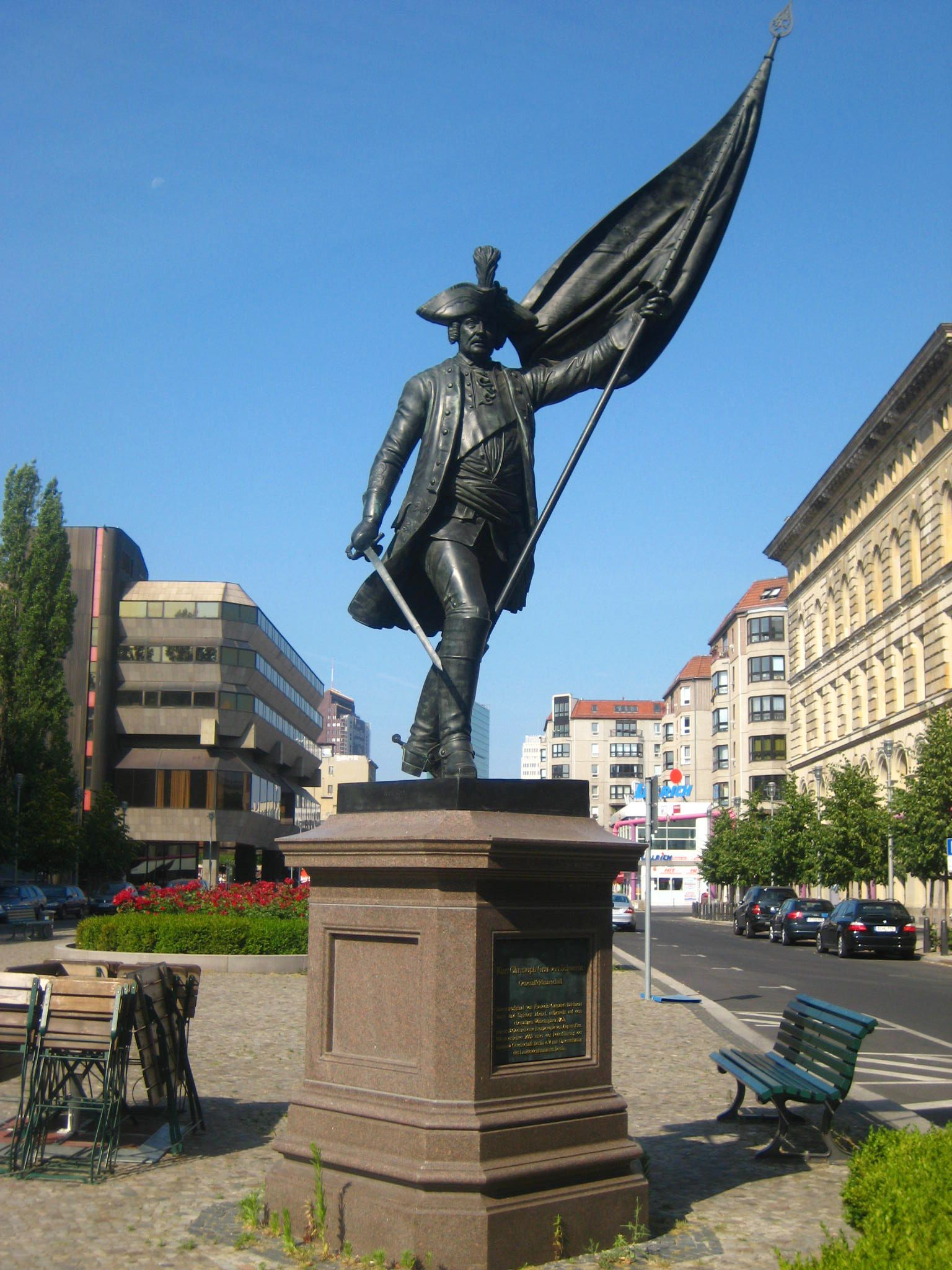
- The sculpture in 2010
- Artist: August Kiss
- Subject: Kurt Christoph Graf von Schwerin
- Location: Berlin, Germany

The statue of Kurt Christoph Graf von Schwerin is a bronze sculpture by August Kiss at Zietenplatz in Berlin, Germany.
