= Neuendorf A =

- Ortsteil of Ducherow
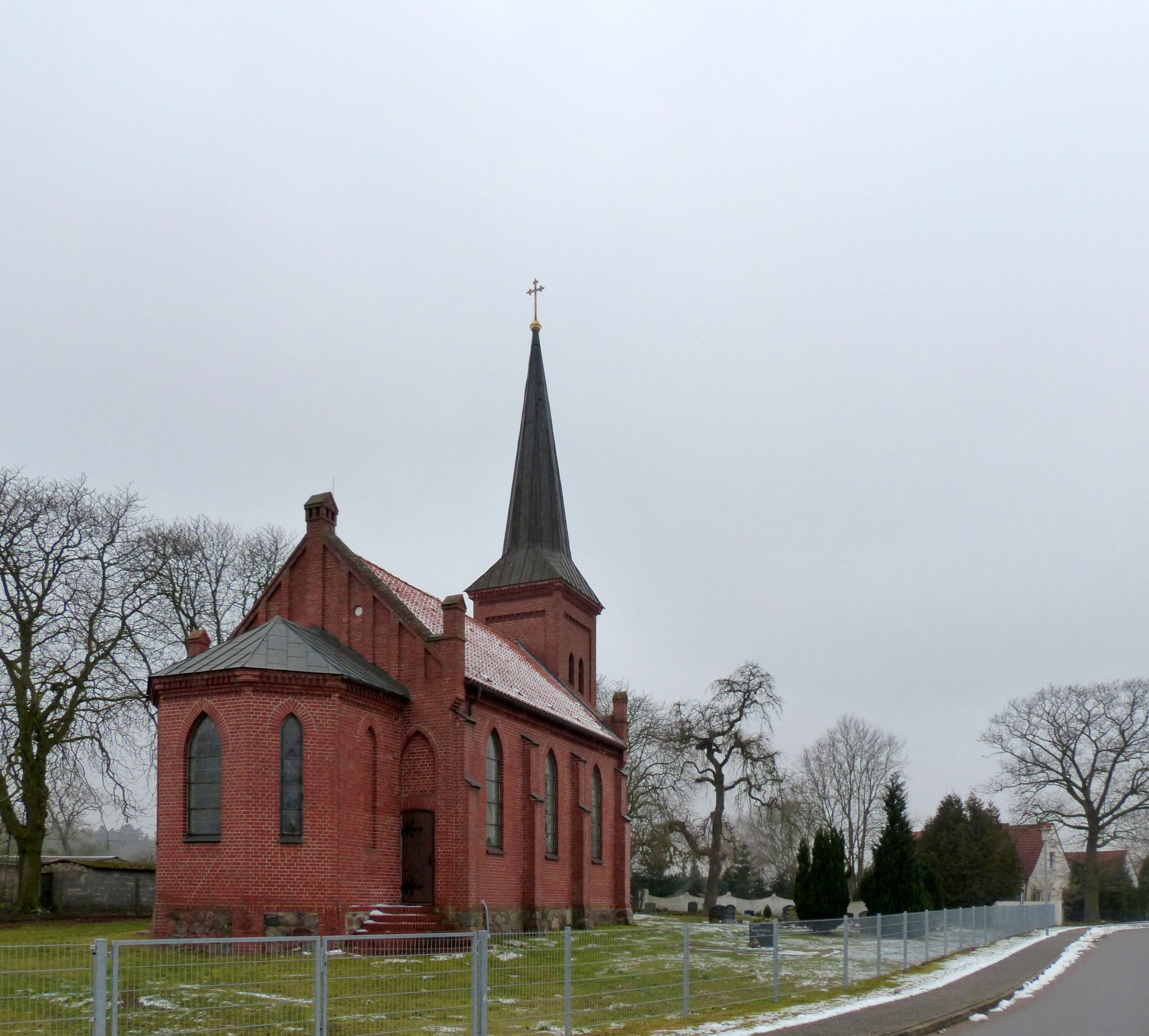
- A church in Neuendorf
- Interactive map of Neuendorf A
- Location within Germany Location within Mecklenburg-Vorpommern
- Coordinates: 53°44′N 13°50′E
- Country: Germany
- State: Mecklenburg-Vorpommern
- District: Vorpommern-Greifswald
- Municipality: Ducherow

Area
  - Total: 13.90 km^{2} (5.37 sq mi)
- Elevation: 7 m (23 ft)

Population (2010-12-31)
  - Total: 147
  - Density: 10.6/km^{2} (27.4/sq mi)
- Time zone: UTC+01:00 (CET)
  - Summer (DST): UTC+02:00 (CEST)
- Postal codes: 17379
- Dialling codes: 039777
- Vehicle registration: VG, OVP
- Website: www.amt-anklam-land.de

Neuendorf A is a village and a former municipality in the Vorpommern-Greifswald district, in Mecklenburg-Vorpommern, Germany. The municipality consisted of Neuendorf itself and the village of Kurtshagen. Since 1 January 2012, it is part of the municipality Ducherow.
