= Doris Gluth =

German middle-distance runner

Personal information
- Nationality: German
- Born: 19 December 1955 (age 70)

Sport
- Sport: Middle-distance running
- Event: 800 metres

Doris Gluth (born 19 December 1955) is a German middle-distance runner. She competed in the women's 800 metres at the 1976 Summer Olympics.
