= Hans Graf von Schwerin-Löwitz =

German politician (1847–1918)

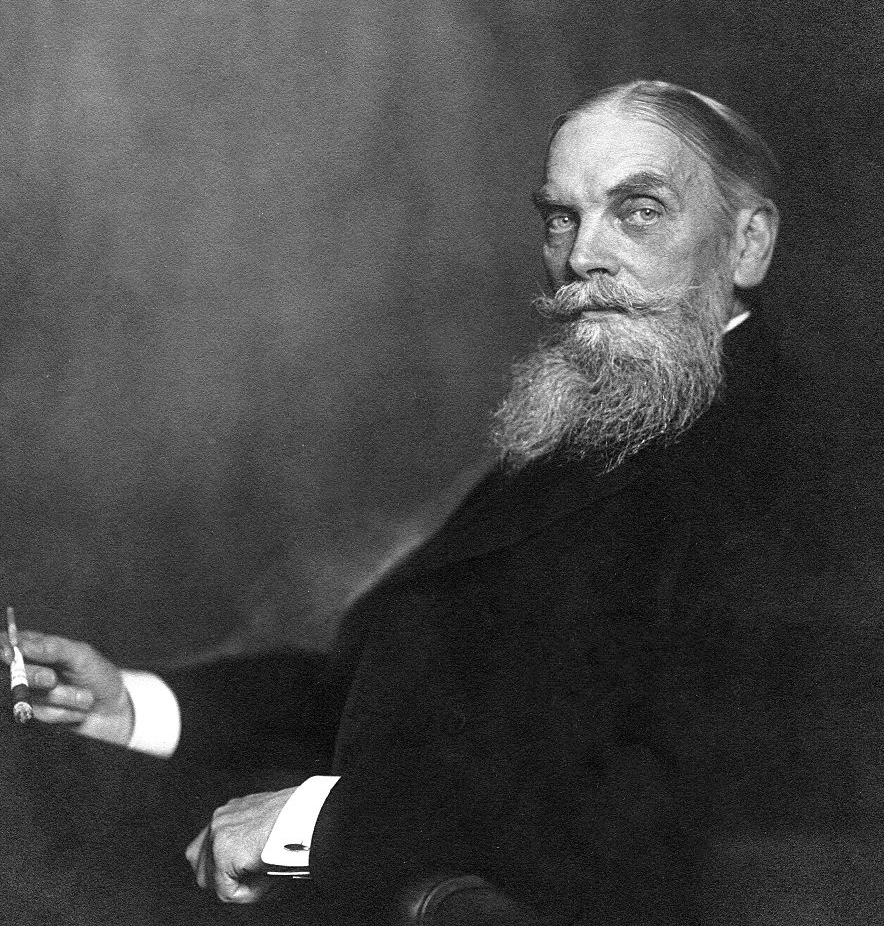
- Hans von Schwerin-Löwitz c. 1918

President of the Reichstag
- In office 1 March 1910 – 7 February 1912
- Monarch: Wilhelm II
- Preceded by: Udo zu Stolberg-Wernigerode
- Succeeded by: Johannes Kaempf

Personal details
- Born: 19 May 1847 Ducherow, Province of Pomerania, Kingdom of Prussia, German Empire
- Died: 4 November 1918 (aged 71) Berlin, Kingdom of Prussia, German Empire
- Party: German Conservative Party

Hans Axel Tammo Graf von Schwerin-Löwitz (19 May 1847, Ducherow – 4 November 1918, Berlin) was a German politician for German Conservative Party and officer.

== Biography ==
Until 1881, Hans Graf von Schwerin-Löwitz was an active officer (Rittmeister) and Flügeladjutant in Saxony. He then managed his own manor, was an Okrajnega Representative beginning in 1901, President of the Prussian country's economy College and was a member of the German Agriculture Council in 1896 as Chairman of the Chamber of Agriculture for Bezirkseisenbahnrat and Pomerania.

From March 1910 to February 1912, he was President of the German Reichstag. He had earlier served there as deputy starting in 1893. From 1896, he was a representative of the constituency of Stettin 1 in the Prussian House of Representatives, and from 1912 to 1918, he became the President.

Schwerin-Löwitz then became a member of the Bimetallisten Committee of the German Reichstag. During the World War I. He represented the Confederation of Farmers on the Board of Trustees of the imperial grain body.

== Legacy ==
A preserved steam locomotive on the Brecon Mountain Railway in Wales carries his name, "Graf Schwerin-Löwitz".
