= 1975 European Athletics Indoor Championships – Women's 1500 metres =

The women's 1500 metres event at the 1975 European Athletics Indoor Championships was held on 8 and 9 March in Katowice.

== Medalists ==
Gold	Silver	Bronze
Natalia Andrei; Romania	Tatyana Kazankina; Soviet Union	Ellen Wellmann; West Germany

== Results ==
=== Heats ===
Held on 8 March.
First 3 from each heat (Q) and the next 2 fastest (q) qualified for the semifinals.

Rank	Heat	Name	Nationality	Time	Notes
1	2	Ellen Wellmann	West Germany	4:17.5	Q
2	2	Tamara Pangelova	Soviet Union	4:17.6	Q
3	2	Rumyana Chavdarova	Bulgaria	4:17.6	Q
4	2	Ulrike Klapezynski	East Germany	4:17.6	q
5	2	Mary Stewart	Great Britain	4:21.5	q
6	2	Marie-Françoise Dubois	France	4:22.7	
7	1	Tatyana Kazankina	Soviet Union	4:23.0	Q
8	1	Christiane Stoll	East Germany	4:23.2	Q
9	1	Natalia Andrei	Romania	4:23.9	Q
10	1	Francine Peeters	Belgium	4:26.3	
11	1	Urszula Prasek	Poland	4:30.1	
12	1	Vasilena Amzina	Bulgaria	4:36.4	
13	1	Božena Sudická	Czechoslovakia	4:38.9	
14	2	Neşe Çetin	Turkey	4:46.8	

=== Final ===
Held on 9 March.

Rank	Name	Nationality	Time	Notes
1st place, gold medalist(s)	Natalia Andrei	Romania	4:14.7	
2nd place, silver medalist(s)	Tatyana Kazankina	Soviet Union	4:14.8	
3rd place, bronze medalist(s)	Ellen Wellmann	West Germany	4:16.2	
4	Tamara Pangelova	Soviet Union	4:16.5	
5	Ulrike Klapezynski	East Germany	4:18.4	
6	Mary Stewart	Great Britain	4:18.6	
7	Rumyana Chavdarova	Bulgaria	4:23.2	
8	Christiane Stoll	East Germany	4:28.1	
