= Ndew Niang =

Senegalese footballer

Personal information
- Nationality: Senegalese
- Born: 20 August 1954 (age 71)

Sport
- Sport: Middle-distance running
- Event: 800 metres

Ndew Niang (born 20 August 1954) is a Senegalese middle-distance runner. She competed in the women's 800 metres at the 1976 Summer Olympics. She was the first woman to represent Senegal at the Olympics.

Niang was also a footballer, and was captain of the Gazelles club of Dakar, the leading women's team in Senegal. In September 1977, she was signed by the French professional club Red Star de Champigny Cœully; a few days earlier, she had won the 1500 metres gold medal at the West African Games in Lagos.
