= Małujowice =

- Village
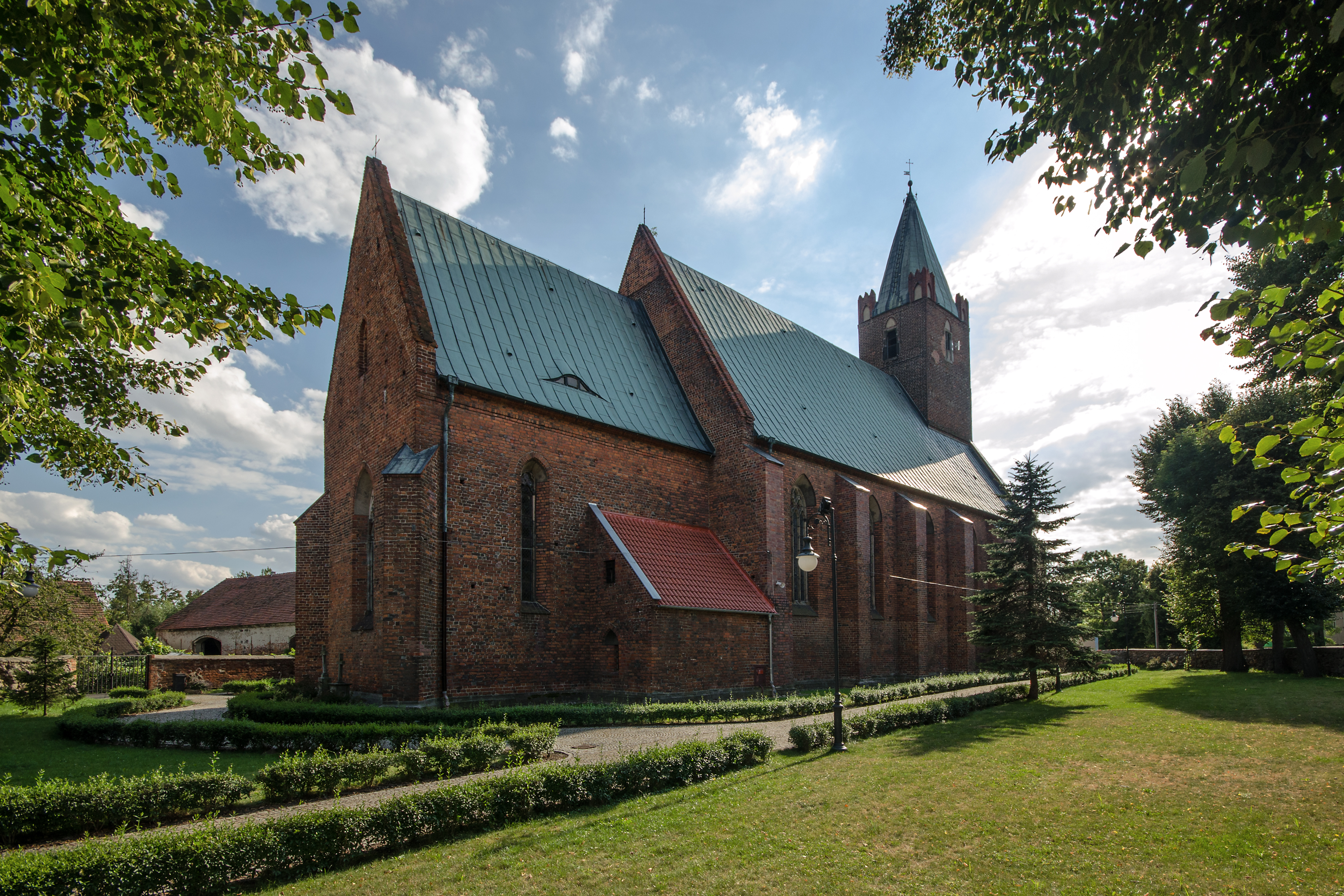
- Saint James the Greater Church

- Location within Poland
- Coordinates: 50°50′51″N 17°22′51″E
- Country: Poland
- Voivodeship: Opole
- County: Brzeg
- Gmina: Skarbimierz
- First mentioned: 1288
- Population (approx.): 430
- Time zone: UTC+1 (CET)
  - Summer (DST): UTC+2 (CEST)
- ISO 3166 code: POL
- Vehicle registration: OB

Małujowice [mawujɔˈvʲit͡sɛ] (German: Mollwitz) is a village in the administrative district of Gmina Skarbimierz, within Brzeg County, Opole Voivodeship, in south-western Poland. Małujowice houses the landmark Gothic Saint James the Greater church, designated a Historic Monument of Poland, which contains elaborate 14th-century frescoes.

== History ==
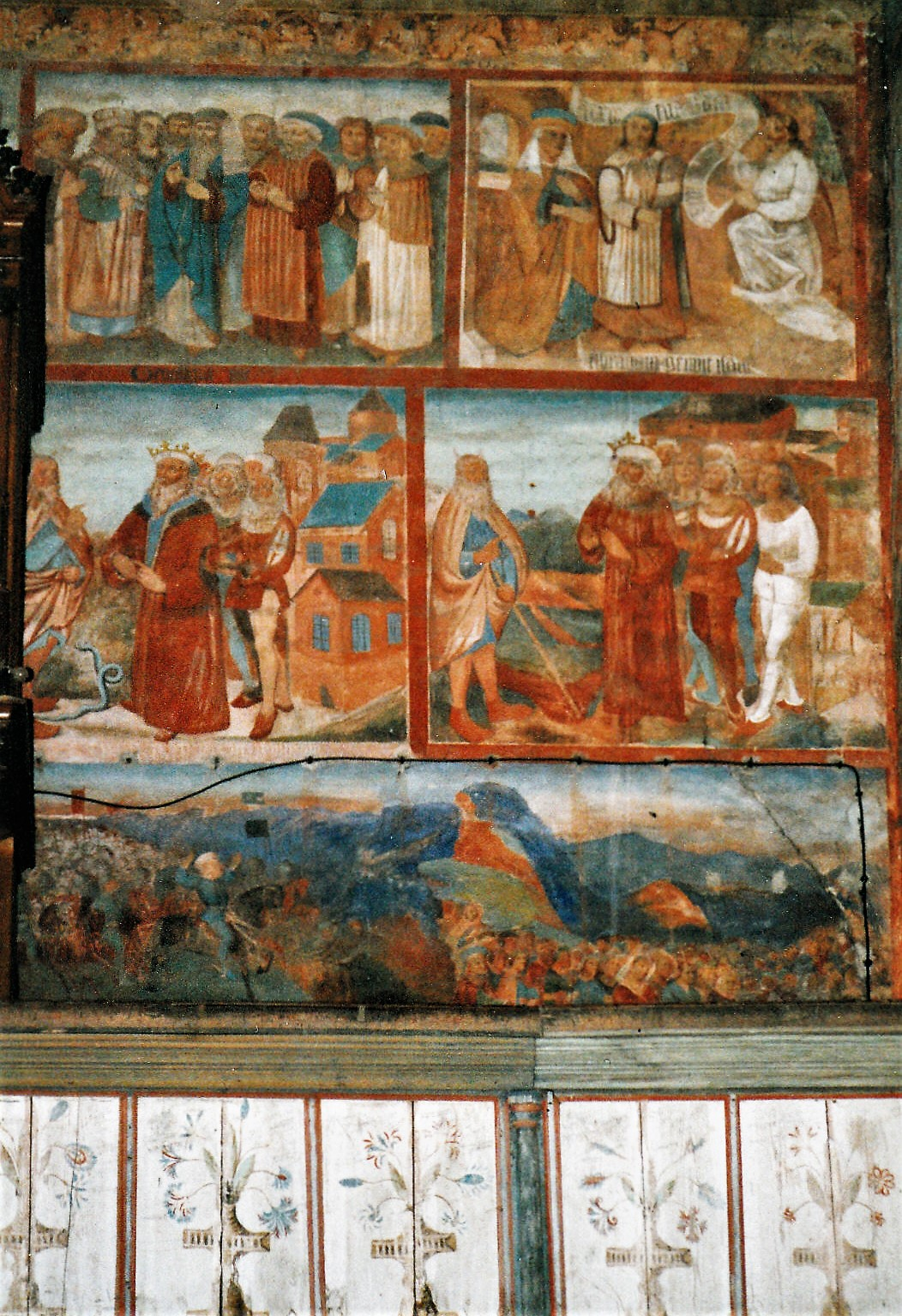
Frescoes in the Saint James church

The village was first mentioned in 1288 under the Latinized form Malewicz, and then in 1315 as Maluyewicz, when it was part of fragmented Piast-ruled Poland. The name of the village is of Polish origin and comes from the Polish word mały, which means "small", referring to its size.

On 10 April 1741, it was the site of the Battle of Mollwitz between Prussia and Austria, won by the Prussians.
