= Valentina Gerasimova =

Personal information
- Born: May 15, 1948 (age 78) Karaganda, Kazakh SSR, Soviet Union

Sport
- Sport: Track and field

Valentina Gerasimova (born May 15, 1948) is a retired Soviet era track and field athlete specializing in middle distances. She competed in the 1976 Olympics. She entered the event as the world record holder, having run a 1:56.0 in Kiev just a month earlier in qualifying for the Olympics (though the mark had not yet been ratified as the world record, which it was after the Olympics). That time was a second and a half improvement on the previous record set by Bulgarian Svetla Zlateva and proved to be her personal best in the event.

In the Montreal Olympics, she qualified for the semi-finals but was unable to make the final with a sub-par performance, as 6 of the qualifiers ahead of her bettered the standing Olympic record. In the final, teammate Tatyana Kazankina took Gerasimova's world record, improving an additional second plus to 1:54.94.
