= Elfi Zinn =

German middle-distance runner

Medal record

Women's athletics

Representing East Germany

Olympic Games
| Bronze medal – third place | 1976 Montreal | 800 m |

European Indoor Championships
| Silver medal – second place | 1973 Rotterdam | 800 m |

Elfi Zinn (née Rost, born 24 August 1953 in Rathebur) is a German middle distance runner who specialised in the 800 metres.

She won the silver medal at the 1973 European Indoor Championships and the bronze medal at the 1976 Summer Olympics.

In domestic competitions, she represented the sports club SC Neubrandenburg. She became East German indoor champion in 1973 and 1976.

Her personal best time was 1:55.60 minutes, achieved at the 1976 Summer Olympics. This places her third on the German all-time list, only behind Sigrun Wodars and Christine Wachtel.
