= Rathebur =

- Ortsteil of Ducherow
- Interactive map of Rathebur
- Location within Germany Location within Mecklenburg-Vorpommern
- Coordinates: 53°44′N 13°47′E
- Country: Germany
- State: Mecklenburg-Vorpommern
- District: Vorpommern-Greifswald
- Town: Ducherow

Area
  - Total: 9.14 km^{2} (3.53 sq mi)
- Elevation: 7 m (23 ft)

Population (2006-12-31)
  - Total: 164
  - Density: 17.9/km^{2} (46.5/sq mi)
- Time zone: UTC+01:00 (CET)
  - Summer (DST): UTC+02:00 (CEST)
- Postal codes: 17398
- Dialling codes: 039726
- Vehicle registration: OVP
- Website: www.amt-anklam-land.de

Rathebur is a village and a former municipality in the Vorpommern-Greifswald district, in Mecklenburg-Vorpommern, Germany. Since 7 June 2009, it is part of the municipality Ducherow.

== History ==
From 1648 to 1720, Rathebur was part of Swedish Pomerania. From 1720 to 1945, it was part of the Prussian Province of Pomerania, from 1945 to 1952 of the State of Mecklenburg-Vorpommern, from 1952 to 1990 of the Bezirk Neubrandenburg of East Germany and since 1990 again of Mecklenburg-Vorpommern.

Since 7 June 2009, Rathebur has been a part of the municipality Ducherow.
