= Maritta Politz =

German middle-distance runner

Personal information
- Nationality: German
- Born: 18 May 1950 (age 76) Dessau-Roßlau, West Germany

Sport
- Sport: Middle-distance running
- Event: 800 metres

Maritta Politz (later Cierpinski, born 18 May 1950) is a German middle-distance runner. She competed in the women's 800 metres at the 1972 Summer Olympics. She is married to the athlete Waldemar Cierpinski.
