= Kurt Christoph Graf von Schwerin =

German general (1684–1757)

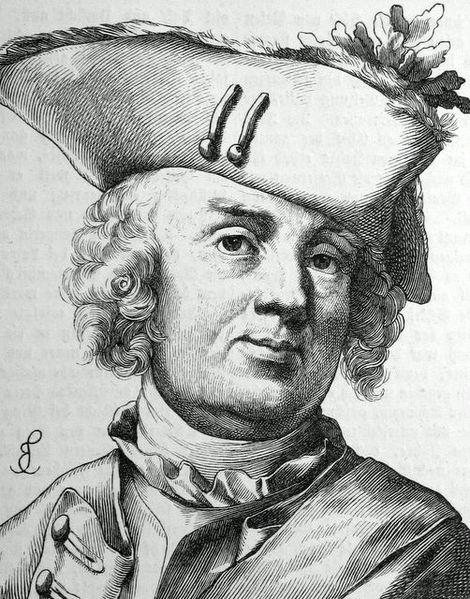
- Born: 26 October 1684; Löwitz, Swedish Pomerania, Swedish Empire
- Died: 6 May 1757 (aged 72); Prague, Kingdom of Bohemia, Holy Roman Empire
- Military career
- Allegiance: Netherlands; Mecklenburg-Schwerin; Prussia
- Branch: Infantry
- Service years: c. 1700–1757
- Rank: Field Marshal
- Conflicts: War of the Spanish Succession; Battle of Ramillies; Battle of Malplaquet; Great Northern War; Battle of Gadebusch; First Silesian War; Battle of Mollwitz; Seven Years' War; Battle of Prague †

Kurt Christoph Graf von Schwerin (26 October 1684 – 6 May 1757) was a Prussian Generalfeldmarschall, one of the leading commanders under Frederick the Great.

== Biography ==
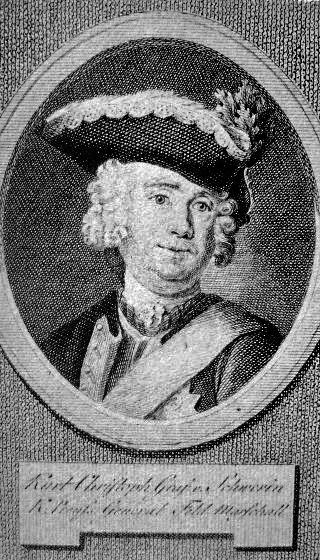
19th Century Engraving of von Schwerin

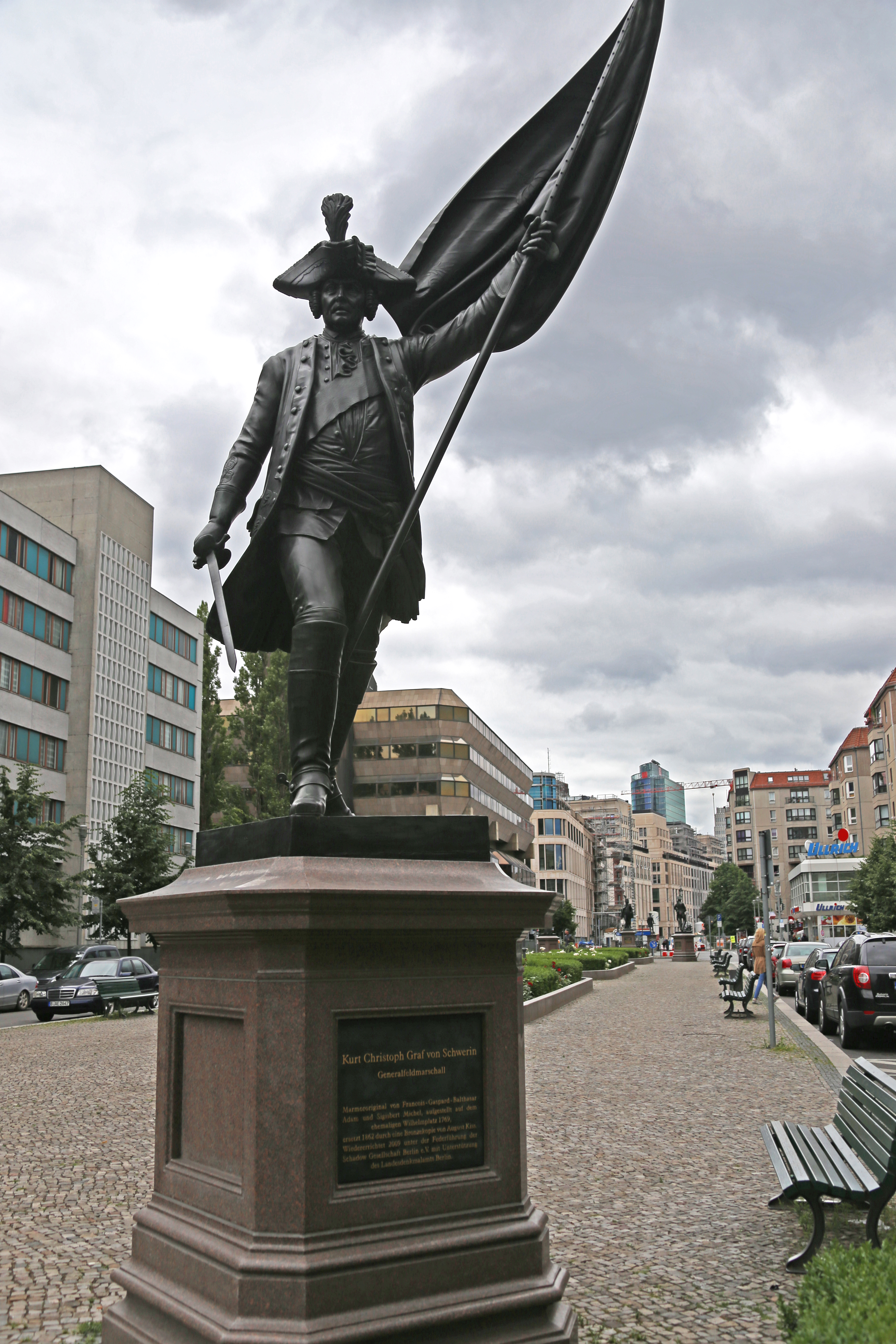
Statue of Field Marshal Kurt von Schwerin in the Zietenplatz in Berlin

He was born in Löwitz, Swedish Pomerania, and at an early age entered the Dutch army, with which he served at Schellenberg and at Blenheim.

In 1707 he became a lieutenant-colonel in the army of the duke of Mecklenburg-Schwerin, and was present at Ramillies and Malplaquet, and with the Swedish commander Stenbock at Gadebusch. In 1713 he was with Charles XII of Sweden in his captivity at Bender, and in 1718 was made major-general.

In 1719 he opposed the Hanoverian Army which invaded Mecklenburg (in the course of which he fought a brilliant action at Walsmühlen on 6 March 1719), and in the following year entered the service of the king of Prussia. At first he was employed in diplomatic missions, but in January 1722 – 1723 he received the command of an infantry regiment. In 1730, as a major-general, he was a member of the court martial which tried the crown prince Frederick for desertion, and in 1733, at the head of a Prussian army, conducted with great skill the delicate and difficult task of settling the Mecklenburg question.

In the following year he became lieutenant-general and in 1739 general of infantry. During the life-time of King Frederick William, Schwerin was also employed in much administrative work. Frederick the Great, on his accession, promoted Schwerin to the rank of general field marshal and made him a count. Early in the First Silesian War, he justified his sovereign's choice by his brilliant leadership at the Battle of Mollwitz (10 April 1741), which, when he had persuaded the king to leave the battlefield explaining that he may be captured as a defeat was likely, converted a doubtful battle into a victory which decided for the time being the fate of Silesia.

After the conclusion of the war he was governor of the important fortresses of Brieg and Neisse. In the Second Silesian War (1744–1745), Schwerin commanded the army which, marching from Glatz, met the king's army under the walls of Prague, and in the siege and capture of that place he played a distinguished part (10 September 1744).

Some time afterwards, the king being compelled to retreat from Bohemia, Schwerin again distinguished himself, but, resenting a real or fancied slight, retired to his estate, to which, and its inhabitants, he devoted his energies during the years of peace.

He reappeared on the field at the outbreak of the Third Silesian War (1756), and during the first campaign conducted the war on the Silesian side of Bohemia; and in 1757, following the same route as in 1744, again joined Frederick at Prague. On 6 May followed the Battle of Prague; leading on a regiment of the left wing to the attack with its colours in his hand, he shouted "Let all brave Prussians follow me!" after which he was struck and killed by a cannonball. Thomas Carlyle gives his cry as, "Heran, meine Kinder" ("This way, boys!").

== Commemorations ==
Frederick erected a statue on the Wilhelmplatz (today part of Wilhelmstraße) to his foremost soldier, and a monument on the field of Prague commemorates the place where he fell. Since 1889 the 14th (3rd Pomeranians) Infantry of the German army had borne his name.
