= Svetla Zlateva =

Bulgarian sprinter (born 1952)

Personal information
- Born: 25 February 1952 (age 74) Gorna Oryahovitsa, Bulgaria

Sport
- Sport: Track and field
Medal record
Representing Bulgaria
European Indoor Championships
Silver medal – second place	1981 Grenoble	800 metres
Bronze medal – third place	1971 Sofia	4x400 m relay
Bronze medal – third place	1972 Grenoble	800 metres
Summer Universiade
Bronze medal – third place	1977 Sofia	800 metres

Svetla Stefanova Zlateva (Bulgarian: Светла Стефанова Златева; born 25 February 1952) is a retired Bulgarian sprinter and middle-distance runner who specialized in the 400 and 800 metres. She is a former world record holder in the latter event. In 1973, she was the winner of the first Balkan Athlete of the Year award.

== Career ==
She was born in Gorna Oryahovitsa, and represented the club Levski Sofia. She finished sixth in the 800 metres at the 1970 European Indoor Championships. At the 1971 European Indoor Championships she finished fourth in the 400 metres and won a bronze medal in the 4 x 400 metres relay. She then won the 800 metres bronze medal at the 1972 European Indoor Championships, finished fourth at the 1973 European Indoor Championships3 and again at the 1974 European Indoor Championships. She finished fifth at the 1977 European Indoor Championships and won the silver medal at the 1981 European Indoor Championships.

In winning an 800 metres medal at the 1972 European Indoor Championships, she was a part of a strong tradition of Bulgarian 800 metres runners, who won medals at the European Indoor Championships in 1972, 1973, 1975, 1976, 1977, 1978 and 1979. Other than Zlateva, these medals were taken by Stefka Yordanova, Rositsa Pekhlivanova, Nikolina Shtereva, Lilyana Tomova and Totka Petrova.

Zlateva also competed in the Olympic Games twice. At the 1972 Summer Olympics she competed in 800 metres, winning her initial heat with the result 1:58.93 minutes. She finished second in her semi-final, and then fourth in the final race with 1:59.72 minutes. 1:58.93 was an Olympic record, and Zlateva even led the first 600 metres of the final race, but was overcome by both Hildegard Falck, Nijolė Sabaitė and Gunhild Hoffmeister; Falck deleting Zlateva's Olympic record. However, Zlateva improved Falck's world record by 0.97 seconds, when she ran in 1:57.48 minutes in Athens on 24 August 1973. She retained the record until 12 June 1976, when Soviet Valentina Gerasimova ran in 1:56.0 minutes. At her second Olympic Games in 1976, Zlateva attacked her own personal best time. She first repeated the victory in the initial heat, then finished third in her semi-final with 1:57.93 minutes, and then sixth in the final race with 1:57.21 minutes. She also competed in the relay race, but the team failed to progress from round one. 1.57.21 minutes remained her personal best time. She had 52.9 seconds in the 400 metres, achieved in 1973.

She became Bulgarian 400 metres champion in 1971 and 1976, and both 800 and 1500 metres champion in 1973. She became Bulgarian indoor champion in the 400 metres in 1971, 1972 and 1973 and in the 800 metres in 1981.

== Personal life ==
Zlateva was once married to Olympic wrestler Ivan Kolev. During this time she was known as Svetla Zlateva-Koleva (Bulgarian: Светла Златева-Колева).

Records
Preceded by Hildegard Falck	Women's 800 metres world record holder 1973–1976	Succeeded by Valentina Gerasimova
