= Tatyana Kazankina =

Russian runner

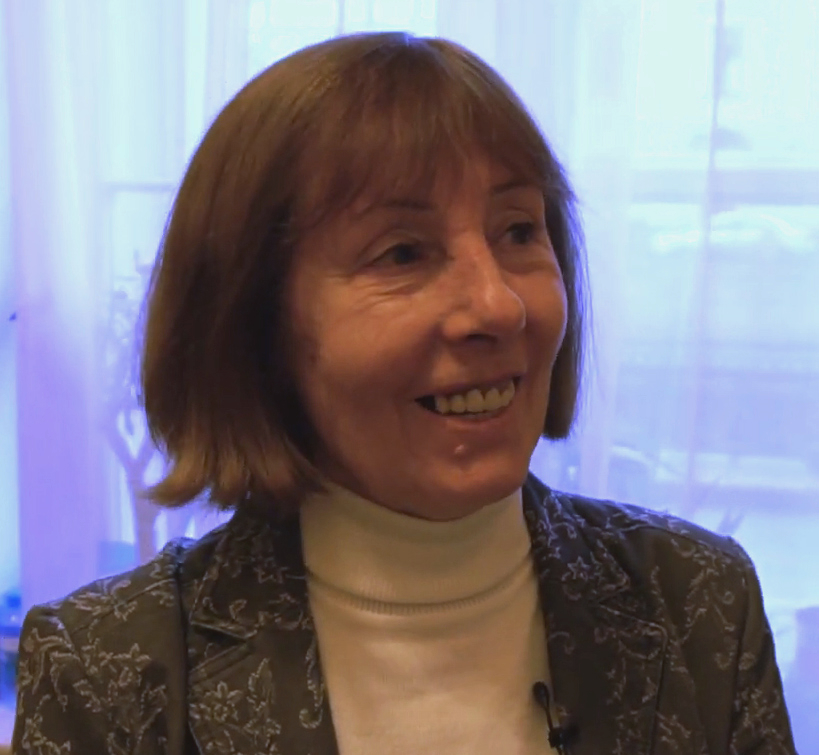
- Tatyana Kazankina in November 2019

Personal information
- Born: December 17, 1951 (age 74) Petrovsk, Soviet Union
Medal record
Women's athletics
Representing the Soviet Union
Olympic Games
| Gold medal – first place | 1976 Montreal | 800 m |
| Gold medal – first place | 1976 Montreal | 1500 m |
| Gold medal – first place | 1980 Moscow | 1500 m |
World Championships
| Bronze medal – third place | 1983 Helsinki | 3000 m |
European Indoor Championships
| Silver medal – second place | 1975 Katowice | 1500 m |

Tatyana Vasilyevna Kazankina (Russian: Татья́на Васи́льевна Каза́нкина; born 17 December 1951 in Petrovsk, Soviet Union) is a Russian former runner who set seven world records and won a total of three gold medals at the Olympic Games for the Soviet Union. She was also awarded the Order of the Red Banner of Labour and the title Honoured Master of Sports of the USSR in 1976. Kazankina competed for VSS Burevestnik.

A month before the 1976 Olympic Games in Montreal, Kazankina became the first woman to run 1500 m in under 4 minutes, her time of 3:56.0 beating Ludmila Bragina's world record by 5.4 seconds. She won the 1500 m and 800 m in the Montreal Games, setting a world record in the latter. In 1980, she ran the 1500 m in 3:52.47, becoming the first woman to run the distance faster than Paavo Nurmi. This stood as a world record for thirteen years.

Her career came to an abrupt end in September 1984, when she was suspended for 18 months for refusing to undertake a drugs test after winning a 1500 m race in 3:58.63 in Paris.

Apart from her sports achievements, Kazankina is known for her scientific works. She graduated from the Faculty of Economics at the Leningrad State University in 1975. Later, she defended her dissertation for the Candidate of Pedagogical Science degree at the Lesgaft Institute of Physical Education and worked as a lecturer until 1997. She is the author of more than 20 scientific works.

Kazankina lives in Saint Petersburg where she worked at the State Committee of Physical Culture and Tourism of Russian Federation.

In 2023, she criticized the International Olympic Committee for requiring Russian athletes to compete under a neutral flag, calling the idea of them condemning the Russian invasion of Ukraine "absurd".

== See also ==
- List of doping cases in sport

Records
| Preceded by (Soviet Union) Valentina Gerasimova | Women's 800 metres World Record Holder; 26 July 1976 – 12 June 1980 | Succeeded by (Soviet Union) Nadezhda Olizarenko |
| Preceded by (Soviet Union) Ludmila Bragina | Women's 1500 m World Record Holder; 28 June 1976 – 11 September 1993 | Succeeded by (China) Qu Yunxia |
| Preceded by (Soviet Union) Svetlana Ulmasova | Women's 3000 m World Record Holder; 26 August 1984 – 12 September 1993 | Succeeded by (China) Zhang Linli |
Sporting positions
| Preceded by (Soviet Union) Svetlana Ulmasova | Women's 3000 m Best Year Performance; 1983 – 1984 | Succeeded by (United States) Mary Slaney |
Awards
| Preceded by (Soviet Union) Faina Melnik | Women's Track & Field Athlete of the Year; 1976 | Succeeded by (East Germany) Rosemarie Ackermann |
