= List of French Athletics Championships winners (women) =

The French Athletics Championships (French: Championnats de France d'athlétisme) is a series of annual outdoor competition in the sport of athletics, organised by the Fédération française d'athlétisme (FFA; French Athletics Federation), which serve as the French national championships. The winners of the events are typically French nationals, though foreign athletes have also won at the championships, typically competing through invitation or as a foreign athlete based at an athletics club in France. Most typical is the presence of African athletes from the Françafrique region.

== Events ==
=== 100 metres ===
- 1960: Catherine Capdevielle
- 1961: Michèle Lurot
- 1962: Michèle Lurot
- 1963: Claude Bouix
- 1964: Danièle Gueneau
- 1965: Gabrielle Meyer
- 1966: Gabrielle Meyer
- 1967: Gabrielle Meyer
- 1968: Sylviane Telliez
- 1969: Sylviane Telliez
- 1970: Sylviane Telliez
- 1971: Sylviane Telliez
- 1972: Sylviane Telliez
- 1973: Sylviane Telliez
- 1974: Sylviane Telliez
- 1975: Sylviane Telliez
- 1976: Chantal Réga
- 1977: Annie Alizé
- 1978: Chantal Réga
- 1979: Chantal Réga
- 1980: Chantal Réga
- 1981: Rose-Aimée Bacoul
- 1982: Rose-Aimée Bacoul
- 1983: Rose-Aimée Bacoul
- 1984: Marie-France Loval
- 1985: Marie-Christine Cazier
- 1986: Laurence Bily
- 1987: Laurence Bily
- 1988: Laurence Bily
- 1989: Laurence Bily
- 1990: Laurence Bily
- 1991: Marie-José Pérec
- 1992: Laurence Bily
- 1993: Valérie Jean-Charles
- 1994: Odiah Sidibé
- 1995: Odile Singa
- 1996: Odiah Sidibé
- 1997: Frédérique Bangué
- 1998: Frédérique Bangué
- 1999: Katia Benth
- 2000: Christine Arron
- 2001: Frédérique Bangué
- 2002: Sylviane Félix
- 2003: Christine Arron
- 2004: Christine Arron
- 2005: Sylvie Mballa Éloundou
- 2006: Véronique Mang

=== 200 metres ===
- 1960: Catherine Capdevielle
- 1961: Michèle Lurot
- 1962: Michèle Lurot
- 1963: Michèle Lurot
- 1964: Monique Noirot
- 1965: Gabrielle Meyer
- 1966: Gabrielle Meyer
- 1967: Sylviane Telliez
- 1968: Nicole Pani
- 1969: Sylviane Telliez
- 1970: Sylviane Telliez
- 1971: Sylviane Telliez
- 1972: Sylviane Telliez
- 1973: Sylviane Telliez
- 1974: Emma Sulter
- 1975: Chantal Réga
- 1976: Chantal Réga
- 1977: Annie Alizé
- 1978: Chantal Réga
- 1979: Chantal Réga
- 1980: Chantal Réga
- 1981: Rose-Aimée Bacoul
- 1982: Rose-Aimée Bacoul
- 1983: Rose-Aimée Bacoul
- 1984: Liliane Gaschet
- 1985: Marie-Christine Cazier
- 1986: Marie-Christine Cazier
- 1987: Marie-Christine Cazier
- 1988: Marie-Christine Cazier
- 1989: Odile Singa
- 1990: Fabienne Ficher
- 1991: Valérie Jean-Charles
- 1992: Marie-José Pérec
- 1993: Maguy Nestoret
- 1994: Odile Singa
- 1995: Marie-José Pérec
- 1996: Delphine Combe
- 1997: Christine Arron
- 1998: Sylviane Félix
- 1999: Aïda Diop (SEN)
- 2000: Muriel Hurtis-Houairi
- 2001: Fabé Dia
- 2002: Muriel Hurtis-Houairi
- 2003: Katia Benth
- 2004: Christine Arron
- 2005: Christine Arron
- 2006: Sylviane Félix

=== 400 metres ===
- 1960: Josette Baujard
- 1961: Évelyne Lebret
- 1962: Évelyne Lebret
- 1963: Maryvonne Dupureur
- 1964: Maryvonne Dupureur
- 1965: Monique Noirot
- 1966: Monique Noirot
- 1967: Monique Noirot
- 1968: Colette Besson
- 1969: Nicole Duclos
- 1970: Éliane Jacq
- 1971: Colette Besson
- 1972: Nicole Duclos
- 1973: Chantal Leclerc
- 1974: Chantal Leclerc
- 1975: Marie-Françoise Dubois
- 1976: Patricia Darbonville
- 1977: Catherine Delachanal
- 1978: Patricia Darbonville
- 1979: Catherine Delachanal
- 1980: Sophie Malbranque
- 1981: Sophie Malbranque
- 1982: Marie-Christine Champenois
- 1983: Raymonde Naigre
- 1984: Raymonde Naigre
- 1985: Fabienne Ficher
- 1986: Nathalie Simon
- 1987: Fabienne Ficher
- 1988: Marie-José Pérec
- 1989: Aïssatou Tandian (SEN)
- 1990: Evelyne Elien
- 1991: Viviane Dorsile
- 1992: Elsa Devassoigne
- 1993: Francine Landre
- 1994: Francine Landre
- 1995: Evelyne Elien
- 1996: Elsa Devassoigne
- 1997: Marie-Louise Bévis
- 1998: Amy Mbacké Thiam (SEN)
- 1999: Amy Mbacké Thiam (SEN)
- 2000: Amy Mbacké Thiam (SEN)
- 2001: Mireille Nguimgo (CMR)
- 2002: Mireille Nguimgo (CMR)
- 2003: Fatou Bintou Fall (SEN)
- 2004: Solen Désert-Mariller
- 2005: Amy Mbacké Thiam (SEN)
- 2006: Amy Mbacké Thiam (SEN)

=== 800 metres ===
- 1960: Maryvonne Dupureur
- 1961: Michèle Niau
- 1962: Nicole Goullieux
- 1963: Maryvonne Dupureur
- 1964: Maryvonne Dupureur
- 1965: Évelyne Lebret
- 1966: Claudette Actis
- 1967: Maryvonne Dupureur
- 1968: Maryvonne Dupureur
- 1969: Maryvonne Dupureur
- 1970: Colette Besson
- 1971: Chantal Jouvhomme
- 1972: Martine Duvivier
- 1973: Martine Duvivier
- 1974: Madeleine Thomas
- 1975: Madeleine Thomas
- 1976: Martine Rooms
- 1977: Marie-Françoise Dubois
- 1978: Martine Rooms
- 1979: Véronique Renties
- 1980: Véronique Renties
- 1981: Nathalie Thoumas
- 1982: Nathalie Thoumas
- 1983: Nathalie Thoumas
- 1984: Florence Giolitti
- 1985: Nathalie Thoumas
- 1986: Nathalie Thoumas
- 1987: Barbara Gourdet
- 1988: Barbara Gourdet
- 1989: Nathalie Thoumas
- 1990: Christine Jaunin
- 1991: Florence Giolitti
- 1992: Viviane Dorsile
- 1993: Barbara Gourdet
- 1994: Patricia Djaté-Taillard
- 1995: Séverine Foulon
- 1996: Viviane Dorsile
- 1997: Karen Goetze
- 1998: Viviane Dorsile
- 1999: Patricia Djaté-Taillard
- 2000: Laetitia Valdonado
- 2001: Virginie Fouquet
- 2002: Aurélie Coulaud
- 2003: Virginie Fouquet
- 2004: Élisabeth Grousselle
- 2005: Bouchra Ghezielle
- 2006: Latifa Essarokh

=== 1500 metres ===
- 1969: Maryvonne Dupureur
- 1970: Catherine Michaud
- 1971: Catherine Michaud-Bultez
- 1972: Nicole Mory
- 1973: Yolande Roche
- 1974: Francie Larrieu Smith (USA)
- 1975: Madeleine Thomas
- 1976: Joke van Gerven (NED)
- 1977: Joëlle De Brouwer
- 1978: Véronique Renties
- 1979: Véronique Renties
- 1980: Véronique Renties
- 1981: Ghislaine Roussel
- 1982: Véronique Rush
- 1983: Martine Fays
- 1984: Annette Sergent
- 1985: Annette Sergent
- 1986: Nathalie Froget
- 1987: Patricia Demilly
- 1988: Patricia Demilly
- 1989: Marie-Pierre Duros
- 1990: Farida Fatès
- 1991: Véronique Pongérard
- 1992: Frédérique Quentin
- 1993: Blandine Bitzner-Ducret
- 1994: Blandine Bitzner-Ducret
- 1995: Frédérique Quentin
- 1996: Frédérique Quentin
- 1997: Frédérique Quentin
- 1998: Frédérique Quentin
- 1999: Yamna Oubouhou
- 2000: Yamna Oubouhou
- 2001: Hanane Sabri-Baala
- 2002: Maria Martins
- 2003: Latifa Essarokh
- 2004: Bouchra Ghezielle (MAR)
- 2005: Hind Dehiba
- 2006: Hind Dehiba

=== 3000 metres ===
The 3000 metres was replaced as the standard shortest women's long-distance track event by the 5000 metres in 1995.

- 1972: Françoise Nicolas
- 1973: Françoise Nicolas
- 1974: Sonja Castelein (BEL)
- 1975: Joëlle De Brouwer
- 1976: Chantal Navarro
- 1977: Christine Seeman
- 1978: Joëlle De Brouwer
- 1979: Annick Loir
- 1980: Joëlle De Brouwer
- 1981: Joëlle De Brouwer
- 1982: Martine Pajot
- 1983: Annette Sergent
- 1984: Annette Sergent
- 1985: Annette Sergent
- 1986: Françoise Bonnet
- 1987: Marie-Pierre Duros
- 1988: Marie-Pierre Duros
- 1989: Farida Fatès
- 1990: Annette Sergent
- 1991: Marie-Pierre Duros
- 1992: Marie-Pierre Duros
- 1993: Annette Sergent
- 1994: Farida Fatès

=== 5000 metres ===
- 1995: Rosario Murcia
- 1996: Farida Fatès
- 1997: Zahia Dahmani
- 1998: Blandine Bitzner-Ducret
- 1999: Fatima Yvelain
- 2000: Fatima Yvelain
- 2001: Fatima Yvelain
- 2002: Fatima Yvelain
- 2003: Seloua Ouaziz (MAR)
- 2004: Christelle Daunay
- 2005: Margaret Maury
- 2006: Christine Bardelle

=== 10,000 metres ===
- 1985: Maria Lelut
- 1986: Jocelyne Villeton
- 1987: Jocelyne Villeton
- 1988: Marcianne Mukamurenzi (RWA)
- 1989: Christine Loiseau
- 1990: Rosario Murcia
- 1991: Annick Clouvel
- 1992: Rosario Murcia
- 1993: Rosario Murcia
- 1994: Nicole Lévèque
- 1995: Nadia Prasad
- 1996: Chantal Dällenbach
- 1997: Zahia Dahmani
- 1998: Muriel Linsolas
- 1999: Zahia Dahmani
- 2000: Rakiya Quétier-Maraoui
- 2001: Berhane Adere (ETH)
- 2002: Fatima Yvelain
- 2003: Berhane Adere (ETH)
- 2004: Margaret Maury
- 2005: Not held
- 2006: Christelle Daunay

=== 10K run ===
- 1996: Chantal Dällenbach
- 1997: Zahia Dahmani
- 1998: Fatima Yvelain
- 1999: Fatima Yvelain
- 2000: Zahia Dahmani
- 2001: Chantal Dällenbach
- 2002: Hafida Gadi
- 2003: Fatima Yvelain
- 2004: Rakiya Quétier-Maraoui
- 2005: Fatiha Klilech-Fauvel

=== Half marathon ===
- 1992: Maria Rebelo
- 1993: Annick Clouvel
- 1994: Nicole Lévèque
- 1995: Christine Mallo
- 1996: Muriel Linsolas
- 1997: Muriel Linsolas
- 1998: Chantal Dällenbach
- 1999: Fatima Yvelain
- 2000: Chantal Dällenbach
- 2001: Zahia Dahmani
- 2002: Hafida Gadi
- 2003: Corinne Rault
- 2004: Christelle Daunay
- 2005: Hafida Gadi

=== 25K run ===
The 25K run was replaced by the half marathon in 1992. The 1990 championship course was short of the full distance by 515 metres.

- 1984: Jocelyne Villeton
- 1985: Maria Lelut
- 1986: Chantal Langlacé
- 1987: Dominique Rembert
- 1988: Eliane Rudereau
- 1989: Marie-Hélène Ohier
- 1990: Dominique Rembert
- 1991: Jocelyne Villeton

=== Marathon ===
- 1980: Joëlle Audibert
- 1981: Chantal Navarro
- 1982: Chantal Langlacé
- 1983: Sylviane Lévesque
- 1984: Chantal Langlacé
- 1985: Sylviane Lévesque
- 1986: Françoise Bonnet
- 1987: Cassandra Mihailovic
- 1988: Odile Poirot
- 1989: Martine Houdayer
- 1990: Maria Lelut-Rebelo
- 1991: Marie-Hélène Ohier
- 1992: Sylvie Bornet
- 1993: Maria Rebelo
- 1994: Maria Rebelo
- 1995: Chantal Dällenbach
- 1996: Nadia Prasad
- 1997: Isabelle Guirot
- 1998: Annick Clouvel
- 1999: Rakiya Quétier-Maraoui
- 2000: Chantal Dällenbach
- 2001: Chantal Dällenbach
- 2002: Céline Cormerais
- 2003: Not held
- 2004: Céline Cormerais
- 2005: Corinne Raux
- 2006: Svetlana Pretot

=== 100K run ===
- 1982: Stéphanie Mazoin
- 1983: Martine Planus
- 1984: Chantal Langlacé
- 1985: Yvette Rossy
- 1986: Monique Exbrayat
- 1987: Monique Exbrayat
- 1988: Marie-France Plas
- 1989: Huguette Jouault
- 1990: Huguette Jouault
- 1991: Huguette Jouault
- 1992: Danielle Geffroy
- 1993: Huguette Jouault
- 1994: Béatrice Reymann
- 1995: Sylvie Laville
- 1996: Martine Cubizolles
- 1997: Huguette Jouault
- 1998: Muriel Brionne
- 1999: Magali Maggiolini
- 2000: Annie Floris
- 2001: Karine Herry
- 2002: Karine Herry
- 2003: Karine Herry
- 2004: Karine Herry
- 2005: Karine Herry
- 2006: Karine Herry

=== 24-hour run ===
- 1992: Pascale Mahe
- 1993: Pascale Mahe
- 1994: Marie Bertrand
- 1995: Marie Bertrand
- 1996: Pascale Mahe
- 1997: Marie Bertrand
- 1998: Marie Bertrand
- 1999: Joëlle Semur
- 2000: Joëlle Semur
- 2001: Véronique Jehanno
- 2002: Véronique Jehanno
- 2003: Joëlle Semur
- 2004: Brigitte Bec
- 2005: Brigitte Bec
- 2006: Véronique Jehanno

=== 3000 metres steeplechase ===
- 2000: Céline Rajot
- 2001: Laurence Duquénoy
- 2002: Élodie Olivarès
- 2003: Céline Rajot
- 2004: Élodie Olivarès
- 2005: Yamina Bouchaouante
- 2006: Élodie Olivarès

=== 80 metres hurdles ===
The 80 metres hurdles was replaced as the standard women's sprint hurdles event by the 100 metres hurdles in 1969.

- 1960: Denise Guénard
- 1961: Denise Guénard
- 1962: Denise Guénard
- 1963: Marlène Canguio
- 1964: Marlène Canguio
- 1965: Denise Guénard
- 1966: Danièle Gueneau
- 1967: Danièle Gueneau
- 1968: Jeanne Schoebel

=== 100 metres hurdles ===
- 1969: Marlène Canguio
- 1970: Jeanne Schoebel
- 1971: Jeanne Schoebel
- 1972: Jacqueline André
- 1973: Chantal Marin
- 1974: Chantal Réga
- 1975: Chantal Réga
- 1976: Nadine Prévost
- 1977: Sylvie Tarlin
- 1978: Laurence Lebeau
- 1979: Laurence Elloy
- 1980: Laurence Lebeau
- 1981: Michèle Chardonnet
- 1982: Laurence Elloy
- 1983: Michèle Chardonnet
- 1984: Laurence Elloy
- 1985: Laurence Elloy
- 1986: Laurence Elloy
- 1987: Florence Colle
- 1988: Anne Piquereau
- 1989: Monique Éwanjé-Épée
- 1990: Monique Éwanjé-Épée
- 1991: Monique Éwanjé-Épée
- 1992: Anne Piquereau
- 1993: Patricia Girard
- 1994: Anne Piquereau
- 1995: Patricia Girard
- 1996: Nicole Ramalalanirina (MAD)
- 1997: Patricia Girard
- 1998: Nicole Ramalalanirina
- 1999: Patricia Girard
- 2000: Nicole Ramalalanirina
- 2001: Patricia Girard
- 2002: Patricia Girard
- 2003: Patricia Girard
- 2004: Reïna-Flor Okori
- 2005: Linda Ferga
- 2006: Adrianna Lamalle

=== 400 metres hurdles ===
- 1976: Catherine Richard
- 1977: Catherine Richard
- 1978: Danièle Lairloup
- 1979: Dominique Laval
- 1980: Dominique Le Disses
- 1981: Dominique Le Disses
- 1982: Chantal Réga
- 1983: Nawal El Moutawakel (MAR)
- 1984: Dominique Le Disses
- 1985: Hélène Huart
- 1986: Chantal Beaugeant
- 1987: Hélène Huart
- 1988: Hélène Huart
- 1989: Marie-José Pérec
- 1990: Marie-Christine Cazier
- 1991: Marie-Christine Cazier
- 1992: Carole Nelson
- 1993: Carole Nelson
- 1994: Carole Nelson
- 1995: Anne Renaud
- 1996: Anne Renaud
- 1997: Anne Renaud
- 1998: Mame Tacko Diouf (SEN)
- 1999: Mame Tacko Diouf (SEN)
- 2000: Gnima Touré (SEN)
- 2001: Sylvanie Morandais
- 2002: Sylvanie Morandais
- 2003: Mame Tacko Diouf (SEN)
- 2004: Sylvanie Morandais
- 2005: Sylvanie Morandais
- 2006: Dora Jemaa

=== High jump ===
- 1960: Joëlle Girard
- 1961: Florence Petry-Amiel
- 1962: Monique Bantégny
- 1963: Geneviève Laureau
- 1964: Denise Guénard
- 1965: Geneviève Laureau
- 1966: Geneviève Laureau
- 1967: Ghislaine Barnay
- 1968: Ghislaine Barnay
- 1969: Ghislaine Barnay
- 1970: Evelyne Constans
- 1971: Marie-Christine Debourse
- 1972: Monique Horrent
- 1973: Marie-Christine Wartel
- 1974: Marie-Christine Debourse
- 1975: Marie-Christine Debourse
- 1976: Marie-Christine Debourse
- 1977: Marie-Christine Debourse
- 1978: Florence Picaut
- 1979: Véronique Dumon
- 1980: Sylvie Prenveille
- 1981: Brigitte Rougeron
- 1982: Maryse Éwanjé-Épée
- 1983: Maryse Éwanjé-Épée
- 1984: Maryse Éwanjé-Épée
- 1985: Maryse Éwanjé-Épée
- 1986: Brigitte Rougeron
- 1987: Madely Beaugendre
- 1988: Maryse Éwanjé-Épée
- 1989: Madely Beaugendre
- 1990: Odile Lesage
- 1991: Jana Brenkusová (TCH)
- 1992: Sandrine Fricot
- 1993: Maryse Éwanjé-Épée
- 1994: Sandrine Fricot
- 1995: Maryse Éwanjé-Épée
- 1996: Maryse Éwanjé-Épée
- 1997: Marie Collonvillé
- 1998: Sabrina De Leeuw (BEL)
- 1999: Irène Tiendrébéogo (BUR)
- 2000: Sabrina De Leeuw (BEL)
- 2001: Lucie Finez
- 2002: Gaëlle Niaré
- 2003: Gaëlle Niaré
- 2004: Gaëlle Niaré
- 2005: Melanie Skotnik
- 2006: Eunice Barber

=== Pole vault ===
- 1995: Caroline Ammel
- 1996: Amandine Homo
- 1997: Aurore Pignot
- 1998: Amandine Homo
- 1999: Amandine Homo
- 2000: Caroline Ammel
- 2001: Vanessa Boslak
- 2002: Marie Poissonnier
- 2003: Vanessa Boslak
- 2004: Vanessa Boslak
- 2005: Vanessa Boslak
- 2006: Elisabete Tavares Ansel (POR)

=== Long jump ===
- 1960: Madeleine Thétu
- 1961: Madeleine Thétu
- 1962: Odette Ducas
- 1963: Madeleine Lhuillery
- 1964: Claude Bouix
- 1965: Denise Guénard
- 1966: Denise Guénard
- 1967: Marlène Canguio
- 1968: Odette Ducas
- 1969: Odette Ducas
- 1970: Odette Ducas
- 1971: Odette Ducas
- 1972: Odette Ducas
- 1973: Odette Ducas
- 1974: Jacqueline Curtet
- 1975: Sylvie Tarlin
- 1976: Sue Reeve (GBR)
- 1977: Sylvie Tarlin
- 1978: Jacqueline Curtet
- 1979: Yannick Gacon
- 1980: Florence Picaut
- 1981: Odile Madkaud
- 1982: Jeanne Nilusmas
- 1983: Marie-Odile Legrand
- 1984: Géraldine Bonnin
- 1985: Nadine Dubois
- 1986: Nadine Fourcade
- 1987: Nadine Fourcade
- 1988: Nadine Fourcade
- 1989: Florence Colle
- 1990: Caroline Aubert
- 1991: Muriel Leroy
- 1992: Caroline Missoudan
- 1993: Corinne Hérigault
- 1994: Nadine Caster
- 1995: Nadine Caster
- 1996: Eunice Barber (SLE)
- 1997: Linda Ferga
- 1998: Eunice Barber (SLE)
- 1999: Eunice Barber
- 2000: Aurélie Félix
- 2001: Aurélie Félix
- 2002: Aurélie Félix
- 2003: Aurélie Félix
- 2004: Nadine Caster
- 2005: Céline Nyanga
- 2006: Éloyse Lesueur-Aymonin

=== Triple jump ===
- 1990: Sylvie Borda
- 1991: Sandrine Domain
- 1992: Sylvie Borda
- 1993: Caroline Honoré
- 1994: Betty Lise
- 1995: Valérie Guiyoule
- 1996: Caroline Honoré
- 1997: Betty Lise
- 1998: Betty Lise
- 1999: Françoise Mbango Etone (CMR)
- 2000: Kéné Ndoye (SEN)
- 2001: Françoise Mbango Etone (CMR)
- 2002: Françoise Mbango Etone (CMR)
- 2003: Thaimi O'Reilly (ITA)
- 2004: Amy Zongo
- 2005: Amy Zongo
- 2006: Amy Zongo

=== Shot put ===
- 1960: Raymonde Rysman
- 1961: Bernadette Burger
- 1962: Bernadette Burger
- 1963: Marthe Bretelle
- 1964: Christiane Nuss
- 1965: Christiane Nuss
- 1966: Claudie Cuvelier
- 1967: Claudie Cuvelier
- 1968: Maryvonne Maney
- 1969: Claudie Cuvelier
- 1970: Marie-Louise Parguel
- 1971: Maryvonne Maney
- 1972: Simone Créantor
- 1973: Léone Bertimon
- 1974: Léone Bertimon
- 1975: Léone Bertimon
- 1976: Léone Bertimon
- 1977: Léone Bertimon
- 1978: Léone Bertimon
- 1979: Léone Bertimon
- 1980: Léone Bertimon
- 1981: Simone Créantor
- 1982: Léone Bertimon
- 1983: Léone Bertimon
- 1984: Léone Bertimon
- 1985: Simone Créantor
- 1986: Simone Créantor
- 1987: Simone Créantor
- 1988: Valérie Hanicque
- 1989: Léone Bertimon
- 1990: Annick Lefebvre
- 1991: Annick Lefebvre
- 1992: Krystyna Zabawska (POL)
- 1993: Fabienne Locuty
- 1994: Annick Lefebvre
- 1995: Laurence Manfredi
- 1996: Laurence Manfredi
- 1997: Laurence Manfredi
- 1998: Laurence Manfredi
- 1999: Laurence Manfredi
- 2000: Laurence Manfredi
- 2001: Natalia Lissovskaia
- 2002: Laurence Manfredi
- 2003: Valerie Adams (NZL)
- 2004: Laurence Manfredi
- 2005: Laurence Manfredi
- 2006: Laurence Manfredi

=== Discus throw ===
- 1960: Marthe Bretelle
- 1961: Marthe Bretelle
- 1962: Marthe Bretelle
- 1963: Marthe Bretelle
- 1964: Marthe Bretelle
- 1965: Marthe Bretelle
- 1966: Marthe Bretelle
- 1967: Claudie Cuvelier
- 1968: Claudie Cuvelier
- 1969: Claudie Cuvelier
- 1970: Denise Brial
- 1971: Nicole Pierotti
- 1972: Nicole Pierotti
- 1973: Catherine Bazin
- 1974: Noëlle Marlard
- 1975: Noëlle Marlard
- 1976: Ria Stalman (NED)
- 1977: Noëlle Marlard
- 1978: Frédérique Despierres
- 1979: Frédérique Despierres
- 1980: Isabelle Reynaud
- 1981: Isabelle Accambray
- 1982: Isabelle Accambray
- 1983: Catherine Beauvais
- 1984: Catherine Beauvais
- 1985: Dominique Dupont
- 1986: Isabelle Devaluez
- 1987: Isabelle Devaluez
- 1988: Valérie Hanicque
- 1989: Patricia Katona
- 1990: Agnès Teppe
- 1991: Isabelle Devaluez
- 1992: Isabelle Devaluez
- 1993: Isabelle Devaluez
- 1994: Agnès Teppe
- 1995: Isabelle Devaluez
- 1996: Isabelle Devaluez
- 1997: Isabelle Devaluez
- 1998: Isabelle Devaluez
- 1999: Isabelle Devaluez
- 2000: Mélina Robert-Michon
- 2001: Mélina Robert-Michon
- 2002: Mélina Robert-Michon
- 2003: Mélina Robert-Michon
- 2004: Mélina Robert-Michon
- 2005: Mélina Robert-Michon
- 2006: Mélina Robert-Michon

=== Hammer throw ===
- 1994: Cécile Lignot-Maubert
- 1995: Caroline Fournier (MRI)
- 1996: Caroline Sinoquet
- 1997: Cécile Lignot-Maubert
- 1998: Manuela Montebrun
- 1999: Caroline Fournier (MRI)
- 2000: Manuela Montebrun
- 2001: Manuela Montebrun
- 2002: Manuela Montebrun
- 2003: Manuela Montebrun
- 2004: Manuela Montebrun
- 2005: Manuela Montebrun
- 2006: Stéphanie Falzon

=== Javelin throw ===
- 1960: Suzanne Cathiard
- 1961: Suzanne Cathiard
- 1962: Michèle Demys
- 1963: Michèle Demys
- 1964: Michèle Demys
- 1965: Michèle Demys
- 1966: Andrée Malsert
- 1967: Michèle Demys
- 1968: Andrée Malsert
- 1969: Martine Bordet
- 1970: Martine Bordet
- 1971: Martine Bordet
- 1972: Marie-Jeanne Cretel
- 1973: Clotilde Lambert
- 1974: Annie Boclé
- 1975: Clotilde Lambert
- 1976: Annie Boclé
- 1977: Kate Schmidt (USA)
- 1978: Nicole Besso
- 1979: Murielle Van Thournout
- 1980: Agnès Tchuinté (CMR)
- 1981: Catherine Dupont
- 1982: Catherine Dupont
- 1983: Monika Fiafialoto
- 1984: Nadine Auzeil
- 1985: Monika Fiafialoto
- 1986: Evelyne Giardino
- 1987: Nadine Auzeil
- 1988: Nadine Auzeil
- 1989: Martine Bègue
- 1990: Nadine Auzeil
- 1991: Nadine Auzeil
- 1992: Martine Bègue
- 1993: Martine Bègue
- 1994: Nadine Auzeil
- 1995: Nadine Auzeil
- 1996: Nadine Auzeil
- 1997: Sarah Walter
- 1998: Bina Ramesh
- 1999: Nadine Auzeil
- 2000: Bina Ramesh
- 2001: Nadine Auzeil
- 2002: Sarah Walter
- 2003: Sarah Walter
- 2004: Bina Ramesh
- 2005: Sarah Walter
- 2006: Séphora Bissoly

=== Pentathlon ===
The pentathlon was replaced as the standard women's combined event by the heptathlon in 1980.

- 1960: Jeanine Allaire
- 1961: Denise Guénard
- 1962: Jeanine Allaire
- 1963: Denise Guénard
- 1964: Denise Guénard
- 1965: Denise Guénard
- 1966: Denise Guénard
- 1967: Denise Guénard
- 1968: Denise Guénard
- 1969: Marie-Christine Debourse
- 1970: Odette Ducas
- 1971: Odette Ducas
- 1972: Marie-Christine Debourse
- 1973: Marie-Christine Wartel
- 1974: Florence Picaut
- 1975: Marie-Christine Debourse
- 1976: Marie-Christine Debourse
- 1977: Marie-Christine Debourse
- 1978: Florence Picaut
- 1979: Florence Picaut

=== Heptathlon ===
- 1980: Florence Picaut
- 1981: Florence Picaut
- 1982: Florence Picaut
- 1983: Florence Picaut
- 1984: Chantal Beaugeant
- 1985: Chantal Beaugeant
- 1986: Liliane Ménissier
- 1987: Nadine Debois
- 1988: Chantal Beaugeant
- 1989: Odile Lesage
- 1990: Liliane Ménissier
- 1991: Odile Lesage
- 1992: Nathalie Teppe
- 1993: Not held
- 1994: Guilaine Belperin
- 1995: Marie Collonvillé
- 1996: Nathalie Teppe
- 1997: Guilaine Graw
- 1998: Sophie Marrot
- 1999: Marie Collonvillé
- 2000: Nathalie Teppe
- 2001: Marie Collonvillé
- 2002: Marie Collonvillé
- 2003: Julie Martin
- 2004: Julie Martin
- 2005: Gertrud Bacher (ITA)
- 2006: Antoinette Djimou

=== 5000 metres track walk ===
From 1973 to 1976, the women's 5000 metres walk did not have sanction as an official French Championship race.

- 1973: Jacqueline Daniel
- 1974: Jacqueline Daniel
- 1975: Jacqueline Delassaux
- 1976: Jacqueline Delassaux
- 1977: Jeanine Piroux
- 1978: Jacqueline Delassaux
- 1979: Jeanine Vignat
- 1980: Jeanine Vignat
- 1981: Suzanne Griesbach
- 1982: Suzanne Griesbach
- 1983: Suzanne Griesbach
- 1984: Suzanne Griesbach
- 1985: Suzanne Griesbach
- 1986: Suzanne Griesbach
- 1987: Suzanne Griesbach
- 1988: Suzanne Griesbach
- 1989: Nathalie Fortain

=== 10 kilometres walk ===
From 1979 to 1982, and after 2003, the women's 10 kilometres walk did not have sanction as an official French Championship race. The 2004 event was held over 20 kilometres (which later became the standard distance for women). The event was contested on the track from 1979 to 1989, plus 1995 and 1999.

- 1979: Jeanine Vignat
- 1980: Jeanine Vignat
- 1981: Suzanne Griesbach
- 1982: Suzanne Griesbach
- 1983: Suzanne Griesbach
- 1984: Suzanne Griesbach
- 1985: Jeanine Vignat
- 1986: Suzanne Griesbach
- 1987: Suzanne Griesbach
- 1988: Anne-Catherine Berthonnaud
- 1989: Nathalie Fortain
- 1990: Nathalie Fortain
- 1991: Nathalie Fortain
- 1992: Nathalie Fortain
- 1993: Valérie Lévèque
- 1994: Nora Leksir
- 1995: Anne-Catherine Berthonnaud
- 1996: Valérie Nadaud
- 1997: Anne-Catherine Berthonnaud
- 1998: Nora Leksir
- 1999: Nora Leksir
- 2000: Fatiha Ouali
- 2001: Fatiha Ouali
- 2002: Fatiha Ouali
- 2003: Fatiha Ouali
- 2004: Patricia Garnier
- 2005: Fatiha Ouali

=== 20 kilometres walk ===
The women's 20 kilometres walk championship is typically held on road circuits, but was held as a track walk for the 2003 edition.

- 1998: Nora Leksir
- 1999: Nora Leksir
- 2000: Nora Leksir
- 2001: Christine Guinaudeau
- 2002: Fatiha Ouali
- 2003: Fatiha Ouali
- 2004: Tatiana Denize
- 2005: Christine Guinaudeau
- 2006: Patricia Garnier

=== Cross country (long) ===
- 1960: Nicole Goullieux
- 1961: Nicole Goullieux
- 1962: Dany Yvonnet
- 1963: Nicole Goullieux
- 1964: Yvonne Hérisson
- 1965: Yvonne Hérisson
- 1966: Yvonne Hérisson
- 1967: Yvonne Hérisson
- 1968: Yvonne Hérisson
- 1969: Eliane Camacaris
- 1970: Claudette Brouard
- 1971: Colette Besson
- 1972: Marie-José Phyllis
- 1973: Joëlle Audibert
- 1974: Joëlle Audibert
- 1975: Joëlle De Brouwer
- 1976: Joëlle De Brouwer
- 1977: Joëlle De Brouwer
- 1978: Joëlle De Brouwer
- 1979: Joëlle De Brouwer
- 1980: Martine Oppliger-Bouchonneau
- 1981: Joëlle De Brouwer
- 1982: Jacqueline Lefeuvre
- 1983: Joëlle De Brouwer
- 1984: Joëlle De Brouwer
- 1985: Annette Sergent
- 1986: Annette Sergent
- 1987: Annette Sergent
- 1988: Annette Sergent
- 1989: Annette Sergent
- 1990: Farida Fatès
- 1991: Marie-Pierre Duros
- 1992: Annette Sergent
- 1993: Odile Ohier
- 1994: Maria Rébélo
- 1995: Annette Sergent
- 1996: Farida Fatès
- 1997: Farida Fatès
- 1998: Blandine Bitzner-Ducret
- 1999: Blandine Bitzner-Ducret
- 2000: Rakiya Quétier-Maraoui
- 2001: Rakiya Quétier-Maraoui
- 2002: Rodica Nagel
- 2003: Laurence Duquénoy
- 2004: Margaret Maury
- 2005: Maria Martins
- 2006: Julie Coulaud

=== Cross country (short) ===
- 1998: Rodica Nagel
- 1999: Céline Rajot
- 2000: Yamna Oubouhou
- 2001: Fatima Yvelain
- 2002: Élodie Olivarès
- 2003: Élodie Olivarès
- 2004: Yamna Oubouhou
- 2005: Bouchra Ghezielle
- 2006: Élodie Olivarès

=== Mountain running ===
- 1989: Isabelle Guillot
- 1990: Isabelle Guillot
- 1991: Isabelle Guillot
- 1992: Isabelle Guillot
- 1993: Isabelle Guillot
- 1994: Isabelle Guillot
- 1995: Isabelle Guillot
- 1996: Isabelle Guillot
- 1997: Isabelle Guillot
- 1998: Martine Payet
- 1999: Isabelle Guillot
- 2000: Chantal Dällenbach
- 2001: Hafida Gadi
- 2002: Corinne Raux
- 2003: Patricia Farget
- 2004: Isabelle Guillot
- 2005: Isabelle Guillot

== External sources ==
- List of French Athletics Championships winners on the Fédération française d'athlétisme's website
- List of French Athletics Championships winners (1960—2006) on www.gbrathletics.com
