= 1987 European Cup "A" Final =

These are the full results of the 1987 European Cup "A" Final in athletics which was held on 27 and 28 June 1987 in Prague, Czechoslovakia.

== Team standings ==
Men
Pos.	Nation	Points
1	Soviet Union	117
2	East Germany	114.5
3	Great Britain	99
4	West Germany	88
5	Italy	87
6	Czechoslovakia	73
7	Spain	72
8	Poland	58.5

Women
Pos.	Nation	Points
1	East Germany	119
2	Soviet Union	92
3	Bulgaria	86
4	West Germany	77
5	Great Britain	59.5
6	Czechoslovakia	51.5
7	Poland	45
8	France	45

== Men's results ==
=== 100 metres ===
27 June
Wind: -1.0 m/s

Rank	Lane	Name	Nationality	Time	Notes	Points
1	2	Linford Christie	Great Britain	10.23		8
2	1	Steffen Bringmann	East Germany	10.36		7
3	7	Pierfrancesco Pavoni	Italy	10.38		6
4	3	Viktor Bryzgin	Soviet Union	10.38		5
5	5	José Javier Arqués	Spain	10.42		4
6	6	Luboš Chochlík	Czechoslovakia	10.55		3
7	4	Christian Haas	West Germany	10.60		2
8	8	Joachim Helbik	Poland	10.73		1

=== 200 metres ===
28 June
Wind: +1.5 m/s

Rank	Lane	Name	Nationality	Time	Notes	Points
1	3	Linford Christie	Great Britain	20.63		8
2	2	Steffen Bringmann	East Germany	20.85		7
3	4	Andrey Fedoriv	Soviet Union	20.87		6
4	8	Pierfrancesco Pavoni	Italy	20.91		5
5	5	Jürgen Evers	West Germany	20.92		4
6	7	Jindřich Roun	Czechoslovakia	21.18		3
7	6	José Javier Arqués	Spain	21.20		2
8	1	Czesław Prądzyński	Poland	21.25		1

=== 400 metres ===
27 June

Rank	Lane	Name	Nationality	Time	Notes	Points
1	3	Thomas Schönlebe	East Germany	44.96	=CR	8
2	4	Roger Black	Great Britain	44.99		7
3	6	Edgar Itt	West Germany	45.54		6
4	5	Aleksandr Kurochkin	Soviet Union	45.58		5
5	2	Tomasz Jędrusik	Poland	45.96		4
6	7	António Sánchez	Spain	46.01		3
7	8	Luboš Balošák	Czechoslovakia	46.39		2
8	1	Donato Sabia	Italy	46.56		1

=== 800 metres ===
28 June

Rank	Name	Nationality	Time	Notes	Points
1	Tom McKean	Great Britain	1:45.96		8
2	Donato Sabia	Italy	1:46.38		7
3	Peter Braun	West Germany	1:46.68		6
4	Colomán Trabado	Spain	1:47.13		5
5	Milan Drahoňovský	Czechoslovakia	1:47.24		4
6	Hauke Fuhlbrügge	East Germany	1:47.24		3
7	Piotr Piekarski	Poland	1:48.00		2
8	Valeriy Starodubtsev	Soviet Union	1:48.27		1

=== 1500 metres ===
27 June

Rank	Name	Nationality	Time	Notes	Points
1	José Luis González	Spain	3:45.49		8
2	Steve Cram	Great Britain	3:45.54		7
3	Jens-Peter Herold	East Germany	3:46.19		6
4	Vladimir Graudyn	Soviet Union	3:46.73		5
5	Dieter Baumann	West Germany	3:46.96		4
6	Stefano Mei	Italy	3:47.57		3
7	Piotr Kurek	Poland	3:49.20		2
8	Radim Kunčický	Czechoslovakia	3:49.51		1

=== 5000 metres ===
28 June

Rank	Name	Nationality	Time	Notes	Points
1	José Manuel Abascal	Spain	13:32.87	CR	8
2	Tim Hutchings	Great Britain	13:34.83		7
3	Salvatore Antibo	Italy	13:35.92		6
4	Werner Schildhauer	East Germany	13:36.55		5
5	Steffen Brand	West Germany	13:41.37		4
6	Mikhail Khramov	Soviet Union	14:04.64		3
7	Zdeněk Moravčík	Czechoslovakia	14:20.96		2
8	Wiesław Perszke	Poland	14:28.26		1

=== 10,000 metres ===
27 June

Rank	Name	Nationality	Time	Notes	Points
1	Abel Antón	Spain	28:46.65		8
2	Salvatore Antibo	Italy	28:46.69		7
3	Axel Krippschock	East Germany	28:51.32		6
4	Jon Solly	Great Britain	28:55.84		5
5	Oleg Strizhakov	Soviet Union	28:59.28		4
6	Bogusław Psujek	Poland	29:08.63		3
7	Martin Vrábeľ	Czechoslovakia	29:11.09		2
8	Christoph Herle	West Germany	29:36.35		1

=== 110 metres hurdles ===
28 June
Wind: +0.7 m/s

Rank	Lane	Name	Nationality	Time	Notes	Points
1	7	Igors Kazanovs	Soviet Union	13.48		8
2	6	Colin Jackson	Great Britain	13.53		7
3	2	Aleš Höffer	Czechoslovakia	13.62		6
4	5	Holger Pohland	East Germany	13.62		5
5	4	Tomasz Nagórka	Poland	13.63		4
6	1	Javier Moracho	Spain	13.81		3
7	8	Michael Radzey	West Germany	13.82		2
8	3	Luigi Bertocchi	Italy	14.22		1

=== 400 metres hurdles ===
27 June

Rank	Lane	Name	Nationality	Time	Notes	Points
1	1	Harald Schmid	West Germany	48.67		8
2	7	Max Robertson	Great Britain	49.92		7
3	2	José Alonso	Spain	50.15		6
4	8	Oleg Azarov	Soviet Union	50.48		5
5	3	Stanislav Návesňák	Czechoslovakia	50.49		4
6	5	Uwe Ackermann	East Germany	50.64		3
7	4	Luca Cosi	Italy	51.23		2
8	5	Leszek Rzepakowski	Poland	52.09		1

=== 3000 metres steeplechase ===
28 June

Rank	Name	Nationality	Time	Notes	Points
1	Francesco Panetta	Italy	8:13.47		8
2	Roger Hackney	Great Britain	8:20.68		7
3	Hagen Melzer	East Germany	8:21.23		6
4	Bogusław Mamiński	Poland	8:30.19		5
5	Domingo Ramón	Spain	8:32.90		4
6	Michael Heist	West Germany	8:38.76		3
7	Vitaliy Surin	Soviet Union	8:40.33		2
8	Luboš Gaisl	Czechoslovakia	8:53.45		1

=== 4 × 100 metres relay ===
27 June

Rank	Nation	Athletes	Time	Note	Points
1	Soviet Union	Aleksandr Yevgenyev, Viktor Bryzgin, Vladimir Muravyov, Vladimir Krylov	38.42		8
2	East Germany	Heiko Truppel, Steffen Bringmann, Steffen Schwabe, Frank Emmelmann	39.03		7
3	Italy	Ezio Madonia, Giovanni Bongiorni, Paolo Catalano, Pierfrancesco Pavoni	39.55		6
4	Poland	Joachim Helbik, Zygfryd Swaczyna, Czesław Prądzyński, Andrzej Klimaszewski	39.58		5
	West Germany	Christian Haas, Dirk Schweisfurth, Fritz Heer, Norbert Dobeleit	DNF		0
	Czechoslovakia	Ivo Pištěk, Luboš Chochlík, Jiří Mezihorák, Jindřich Roun	DNF		0
	Spain	Enrique Talavera, Juan José Prado, Ángel Heras, José Javier Arqués	DQ		0
	Great Britain	David Kirton, Linford Christie, Mike McFarlane, Clarence Callender	DQ		0

=== 4 × 400 metres relay ===
28 June

Rank	Lane	Nation	Athletes	Time	Note	Points
1	8	East Germany	Jens Carlowitz, Carlo Niestadt, Mathias Schersing, Thomas Schönlebe	3:00.80		8
2	1	Great Britain	Paul Harmsworth, Brian Whittle, Todd Bennett, Roger Black	3:01.12		7
3	3	West Germany	Norbert Dobeleit, Edgar Itt, Jörg Vaihinger, Harald Schmid	3:01.32		6
4	2	Soviet Union	Arkadiy Kornilov, Vladimir Prosin, Oleg Azarov, Aleksandr Kurochkin	3:03.18		5
5	6	Italy	Marcello Pantone, Tiziano Gemelli, Roberto Ribaud, Donato Sabia	3:03.36		4
6	4	Spain	Cayetano Cornet, Antonio Sánchez, José Alonso, Ángel Heras	3:04.43		3
7	7	Poland	Zbigniew Janus, Ryszard Wichrowski, Marek Sira, Tomasz Jędrusik	3:05.02		2
8	5	Czechoslovakia	Ján Tomko, Jindřich Roun, Dušan Malovec, Luboš Balošák	3:05.55		1

=== High jump ===
27 June

Rank	Name	Nationality	2.05	2.10	2.15	2.20	2.23	2.26	2.29	2.32	2.35	Result	Notes	Points
1	Igor Paklin	Soviet Union	–	–	–	o	–	o	o	o	xxx	2.32		8
2	Ján Zvara	Czechoslovakia	–	–	o	o	o	xo	xo	–	xxx	2.29		7
3	Gerd Wessig	East Germany	–	o	o	o	o	o	xxx			2.26		6
4	Krzysztof Krawczyk	Poland	–	–	o	o	–	o	xxx			2.26		5
5	Gerd Nagel	West Germany	–	–	o	o	xxo	xxx				2.23		4
6	Arturo Ortiz	Spain	o	–	o	xo	xxx					2.20		3
7	Luca Toso	Italy	–	o	o	xxo	xxx					2.20		2
8	Geoff Parsons	Great Britain	–	o	o	xxx						2.15		1

=== Pole vault ===
28 June

Rank	Name	Nationality	4.80	5.00	5.20	5.35	5.50	5.60	5.70	5.80	5.85	Result	Notes	Points
1	Grigoriy Yegorov	Soviet Union	–	–	–	xxo	o	o	xo	xx–	x	5.70		8
2	Zdeněk Lubenský	Czechoslovakia	–	–	o	o	o	o	–	xxx		5.60		7
3	Bernhard Zintl	West Germany	–	o	o	o	xxx					5.50		6
4	Jeff Gutteridge	Great Britain	–	o	o	xxo	xxx					5.35		5
5	Gianni Stecchi	Italy	o	o	xo	xxo	xxx					5.35		4
6	Mike Thiede	East Germany	–	o	o	xxx						5.20		3
7	Alberto Ruiz	Spain	–	xo	o	xxx						5.20		2
	Marian Kolasa	Poland	–	–	xxx							NM		0

=== Long jump ===
27 June

Rank	Name	Nationality	#1	#2	#3	#4	#5	#6	Result	Notes	Points
1	Robert Emmiyan	Soviet Union	8.09	8.06	8.38	x	x	x	8.38	CR	8
2	Marco Delonge	East Germany	7.97	8.04	8.00	–	x	8.01	8.04		7
3	Ivo Krsek	Czechoslovakia	7.97	7.74	7.98	x	x	x	7.98		6
4	Giovanni Evangelisti	Italy	7.87	7.74	7.76	–	7.56	7.84	7.87		5
5	Christian Thomas	West Germany	7.57	7.77	0	7.52	7.68	7.60	7.77		4
6	Stanisław Jaskułka	Poland	7.44	7.52	7.74	x	x	5.91	7.74		3
7	Ángel Hernández	Spain	7.34	6.96	7.35	7.59	7.24	7.30	7.59		2
8	Derrick Brown	Great Britain	x	7.41	x	7.30	x	7.36	7.41		1

=== Triple jump ===
28 June

Rank	Name	Nationality	#1	#2	#3	#4	#5	#6	Result	Notes	Points
1	Oleg Protsenko	Soviet Union	17.58	17.43	17.51	x	x	17.61	17.61		8
2	Zdzisław Hoffmann	Poland	x	x	16.55	x	17.06	x	17.06		7
3	Peter Bouschen	West Germany	16.24	x	16.50	16.98	x	16.10	16.98		6
4	Ivan Slanař	Czechoslovakia	16.65	14.35	x	16.80	x	16.94	16.94		5
5	John Herbert	Great Britain	16.54	x	16.60	16.70	x	16.67	16.70		4
6	Dario Badinelli	Italy	16.38	16.67	x	x	16.42	15.44	16.67		3
7	Dirk Gamlin	East Germany	16.34	14.59	16.27	13.96	16.09w	16.23	16.34		2
8	Antonio Corgos	Spain	15.51	–	15.49	–	16.28	x	16.28		1

=== Shot put ===
27 June

Rank	Name	Nationality	#1	#2	#3	#4	#5	#6	Result	Notes	Points
1	Ulf Timmermann	East Germany	21.57	x	22.01	x	21.70	21.57	22.01		8
2	Alessandro Andrei	Italy	20.65	21.46	20.98	x	21.19	x	21.46		7
3	Remigius Machura	Czechoslovakia	19.78	20.44	20.56	x	21.20	21.40	21.40		6
4	Helmut Krieger	Poland	x	18.94	19.86	20.82	x	x	20.82		5
5	Sergey Smirnov	Soviet Union	19.92	20.74	20.50	x	x	20.31	20.74		4
6	Karsten Stolz	West Germany	20.01	19.76	19.79	x	x	19.79	20.01		3
7	Martín Vara	Spain	16.82	16.96	17.04	x	17.67	x	17.67		2
8	Paul Edwards	Great Britain	17.03	x	16.53	x	16.44	16.44	17.03		1

=== Discus throw ===
28 June

Rank	Name	Nationality	#1	#2	#3	#4	#5	#6	Result	Notes	Points
1	Vaclavas Kidykas	Soviet Union	63.20	64.66	63.82	66.80	64.92	63.84	66.80		8
2	Jürgen Schult	East Germany	62.22	64.88	66.54	66.50	65.06	66.00	66.54		7
3	Rolf Danneberg	West Germany	66.18	63.22	64.30	x	63.70	x	66.18		6
4	Imrich Bugar	Czechoslovakia	59.58	65.48	62.20	x	64.48	x	65.48		5
5	Dariusz Juzyszyn	Poland	61.22	60.44	x	x	62.22	x	62.22		4
6	David Martínez	Spain	57.36	56.80	55.26	x	54.64	x	57.36		3
7	Antonio Roccabella	Italy	x	x	x	55.80	57.02	57.04	57.04		2
8	Paul Mardle	Great Britain	54.96	54.80	x	54.32	56.34	54.30	56.34		1

=== Hammer throw ===
28 June

Rank	Name	Nationality	#1	#2	#3	#4	#5	#6	Result	Notes	Points
1	Sergey Litvinov	Soviet Union	81.60	x	81.70	80.72	82.28	x	82.28		8
2	Ralf Haber	East Germany	78.96	78.34	79.44	78.92	79.76	77.26	79.76		7
3	Christoph Sahner	West Germany	x	73.78	74.48	72.72	74.24	75.28	75.28		6
4	Lucio Serrani	Italy	x	72.16	69.82	71.54	73.20	73.98	73.98		5
5	Francisco Fuentes	Spain	64.94	67.50	67.78	x	69.66	68.46	69.66		4
6	David Smith	Great Britain	x	x	64.94	x	65.56	65.02	65.56		3
7	Milan Malát	Czechoslovakia	x	62.30	64.64	x	x	x	64.64		2
8	Leszek Woderski	Poland	61.86	61.80	64.14	62.36	63.92	63.80	64.14		1

=== Javelin throw ===
27 June

Rank	Name	Nationality	#1	#2	#3	#4	#5	#6	Result	Notes	Points
1	Viktor Yevsyukov	Soviet Union	82.14	82.84	84.18	84.86	x	80.56	84.86		8
2	Klaus Tafelmeier	West Germany	83.30	81.08	x	82.72	x	x	83.30		7
3	Jan Železný	Czechoslovakia	75.30	81.18	x	80.80	x	78.54	81.18		6
4	Mick Hill	Great Britain	x	75.40	75.76	78.24	79.06	79.80	79.80		5
5	Gerald Weiss	East Germany	75.90	78.00	75.96	76.74	75.38	79.00	79.00		4
6	Fabio De Gaspari	Italy	72.64	73.94	74.40	76.06	x	70.82	76.06		3
7	Bogdan Patelka	Poland	73.88	x	x	69.14	71.92		73.88		2
8	Julián Sotelo	Spain	62.62	64.62	61.46	61.00	60.24	x	64.62		1

== Women's results ==
=== 100 metres ===
27 June
Wind: -0.4 m/s

Rank	Name	Nationality	Time	Notes	Points
1	Marlies Göhr	East Germany	10.95		8
2	Anelia Nuneva	Bulgaria	11.08		7
3	Ulrike Sarvari	West Germany	11.30		6
4	Paula Dunn	Great Britain	11.37		5
5	Eva Murková	Czechoslovakia	11.43		4
6	Laurence Bily	France	11.44		3
7	Ewa Kasprzyk	Poland	11.45		2
8	Irina Slyusar	Soviet Union	11.49		1

=== 200 metres ===
28 June
Wind: +1.3 m/s

Rank	Lane	Name	Nationality	Time	Notes	Points
1	6	Silke Gladisch	East Germany	21.99	CR	8
2	4	Nadezhda Georgieva	Bulgaria	22.50		7
3	1	Ewa Kasprzyk	Poland	22.63		6
4	2	Ute Thimm	West Germany	22.87		5
5	3	Maya Azarashvili	Soviet Union	22.88		4
6	7	Paula Dunn	Great Britain	23.17		3
7	8	Magali Seguin	France	23.49		2
8	5	Monika Špičková	Czechoslovakia	23.68		1

=== 400 metres ===
27 June

Rank	Lane	Name	Nationality	Time	Notes	Points
1	7	Petra Müller	East Germany	49.91		8
2	4	Mariya Pinigina	Soviet Union	50.46		7
3	5	Rositsa Stamenova	Bulgaria	51.23		6
4	3	Gisela Kinzel	West Germany	51.69		5
5	1	Fabienne Ficher	France	52.47		4
6	2	Marzena Wojdecka	Poland	52.61		3
7	8	Linda Keough	Great Britain	52.79		2
8	6	Jana Mrovcová	Czechoslovakia	53.02		1

=== 800 metres ===
27 June

Rank	Name	Nationality	Time	Notes	Points
1	Tatyana Samolenko	Soviet Union	1:59.26		8
2	Jarmila Kratochvílová	Czechoslovakia	1:59.26		7
3	Christine Wachtel	East Germany	1:59.54		6
4	Diane Edwards	Great Britain	2:00.21		5
5	Margrit Klinger	West Germany	2:00.47		4
6	Yuliana Marinova	Bulgaria	2:00.52		3
7	Zofia Wieciorkowska	Poland	2:03.36		2
8	Nathalie Thoumas	France	2:05.25		1

=== 1500 metres ===
28 June

Rank	Name	Nationality	Time	Notes	Points
1	Kirsty Wade	Great Britain	4:09.03		8
2	Tatyana Samolenko	Soviet Union	4:09.60		7
3	Andrea Lange	East Germany	4:09.82		6
4	Brigitte Kraus	West Germany	4:10.99		5
5	Florence Giolitti	France	4:11.52		4
6	Nikolina Shtereva	Bulgaria	4:12.40		3
7	Jana Kučeríková	Czechoslovakia	4:12.44		2
8	Barbara Klepka	Poland	4:17.08		1

=== 3000 metres ===
27 June

Rank	Name	Nationality	Time	Notes	Points
1	Ulrike Bruns	East Germany	8:44.48		8
2	Yvonne Murray	Great Britain	8:48.15		7
3	Olga Bondarenko	Soviet Union	8:48.54		6
4	Annette Sergent	France	9:01.52		5
5	Claudia Borgschulze	West Germany	9:03.37		4
6	Jana Kučeríková	Czechoslovakia	9:05.99		3
7	Vanya Stoyanova	Bulgaria	9:16.45		2
8	Wanda Panfil	Poland	9:17.62		1

=== 10,000 metres ===
28 June

Rank	Name	Nationality	Time	Notes	Points
1	Kathrin Ullrich	East Germany	32:45.05		8
2	Angela Tooby	Great Britain	32:46.78		7
3	Natalya Sorokivskaya	Soviet Union	33:10.48		6
4	Radka Naplatanova	Bulgaria	33:31.82		5
5	Maria Lelut	France	33:33.20		4
6	Kerstin Pressler	West Germany	34:02.62		3
7	Alena Močáriová	Czechoslovakia	35:19.46		2
8	Renata Kokowska	Poland	35:41.26		1

=== 100 metres hurdles ===
28 June
Wind: -0.9 m/s

Rank	Lane	Name	Nationality	Time	Notes	Points
1	1	Cornelia Oschkenat	East Germany	12.47	CR	8
2	7	Yordanka Donkova	Bulgaria	12.53		7
3	5	Claudia Zaczkiewicz	West Germany	12.97		6
4	6	Nataliya Grygoryeva	Soviet Union	13.11		5
5	3	Anne Piquereau	France	13.15		4
6	8	Milena Tebichová	Czechoslovakia	13.58		3
7	2	Lesley-Ann Skeete	Great Britain	13.66		2
8	4	Barbara Latos	Poland	13.72		1

=== 400 metres hurdles ===
27 June

Rank	Name	Nationality	Time	Notes	Points
1	Sabine Busch	East Germany	54.23		8
2	Genowefa Błaszak	Poland	55.44		7
3	Yelena Goncharova	Soviet Union	55.70		6
4	Gudrun Abt	West Germany	56.66		5
5	Hélène Huart	France	56.67		4
6	Bonka Peneva	Bulgaria	57.50		3
7	Jennifer Pearson	Great Britain	58.16		2
8	Zuzana Machotková	Czechoslovakia	58.97		1

=== 4 × 100 metres relay ===
27 June

Rank	Lane	Nation	Athletes	Time	Note	Points
1	3	East Germany	Silke Gladisch, Heike Drechsler, Ingrid Auerswald, Marlies Göhr	41.94		8
2	6	Bulgaria	Ginka Zagorcheva, Anelia Nuneva, Nadezhda Georgieva, Yordanka Donkova	42.31	NR	7
3	7	West Germany	Silke Knoll, Ulrike Sarvari, Andrea Thomas, Ute Thimm	43.23		6
4	5	Poland	Joanna Smolarek, Agnieszka Siwek, Jolanta Janota, Ewa Kasprzyk	43.91		5
5	4	France	Françoise Leroux, Christelle Bulteau, Laurence Bily, Muriel Leroy	43.99		4
6	1	Czechoslovakia	Monika Špičková, Daniela Weegerová, Nedežda Bonová, Jana Niková	44.99		3
7	3	Great Britain	Sandra Whittaker, Joan Baptiste, Eleanor Cohen, Paula Dunn	46.42		2
	8	Soviet Union	Olga Zolotaryeva, Natalya Pomoshchnikova, Olga Naumkina, Irina Slyusar	DQ		1

=== 4 × 400 metres relay ===
28 June

Rank	Nation	Athletes	Time	Note	Points
1	Soviet Union	Vineta Ikauniece, Mariya Pinigina, Lyudmila Dzhigalova, Olga Nazarova	3:20.41		8
2	East Germany	Kirsten Emmelmann, Sabine Busch, Heike Drechsler, Petra Müller	3:20.60		7
3	West Germany	Ute Thimm, Karin Lix, Helga Arendt, Gisela Kinzel	3:25.29		6
4	Bulgaria	Malena Andonova, Rositsa Stamenova, Katya Ilieva, Yuliana Marinova	3:26.90		5
5	Poland	Ewa Marcinkowska, Marzena Wojdecka, Elżbieta Kapusta, Genowefa Błaszak	3:29.18		4
6	Great Britain	Carol Finlay, Angela Piggford, Linda Forsyth, Linda Keough	3:31.43		3
7	France	Nathalie Simon, Juliette Mato, Nadine Debois, Fabienne Ficher	3:31.44		2
8	Czechoslovakia	Helena Dziurová, Gabriela Sedláková, Jana Mrovcová, Jarmila Kratochvílová	3:31.96		1

=== High jump ===
28 June

Rank	Name	Nationality	1.80	1.85	1.90	1.96	2.00	2.04	Result	Notes	Points
1	Stefka Kostadinova	Bulgaria	–	o	o	o	xo	xxx	2.00		8
2	Tamara Bykova	Soviet Union							1.96		7
3	Heike Redetzky	West Germany							1.96		6
4	Susanne Beyer	East Germany							1.96		5
5	Brigitte Rougeron	France							1.85		4
6	Jana Brenkusová	Czechoslovakia							1.85		3
7	Janet Boyle	Great Britain							1.85		2
8	Urszula Kielan	Poland							1.80		1

=== Long jump ===
28 June

Rank	Name	Nationality	#1	#2	#3	#4	#5	#6	Result	Notes	Points
1	Heike Drechsler	East Germany	7.17	7.26	x	x	7.12	5.48	7.26		8
2	Galina Chistyakova	Soviet Union	6.94	7.15	x	x	7.14	6.97	7.15		7
3	Sofia Bozhanova	Bulgaria							6.75w		6
4	Eva Murková	Czechoslovakia							6.61		5
5	Jolanta Bartczak	Poland							6.47w		4
6	Mary Berkeley	Great Britain							6.39		3
7	Anette Hellig	West Germany	6.31	x	x	x	x	4.89	6.31		2
8	Nadine Debois	France							6.18		1

=== Shot put ===
28 June

Rank	Name	Nationality	#1	#2	#3	#4	#5	#6	Result	Notes	Points
1	Natalya Lisovskaya	Soviet Union	21.12	21.42	21.56	20.85	x	20.98	21.56	CR	8
2	Ines Müller	East Germany							20.82		7
3	Helena Fibingerová	Czechoslovakia							20.28		6
4	Svetla Mitkova	Bulgaria							19.81		5
5	Claudia Losch	West Germany	18.58	18.66	19.47	x	x	18.88?	19.47		4
6	Judith Oakes	Great Britain							18.25		3
7	Małgorzata Wolska	Poland							17.35		2
8	Leone Bertimon	France							15.71		1

=== Discus throw ===
27 June

Rank	Name	Nationality	#1	#2	#3	#4	#5	#6	Result	Notes	Points
1	Diana Gansky	East Germany	70.94	64.72	68.46	73.06	73.28	73.90	73.90	CR	8
2	Tsvetanka Khristova	Bulgaria							68.26		7
3	Zdeňka Šilhavá	Czechoslovakia							65.04		6
4	Galina Yermakova	Soviet Union							62.22		5
5	Dagmar Galler	West Germany	46.50	59.96	57.36	56.90	52.34	57.86	59.96		4
6	Renata Katewicz	Poland							58.42		3
7	Kathryn Farr	Great Britain							56.06		2
8	Isabelle Devaluez	France							53.56		1

=== Javelin throw ===
27 June – Old model

Rank	Name	Nationality	#1	#2	#3	#4	#5	#6	Result	Notes	Points
1	Petra Felke	East Germany	66.76	61.82	70.20	63.78	71.26	63.72	71.26		8
2	Natalya Yermolovich	Soviet Union	x	x	64.42	x	x	x	64.42		7
3	Beate Peters	West Germany	61.26	55.98	x	62.94	62.96	64.38	64.38		6
4	Galiya Nikolova	Bulgaria							62.22		5
5	Elena Burgárová	Czechoslovakia							60.00		4
6	Julie Abel	Great Britain							57.46		3
7	Maria Jabłońska	Poland							57.18		2
8	Evelyne Giardino	France							55.96		1
