= 1982 European Athletics Championships – Women's 800 metres =

Women's 800 metres at the European Athletics Championships

These are the official results of the Women's 800 metres event at the 1982 European Championships in Athens, Greece, held at Olympic Stadium "Spiros Louis" on 6, 7, and 8 September 1982.

== Medalists ==
Gold	Olga Mineyeva; Soviet Union
Silver	Lyudmila Veselkova; Soviet Union
Bronze	Margrit Klinger; West Germany

== Results ==
=== Final ===
8 September

Rank	Name	Nationality	Time	Notes
1st place, gold medalist(s)	Olga Mineyeva	Soviet Union	1:55.41	CR
2nd place, silver medalist(s)	Lyudmila Veselkova	Soviet Union	1:55.96	
3rd place, bronze medalist(s)	Margrit Klinger	West Germany	1:57.22	
4	Jolanta Januchta	Poland	1:57.92	
5	Hildegard Ullrich	East Germany	1:58.19	
6	Doina Melinte	Romania	1:59.65	
7	Nikolina Shtereva	Bulgaria	2:01.77	
8	Wanda Stefańska	Poland	2:03.05	

=== Semi-finals ===
7 September

==== Semi-final 1 ====
Rank	Name	Nationality	Time	Notes
1	Hildegard Ullrich	East Germany	2:02.44	Q
2	Jolanta Januchta	Poland	2:02.50	Q
3	Olga Mineyeva	Soviet Union	2:02.65	Q
4	Doina Melinte	Romania	2:02.71	Q
5	Ravilya Agletdinova	Soviet Union	2:02.82	
6	Vanya Gospodinova	Bulgaria	2:03.45	
7	Totka Petrova	Bulgaria	2:03.53	
8	Jill McCabe	Sweden	2:05.43	

==== Semi-final 2 ====
Rank	Name	Nationality	Time	Notes
1	Lyudmila Veselkova	Soviet Union	1:59.00	Q
2	Margrit Klinger	West Germany	1:59.05	Q
3	Nikolina Shtereva	Bulgaria	1:59.28	Q
4	Wanda Stefańska	Poland	1:59.87	Q
5	Anne Clarkson	United Kingdom	2:00.34	
6	Zuzana Moravčíková	Czechoslovakia	2:02.48	
7	Elly van Hulst	Netherlands	2:02.62	
8	Rosine Wallez	Belgium	2:03.70	

=== Heats ===
6 September

==== Heat 1 ====
Rank	Name	Nationality	Time	Notes
1	Doina Melinte	Romania	2:00.87	Q
2	Lyudmila Veselkova	Soviet Union	2:00.92	Q
3	Wanda Stefańska	Poland	2:01.13	Q
4	Nikolina Shtereva	Bulgaria	2:01.36	Q
5	Rosine Wallez	Belgium	2:02.07	Q
6	Randi Bjørn	Norway	2:04.20	

==== Heat 2 ====
Rank	Name	Nationality	Time	Notes
1	Margrit Klinger	West Germany	2:01.43	Q
2	Ravilya Agletdinova	Soviet Union	2:01.59	Q
3	Anne Clarkson	United Kingdom	2:01.59	Q
4	Vanya Gospodinova	Bulgaria	2:02.00	Q
5	Zuzana Moravčíková	Czechoslovakia	2:03.15	Q
6	Jill McCabe	Sweden	2:03.98	q
7	Bernadette Louis	France	2:05.76	

==== Heat 3 ====
Rank	Name	Nationality	Time	Notes
1	Hildegard Ullrich	East Germany	2:01.24	Q
2	Olga Mineyeva	Soviet Union	2:01.29	Q
3	Totka Petrova	Bulgaria	2:01.50	Q
4	Jolanta Januchta	Poland	2:01.66	Q
5	Elly van Hulst	Netherlands	2:02.37	Q
6	Nathalie Thoumas	France	2:04.99	
7	Georgia Troubouki	Greece	2:10.15	

== Participation ==
According to an unofficial count, 20 athletes from 14 countries participated in the event.

- Belgium (1)
- Bulgaria (3)
- Czechoslovakia (1)
- East Germany (1)
- France (2)
- Greece (1)
- Netherlands (1)
- Norway (1)
- Poland (2)
- Romania (1)
- Soviet Union (3)
- Sweden (1)
- United Kingdom (1)
- West Germany (1)

== See also ==
- 1978 Women's European Championships 800 metres (Prague)
- 1980 Women's Olympic 800 metres (Moscow)
- 1983 Women's World Championships 800 metres (Helsinki)
- 1984 Women's Olympic 800 metres (Los Angeles)
- 1986 Women's European Championships 800 metres (Stuttgart)
- 1987 Women's World Championships 800 metres (Rome)
- 1988 Women's Olympic 800 metres (Seoul)
