= Athletics at the 1984 Summer Olympics – Women's 800 metres =

Women's 800 metres at the Games of the XXIII Olympiad
- Venue: Los Angeles Memorial Coliseum
- Date: 3 August 1984 (heats); 4 August 1984 (semi-finals); 6 August 1984 (final)
- Competitors: 25 from 20 nations
- Winning time: 1:57.60

Medalists
1st place, gold medalist(s)		Doina Melinte; Romania
2nd place, silver medalist(s)		Kim Gallagher; United States
3rd place, bronze medalist(s)		Fiţa Lovin; Romania

Video on YouTube Official Video

These are the official results of the Women's 800 metres event at the 1984 Summer Olympics in Los Angeles, California, United States. The final was held on August 6, 1984.

== Medalists ==
Gold	Doina Melinte; Romania
Silver	Kim Gallagher; United States
Bronze	Fiţa Lovin; Romania

== Records ==
These were the standing world and Olympic records (in minutes) prior to the 1984 Summer Olympics.

World record	1:53.28	(Czechoslovakia) Jarmila Kratochvílová	Munich (FRG)	July 26, 1983
Olympic record	1:53.43	(Soviet Union) Nadiya Olizarenko	Moscow (URS)	July 27, 1980

== Final ==
Held on August 6, 1984

Rank	Athlete	Nation	Time	Notes
Gold medal	Doina Melinte	Romania	1:57.60	
Silver medal	Kim Gallagher	United States	1:58.63	
Bronze medal	Fiţa Lovin	Romania	1:58.83	
4	Gabriella Dorio	Italy	1:59.05	
5	Lorraine Baker	Great Britain	2:00.03	
6	Ruth Wysocki	United States	2:00.34	
7	Margrit Klinger	West Germany	2:00.65	
8	Caroline O'Shea	Ireland	2:00.77	

== Semifinals ==
- Held on August 4, 1984

Rank	Athlete	Nation	Time	Notes
1	Kim Gallagher	United States	2:00.48	
2	Doina Melinte	Romania	2:01.42	
3	Ruth Wysocki	United States	2:02.31	
4	Caroline O'Shea	Ireland	2:02.70	
5	Elly van Hulst	Netherlands	2:03.25	
6	Angelita Lind	Puerto Rico	2:03.27	
7	Christine Slythe	Canada	2:04.95	
8	Ranza Clark	Canada	2:05.42	

Rank	Athlete	Nation	Time	Notes
1	Fiţa Lovin	Romania	1:59.29	
2	Gabriella Dorio	Italy	1:59.53	
3	Margrit Klinger	West Germany	2:00.00	
4	Lorraine Baker	Great Britain	2:00.66	
5	Robin Campbell	United States	2:01.21	
6	Jill McCabe	Sweden	2:02.20	
7	Grace Verbeek	Canada	2:03.23	
8	Shiny Abraham	India	2:05.42	

== Round one ==
- Held on August 3, 1984

Rank	Athlete	Nation	Time	Notes
1	Margrit Klinger	West Germany	2:03.66	
2	Ruth Wysocki	United States	2:04.05	
3	Jill McCabe	Sweden	2:04.16	
4	Ranza Clark	Canada	2:04.67	
5	Céléstine N'Drin	Ivory Coast	2:06.06	
6	Christine Bakombo	Zaire	2:18.79	

Rank	Athlete	Nation	Time	Notes
1	Fiţa Lovin	Romania	2:01.51	
2	Robin Campbell	United States	2:01.72	
3	Lorraine Baker	Great Britain	2:01.73	
4	Angelita Lind	Puerto Rico	2:01.84	
5	Selina Chirchir	Kenya	2:07.17	
6	Grace Bakari	Ghana	2:14.50	

Rank	Athlete	Nation	Time	Notes
1	Doina Melinte	Romania	2:02.77	
2	Caroline O'Shea	Ireland	2:03.60	
3	Christine Slythe	Canada	2:04.17	
4	Shiny Abraham	India	2:04.69	
5	Alejandra Ramos	Chile	2:05.77	
6	Evelyn Adiru	Uganda	2:07.39	
7	Zonia Meigham	Guatemala	2:14.17	

Rank	Athlete	Nation	Time	Notes
1	Kim Gallagher	United States	2:00.37	
2	Gabriella Dorio	Italy	2:01.41	
3	Elly van Hulst	Netherlands	2:03.38	
4	Grace Verbeek	Canada	2:04.16	
5	Albertina Machado	Portugal	2:05.74	
6	Laverne Bryan	Antigua and Barbuda	2:11.44	

== See also ==
- 1982 Women's European Championships 800 metres (Athens)
- 1983 Women's World Championships 800 metres (Helsinki)
- 1984 Women's Friendship Games 800 metres (Prague)
- 1987 Women's World Championships 800 metres (Rome)
