= Athletics at the Friendship Games – Women's 800 metres =

The women's 800 metres event at the Friendship Games was held on 17 August 1984 at the Evžen Rošický Stadium in Prague, Czechoslovakia.

== Results ==
Rank	Heat	Name	Nationality	Time	Notes
1st place, gold medalist(s)	2	Irina Podyalovskaya	Soviet Union	1:57.31	
2nd place, silver medalist(s)	2	Zuzana Moravčíková	Czechoslovakia	1:58.06	
3rd place, bronze medalist(s)	2	Nadiya Olizarenko	Soviet Union	1:58.10	
4	2	Lyubov Gurina	Soviet Union	1:58.13	
5	2	Hildegard Ullrich	East Germany	1:58.50	
6	2	Katrin Wühn	East Germany	1:59.08	
7	2	Yanka Dimova	Bulgaria	2:00.75	
8	1	Shireen Bailey	Great Britain	2:01.47	
9	1	Vanya Stoyanova	Bulgaria	2:01.83	
10	2	Jolanta Januchta	Poland	2:02.49	
11	1	Nery McKeen	Cuba	2:02.74	
12	1	Sandra Gasser	Switzerland	2:03.38	
13	1	Ivana Hlaváčková	Czechoslovakia	2:05.72	
14	1	Alice Silva	Portugal	2:10.37	
15	1	Sophalnera	Cambodia	2:37.80	

== See also ==
- Athletics at the 1984 Summer Olympics – Women's 800 metres
