= Athletics at the 1975 Summer Universiade – Women's shot put =

The women's shot put event at the 1975 Summer Universiade was held at the Stadio Olimpico in Rome on 18 September.

== Results ==
Rank	Athlete	Nationality	Result	Notes
1st place, gold medalist(s)	Elena Stoyanova	Bulgaria	18.99	
2nd place, silver medalist(s)	Mihaela Loghin	Romania	18.21	
3rd place, bronze medalist(s)	Rima Makauskaitė	Soviet Union	18.06	
4	Ludwika Chewińska	Poland	17.73	
5	Radostina Bakhchevanova	Bulgaria	17.27	
6	Léone Bertimon	France	15.50	
7	Ritva Metso	Finland	15.14	
8	Helga Jaxt	West Germany	14.46	
9	Ilaria Nistri	Italy	12.56	
10	Guadalupe Lartigue	Mexico	11.90	
