= Athletics at the 1957 World University Games – Women's shot put =

The women's shot put event at the 1957 World University Games was held at the Stadium Charlety in Paris on 7 September 1957.

== Results ==
| Rank | Name | Nationality | #1 | #2 | #3 | #4 | #5 | #6 | Result | Notes |
|---|---|---|---|---|---|---|---|---|---|---|
| 1st place, gold medalist(s) | Galina Zybina | Soviet Union | 15.53 | 15.67 | 15.55 | x | 15.48 | 15.75 | 15.75 | |
| 2nd place, silver medalist(s) | Earlene Brown | United States | 12.87 | 13.09 | 14.00 | 13.41 | 14.43 | 13.98 | 14.43 | |
| 3rd place, bronze medalist(s) | Milena Usenik | Yugoslavia | 13.82 | 14.02 | 13.05 | 13.28 | 13.64 | 13.25 | 14.02 | |
| 4 | Hannelore Klute | West Germany | 13.87 | 13.70 | 13.47 | 13.75 | 13.68 | x | 13.87 | |
| 5 | Antonia Vehoff | West Germany | 13.62 | 13.32 | 13.20 | 13.49 | 13.51 | 13.48 | 13.62 | |
| 6 | Lidiya Sharamovich | Bulgaria | 13.43 | 13.49 | 12.93 | 12.75 | 13.20 | 13.27 | 13.49 | |
| 7 | Marthe Bretelle | France | | | | | | | 13.23 | |
| 8 | Almut Brömmel | West Germany | | | | | | | 12.94 | |
| 9 | Elivia Ricci | Italy | | | | | | | 10.43 | |
