= Athletics at the 1965 Summer Universiade – Women's high jump =

The women's high jump event at the 1965 Summer Universiade was held at the People's Stadium in Budapest on 26 August 1965.

== Results ==
Rank	Name	Nationality	Result	Notes
1st place, gold medalist(s)	Yordanka Blagoeva	Bulgaria	1.65	
2nd place, silver medalist(s)	Klara Pushkaryeva	Soviet Union	1.65	
3rd place, bronze medalist(s)	Nevenka Mrinjek	Yugoslavia	1.63	
4	Mária Faithová	Czechoslovakia	1.59	
5	Geneviève Laureau	France	1.56	
6	Susan Dennler	Great Britain	1.56	
7	Mami Takeda	Japan	1.56	
8	Liliane de Loynes	France	1.56	
9	Milena Hudcová	Czechoslovakia	1.56	
10	Anna Noszály	Hungary	1.56	
11	Elke Bucher	West Germany	1.50	
12	Angelika Müller	West Germany	1.50	
13	Barbara Sowa	Poland	1.50	
14	Rodica Crisan	Romania	1.45	
15	Liesel Sykora	Austria	1.45	
16	Emilia Hejna	Poland	1.45	
