= 1966 European Indoor Games – Women's high jump =

The women's high jump event at the 1966 European Indoor Games was held on 27 March in Dortmund.

== Results ==
Rank	Name	Nationality	Result	Notes
1st place, gold medalist(s)	Iolanda Balaș	Romania	1.76	
2nd place, silver medalist(s)	Olga Gere-Pulić	Yugoslavia	1.73	
3rd place, bronze medalist(s)	Ilia Hans	West Germany	1.65	
4	Mary Rand	Great Britain	1.65	
5	Geneviève Laureau	France	1.65	
6	Nevenka Mrinjek	Yugoslavia	1.65	
7	Marjan Thomas	Netherlands	1.60	
8	Mária Faithová	Czechoslovakia	1.60	
