= 1984 European Athletics Indoor Championships – Women's 800 metres =

The women's 800 metres event at the 1984 European Athletics Indoor Championships was held on 3 and 4 March.

== Medalists ==
Gold	Silver	Bronze
Milena Matějkovičová; Czechoslovakia	Doina Melinte; Romania	Cristieana Cojocaru; Romania

== Results ==
=== Heats ===
First 2 from each heat (Q) and the next 2 fastest (q) qualified for the final.

Rank	Heat	Name	Nationality	Time	Notes
1	2	Milena Matějkovičová	Czechoslovakia	2:04.61	Q
2	2	Cristieana Cojocaru	Romania	2:04.71	Q
3	2	Petra Kleinbrahm	West Germany	2:04.83	q
4	2	Jill McCabe	Sweden	2:05.09	q
5	1	Doina Melinte	Romania	2:06.10	Q
6	1	Zuzana Moravčíková	Czechoslovakia	2:06.41	Q
7	1	Lyudmila Borisova	Soviet Union	2:06.71	
8	1	Martina van Dam	West Germany	2:07.20	

=== Final ===
Rank	Name	Nationality	Time	Notes
1st place, gold medalist(s)	Milena Matějkovičová	Czechoslovakia	1:59.52	CR
2nd place, silver medalist(s)	Doina Melinte	Romania	1:59.81	
3rd place, bronze medalist(s)	Cristieana Cojocaru	Romania	2:01.24	
4	Jill McCabe	Sweden	2:02.88	
5	Petra Kleinbrahm	West Germany	2:03.46	
6	Zuzana Moravčíková	Czechoslovakia	2:03.72	
