= 1999 European Athletics U23 Championships – Women's javelin throw =

The women's javelin throw event at the 1999 European Athletics U23 Championships was held in Gothenburg, Sweden, at Ullevi on 29 July and 1 August 1999.

== Medalists ==
Gold	Susan Mathies; Germany
Silver	Tetyana Lyakhovych; Ukraine
Bronze	Veera Oksanen; Finland

== Results ==
=== Final ===
1 August

Rank	Name	Nationality	Attempts						Result	Notes
Rank	Name	Nationality	1	2	3	4	5	6	Result	Notes
1st place, gold medalist(s)	Susan Mathies	Germany	55.03	56.52	57.64	53.44	54.16	56.51	57.64	CR
2nd place, silver medalist(s)	Tetyana Lyakhovych	Ukraine	52.44	57.35	53.44	47.21	53.35	50.72	57.35	
3rd place, bronze medalist(s)	Veera Oksanen	Finland	54.14	x	x	x	x	55.90	55.90	
4	Dana Lehmann	Germany	54.92	53.33	54.36	50.93	x	54.90	54.92	
5	Sarah Walter	France	52.72	x	49.19	49.29	54.20	53.65	54.20	
6	Zahra Bani	Italy	51.90	x	x	48.96	49.81	x	51.90	
7	Jana Woytkowska	Germany	51.59	x	x	x	x	x	51.59	
8	Moonika Aava	Estonia	50.23	x	49.04	x	x	48.76	50.23	
9	Lyudmila Gamanyuk	Ukraine	47.79	49.93	48.79				49.93	
10	Michaela Jačková	Czech Republic	45.83	45.41	49.92				49.92	
11	Liza Randjelovič	Slovenia	x	47.47	x				47.47	
12	Tiziana Rocco	Italy	x	38.16	x				38.16	

== Participation ==
According to an unofficial count, 12 athletes from 8 countries participated in the event.

- Czech Republic (1)
- Estonia (1)
- Finland (1)
- France (1)
- Germany (3)
- Italy (2)
- Slovenia (1)
- Ukraine (2)
