= Caroline O'Shea =

Caroline O'Shea may refer to:

- Caroline O'Shea (Big Brother), a contestant on the TV show Big Brother
- Caroline O'Shea (athlete) (born 1960), Irish middle-distance runner
