= Milena Strnadová =

Czech former track and field athlete (born 1961)

Medal record

Women's athletics

Representing Czechoslovakia

World Championships
Silver medal – second place	1983 Helsinki	4 × 400 m relay

European Championships
Silver medal – second place	1982 Athens	4 × 400 m relay

European Indoor Championships
Gold medal – first place	1984 Gothenburg	800 m

Milena Strnadová (née Matejkovicová; born 23 May 1961 in Ústí nad Labem) is a Czech former track and field athlete who competed for Czechoslovakia in the 400 metres and 800 metres events.

She enjoyed international success in her early twenties with silver medal wins behind East German opposition as part of the Czechoslovak women's 4 × 400 metres relay team, first at the 1982 European Athletics Championships (alongside Věra Tylová, Taťána Kocembová and Jarmila Kratochvílová) and then at the 1983 World Championships in Athletics (where Zuzana Moravčíková replaced Tylová). At the latter event the team set a Czechoslovak national record of 3:20.32 minutes, which still stands as the Czech record.

Competing individually, Strnadová reached two major outdoor finals in the 800 m, placing seventh at the 1983 World Championships and fifth at the 1986 European Athletics Championships. Her greatest individual achievement was at the 1984 European Athletics Indoor Championships, where she won a gold medal in the 800 m with a championship record time of 1:59.52 minutes. This remained as the record for 18 years before being bettered by Slovenia's Jolanda Čeplak in 2002. She was runner-up to her world record-breaking compatriot Kratochvílová at the 1985 IAAF Grand Prix Final, and won full points for her country at the European Cup B Final in 1991. Her last international appearances were as semi-finalist at the 1991 World Championships in Athletics and 1992 European Athletics Indoor Championships.

She was a four-time national champion covering three disciplines, winning the 800 m (twice) and 400 m at the national indoor championships and having her sole outdoor title over 1500 metres in 1989.

== Personal bests ==
- 400 metres – 51.88 (1983)
- 800 metres – 1:57.28 (1983)

== International competitions ==
Year	Competition	Venue	Position	Event	Notes
1982	European Championships	Athens, Greece	2nd	4 × 400 m relay	3:22.17
1983	World Championships	Helsinki, Finland	2nd	4 × 400 m relay	3:20.32 NR
1983	World Championships	Helsinki, Finland	7th	800 m	2:01.72
1984	European Indoor Championships	Gothenburg, Sweden	1st	800 m	1:59.52 CR
1985	IAAF Grand Prix Final	Rome, Italy	2nd	800 m	2:00.09
1986	European Championships	Stuttgart, West Germany	5th	800 m	1:58.89
1986	Goodwill Games	Moscow, Soviet Union	4th	800 m	1:57.90
1991	European Cup B-final	Barcelona, Spain	1st	800 m	2:01.48
1991	World Championships	Tokyo, Japan	5th (semis)	800 m	2:00.47
1992	European Indoor Championships	Genoa, Italy	5th (semis)	800 m	2:04.16

== National titles ==
- Czechoslovak Athletics Championships
  - 1500 m: 1989
- Czechoslovak Indoor Athletics Championships
  - 400 m: 1992
  - 800 m: 1986, 1991

== See also ==
- List of World Championships in Athletics medalists (women)
- List of European Athletics Championships medalists (women)
