= Lyudmila Veselkova =

Personal information
- Born: 25 October 1950 (age 75)
Medal record
Women's athletics
Representing the Soviet Union
European Championships
Silver medal – second place	1982 Athens	800 m
IAAF World Cup
Gold medal – first place	1981 Rome	800 metres

Lyudmila Veselkova (Russian: Людмила Павловна Веселкова), née Lyudmila Semeniuta, (25 October 1950) is a retired female middle-distance runner, who represented the USSR in the 1970s and the early 1980s. She set her personal best in the women's 800 metres (1:55.96) on 8 September 1982 at the European Championships in Athens, Greece.

Records
Preceded by Mary Decker	Women's mile world record holder 12 September 1981 – 9 July 1982	Succeeded by Mary Decker-Tabb
