= 1983 European Athletics Indoor Championships – Women's 800 metres =

The women's 800 metres event at the 1983 European Athletics Indoor Championships was held on 5 and 6 March.

== Medalists ==
Gold	Silver	Bronze
Svetlana Kitova; Soviet Union	Zuzana Moravčíková; Czechoslovakia	Olga Simakova; Soviet Union

== Results ==
=== Heats ===
First 2 from each heat (Q) and the next 2 fastest (q) qualified for the final.

Rank	Heat	Name	Nationality	Time	Notes
1	1	Svetlana Kitova	Soviet Union	2:02.93	Q
2	1	Ines Vogelgesang	East Germany	2:03.25	Q
3	2	Olga Simanova	Soviet Union	2:03.31	Q
4	2	Jane Finch	Great Britain	2:03.32	Q
5	2	Zuzana Moravčíková	Czechoslovakia	2:03.33	q
6	2	Doina Melinte	Romania	2:03.33	q
7	1	Teena Colebrook	Great Britain	2:03.89	
	1	Jarmila Kratochvílová	Czechoslovakia	DNS	
	1	Anne-Marie Van Nuffel	Belgium	DNS	

=== Final ===
Rank	Name	Nationality	Time	Notes
1st place, gold medalist(s)	Svetlana Kitova	Soviet Union	2:01.28	
2nd place, silver medalist(s)	Zuzana Moravčíková	Czechoslovakia	2:01.66	
3rd place, bronze medalist(s)	Olga Simanova	Soviet Union	2:02.25	
4	Doina Melinte	Romania	2:02.70	
5	Ines Vogelgesang	East Germany	2:03.11	
6	Jane Finch	Great Britain	2:03.21	
