= Antje Schröder =

German athletics competitor (born 1963)

Antje Schröder (born 2 September 1963) is a German female former track and field athlete who competed in the 800 metres. She holds a personal best of 1:57.57 minutes, set in Leipzig in 1983. That same year she was the silver medallist in the 1983 European Cup behind Jarmila Kratochvílová and was a finalist at the inaugural 1983 World Championships in Athletics.

She competed for SC Chemie Halle during her career and was the 800 m runner-up at both the indoor and outdoor national championships in 1983.

== International competitions ==
Year	Competition	Venue	Position	Event	Notes
1983	European Cup	London, United Kingdom	2nd	800 m	1:59.53
1983	World Championships	Helsinki, Finland	8th	800 m	2:02.13
