= 1981 European Athletics Indoor Championships – Women's 800 metres =

The women's 800 metres event at the 1981 European Athletics Indoor Championships was held on 21 and 22 February.

== Medalists ==
Gold	Silver	Bronze
Hildegard Ullrich; East Germany	Svetla Koleva; Bulgaria	Nikolina Shtereva; Bulgaria

== Results ==
=== Heats ===
First 2 from each heat (Q) and the next 2 fastest (q) qualified for the semifinals.

Rank	Heat	Name	Nationality	Time	Notes
1	1	Svetla Koleva	Bulgaria	2:02.65	Q
2	1	Nikolina Shtereva	Bulgaria	2:02.76	Q
3	1	Anne-Marie Van Nuffel	Belgium	2:03.41	q
4	2	Hildegard Ullrich	East Germany	2:03.90	Q
5	1	Kirsty Wade	Great Britain	2:04.15	q
6	2	Montserrat Pujol	Spain	2:04.50	Q
7	1	Bernadette Louis	France	2:04.89	
8	2	Betty Van Steenbroeck	Belgium	2:05.27	
9	2	Kirsti Voldnes	Norway	2:06.05	
10	2	Violeta Tsvetkova	Bulgaria	2:10.56	

=== Final ===
Rank	Name	Nationality	Time	Notes
1st place, gold medalist(s)	Hildegard Ullrich	East Germany	2:00.94	
2nd place, silver medalist(s)	Svetla Koleva	Bulgaria	2:01.37	
3rd place, bronze medalist(s)	Nikolina Shtereva	Bulgaria	2:02.50	
4	Kirsty Wade	Great Britain	2:02.88	
5	Anne-Marie Van Nuffel	Belgium	2:05.37	
6	Montserrat Pujol	Spain	2:06.13	
