= Grace Verbeek =

Canadian middle-distance runner

Personal information
- Nationality: Canadian
- Born: 10 August 1958 (age 67) Hamilton, Ontario, Canada

Sport
- Sport: Middle-distance running
- Event: 800 metres

Grace Verbeek (born 10 August 1958) is a Canadian middle-distance runner. She competed in the women's 800 metres at the 1984 Summer Olympics.
