= Michèle Lurot =

Personal information
- Born: 15 April 1943 (age 83) Malakoff, France
- Height: 1.61 m (5 ft 3 in)
- Weight: 53 kg (117 lb)

Sport
- Sport: Sprint running
- Club: USM Malakoff

Michèle Lurot (née Davaze on 23 April 1940) is a retired French sprinter. She competed in the 200 m and 4 × 100 m relay events at the 1964 Summer Olympics, and finished in eights place in the relay. Her personal bests are 11.9 s in the 100 m (1962) and 24.3 s in the 200 m (1964).

Her husband Maurice also competed in sprint running at the 1964 Games.
