= Zuzana Moravčíková (runner) =

Slovak track and field athlete (born 1956)

Medal record

Women's athletics

Representing Czechoslovakia

World Championships
| Silver medal – second place | 1983 Helsinki | 4 × 400 m relay |

European Indoor Championships
| Silver medal – second place | 1983 Budapest | 800 m |

Zuzana Moravčíková (born 30 December 1956) is a female Slovak former track and field athlete who competed in sprint and middle-distance events. She was a silver medallist at the European Athletics Indoor Championships in 1983 and won a global silver in national record time (3:20.32 minutes) with Czechoslovakia's women's 4 × 400 metres relay team at the 1983 World Championships in Athletics, alongside Tatána Kocembová, Milena Matějkovičová and Jarmila Kratochvílová. She was a double silver medallist at the 1984 Friendship Games, at which Olympic-boycotting nations competed.

Born in Nitra, Moravčíková trained under coach Milan Bureš, alongside fellow national runner Matějkovičová. She was a three-time national champion in the 800 m, winning the outdoor title in 1980 and indoor titles in 1982 and 1985. She held personal bests of 52.39 seconds for the 400 metres and 1:56.96 minutes for the 800 metres, both set in 1983.

== International competitions ==
| Year | Competition | Venue | Position | Event | Notes |
|---|---|---|---|---|---|
| 1982 | European Indoor Championships | Milan, Italy | 9th (heats) | 800 m | 2:05.66 |
| 1982 | European Championships | Athens, Greece | 6th (semis) | 800 m | 2:02.48 |
| 1983 | European Indoor Championships | Budapest, Hungary | 2nd | 800 m | 2:01.66 |
| 1983 | World Championships in Athletics | Helsinki, Finland | 5th (semis) | 800 m | 1:59.96 |
| 1983 | World Championships in Athletics | Helsinki, Finland | 2nd | 4 × 400 m relay | 3:20.32 NR |
| 1984 | European Indoor Championships | Gothenburg, Sweden | 6th | 800 m | 2:03.72 |
| 1984 | Friendship Games | Prague, Czechoslovakia | 2nd | 800 m | 1:58.06 |
| 1984 | Friendship Games | Prague, Czechoslovakia | 2nd | 4 × 400 m relay | 3:21.89 |
| 1985 | European Indoor Championships | Piraeus, Greece | — | 800 m | DNS |

== National titles ==
- Czechoslovak Athletics Championships
  - 800 m: 1980
- Czechoslovak Indoor Athletics Championships
  - 800 m: 1982, 1985

== See also ==
- List of World Championships in Athletics medalists (women)
- List of European Athletics Indoor Championships medalists (women)
