= Trịnh Thị Bé =

Vietnamese middle-distance runner

Personal information
- Nationality: Vietnamese
- Born: 3 September 1955 (age 70)

Sport
- Sport: Middle-distance running
- Event: 1500 metres

Trịnh Thị Bé (born 3 September 1955) is a Vietnamese middle-distance runner. She competed in the women's 1500 metres at the 1980 Summer Olympics.

Trinh is from the Ý Yên district of the Nam Định province and ran representing the Vietnam People's Public Security. She specialized in distances 800 m to 3000 m. She won her first Vietnamese Athletics Championships medal in 1976 over 1500 m.

At the 1980 Olympics, Trinh finished 11th in her 1500 m semi-final and did not advance to the finals. She qualified for her first world championship at the 1983 World Championships in Athletics, where she finished 6th in her 800 m heat and did not advance.

From 1981 to 1986, Trinh won five consecutive Vietnamese Championships national titles. After retirement, in 1996 she began to coach the Vietnam People's Public Security team.
