= 1983 World Championships in Athletics – Women's 800 metres =

These are the official results of the Women's 800 metres event at the 1983 IAAF World Championships in Helsinki, Finland. There were a total number of 27 participating athletes, with four qualifying heats, two semi-finals and the final held on Tuesday 9 August 1983.

== Medalists ==
Gold	Jarmila Kratochvílová; Czechoslovakia (TCH)
Silver	Lyubov Gurina; Soviet Union (URS)
Bronze	Yekaterina Podkopayeva; Soviet Union (URS)

== Records ==
Existing records at the start of the event.

World record	Jarmila Kratochvílová (TCH)	1:53.28	Munich, West Germany	July 26, 1983
Championship record	New event			

== Final ==
RANK	FINAL	TIME
1st place, gold medalist(s)	Jarmila Kratochvílová (TCH)	1:54.68
2nd place, silver medalist(s)	Lyubov Gurina (URS)	1:56.11
3rd place, bronze medalist(s)	Yekaterina Podkopayeva (URS)	1:57.58
4.	Margrit Klinger (FRG)	1:58.11
5.	Robin Campbell (USA)	2:00.03
6.	Doina Melinte (ROU)	2:00.13
7.	Milena Matejkovičová (TCH)	2:01.72
8.	Antje Schröder (GDR)	2:02.13

== Semi-finals ==
- Held on Monday 8 August 1983

RANK	HEAT 1	TIME
1.	Yekaterina Podkopayeva (URS)	1:59.55
2.	Jarmila Kratochvílová (TCH)	1:59.58
3.	Milena Matejkovičová (TCH)	2:00.02
4.	Robin Campbell (USA)	2:00.22
5.	Jolanta Januchta (POL)	2:02.23
6.	Jill McCabe (SWE)	2:02.92
7.	Elena Lina (ROU)	2:03.59
8.	Célestine N'Drin (CIV)	2:08.14

RANK	HEAT 2	TIME
1.	Lyubov Gurina (URS)	1:59.33
2.	Antje Schröder (GDR)	1:59.46
3.	Margrit Klinger (FRG)	1:59.49
4.	Doina Melinte (ROU)	1:59.60
5.	Zuzana Moravčíková (TCH)	1:59.96
6.	Totka Petrova (BUL)	2:01.32
7.	Tina Krebs (DEN)	2:02.19
8.	Jennifer Bean (BER)	2:12.93

== Qualifying heats ==
- Held on Sunday 7 August 1983

RANK	HEAT 1	TIME
1.	Margrit Klinger (FRG)	2:02.08
2.	Jolanta Januchta (POL)	2:02.58
3.	Milena Matejkovičová (TCH)	2:02.60
4.	Elena Lina (ROU)	2:04.50
5.	Attina Sawtell (COK)	2:18.25
6.	Kungu Bakombo (ZAI)	2:19.68

RANK	HEAT 2	TIME
1.	Yekaterina Podkopayeva (URS)	2:06.42
2.	Totka Petrova (BUL)	2:06.60
3.	Zuzana Moravčíková (TCH)	2:06.76
4.	Jill McCabe (SWE)	2:07.23
5.	Maria Lomba (STP)	2:21.90
—	Fatalmoudou Touré (MLI)	DQ

RANK	HEAT 3	TIME
1.	Antje Schröder (GDR)	2:10.61
2.	Jarmila Kratochvílová (TCH)	2:12.35
3.	Célestine N'Drin (CIV)	2:12.52
4.	Hala El-Moughrabi (SYR)	2:15.37
5.	Eucaris Caicedo (COL)	2:17.06
6.	Sofiya Mohamed (COM)	2:55.64
—	Irina Podyalovskaya (URS)	DNS

RANK	HEAT 4	TIME
1.	Lyubov Gurina (URS)	2:04.17
2.	Doina Melinte (ROU)	2:04.30
3.	Robin Campbell (USA)	2:04.83
4.	Tina Krebs (DEN)	2:05.49
5.	Jennifer Bean (BER)	2:13.80
6.	Trịnh Thị Bé (VIE)	2:17.54
7.	Khadija Al Matari (JOR)	2:28.72
