= Athletics at the Friendship Games – Women's 4 × 400 metres relay =

The women's 4 × 400 metres relay event at the Friendship Games was held on 18 August 1984 at the Evžen Rošický Stadium in Prague, Czechoslovakia.

== Results ==
Rank	Nation	Competitors	Time	Notes
1st place, gold medalist(s)	Soviet Union	Irina Baskakova, Irina Nazarova, Mariya Pinigina, Olga Bryzgina	3:19.22	
2nd place, silver medalist(s)	Czechoslovakia	Alena Bulířová, Zuzana Moravčíková, Jarmila Kratochvílová, Taťána Kocembová	3:21.89	
3rd place, bronze medalist(s)	Bulgaria	Galina Penkova, Katia Ilieva, Radostina Shtereva, Rositsa Stamenova	3:28.34	
4	Poland	Elżbieta Kapusta, Małgorzata Dunecka, Jolanta Januchta, Genowefa Błaszak	3:29.09	

== See also ==
- Athletics at the 1984 Summer Olympics – Women's 4 × 400 metres relay
