= Yann David =

France international rugby union player (born 1988)

Yannick David
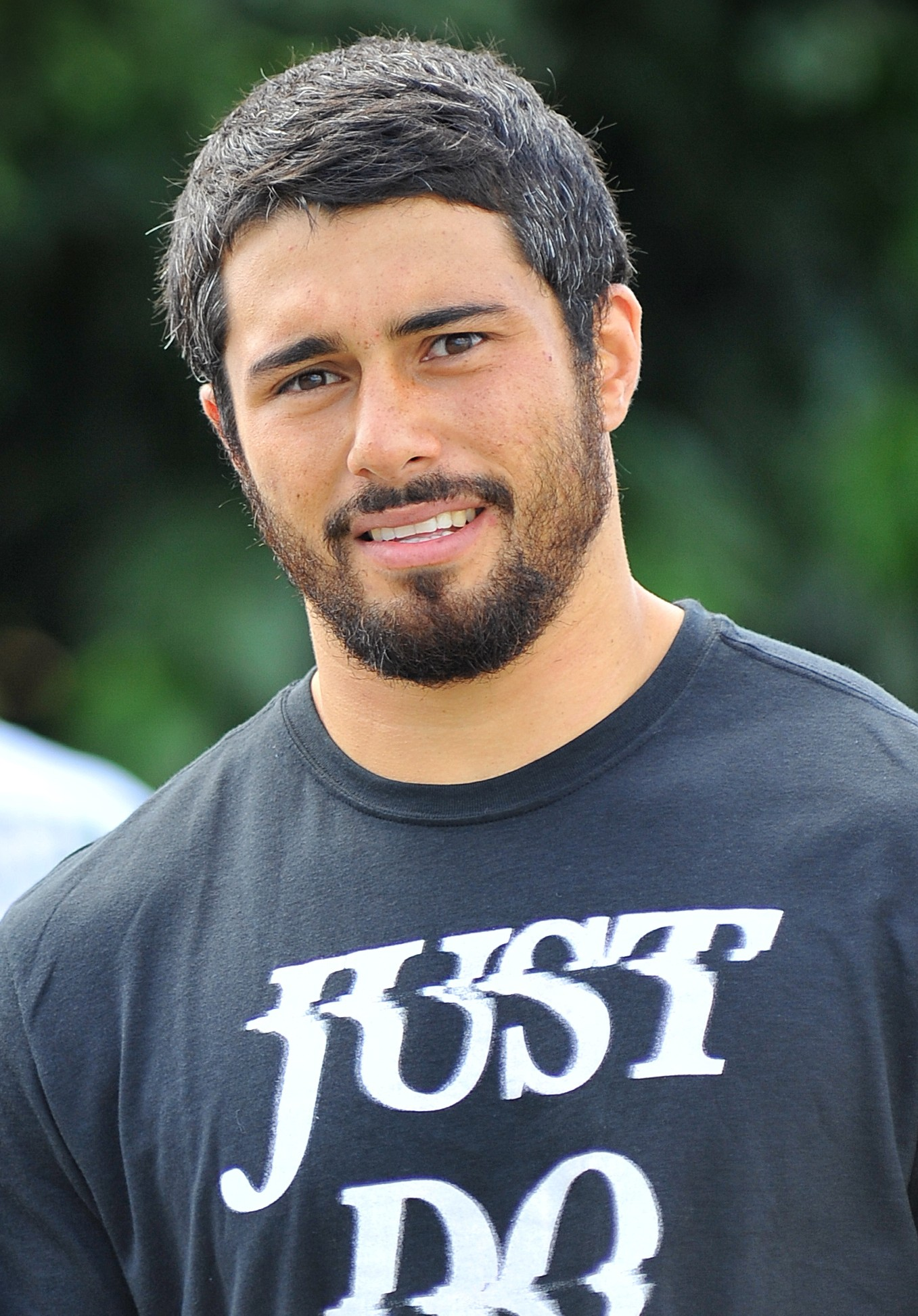
- Born: 15 April 1988 (age 38) Lyon, France
- Height: 1.85 m (6 ft 1 in)
- Weight: 105 kg (231 lb)

Rugby union career
- Position(s): Centre, wing
Senior career
Years	Team	Apps	(Points)
2007–2009	Bourgoin	45	(30)
2009–2018	Toulouse	162	(75)
2018-2021	Castres	18	(5)
2021–	Bayonne		
- Correct as of 9 December 2019
International career
Years	Team	Apps	(Points)
2008–2009	France	4	(0)

Yann David (born 15 April 1988 in Lyon, France) is a French professional rugby union centre and winger currently playing for Castres Olympique in the Top 14. He is 1.85m tall and weighs 105 kg. David studied at the private school St.Joseph Bourgoin-Jallieu. He has also participated for Dieux du Stade in 2007. He played 30 matches for Bourgoin scoring 6 tries before joining Toulouse in 2009. In 2010 he was a replacement for the final as Toulouse won the Heineken Cup.

David made his debut for the France national team on March 9, 2008 against Italy in the 2008 Six Nations Championship. He was also included in the French team for the 2009 end of year rugby tests.

He is the son of Javelin Thrower Monika Fiafialoto.

On 16 November 2020, David would leave Castres to join Top 14 rivals Bayonne on a two-year deal from the 2021-22 season
