= Lyakhovich =

Lyakhovich, Lyakhovych, Liakhovich is a variously transliterated East-Slavic surname meaning "descendant of Lyakh/Lah, i.e., of a Pole. Notable people with the surname include:

- Aliaksandr Liakhovich
- Siarhei Liakhovich
- Tetyana Lyakhovych
