= Anne Renaud (athlete) =

French hurdler

Personal information
- Nationality: French
- Born: 24 March 1970 (age 55) Ambilly
- Years active: 1990s

Sport
- Event: 400 m hurdles

Anne Renaud (born 24 March 1970 in Ambilly) is a former French athlete, who specialized in the 400 meters hurdles.

== Biography ==
She won three titles of champion of France in the 400m hurdles in 1995, 1996 and 1997.

=== Prize list ===
- French Championships in Athletics :
  - 3 times winner of the 400m hurdles in 1995, 1996 and 1997.

=== Records ===
Personal Bests
Event	Performance	Location	Date
400 m hurdles	56.51s		1996

== Notes and references ==
- Docathlé2003, Fédération française d'athlétisme, 2003, p. 428
