= Monika Fiafialoto =

French javelin thrower

Personal information
- Nationality: France
- Born: 1 March 1965 (age 61) Wallis

Sport
- Event: Javelin Throw

Monica Fiafialoto (born 1 March 1965 at Wallis) is a former French athlete, who specialised in the javelin. She is the mother of rugby player Yann David.

== Biography ==
She won two French national javelin titles in 1983 and 1985. She notably made a record throw of 57.10m.

=== Prizes Won ===
- French Championships in Athletics :
  - 2-time winner in the javelin throw in 1983 and 1985.

=== Records ===
Personal Records
Event	Performance	Location	Date
Javelin Throw (old model)	57.10m		1983
