= Christiane Nuss =

French athletics competitor

Christiane Nuss (born December 31, 1943) at Strasbourg) is a former French athlete, who specialised in the shot put.

== Biography ==
She won two championship titles of France shot put in 1964 and 1965.

=== prize list ===
- French Championships in Athletics :
  - 2 times winner of the shot put in 1964 and 1965.

=== Records ===
personal records
Event	Performance	Location	Date
Lancer du poids	14.21m		1967

== notes and references ==
- Docathlé2003, Fédération française d'athlétisme, 2003, p. 423
