= Dominique Le Dissès =

French hurdler

Personal information
- Nationality: French
- Born: 29 August 1957 (age 68) Urzy
- Years active: 1979-1884

Sport
- Event: 400 m hurdles

Dominique Le Dissès (née Laval; born 29 August 1957) is a former French athlete, who specialized in the 400 meters hurdles.

== Biography ==
She won five French championship titles for the 400m hurdles in 1979, 1980, 1981, 1983 and 1984.

=== Prize list ===
- French Championships in Athletics :
  - 5 times winner of the 400m hurdles in 1979, 1980, 1981, 1983 and 1984.

=== Records ===
Personal Bests
Event	Performance	Location	Date
400 m hurdles	57.65s		1984

== Notes and references ==
- Docathlé2003, Fédération française d'athlétisme, 2003, p. 414
