= Claudie Cuvelier =

French athlete

Personal information
- Nationality: French
- Born: 13 May 1943 (age 82) Wignehies, France

Sport
- Event(s): shot put, discus throw

Claudie Cuvelier (married name is Schisano) (born 13 May 1943 at Wignehies) is a former French athlete, who specialised in the shot put and the discus throw.

== Biography ==
She won three French national championship titles in the shot put (1966, 1967 and 1969) and three championships titles in the discus throw (1967, 1968 and 1969).

Three times she improved the French shot put record (14.58m, 15.11m and 15.31m in 1967). She also bettered the record three times in the discus (48.54m, 49.70m in 1967, and 50.82m in 1969).

=== Prize list ===
- French Championships in Athletics:
  - 3 times winner of the shot put in 1966, 1967 and 1969
  - 3 times winner of the discus in 1967, 1968 and 1969.

=== Records ===
Personal records
Event	Performance	Location	Date
Shot Put	15.31 m		1967
Discus throw	51.02 m		1969
