= Nadine Fourcade =

French long jumper

Personal information
- Nationality: France
- Born: 25 February 1963 Reims
- Died: 19 April 2011 (aged 48)

Sport
- Event: Long Jump

Achievements and titles
- National finals: French Long Jump Record Holders

Nadine Fourcade (25 February 1963 – 19 April 2011) was a French athlete, who specialized in the Long jump.

== Biography ==
She was member, first of the Stade de Reims team and then the DAC Reims team. At first she competed in high jump, long jump, and combined events, but eventually specialized in long jump. She was a member of the junior French national team three times and the senior French national team ten times from 1980 to 1988. She competed in the European Championship finals in Stuttgart (1986) with a long jump of 6.52 meters.

She won three French National Outdoor championship titles in 1986, 1987 and 1988, and won two other titles indoors in 1985 and 1986. On May 4 1985, at Montgeron, she established a new French Long Jump record with a jump of 6.79m, 17 cm beyond the former national jump record set by Jackie Curtet.

=== Prizes ===
- French Championships in Athletics :
  - Outdoors: Winner of the long jump 1986, 1987 and 1988
  - Indoors: Winner of the long jump in 1985 and 1986.

=== Records ===
personal records
Event	Performance	Location	Date
Long jump	6.79 m	Montgeron	4 May 1985
