= Suzanne Griesbach =

Personal information
- Nationality: French
- Born: 22 April 1945 (age 80)
- Years active: 1979-1990
- Height: 1.62 m (5 ft 4 in)
- Weight: 47 kg (104 lb)

Sport
- Event: race walking

Suzanne Griesbach is a former French athlete, who was a walker, 1.62 m tall and 47 kg in weight, born April 22, 1945. She competes for club AS Strasbourg. She has 19 individual championship French titles in race walking.

== prize list ==
- 42 caps for France A, between 1979 and 1990
- Record holder of France for 5 km walk. She set this record 3 times, in 1982, in 1986 and in 1987. Her 1987 record was 22 min 49 s 06
- Record holder of France's 10 km walk. She set this record 6 times, 1981, 1982, 1983, 1984, 1986 and 1987. In 1987 her record was 47 min 16 s 8
- Record holder of France for veterans 3 times, both on 5 km and 10 km walk between 1987 and 1990s
- (gold) Champion of France 5 km walk 8 consecutive times, from 1981 to 1988
- (gold) Champion of France of the 10 km walk in 1981, 1982, 1983, 1984, 1986 and 1987
- (gold) Champion of France of 3 km walk Indoors in 1983, 1985, 1986, 1987 and 1988
