= USM Malakoff =

Multi-sport club in Malakoff, France

- Full name: Union Sportive Municipale de Malakoff
- Sport: Athletics; Badminton; Basketball; Bocce volo Boxing; Fitness and Dancing; Football; Gym; Handball; Martial arts
- Founded: 1945

Union Sportive Municipale de Malakoff is a multi-sport club located in Malakoff, France. Founded in 1945 as a result of a merger between Malakoff Sportif and Acacias Sportifs de Malakoff, the club is best known for its football and handball sections.
