= Caroline O'Shea (athlete) =

Irish middle-distance runner

Personal information
- Nationality: Irish
- Born: 30 December 1960 (age 65)

Sport
- Sport: Middle-distance running
- Event: 800 metres

Caroline O'Shea (born 30 December 1960) is an Irish middle-distance runner. She competed in the women's 800 metres at the 1984 Summer Olympics.
