= Hélène Huart =

French hurdler (born 1965)

Personal information
- Nationality: French
- Born: 19 June 1965 (age 61) Figeac, France
- Years active: 1980s

Sport
- Event: 400 metres hurdles

Hélène Huart (French pronunciation: [elɛn ɥaʁ]; born 19 June 1965) is a French former athlete who specialized in the 400 metres hurdles.

== Biography ==
Huart won three titles of champion of France in the 400 m hurdles: in 1985, 1987 and 1988.

She placed seventh in the 4 × 400 m relay during the 1987 World Championships in Athletics, alongside Nathalie Simon, Nadine Debois and Fabienne Ficher.

She won the title in the 400 m hurdles at the 1989 Games of La Francophonie.

She was in the Olympic 4 x 400 metre relay at the 1988 Summer Olympics but did not start.

=== Championships titles ===
- French Athletics Championships:
  - 3 times winner of the 400 m hurdles in 1985, 1987 and 1988.
