= Léone Bertimon =

French athlete

Personal information
- Nationality: France
- Born: 16 August 1950 (age 75) Pointe-Noire

Sport
- Event: Shot put
Medal record
Representing France
Mediterranean Games
Gold medal – first place	1979 Split	Shot put

Leone Bertimon (born 16 August 1950 at Pointe-Noire) is a former French athlete, who specialised in the shot put.

== Biography ==
Léone measured 1.78 m and weighed 76 kg when competing. She competed for club Bouillante up to 1972, and since 1973 she competed in France at VGA Saint-Maur.

She won 21 titles French Athletics Championships: 12 outdoor (1974 to 1989), and 9 indoor (1973–1988). Her only rival was at that time was Frenchwomen Simone Créantor.

She also played in the reserve basketball team of her club, at Saint-Maur. Her brother, Charlus Bertimon was the French record holder of the javelin throw four times.

Bertimon has been a physical education teacher at Louis Blanc college of St Maur Des Fosses, in Val de Marne.

== International competitions ==
- (gold) gold medal Francophone Games in 1989 (39 years)
- (gold) gold medal Mediterranean Games in 1979
- Participation in 11 European Cups (French record) from 1973 to 1991
- 69 caps for France A over 24 years (women's record) from 1972 to 1995

== National records ==
- Record holder of France 6 times, for 10 years, with an increase of 1.85 m; 2 times in 1973, 1975 3 times, and 1977 with 17.16 m
- Holder of the Indoor record in France 1981, at 16.77 m
- Record holder of France veteran -in Shot Put 4 in 3 age groups: F40 in 1991, in 1996 F45 and F50 in 2001

== National titles ==
- (gold) Champion of France from 1973 to 1980, then in 1982, 1983, 1984 and 1989. All together 12 titles.
- (gold) France champion indoors in 1973 1974, 1976, 1978, 1980, 1981, 1982, 1987 and 1988. All together 9 titles.
- (gold) Junior Champion of France: once
