= Caroline Honoré =

French triple jumper

Personal information
- Born: 29 April 1970 (age 55) Clermont-Ferrand, France
- Years active: 1990s
- Height: 171 cm (5 ft 7 in)
- Weight: 58 kg (128 lb)

Sport
- Country: France
- Sport: Athletics
- Event: Triple jump

Caroline Honoré (born 29 April 1970 at Clermont-Ferrand) is a former French athlete, who specialized in the triple jump.

== Biography ==
She won two titles French National Championships in the triple jump: in 1993 and 1996.

She twice improved the French triple jump record: 13.51 m and 13.65 m, done on 23 July 1993 at Annecy during the French championships.

=== Prize list ===
- French Championships in Athletics :
  - winner of the triple jump 1993 and 1996

=== Records ===
Personal records
Event	Performance	Location	Date
Triple jump	13.84 m		1999
