= Véronique Renties =

French middle-distance runner

Personal information
- Nationality: French
- Born: 3 July 1960 (age 66) Valenciennes, France
- Years active: 1978–1980

Sport
- Event: middle distance running

Véronique Renties (born 3 July 1960 at Valenciennes) is a French former athlete, who specialized in the middle distances.

== Biography ==
She won five French Championship Athletic titles: two in the 800 meters in 1979 and 1980 and three in the 1500 meters in 1978, 1979 and 1980.

She held the French junior record for 1000 meters in 2:37.2 (1979).

== Events ==
- French Championships in Athletics :
  - 2 times winner 800 m in 1979 and 1980.
  - 3 times winner of 1,500 m in 1978, 1979 and 1980.

== Records ==
Personal Bests
Event	Performance	Location	Date
800 m	2:04.1		1979
1 500 m	4:10.54		1980
