= Hafida Gadi =

French long-distance runner

Personal information
- Born: 14 July 1974 (age 52) Saint-Étienne, France
- Height: 164 cm (5 ft 5 in)
- Weight: 47 kg (104 lb)

Sport
- Country: France
- Sport: Athletics (Long-distance running)
- Event: Marathon

Hafida Gadi (born 14 July 1974) is a French long-distance runner. She competed in the women's marathon at the 2004 Summer Olympics.
