= Nadine Caster =

French long jumper

Personal information
- Nationality: France
- Born: 15 October 1965 (age 60) Le François, Martinique

Sport
- Event: Long jump

Nadine Caster (born 15 October 1965 at François) is a French athlete, who specializes in the long jump.

== Biography ==
Nadine won four French national titles in the long jump: 1994, 1995, 1996 and 2004. On 25 June 1995, at Villeneuve d'AscqIt, Nadine established a new French long jump record with a jump of 6.94m, improving by 15 cm the former best national jump held since 1985 by Nadine Fourcade.

=== prize list ===
- French Championships in Athletics :
  - winner of the long jump 1994, 1995, 1996 and 2004.

=== Records ===
personal records
Event	Performance	Location	Date
Long jump	6.94m	Villeneuve-d'Ascq	25 June 1995
