= Martine Bègue =

French javelin thrower

Personal information
- Nationality: France
- Born: 22 December 1969 (age 56) Saint-Benoît, Réunion

Sport
- Event: Javelin throw

Martine Begue (born 22 December 1969) is a former French javelin thrower.

== Biography ==
She won three French national titles in the Javelin in 1989, 1992 and 1993.

In 1993, she set a new French javelin record with a throw of 64.46m.

=== Results ===
- French Championships in Athletics :
  - 3 times winner of the javelin in 1989, 1992 and 1993.

=== Records ===
personal records
| Event | Performance | Location | Date |
|---|---|---|---|
| Javelin Throw (old model) | 64.46m | | 1993 |
