= Annie Boclé =

French javelin thrower

Personal information
- Other names: Annie Clidière
- Born: 6 July 1957 (age 68) Paimpol, France
- Height: 170 cm (5 ft 7 in)
- Weight: 55 kg (121 lb)

Sport
- Country: France
- Sport: Athletics
- Event: Javelin throw

Annie Boclé (married name is Clidière, born 6 July 1957 in Paimpol) is a French former athlete, who specialised in the javelin.

== Biography ==
She won three French national titles in the Javelin, in 1974, 1976 and 1980.

Her personal best in the javelin is 54.58 m (1981).

=== prize list ===
- French Championships in Athletics :
  - winner in the javelin 1974, 1976 and 1980

=== Records ===
personal records
Event	Performance	Location	Date
Javelin	54.58 m		1981
