= Vanya Gospodinova =

Bulgarian middle-distance runner

Vanya Gospodinova (Bulgarian: Ваня Господинова), née Stoyanova (Стоянова; born 12 December 1958) is a retired Bulgarian middle-distance runner who specialized in the 800 and 1500 metres.

She finished fourth in the 1500 metres at the 1981 European Indoor Championships, and again at the 1984 European Indoor Championships, and competed in 800 metres at the 1982 European Championships without reaching the final. She became Bulgarian indoor champion in the 800 metres in 1984, in the 1500 metres in 1981, 1984, 1986, 1988 and 1989 and in 3000 metres in 1988. Outdoors, she became Bulgarian 1500 metres champion in 1981.

Her personal bests in her main events were 1:58.78 minutes in the 800 metres, achieved in July 1982 in Sofia, and 4:03.14 minutes in the 1500 metres, achieved in June 1984 in Sochi. She also had 4:21.78 minutes in the mile run, achieved in June 1982 in Budapest.
