= Florence Giolitti =

French middle-distance runner

Personal information
- Nationality: French
- Born: 31 August 1966 (age 59) Nice, France
- Years active: 1984-1992
- Height: 1.71 m (5 ft 7 in)

Sport
- Event: middle distance running

Florence Giolitti (born 31 August 1966) is a former French athlete, who specialized in the middle-distance running. She held the 800m record in 1986.

== Biography ==
Giolitti won three French National 800m titles: two outdoors in 1984 and 1991, and one indoors in 1992.

On 15 July 1986, in Nice, she recorded a new French 800 meters running 1:59.32. She also improved the French 1500 meters three times, bringing it to 4:05.78 in 1987 in Zurich.

She still holds the France junior record for 800 m and for 1,500m, and France U-23 records for 800 m, 1,000 m and 1,500 m.

== Championships titles ==
=== National ===
- French Championships in Athletics :
  - winner of the 800m 1984 and 1991
  - winner of the 800 meters indoors in 1992

== Records ==
Personal Bests
Event	Performance	Location	Date
800 m	1:59.32		1986
1 500 m	4:05.78		1987
