= Brigitte Rougeron =

French high jumper

Personal information
- Born: 14 June 1961 (age 64) Paris, France
- Height: 182 cm (6 ft 0 in)
- Weight: 68 kg (150 lb)

Sport
- Country: France
- Sport: Athletics
- Event: High jump
- Club: CCSS Lingolsheim
- Coached by: Marc Schott

Brigitte Rougeron (born 14 June 1961 in Paris) is a retired French high jumper.

She finished fifth at the 1985 European Indoor Championships. She became French champion in 1981 and 1986.

Her personal best jump was 1.92 metres, achieved in May 1984 in Haguenau.

Her coach was Marc Schott.

== Prize List ==
Performances

- (gold) Champion of France in the High Jump en 1981 et 1986
- Participation in the 1984 Olympic Games at Los Angeles
- 13 International Selections
