= Simone Créantor =

French athlete (1948–2020)

Personal information
- Nationality: France
- Born: 2 June 1948 Grand-Bourg
- Died: 12 February 2020 (aged 71)

Sport
- Event: Shot Put

Simone Créantor (2 June 1948 – 12 February 2020) was a French athlete, who specialised in the shot put.

== Biography ==
Créantor was born at Grand-Bourg. She won thirteen titles French national championships in the shot put, five outdoor and eight indoor.

She won the silver medal at the 1983 Mediterranean Games, and also in the 1987 Mediterranean Games.

Her personal best, established in 1984, is 17.45m.

== Prize list ==
=== National ===
- French Championships in Athletics :
  - winner of the shot put in 1972, 1981, 1985, 1986 and 1987
- Indoors Athletics Championships of France:
  - winner of the shot put in 1972, 1975, 1977, 1979, 1983, 1984, 1985 and 1986

== Records ==
personal records
Épreuve	Performance	Location	Date
Shot Put	17.45 m		1984
