= Marthe Bretelle =

French athlete

Personal information
- Nationality: France
- Born: 9 June 1936 Dantzig
- Died: 12 December 1995 (aged 59)

Sport
- Event(s): shot put, discus throw
- Club: CO Pantin (1952-1953); US Métro Paris (1954-1958); VGA Saint-Maur (1959-1971)

Marthe Bretelle (9 June 1936 at Dantzig, in Poland – 12 December 1995) was a French athlete who specialised in the discus throw and the shot put.

Selected 37 times for France national teams, she won 13 national titles in France, including 11 outdoor. She has the distinction of being a French international athlete in all three throwing events in force at the time (shot put, discus and javelin).

Marthe Bretelle competed for clubs CO Pantin (1952–1953), US Métro Paris (1954–1958) and VGA Saint-Maur (1959–1971).

She taught physical education at Henri Bergson lycée (Paris)from Paris.

== Prize list ==
- French Championships in Athletics :
  - Winner of the discus in 1957, 1960, 1961, 1962, 1963, 1964, 1965 and 1966
  - Winner of the shot put in 1956, 1957 and 1963.
