= Isabelle Devaluez =

French discus thrower

Personal information
- Born: 17 March 1966 (age 60) Grenoble, Isère, France

Sport
- Sport: Track and field
Medal record
Representing France
Mediterranean Games
Silver medal – second place	1991 Athens	Discus throw
Bronze medal – third place	1987 Latakia	Discus throw
Bronze medal – third place	1997 Bari	Discus throw

Isabelle Devaluez (born 17 March 1966) is a retired female discus thrower from France, who competed in the discus contest at the 1996 Summer Olympics in Atlanta, Georgia. There she ended up in 37th place (55.08 metres). Devaluez set her personal best in the women's discus throw event (62.02 metres) on 15 June 1996 in La Garde. She was the bronze medallist in the discus at the 1997 Mediterranean Games.

== Achievements ==
Year	Competition	Venue	Position	Notes
Representing France
1996	Olympic Games	Atlanta, United States	37th	55.08 m
