= Margrit Klinger =

German middle-distance runner

Medal record

Women's athletics

Representing West Germany

European Championships
Bronze medal – third place	1982 Athens	800 m

Margrit Klinger (born 22 June 1960 in Obersuhl-Hönebach) is a retired West German middle-distance runner who specialized in the 800 metres.

Her personal best time in 800 metres is 1:57.22 minutes, achieved at the 1982 European Championships in Athens. This places her eighth on the German all-time list, behind Sigrun Wodars, Christine Wachtel, Elfi Zinn, Anita Weiß, Martina Kämpfert, Ulrike Klapezynski and Hildegard Ullrich. Her personal best time in 1500 metres is 4:02.66 minutes, achieved in August 1983 in Köln. This places her tenth on the German all-time list, behind Christiane Wartenberg, Hildegard Körner, Angelika Zauber, Andrea Lange, Ulrike Klapezynski, Beate Liebich, Kristina da Fonseca-Wollheim, Brigitte Kraus and Gunhild Hoffmeister.

Klinger competed for the sports club TV Obersuhl during her active career.

== Achievements ==
Year	Tournament	Venue	Result	Extra
1982	European Championships	Athens, Greece	3rd	1:57.22 PB
1983	World Championships	Helsinki, Finland	4th	
1984	Olympic Games	Los Angeles, U.S.	7th	
