= Sarah Walter =

French javelin thrower

Personal information
- Nationality: France
- Born: 5 May 1978 (age 48) Schiltigheim, France
- Height: 1.73 m (5 ft 8 in)

Sport
- Event: Javelin Throw
- Club: S.R. Obernai
- Coached by: Jean Ritzenthaler, Gilles Dupray
Medal record
Representing France
European Junior Championships
| Silver medal – second place | 1997 Ljubljana | Javelin throw |

Sarah Walter (born 5 May 1978) is a retired French athlete, who specialised in the Javelin. She has held, since 2003, the French javelin record with a throw of 62.53 m.

== Biography ==
She won the silver medal in the 1997 European Athletics Junior Championships, she won four French national javelin titles in 1997, 2002, 2003 and 2005.

On 12 June 2002, in Bordeaux, she set a new nationl javelin record of 62.48 m, improving by 32 cm the former best national mark held since 2000 by Nadine Auzeil. On 27 June 2003, in Strasbourg, she bettered this record to 62.53 m.

== Titles ==
=== National ===
- French Championships in Athletics:
  - winner in the javelin 1997, 2002, 2003 and 2005

== Records ==
personal records
| Event | Performance | Location | Date |
|---|---|---|---|
| Javelin | 62.53 m | Strasbourg | 27 June 2003 |
