= Hildegard Körner =

German middle-distance runner (born 1959)

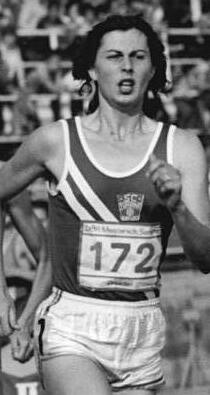
- Ullrich in 1980

Medal record

Women's athletics

Representing East Germany

European Indoor Championships
Gold medal – first place	1981 Grenoble	800 m

Hildegard Körner (née Ullrich; born 20 December 1959 in Urnshausen) is a retired East German middle-distance runner who specialized in the 800 metres.

She competed for the sports club SC Turbine Erfurt during her active career.

== Achievements ==
Year	Tournament	Venue	Result	Extra
1978	European Championships	Prague, Czechoslovakia	5th	800 m
1980	Olympic Games	Moscow, Soviet Union	5th	800 m
1981	European Indoor Championships	Athens, Greece	1st	800 m
1982	European Championships	Athens, Greece	5th	800 m
1987	World Championships	Rome, Italy	2nd	1500 m
