= Nadine Debois =

French middle-distance runner and sprinter (born 1961)

Personal information
- Born: 25 September 1961 (age 64) Paris, France
- Height: 1.73

Sport
- Country: France
- Sport: Athletics
- Event(s): Heptathlon, pentathlon, 400 metres
- Club: CSM Clamart

Nadine Debois (French pronunciation: [nadin dəbwa]; born 25 September 1961) is a French former athlete who specialised in the 400 metres and combined events. She was the world record holder for the fastest 800 metres ever run in a heptathlon from 1987 to 2025, until Anna Hall improved her mark en route to breaking 7000 points.

== Biography ==
Nadine Debois was the first holder of the French record in the heptathlon in 1981 with 5,537 points. She improved this record in 1986 with 6,333 points.

In 1987, she was part of the French women's 4 × 400 m relay that placed seventh during the 1987 World Championships in Athletics in Rome. French national team with Debois finished with the same result in this discipline at the 1988 Olympic Games in Seoul.

She won five French championship titles: two outdoors in the long jump and heptathlon, and three in the indoor 400 metres and pentathlon.

== Achievements ==
=== Prize list ===
- French Athletics Championships
  - Long jump: 1985
  - Heptathlon: 1987
- French Indoor Athletics Championships
  - 400 metres: 1986
  - Pentathlon: 1986, 1987

=== Personal bests ===
Event	Performance	Place	Date	Notes
800 metres	2:01.84 min	Talence, France	27 September 1987	Former world record in a heptathlon
Heptathlon	6242 pts	Arles, France	8 September 1985	
