= Nathalie Thoumas =

French middle-distance runner

Natalie Thoumas
Personal information
- Nationality: French
- Born: 30 April 1962 (age 64) Agen, France
- Years active: 1981-1991

Sport
- Event: 800m
Medal record
Representing France
Mediterranean Games
Gold medal – first place	1983 Casablanca	800m
Silver medal – second place	1983 Casablanca	4x400m relay

Natalie Thoumas (born 30 April 1962) is a former French middle-distance runner, who specialized in the 800 metres. She won the gold medal at the 1983 Mediterranean Games in Casablanca, Morocco.

She won nine national titles in the 800 m: six outdoors at the French Athletics Championships in 1981, 1982, 1983, 1985, 1986 and 1989, and three at the French Indoor Athletics Championships in 1984, 1988 and 1991.

Her personal best at 800 m, recorded in 1987, is 1:59.83.

== Championships titles ==
- French Athletics Championships
  - 800 m: 1981, 1982, 1983, 1985, 1986, 1989
- French Indoor Athletics Championships:
  - 800 m: 1984, 1988, 1991
