= Geneviève Laureau =

French high jumper

Personal information
- Nationality: France
- Born: 25 January 1941 (age 85) Orléans

Sport
- Event: High Jump

Geneviève Laureau (born 25 January 1941 at Orleans) is a former French athlete, who specialized in the high jump.

== Biography ==
Geneviève Laureau won three championship titles of France in the high jump in 1963, 1965 and 1966.

In 1963, she set a new French record in the high jump jumping 1.72 m.

== Events ==
- French Championships in Athletics :
  - 3 times winner of the high jump in 1963, 1965 and 1966.

== Records ==
Personal records
Event	Performance	Location	Date
High jump	1.75 m		1969
