= Jill McCabe =

Swedish middle-distance runner

Personal information
- National team: Sweden
- Born: 5 September 1962 (age 63) Liverpool, Lancashire, England

Sport
- Sport: Athletics

Jill Nichole McCabe Petersson (born 5 September 1962) is a former Swedish female athlete who also represented Sweden in the 1984 Summer Olympics. Jill McCabe competed at the 800m and 1500m events during the 1984 Olympics.
