= Women's 4 × 400 metres relay world record progression =

The following table shows the world record progression in the women's 4 × 400 metres relay. The first world record in the event was recognised by the International Association of Athletics Federations in 1969. 15 world records have been ratified by the IAAF in the event.

== Records since 1969 ==
| Time | Auto | Team | Country | Venue | Date | Participants |
|---|---|---|---|---|---|---|
| 3:47.4 | | Moscow | Soviet Union | Moscow | 1969-05-30 | Ljubov Finogenova, Tatjana Medvedeva, Tamara Voitenko, Olga Klein |
| 3:43.2 | | Latvia | Soviet Union | Minsk | 1969-06-01 | Lilita Zāģere, Anna Dundare, Ingrīda Verbele, Sarmīte Štūla |
| 3:37.6 | | Great Britain & N.I. | Great Britain | London | 1969-06-22 | Jenny Pawsey, Pauline Attwood, Janet Simpson, Lillian Board |
| 3:34.2 | | France | France | Colombes | 1969-07-06 | Michele Mombet, Éliane Jacq, Nicole Duclos, Colette Besson |
| 3:33.9 | | West Germany | West Germany | Piraeus | 1969-09-19 | Christa Czekay, Antje Gleichfeld, Inge Eckhoff, Christel Frese |
| 3:30.8 | 3:30.82 | Great Britain & N.I. | Great Britain | Piraeus | 1969-09-20 | Rosemary Stirling, Pat Lowe, Janet Simpson, Lillian Board |
| 3:30.8 | 3:30.85 | France | France | Athens | 1969-09-20 | Bernadette Martin, Nicole Duclos, Éliane Jacq, Colette Besson |
| 3:29.3 | 3:29.28 | East Germany | East Germany | Helsinki | 1971-08-15 | Rita Kühne, Ingelore Lohse, Helga Seidler, Monika Zehrt |
| 3:28.8 | | East Germany | East Germany | Colombes | 1972-07-05 | Dagmar Käsling, Rita Kühne, Monika Zehrt, Brigitte Rohde |
| 3:28.5 | 3:28.48 | East Germany | East Germany | Munich | 1972-09-09 | Dagmar Käsling, Rita Kühne, Helga Seidler, Monika Zehrt |
| 3:23.0 | 3:22.95 | East Germany | East Germany | Munich | 1972-09-10 | Dagmar Käsling, Rita Kühne, Helga Seidler, Monika Zehrt |
| 3:19.2 | 3:19.23 | East Germany | East Germany | Montreal | 1976-07-31 | Doris Maletzki, Brigitte Rohde, Ellen Streidt, Christina Brehmer |
| 3:19.04 | | East Germany | East Germany | Athens | 1982-09-11 | Kirsten Siemon, Sabine Busch, Dagmar Rübsam, Marita Koch |
| 3:15.92 | | East Germany | East Germany | Erfurt | 1984-06-03 | Gesine Walther, Sabine Busch, Dagmar Rübsam, Marita Koch |
| 3:15.17 | | Soviet Union | Soviet Union | Seoul | 1988-10-01 | Tatyana Ledovskaya, Olga Nazarova, Mariya Pinigina, Olga Bryzgina |
