= 1971 European Athletics Championships – Women's 400 metres =

Women's 400 metres at the European Athletics Championships
- Venue: Helsinki Olympic Stadium
- Location: Helsinki, Finland
- Dates: 10, 11, and 12 August 1971
- Competitors: 28 from 14 nations
- Winning time: 52.14 s NR

Medalists
gold medal	Helga Seidler	East Germany
silver medal	Inge Bödding	West Germany
bronze medal	Ingelore Lohse	East Germany

The women's 400 metres at the 1971 European Athletics Championships was held in Helsinki, Finland, at Helsinki Olympic Stadium on 10, 11, and 12 August 1971.

== Results ==
=== Heats ===
10 August

==== Heat 1 ====
Rank	Name	Nationality	Time	Notes
1	Rita Kühne	East Germany	53.17	Q
2	Colette Besson	France	53.18	Q
3	Anette Rückes	West Germany	53.56	Q
4	Karin Lundgren	Sweden	53.77	Q
5	Svetla Zlateva	Bulgaria	54.03	
6	Mariana Suman	Romania	54.33	
7	Bożena Zientarska	Poland	55.04	

==== Heat 2 ====
Rank	Name	Nationality	Time	Notes
1	Helga Seidler	East Germany	52.70	Q
2	Inge Bödding	West Germany	53.01	Q
3	Natalya Chistyakova	Soviet Union	53.18	Q
4	Marianne Burggraaf	Netherlands	53.57	Q
5	Bernadette Martin	France	53.72	
6	Danuta Piecyk	Poland	54.30	
7	Stefka Yordanova	Bulgaria	55.14	

==== Heat 3 ====
Rank	Name	Nationality	Time	Notes
1	Marika Eklund	Finland	54.35	Q
2	Christel Frese	West Germany	54.42	Q
3	Karoline Käfer	Austria	54.48	Q
4	Elisabeth Randerz	Sweden	54.50	Q
5	Krystyna Hryniewicka	Poland	54.67	
6	Lyubov Aksenova	Soviet Union	54.91	
7	Josefina Salgado	Spain	56.27	

==== Heat 4 ====
Rank	Name	Nationality	Time	Notes
1	Ingelore Lohse	East Germany	53.34	Q
2	Maria Sykora	Austria	53.49	Q
3	Mona-Lisa Strandvall	Finland	53.69	Q
4	Jannette Roscoe	Great Britain	53.95	Q
5	Nadezhda Kolesnikova	Soviet Union	54.35	
6	Eva-Charlotte Malmström	Sweden	54.65	
7	Ingunn Einarsdóttir	Iceland	1:00.33	

=== Semi-finals ===
11 August

==== Semi-final 1 ====
Rank	Name	Nationality	Time	Notes
1	Helga Seidler	East Germany	52.77	Q
2	Colette Besson	France	52.88	Q
3	Marika Eklund	Finland	53.11	Q
4	Natalya Chistyakova	Soviet Union	53.16	Q
5	Karoline Käfer	Austria	53.70	
6	Marianne Burggraaf	Netherlands	53.77	
7	Karin Lundgren	Sweden	53.95	
8	Anette Rückes	West Germany	54.36	

==== Semi-final 2 ====
Rank	Name	Nationality	Time	Notes
1	Ingelore Lohse	East Germany	52.99	Q
2	Inge Bödding	West Germany	53.16	Q
3	Maria Sykora	Austria	53.27	Q
4	Rita Kühne	East Germany	53.75	Q
5	Mona-Lisa Strandvall	Finland	54.03	
6	Christel Frese	West Germany	54.11	
7	Jannette Roscoe	Great Britain	54.59	
8	Elisabeth Randerz	Sweden	54.88	

=== Final ===
12 August

Rank	Name	Nationality	Time	Notes
1st place, gold medalist(s)	Helga Seidler	East Germany	52.14	NR
2nd place, silver medalist(s)	Inge Bödding	West Germany	52.90	
3rd place, bronze medalist(s)	Ingelore Lohse	East Germany	52.93	
4	Maria Sykora	Austria	53.01	
5	Natalya Chistyakova	Soviet Union	53.19	
6	Marika Eklund	Finland	53.35	
7	Colette Besson	France	53.70	
8	Rita Kühne	East Germany	53.91	
