= Athletics at the 1972 Summer Olympics – Women's 4 × 400 metres relay =

Women's 4 × 400 metres relay at the Games of the XX Olympiad
- Venue: Olympic Stadium
- Dates: 9–10 September 1972
- Competitors: from 14 nations

Medalists
| 1st place, gold medalist(s) | | Dagmar Käsling, Rita Kühne, Helga Seidler, Monika Zehrt | East Germany |
| 2nd place, silver medalist(s) | | Mable Fergerson, Madeline Manning, Cheryl Toussaint, Kathy Hammond | United States |
| 3rd place, bronze medalist(s) | | Anette Rückes, Inge Bödding, Hildegard Falck, Rita Wilden | West Germany |

These are the official results of the women's 4 × 400 metres relay event at the 1972 Summer Olympics in Munich, West Germany. The event was held on the 9 and 10 September 1972. There were a total number of 14 nations competing.

== Records ==
These were the standing World and Olympic records (in seconds) prior to the 1972 Summer Olympics.

| World record | 3:29.28 | (East Germany) Monika Zehrt (East Germany) Rita Kühne (East Germany) Ingelore Lohse (East Germany) Helga Seidler | Helsinki (FIN) | 27 July 1972 |

== Results ==
=== Final ===
- Held on 10 September 1972

| RANK | NATION | ATHLETES | TIME |
|---|---|---|---|
| Gold medal | East Germany | • Dagmar Käsling • Rita Kühne • Helga Seidler • Monika Zehrt | 3:22.95 (WR) |
| Silver medal | United States | • Mable Fergerson • Madeline Manning • Cheryl Toussaint • Kathy Hammond | 3:25.15 |
| Bronze medal | West Germany | • Anette Rückes • Inge Bödding • Hildegard Falck • Rita Wilden | 3:26.51 |
| 4. | France | • Martine Duvivier • Colette Besson • Bernadette Martin • Nicole Duclos | 3:27.5 |
| 5. | Great Britain | • Verona Bernard • Janet Simpson • Jannette Roscoe • Rosemary Stirling | 3:28.7 |
| 6. | Australia | • Allison Ross-Edwards • Raelene Boyle • Cheryl Peasley • Charlene Rendina | 3:28.8 |
| 7. | Finland | • Marika Eklund • Pirjo Wilmi • Tuula Rautanen • Mona-Lisa Strandvall | 3:29.4 |
| 8. | Soviet Union | • Lyubov Runtso • Olga Syrovatskaia • Natalya Chistiakova • Nadezhda Kolesnikova | 3:31.9 |

=== Semifinals ===
- Held on 9 September 1972

==== Heat 1 ====
| RANK | NATION | ATHLETES | TIME |
|---|---|---|---|
| 1. | West Germany | • Anette Rückes • Inge Bödding • Hildegard Falck • Rita Wilden | 3:29.3 |
| 2. | France | • Martine Duvivier • Colette Besson • Bernadette Martin • Nicole Duclos | 3:30.0 |
| 3. | Soviet Union | • Lyubov Runtso • Olga Syrovatskaia • Natalya Chistiakov • Nadezhda Kolesnikova | 3:30.2 |
| 4. | Finland | • Marika Eklund • Pirjo Wilmi • Tuula Rautanen • Mona-Lisa Strandvall | 3:30.8 |
| 5 | Cuba | • Asuncion Acosta • Marcela Chibás • Beatriz Castillo • Aurelia Pentón | 3:32:4 |
| 6. | Sweden | • Eva-Charlotte Malmström • Elisabeth Randerz • Ann Larsson • Karin Lundgren | 3:32.6 |
| 7. | Barbados | • Lorna Forde • Barbara Bishop • Marcia Trotman • Heather Gooding | 3:44.5 |

==== Heat 2 ====
| RANK | NATION | ATHLETES | TIME |
|---|---|---|---|
| 1. | East Germany | • Dagmar Käsling • Rita Kühne • Helga Seidler • Monika Zehrt | 3:28.5 (WR) |
| 2. | United States | • Mable Fergerson • Madeline Manning • Cheryl Toussaint • Kathy Hammond | 3:28.6 |
| 3. | Australia | • Allison Ross-Edwards • Raelene Boyle • Cheryl Peasley • Charlene Rendina | 3:30.0 |
| 4. | Great Britain | • Janet Simpson • Verona Bernard • Jannette Roscoe • Rosemary Stirling | 3:30.1 |
| 5. | Jamaica | • Ruth Williams • Una Morris • Rosie Allwood • Yvonne Saunders | 3:31.98 |
| 6. | Austria | • Christiane Casapicola • Maria Sykora • Gerlinde Massing • Karoline Käfer | 3:42.2 |
| — | Poland | • Bozena Zientarska • Krystyna Kacperczyk • Elżbieta Katolik • Danuta Piecyk | DSQ |
