= 1971 European Athletics Championships – Women's 4 × 400 metres relay =

Women's 4 × 400 metres relay at the European Athletics Championships

The women's 4 × 400 metres relay at the 1971 European Athletics Championships was held in Helsinki, Finland, at Helsinki Olympic Stadium on 14 and 15 August 1971.

== Medalists ==
| Gold | Rita Kühne; Ingelore Lohse; Helga Seidler; Monika Zehrt; East Germany |
| Silver | Anette Rückes; Christel Frese; Hildegard Falck; Inge Bödding; West Germany |
| Bronze | Raisa Nikanorova; Vera Popkova; Nadezhda Kolesnikova; Natalya Chistyakova; Soviet Union |

== Results ==
=== Final ===
15 August

| Rank | Nation | Competitors | Time | Notes |
|---|---|---|---|---|
| 1st place, gold medalist(s) | East Germany | Rita Kühne; Ingelore Lohse; Helga Seidler; Monika Zehrt | 3:29.28 | WR |
| 2nd place, silver medalist(s) | West Germany | Anette Rückes; Christel Frese; Hildegard Falck; Inge Bödding | 3:33.04 | |
| 3rd place, bronze medalist(s) | Soviet Union | Raisa Nikanorova; Vera Popkova; Nadezhda Kolesnikova; Natalya Chistyakova | 3:34.11 | |
| 4 | Great Britain | Verona Bernard; Jannette Roscoe; Patricia Lowe; Rosemary Stirling | 3:34.52 | |
| 5 | Poland | Bożena Zientarska; Elżbieta Skowrońska; Danuta Piecyk; Krystyna Hryniewicka | 3:35.28 | NR |
| 6 | Sweden | Eva-Charlotte Malmström; Ann Larsson; Elisabeth Randerz; Karin Lundgren | 3:37.09 | |
| 7 | Finland | Mona-Lisa Strandvall; Riitta Salin; Ruth Lindfors; Marika Eklund | 3:37.21 | NR |
| | France | Monique Noirot; Nicole Duclos; Bernadette Martin; Colette Besson | DNF | |

=== Heats ===
14 August

==== Heat 1 ====
| Rank | Nation | Competitors | Time | Notes |
|---|---|---|---|---|
| 1 | West Germany | Anette Rückes; Christel Frese; Hildegard Falck; Inge Bödding | 3:34.7 | Q |
| 2 | Great Britain | Verona Bernard; Jannette Roscoe; Patricia Lowe; Rosemary Stirling | 3:35.0 | Q |
| 3 | Soviet Union | Vera Popkova; Nadezhda Kolesnikova; Raisa Nikanorova; Natalya Chistyakova | 3:35.6 | Q |
| 4 | Sweden | Eva-Charlotte Malmström; Ann Larsson; Elisabeth Randerz; Karin Lundgren | 3:37.2 | Q |
| 5 | Austria | Gerlinde Massing; Karoline Käfer; Sonja Termoth; Maria Sykora | 3:40.8 | NR |

==== Heat 2 ====
| Rank | Nation | Competitors | Time | Notes |
|---|---|---|---|---|
| 1 | East Germany | Rita Kühne; Ingelore Lohse; Helga Seidler; Monika Zehrt | 3:34.2 | Q |
| 2 | France | Monique Noirot; Nicole Duclos; Bernadette Martin; Colette Besson | 3:35.6 | Q |
| 3 | Poland | Bożena Zientarska; Elżbieta Skowrońska; Danuta Piecyk; Krystyna Hryniewicka | 3:37.5 | Q |
| 4 | Finland | Mona-Lisa Strandvall; Riitta Salin; Ruth Lindfors; Marika Eklund | 3:41.2 | Q |
| 5 | Bulgaria | Ivanka Venkova; Stefka Yordanova; Tonka Petrova; Svetla Zlateva | 3:43.3 | |

== Participation ==
According to an unofficial count, 40 athletes from 10 countries participated in the event.

- Austria (4)
- Bulgaria (4)
- East Germany (4)
- Finland (4)
- France (4)
- Poland (4)
- Soviet Union (4)
- Sweden (4)
- Great Britain (4)
- West Germany (4)
