= List of European Athletics Championships records =

The European Athletics Championships has been held in a number of European countries; records have fallen in many cities.

The European Athletics Championships is a biennial event (since 2010), which began in 1934. European Athletics accepts only athletes who are representing one of the organisation's European member states and the body recognises records set at editions of the European Athletics Championships. The Championships records in athletics are the best marks set in competitions at the event. The athletics events at the Championships are divided into four groups: track events (including sprints, middle- and long-distance running, hurdling and relays), field events (including javelin, discus, hammer, pole vault, long and triple jumps), road events and combined events (the heptathlon and decathlon).

Great Britain's athletes holds the greatest number of records at the Championships with a total of ten, followed by Russia (9), Germany (7), and Spain (4). Marita Koch and Heike Drechsler each hold multiple records, Koch having broken both the 400 metres record as an individual and as part of the East German relay team and Drechsler holding the records for both long jump and 200 m. World records have been set at the Championships: the French 4×100 metres relay team ran a world record 37.79 seconds at the 1990 Championships. Several athletics events no longer take place at the Championships and thus the events are deemed defunct, and their records unchallengeable.

No records were broken at the 2012 European Athletics Championships – the first time in the history of the event. The 2026 edition took place between 10 and 16 August 2026 in Birmingham.

== Men's records ==
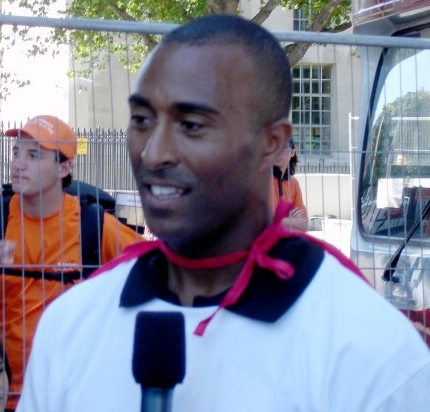
110 m hurdles record holder Colin Jackson won four European Championships gold medals.

Statistics are correct as of 19 August 2026

Event	Record	Athlete	Nation	Date	Venue	Ref.
100 m	9.95 (+0.0 m/s)	Zharnel Hughes	Great Britain	7 August 2018	2018 Berlin	
100 m	9.95 (+0.1 m/s)	Marcell Jacobs	Italy	16 August 2022	2022 Munich	
200 m	19.76 (+0.7 m/s)	Ramil Guliyev	Turkey	9 August 2018	2018 Berlin	
400 m	44.15	Alexander Doom	Belgium	10 June 2024	2024 Rome	
800 m	1:43.49	Mark English	Ireland	12 August 2026	2026 Birmingham	
1500 m	3:31.95	Jakob Ingebrigtsen	Norway	12 June 2024	2024 Rome	
5000 m	13:10.15	Jack Buckner	Great Britain	31 August 1986	1986 Stuttgart	
10,000 m	27:23.44	Andreas Almgren	Sweden	15 August 2026	2026 Birmingham	
Half marathon	1:01:03	Yemaneberhan Crippa	Italy	9 June 2024	2024 Rome	
Marathon	2:09:11	Amanal Petros	Germany	16 August 2026	2026 Birmingham	
110 m hurdles	13.02 (+1.5 m/s)	Colin Jackson	Great Britain	22 August 1998	1998 Budapest	
400 m hurdles	46.63	Karsten Warholm	Norway	14 August 2026	2026 Birmingham	
3000 m steeplechase	8:07.87	Mahiedine Mekhissi-Benabbad	France	1 August 2010	2010 Barcelona	
High jump	2.37 m	Gianmarco Tamberi	Italy	11 June 2024	2024 Rome	
Pole vault	6.15 m	Armand Duplantis	Sweden	16 August 2026	2026 Birmingham	
Long jump	8.65 m (−0.3 m/s)	Miltiadis Tentoglou	Greece	8 June 2024	2024 Rome	
Triple jump	18.18 m (−0.3 m/s)	Jordan Díaz	Spain	11 June 2024	2024 Rome	
Shot put	22.45 m	Leonardo Fabbri	Italy	8 June 2024	2024 Rome	
Discus throw	72.51 m	Kristjan Čeh	Slovenia	13 August 2026	2026 Birmingham	
Hammer throw	86.74 m	Yuriy Sedykh	Soviet Union	30 August 1986	1986 Stuttgart	
Javelin throw	90.40 m	Julian Weber	Germany	15 August 2026	2026 Birmingham	
Decathlon	8811 pts	Daley Thompson	Great Britain	27-28 August 1986	1986 Stuttgart	
20 km walk (road)	1:18:37	Francisco Fernández	Spain	6 August 2002	2002 Munich	
Half marathon walk (road)	1:23:23	Paul McGrath	Spain	15 August 2026	2026 Birmingham	
35 km walk (road)	2:26:49	Miguel Ángel López	Spain	16 August 2022	2022 Munich	
Marathon walk (road)	2:56:49	Massimo Stano	Italy	15 August 2026	2026 Birmingham	
50 km walk (road)	3:32:33	Yohann Diniz	France	15 August 2014	2014 Zürich	
4 × 100 m relay	37.67	Jeremiah Azu; Zharnel Hughes; Jona Efoloko; Nethaneel Mitchell-Blake	Great Britain	21 August 2022	2022 Munich	
4 × 400 m relay	2:58.10	Edoardo Scotti; Luca Sito; Mohamed Soudassi; Lorenzo Benati	Italy	14 August 2026	2026 Birmingham	

=== Decathlon disciplines ===
Event	Record	Athlete	Nation	Date	Championships	Place	Ref.
100 m	10.26 (+2.0 m/s)	Daley Thompson	Great Britain	27 August 1986	1986 Championships	Stuttgart, Germany	
Long jump	8.31 m (−1.0 m/s)	Simon Ehammer	Switzerland	15 August 2022	2022 Championships	Munich, Germany	
Shot put	17.13 m	Leo Neugebauer	Germany	12 August 2026	2026 Championships	Birmingham, United Kingdom	
High jump	2.22 m	Christian Schenk	East Germany	28 August 1990	1990 Championships	Split, Yugoslavia	
High jump	2.22 m	Andrei Krauchanka	Belarus	12 August 2014	2014 Championships	Zürich, Switzerland	
400 m	46.49	Jón Arnar Magnússon	Iceland	18 August 1998	1998 Championships	Budapest, Hungary	
110 m hurdles	13.55 (+0.5 m/s)	Arthur Abele	Germany	13 August 2014	2014 Championships	Zürich, Switzerland	
Discus throw	54.31 m	Leo Neugebauer	Germany	13 August 2026	2026 Championships	Birmingham, United Kingdom	
Pole vault	5.45 m	Eelco Sintnicolaas	Netherlands	29 July 2010	2010 Championships	Barcelona, Spain	
Javelin throw	76.05 m	Niklas Kaul	Germany	16 August 2022	2022 Championships	Munich, Germany	
1500 m	4:09.7 h	Leonid Litvinenko	Soviet Union	7 September 1974	1974 Championships	Rome, Italy	

== Women's records ==
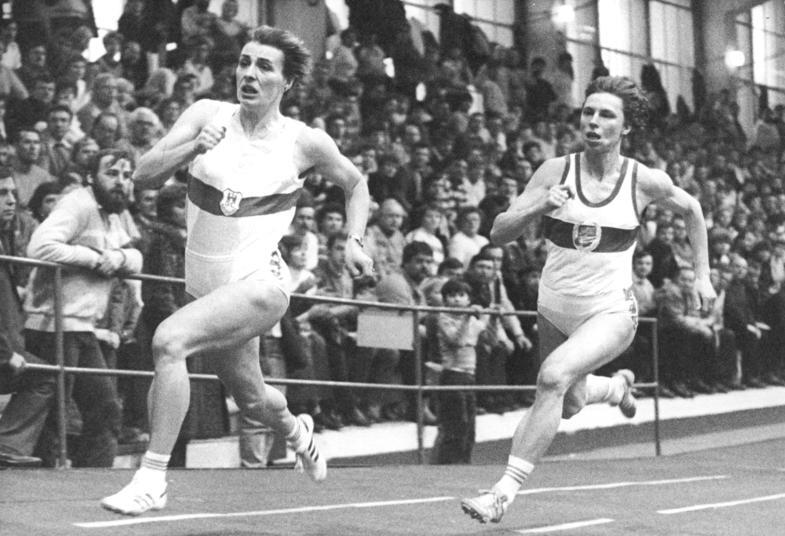
East German women, like Kirsten Emmelmann and Marita Koch, hold a number of records.

Statistics are correct as of 19 August 2026

Event	Record	Name	Nation	Date	Venue	Ref.
100 m	10.73 (+2.0 m/s)	Christine Arron	France	19 August 1998	1998 Budapest	
200 m	21.71 (−0.8 m/s)	Heike Drechsler	East Germany	29 August 1986	1986 Stuttgart	
400 m	48.16 WR	Marita Koch	East Germany	8 September 1982	1982 Athens	
800 m	1:54.81	Audrey Werro	Switzerland	14 August 2026	2026 Birmingham	
1500 m	3:56.91	Tatyana Tomashova	Russia	13 August 2006	2006 Gothenburg	
5000 m	14:35.29	Nadia Battocletti	Italy	7 June 2024	2024 Rome	
10,000 m	30:01.09	Paula Radcliffe	Great Britain	6 August 2002	2002 Munich	
Half marathon	1:08:09	Karoline Bjerkeli Grøvdal	Norway	9 June 2024	2024 Rome	
Marathon	2:22:26	Alisa Vainio	Finland	16 August 2026	2026 Birmingham	
100 m hurdles	12.31 (+0.8 m/s)	Cyréna Samba-Mayela	France	8 June 2024	2024 Roma	
400 m hurdles	52.49	Femke Bol	Netherlands	11 June 2024	2024 Rome	
3000 m steeplechase	9:11.31	Luiza Gega	Albania	20 August 2022	2022 Munich	
High jump	2.03 m	Tia Hellebaut	Belgium	11 August 2006	2006 Gothenburg	
High jump	2.03 m	Venelina Veneva-Mateeva	Bulgaria	11 August 2006	2006 Gothenburg	
High jump	2.03 m	Blanka Vlašić	Croatia	1 August 2010	2010 Barcelona	
Pole vault	4.85 m	Ekaterini Stefanidi	Greece	9 August 2018	2018 Berlin	
Pole vault	4.85 m	Wilma Murto	Finland	17 August 2022	2022 Munich	
Long jump	7.30 m (+0.6 m/s)	Heike Drechsler	East Germany	28 August 1990	1990 Split	
Triple jump	15.15 m	Tatyana Lebedeva	Russia	9 August 2006	2006 Gothenburg	
Shot put	21.69 m	Vita Pavlysh	Ukraine	20 August 1998	1998 Budapest	
Discus throw	71.36 m	Diana Sachse	East Germany	28 August 1986	1986 Stuttgart	
Hammer throw	78.94 m	Anita Włodarczyk	Poland	12 August 2018	2018 Berlin	
Javelin throw	67.90 m	Christin Hussong	Germany	10 August 2018	2018 Berlin	
Heptathlon	6848 pts	Nafissatou Thiam	Belgium	8–9 June 2024	2024 Rome	
Heptathlon	100m H (wind) / High jump / Shot put / 200m (wind) / Long jump (wind) / Javelin / 800m; 13.74 (−0.1 m/s) / 1.95 m / 15.06 m / 24.81 (+0.3 m/s) / 6.59 m (+0.1 m/s) / 53.00 m / 2:11.79					
20 km walk (road)	1:26:36	María Pérez	Spain	11 August 2018	2018 Berlin	
Half marathon walk (road)	1:30:06	María Pérez	Spain	15 August 2026	2026 Birmingham	
35 km walk (road)	2:47:00	Antigoni Ntrismpioti	Greece	16 August 2022	2022 Munich	
Marathon walk (road)	3:15:11	Sofia Fiorini	Italy	15 August 2026	2026 Birmingham	
50 km walk (road)	4:09:21	Inês Henriques	Portugal	7 August 2018	2018 Berlin	
4 × 100 m relay	41.68	Silke Möller; Katrin Krabbe; Kerstin Behrendt; Sabine Günther	East Germany	1 September 1990	1990 Split	
4 × 400 m relay	3:16.87	Kirsten Emmelmann; Sabine Busch; Petra Müller; Marita Koch	East Germany	31 August 1986	1986 Stuttgart	

=== Heptathlon disciplines ===
Event	Record	Athlete	Nation	Date	Championships	Place	Ref.
100 m hurdles	12.89	Sabine Möbius	East Germany	6 September 1982	1982 Championships	Athens, Greece	
High jump	1.98 m	Nafissatou Thiam	Belgium	17 August 2022	2022 Championships	Munich, Germany	
Shot put	17.95 m (Note: record set during pentathlon competition)	Beatrix Philipp	West Germany	2 September 1978	1978 Championships	Prague, Czechoslovakia	
200 m	22.88 (+1.5 m/s)	Katarina Johnson-Thompson	Great Britain	9 August 2018	2018 Championships	Berlin, Germany	
Long jump	6.84 m (−0.3 m/s)	Annik Kälin	Switzerland	8 June 2024	2024 Championships	Rome, Italy	
Javelin throw	57.91 m	Nafissatou Thiam	Belgium	10 August 2018	2018 Championships	Berlin, Germany	
800 m	2:02.75	Irina Belova	Soviet Union	31 August 1990	1990 Championships	Split, Croatia	

== Mixed ==
Event	Record	Athlete	Nation	Date	Venue	Ref.
4 × 100 m relay	39.97	Jeremiah Azu; Dina Asher-Smith; Zharnel Hughes; Amy Hunt	Great Britain	16 August 2026	2026 Birmingham	
4 × 400 m relay	3:09.62	Karsten Warholm; Amalie Iuel; Andreas Ofstad Kulseng; Henriette Jæger	Norway	10 August 2026	2026 Birmingham	

== Records in defunct events ==
=== Men's events ===
Event	Record	Name	Nation	Date	Venue	Ref.
10,000 m walk (track)	45:01.8	Josef Doležal	Czechoslovakia	23 August 1954	1954 Berne	
Javelin throw (Old design)	91.52 m	Jānis Lūsis	Soviet Union	19 September 1969	1969 Athens	

=== Women's events ===
Event	Record	Name	Nation	Date	Venue	Ref.
3000 m	8:30.28	Svetlana Ulmasova	Soviet Union	9 September 1982	1982 Athens	
10 km walk (road)	42:37	Sari Essayah	Finland	9 August 1994	1994 Helsinki	
80 m hurdles	10.6	Teresa Ciepły	Poland	16 September 1962	1962 Belgrade	
Javelin throw (Old design)	77.44 m	Fatima Whitbread	Great Britain	28 August 1986	1986 Stuttgart	
Pentathlon	5299 pts	Heide Rosendahl	West Germany	13–14 August 1971	1971 Helsinki	

== Statistics ==
=== Totals ===
Championship records by year
Edition	No. set
1938	20
1946	12
1950	19
1954	27
1958	31
1962	28
1966	23
1969	24
1971	26
1974	26
1978	29
1982	27
1986	?
1990	?
1994	?
1998	?
2002	?
2006	10
2010	8
2012	0
2014	3
2016	1
2018	10
2022	8
2024	15

Record holders by country
Nation	Male	Female	Total
(United Kingdom)	9	2	11
(East Germany)	1	6	7
(France)	2	2	4
(Russia)	1	2	3
(Spain)	2	1	3
(Greece)	1	2	3
(Belgium)	1	2	3
(Soviet Union)	1	1	2
(Bulgaria)	0	2	2
(Switzerland)	2	0	2
(Portugal)	0	2	2
(Norway)	2	0	2
(Finland)	1	1	2
(Netherlands)	0	2	2
(Germany)	0	1	1
(Poland)	0	1	1
(Turkey)	1	0	1
(Italy)	1	0	1
(Sweden)	1	0	1
(Croatia)	0	1	1
(Ukraine)	0	1	1
(Albania)	0	1	1

=== World records ===
Year	Athlete	Country	Gender	Event	Mark
1934	Matti Järvinen	Finland	Men	Javelin throw	76.66 m
1938	Claudia Testoni	Italy	Women	80 m hurdles	11.6 sec
1954	Vladimir Kuts	Soviet Union	Men	5000 metres	13:56.6 min
1954	Sándor Rozsnyói	Hungary	Men	3000 m steeplechase	8:49.6 min
1954	Mikhail Krivonosov	Soviet Union	Men	Hammer throw	63.34 m
1958	Sergei Popov	Soviet Union	Men	Marathon	2:15:17 hrs
1962	Salvatore Morale	Italy	Men	400 m hurdles	49.2 sec
1962	Maria Itkina	Soviet Union	Women	400 metres	53.4 sec
1962	Tamara Press	Soviet Union	Women	Shot put	18.55 m
1969	Nicole Duclos	France	Women	400 metres	51.7 sec (51.72)
1969	Colette Besson	France	Women	400 metres	51.7 sec (51.74)
1969	Jaroslava Jehličková	Czechoslovakia	Women	1500 metres	4:10.77 min
1969	Rosemary Stirling; Pat Lowe; Janet Simpson; Lillian Board	Great Britain	Women	4×400 metres relay	3:30.8 min (3:30.82)
1969	Bernadette Martin; Nicole Duclos; Eliane Jacq; Colette Besson	France	Women	4×400 metres relay	3:30.8 min (3:30.85)
1969	Nadezhda Chizhova	Soviet Union	Women	Shot put	20.10 m
1969	Nadezhda Chizhova	Soviet Union	Women	Shot put	20.43 m
1971	Karin Burneleit	East Germany	Women	1500 metres	4:09.62 min
1971	Rita Kühne; Ingelore Lohse; Helga Seidler; Monika Zehrt	East Germany	Women	4×400 metres relay	3:29.3 min
1971	Faina Melnik	Soviet Union	Men	Discus throw	64.22 m
1974	Riitta Salin	Finland	Women	400 metres	50.14 sec
1974	Doris Maletzki; Renate Stecher; Christina Heinich; Bärbel Eckert	East Germany	Women	4×100 metres relay	42.51 sec
1974	Rosemarie Witschas	East Germany	Women	High jump	1.95 m
1974	Ruth Fuchs	East Germany	Women	Javelin throw	67.22 m
1978	Roland Wieser	East Germany	Men	20 kilometres walk	1:23:11.5 hrs
1978	Marita Koch	East Germany	Women	400 metres	48.94 sec
1978	Tatyana Zelentsova	Soviet Union	Women	400 m hurdles	54.89 sec
1978	Sara Simeoni	Italy	Women	High jump	2.01 m
1982	Daley Thompson	Great Britain	Men	Decathlon	8743 pts
1982	Marita Koch	East Germany	Women	400 metres	48.16 sec
1982	Kirsten Siemon; Sabine Busch; Dagmar Rübsam; Marita Koch	East Germany	Women	4×400 metres relay	3:19.04 min
1982	Ulrike Meyfarth	West Germany	Women	High jump	2.02 m
1986	Yuriy Sedykh	Soviet Union	Men	Hammer throw	86.74 m
1986	Heike Daute-Drechsler	East Germany	Women	200 metres	21.71 sec
1986	Marina Makeyeva-Stepanova	Soviet Union	Women	400 m hurdles	53.32 sec
1986	Fatima Whitbread	Great Britain	Women	Javelin throw	77.44 m
1990	Max Morinière; Daniel Sangouma; Jean-Charles Trouabal; Bruno Marie-Rose	France	Men	4×100 metres relay	37.79 sec
2002	Robert Korzeniowski	Poland	Men	50 kilometres walk	3:36:39 hrs
