= Athletics at the 1972 Summer Olympics – Women's 400 metres =

Women's 400 metres at the Games of the XX Olympiad
- Venue: Olympic Stadium, Munich, West Germany
- Date: 2 September 1972 & 7 September 1972
- Competitors: 49 from 29 nations
- Winning time: 51.08 OR

Medalists
1st place, gold medalist(s)		Monika Zehrt; East Germany
2nd place, silver medalist(s)		Rita Wilden; West Germany
3rd place, bronze medalist(s)		Kathy Hammond; United States

These are the official results of the Women's 400 metres event at the 1972 Summer Olympics in Munich. The competition was held on 2 & 7 of September. The favorite coming into the Olympics was Monika Zehrt of East Germany who equaled the world record in the previous July. The other world record holder was Marilyn Neufville of Jamaica, who was also favored to win, but was injured and unable to compete. This left the field open to challenge the world record holder for the top prize.

== Heats ==
The top four runners in each heat (blue) and the next four fastest (pink), advanced to the quarterfinal round.

=== Heat 1 ===
Rank	Athlete	Nation	Lane	Time	Notes
1	Charlene Rendina	Australia	7	51.94	OR
2	Rita Wilden	West Germany	4	51.97	
3	Mable Fergerson	United States	1	52.05	
4	Judith Ayaa	Uganda	2	52.85	
5	Karoline Käfer	Austria	3	53.60	
6	Asunción Acosta	Cuba	5	54.52	
7	Barbara Bishop	Barbados	6	56.35	

=== Heat 2 ===
Rank	Athlete	Nation	Lane	Time
1	Kathy Hammond	United States	1	53.45
2	Jannette Roscoe	Great Britain	7	53.67
3	Marika Eklund	Finland	3	53.81
4	Natalya Pechonkina	Soviet Union	2	53.81
5	Krystyna Kacperczyk	Poland	4	53.85
6	Junaidah Aman	Malaysia	5	57.36
-	Christiane Casapicola	Austria	6	DNS

=== Heat 3 ===
Rank	Athlete	Nation	Lane	Time
1	Monika Zehrt	East Germany	3	52.49
2	Mona-Lisa Strandvall	Finland	5	52.85
3	Trudy Ruth	Netherlands	2	53.16
4	Tekla Chemabwai	Kenya	4	53.38
5	Debra Edwards	United States	1	54.43
6	Maria Sykora	Austria	7	54.46
7	Josefa Vicent	Uruguay	6	55.33

=== Heat 4 ===
Rank	Athlete	Nation	Lane	Time
1	Nicole Duclos	France	4	52.69
2	Györgyi Balogh	Hungary	7	52.75
3	Nadezhda Kolesnikova	Soviet Union	2	53.20
4	Karin Wallgren	Sweden	5	53.70
5	Bożena Zientarska	Poland	3	54.20
6	Ruth Williams	Jamaica	6	55.72
7	Aida Mantawel	Philippines	1	57.91

=== Heat 5 ===
Rank	Athlete	Nation	Lane	Time
1	Yvonne Saunders	Jamaica	1	52.38
2	Helga Seidler	East Germany	6	52.79
3	Colette Besson	France	5	53.41
4	Allison Ross-Edwards	Australia	4	53.48
5	Donata Govoni	Italy	2	53.98
6	Irén Orosz	Hungary	3	54.83
7	Arda Kalpakian	Lebanon	7	1:05.18

=== Heat 6 ===
Rank	Athlete	Nation	Lane	Time
1	Christel Frese	West Germany	5	52.89
2	Dagmar Käsling	East Germany	6	52.99
3	Aurelia Pentón	Cuba	2	53.25
4	Olga Syrovatskaya	Soviet Union	7	53.62
5	Janet Simpson	Great Britain	8	54.13
6	Joyce Sadowick	Canada	3	54.59
7	Elsy Rivas	Colombia	1	56.33
8	Kamaljit Sandhu	India	4	57.74

=== Heat 7 ===
Rank	Athlete	Nation	Lane	Time
1	Carmen Trustée	Cuba	7	52.80
2	Penny Hunt	New Zealand	5	52.82
3	Danuta Piecyk	Poland	6	53.08
4	Verona Bernard	Great Britain	4	53.31
5	Anette Rückes	West Germany	3	53.92
6	Vreni Leiser	Switzerland	1	54.65
7	Grace Muneene	Zambia	2	57.71

== Quarterfinals ==
The top four runners in each heat advanced to the semifinal round.

=== Quarterfinal 1 ===
Rank	Athlete	Nation	Lane	Time
1	Charlene Rendina	Australia	5	51.96
2	Helga Seidler	East Germany	3	51.97
3	Nadezhda Kolesnikova	Soviet Union	1	52.30
4	Trudy Ruth	Netherlands	8	52.45
5	Karoline Käfer	Austria	6	52.82
6	Jannette Roscoe	Great Britain	7	53.01
7	Anette Rückes	West Germany	2	53.22
-	Carmen Trustée	Cuba	4	DNS

=== Quarterfinal 2 ===
Rank	Athlete	Nation	Lane	Time
1	Yvonne Saunders	Jamaica	8	52.13
2	Monika Zehrt	East Germany	2	52.33
3	Judith Ayaa	Uganda	7	52.68
4	Christel Frese	West Germany	1	53.01
5	Colette Besson	France	3	53.39
6	Marika Eklund	Finland	6	53.50
7	Tekla Chemabwai	Kenya	5	53.54
8	Natalya Pechonkina	Soviet Union	4	54.58

=== Quarterfinal 3 ===
Rank	Athlete	Nation	Lane	Time	Notes
1	Györgyi Balogh	Hungary	2	51.71	OR
2	Rita Wilden	West Germany	8	51.91	
3	Aurelia Pentón	Cuba	6	52.02	
4	Kathy Hammond	United States	5	52.44	
5	Danuta Piecyk	Poland	4	52.62	
6	Penny Hunt	New Zealand	1	52.66	
7	Olga Syrovatskaya	Soviet Union	7	53.42	
8	Donata Govoni	Italy	3	53.78	

=== Quarterfinal 4 ===
Rank	Athlete	Nation	Lane	Time
1	Dagmar Käsling	East Germany	1	52.33
2	Mona-Lisa Strandvall	Finland	3	52.53
3	Mable Fergerson	United States	7	52.93
4	Nicole Duclos	France	8	52.96
5	Verona Bernard	Great Britain	2	53.29
6	Allison Ross-Edwards	Australia	5	53.60
7	Karin Wallgren	Sweden	6	53.87
8	Krystyna Kacperczyk	Poland	4	54.39

== Semifinals ==
Top four in each heat advanced to the final round.

=== Semifinal 1 ===
Rank	Athlete	Nation	Lane	Time	Notes
1	Helga Seidler	East Germany	4	51.68	OR
2	Dagmar Käsling	East Germany	8	51.73	
3	Györgyi Balogh	Hungary	5	51.90	
4	Kathy Hammond	United States	1	51.92	
5	Aurelia Pentón	Cuba	6	52.15	
6	Mona-Lisa Strandvall	Finland	7	52.23	
7	Judith Ayaa	Uganda	2	52.91	
-	Christel Frese	West Germany	3	DNF	

=== Semifinal 2 ===
Rank	Athlete	Nation	Lane	Time	Notes
1	Monika Zehrt	East Germany	5	51.47	OR
2	Rita Wilden	West Germany	3	51.76	
3	Charlene Rendina	Australia	8	51.90	
4	Mable Fergerson	United States	6	51.91	
5	Yvonne Saunders	Jamaica	2	51.93	
6	Nicole Duclos	France	4	52.18	
7	Nadezhda Kolesnikova	Soviet Union	7	52.29	
8	Trudy Ruth	Netherlands	1	53.02	

== Final ==
Rank	Athlete	Nation	Lane	Time	Notes
1st place, gold medalist(s)	Monika Zehrt	East Germany	7	51.08	OR
2nd place, silver medalist(s)	Rita Wilden	West Germany	4	51.21	
3rd place, bronze medalist(s)	Kathy Hammond	United States	5	51.64	
4	Helga Seidler	East Germany	6	51.86	
5	Mable Fergerson	United States	3	51.96	
6	Charlene Rendina	Australia	8	51.99	
7	Dagmar Käsling	East Germany	1	52.19	
8	Györgyi Balogh	Hungary	2	52.39	

Key: OR = Olympic record; DNS = did not start; DNF = did not finish
