= 1969 European Indoor Games – Women's 400 metres =

The women's 400 metres event at the 1969 European Indoor Games was held on 8 March in Belgrade.

== Medalists ==
Gold	Silver	Bronze
Colette Besson; France	Christel Frese; West Germany	Rosemary Stirling; Great Britain

== Results ==
=== Heats ===
First 2 from each heat (Q) qualified directly for the final.

Rank	Heat	Name	Nationality	Time	Notes
1	1	Colette Besson	France	54.2	Q
2	1	Christel Frese	West Germany	54.9	Q
3	1	Libuše Macounová	Czechoslovakia	55.0	
4	1	Elisabeth Randerz	Sweden	56.7	
1	2	Rosemary Stirling	Great Britain	55.5	Q
2	2	Raisa Nikanorova	Soviet Union	56.1	Q
3	2	Ika Maričić	Yugoslavia	58.0	
4	2	Maria Sykora	Austria	58.9	

=== Final ===
Rank	Name	Nationality	Time	Notes
1st place, gold medalist(s)	Colette Besson	France	54.0	WB
2nd place, silver medalist(s)	Christel Frese	West Germany	54.8	
3rd place, bronze medalist(s)	Rosemary Stirling	Great Britain	54.8	
	Raisa Nikanorova	Soviet Union	DNF	
