= 1971 European Athletics Indoor Championships – Women's 400 metres =

The women's 400 metres event at the 1971 European Athletics Indoor Championships was held on 13 and 14 March in Sofia.

== Medalists ==
Gold	Silver	Bronze
Vera Popkova; Soviet Union	Inge Bödding; West Germany	Maria Sykora; Austria

== Results ==
=== Heats ===
Held on 13 March

First 2 from each heat (Q) qualified directly for the semifinals.

Rank	Heat	Name	Nationality	Time	Notes
1	1	Inge Bödding	West Germany	55.5	Q
2	1	Elisabeth Randerz	Sweden	55.5	Q
3	1	Nadezhda Kolesnikova	Soviet Union	56.0	
4	1	Francine van Assche	Belgium	57.5	
1	2	Gisela Ellenberger	West Germany	56.5	Q
2	2	Uschi Meyer	Switzerland	56.6	Q, NR
3	2	Éliane Jacq	France	58.0	
1	3	Vera Popkova	Soviet Union	54.7	Q
2	3	Maria Sykora	Austria	55.3	Q, NR
3	3	Stefka Yordanova	Bulgaria	55.6	
1	4	Svetla Zlateva	Bulgaria	54.1	Q
2	4	Gisela Ahlemeyer	West Germany	55.5	Q
3	4	Chantal Leclerc	France	55.5	
4	4	Lyubov Finogenova	Soviet Union	55.8	

=== Semifinals ===
Held on 13 March

First 2 from each heat (Q) qualified directly for the final.

Rank	Heat	Name	Nationality	Time	Notes
1	1	Svetla Zlateva	Bulgaria	54.5	Q
2	1	Inge Bödding	West Germany	54.8	Q
3	1	Uschi Meyer	Switzerland	55.5	NR
4	1	Gisela Ahlemeyer	West Germany	56.3	
1	2	Vera Popkova	Soviet Union	54.8	Q
2	2	Maria Sykora	Austria	55.2	Q, NR
3	2	Gisela Ellenberger	West Germany	56.0	
4	2	Elisabeth Randerz	Sweden	57.3	

=== Final ===
Held on 14 March

Rank	Name	Nationality	Time	Notes
1st place, gold medalist(s)	Vera Popkova	Soviet Union	53.7	
2nd place, silver medalist(s)	Inge Bödding	West Germany	54.3	
3rd place, bronze medalist(s)	Maria Sykora	Austria	54.4	NR
4	Svetla Zlateva	Bulgaria	54.6	
