= 1969 European Athletics Championships – Women's 400 metres =

Women's 400 metres at the European Athletics Championships
- Venue: Georgios Karaiskakis Stadium
- Location: Athens, Greece
- Dates: 16, 17, and 18 September 1969
- Competitors: 20 from 12 nations
- Winning time: 51.7 s WR

Medalists
| gold medal | Nicole Duclos | France |
| silver medal | Colette Besson | France |
| bronze medal | Maria Sykora | Austria |

The women's 400 metres at the 1969 European Athletics Championships was held in Athens, Greece, at Georgios Karaiskakis Stadium on 16, 17, and 18 September 1969.

== Results ==
=== Heats ===
16 September

==== Heat 1 ====
| Rank | Name | Nationality | Time | Notes |
|---|---|---|---|---|
| 1 | Nicole Duclos | France | 53.2 | Q |
| 2 | Karin Lundgren | Sweden | 54.5 | Q |
| 3 | Donata Govoni | Italy | 54.6 | Q |
| 4 | Rosemary Stirling | Great Britain | 54.7 | Q |
| 5 | Anna Dundare | Soviet Union | 55.2 | |

==== Heat 2 ====
| Rank | Name | Nationality | Time | Notes |
|---|---|---|---|---|
| 1 | Colette Besson | France | 52.1 | CR Q |
| 2 | Maria Sykora | Austria | 53.6 | NR Q |
| 3 | Janet Simpson | Great Britain | 54.1 | Q |
| 4 | Hannelore Middecke | East Germany | 54.2 | Q |
| 5 | Elisabeth Randerz | Sweden | 55.5 | |
| 6 | Eeva Haimi | Finland | 55.8 | |

==== Heat 3 ====
| Rank | Name | Nationality | Time | Notes |
|---|---|---|---|---|
| 1 | Jennifer Pawsey | Great Britain | 54.8 | Q |
| 2 | Eliane Jacq | France | 54.9 | Q |
| 3 | Olga Klein | Soviet Union | 55.0 | Q |
| 4 | Krystyna Hryniewicka | Poland | 55.4 | Q |
| 5 | Birgitte Jennes | Denmark | 55.5 | |

==== Heat 4 ====
| Rank | Name | Nationality | Time | Notes |
|---|---|---|---|---|
| 1 | Taysiya Kovalevskaya | Soviet Union | 55.0 | Q |
| 2 | Berit Berthelsen | Norway | 55.2 | Q |
| 3 | Uschi Meyer | Switzerland | 55.5 | Q |
| 4 | Elżbieta Skowrońska | Poland | 55.6 | Q |

=== Semi-finals ===
17 September

==== Semi-final 1 ====
| Rank | Name | Nationality | Time | Notes |
|---|---|---|---|---|
| 1 | Colette Besson | France | 52.2 | Q |
| 2 | Hannelore Middecke | East Germany | 53.3 | NR Q |
| 3 | Janet Simpson | Great Britain | 53.6 | Q |
| 4 | Donata Govoni | Italy | 53.7 | NR Q |
| 5 | Taysiya Kovalevskaya | Soviet Union | 54.1 | |
| 6 | Jennifer Pawsey | Great Britain | 54.8 | |
| 7 | Elżbieta Skowrońska | Poland | 55.3 | |
| | Berit Berthelsen | Norway | DNS | |

==== Semi-final 2 ====
| Rank | Name | Nationality | Time | Notes |
|---|---|---|---|---|
| 1 | Maria Sykora | Austria | 53.2 | NR Q |
| 2 | Nicole Duclos | France | 53.2 | Q |
| 3 | Karin Lundgren | Sweden | 54.2 | Q |
| 4 | Rosemary Stirling | Great Britain | 54.3 | Q |
| 5 | Krystyna Hryniewicka | Poland | 54.7 | |
| 6 | Eliane Jacq | France | 54.7 | |
| 7 | Uschi Meyer | Switzerland | 54.9 | |
| 8 | Olga Klein | Soviet Union | 56.3 | |

=== Final ===
18 September

| Rank | Name | Nationality | Time | Notes |
|---|---|---|---|---|
| 1st place, gold medalist(s) | Nicole Duclos | France | 51.7 (51.72) | WR |
| 2nd place, silver medalist(s) | Colette Besson | France | 51.7 (51.74) | WR |
| 3rd place, bronze medalist(s) | Maria Sykora | Austria | 53.0 | NR |
| 4 | Hannelore Middecke | East Germany | 53.1 | NR |
| 5 | Karin Lundgren | Sweden | 53.4 | |
| 6 | Donata Govoni | Italy | 53.6 | |
| 7 | Janet Simpson | Great Britain | 53.8 | |
| 8 | Rosemary Stirling | Great Britain | 54.6 | |
