= 1971 European Athletics Indoor Championships – Women's 800 metres =

The women's 800 metres event at the 1971 European Athletics Indoor Championships was held on 13 and 14 March in Sofia.

== Medalists ==
| Gold | Silver | Bronze |
|---|---|---|
| Hildegard Falck; West Germany | Ileana Silai; Romania | Rosemary Stirling; Great Britain |

== Results ==
=== Heats ===
Held on 13 March

First 2 from each heat (Q) qualified directly for the final.

| Rank | Heat | Name | Nationality | Time | Notes |
|---|---|---|---|---|---|
| 1 | 1 | Ileana Silai | Romania | 2:06.0 | Q, NR |
| 2 | 1 | Hildegard Falck | West Germany | 2:06.1 | Q |
| 3 | 1 | Claire Walsh | Ireland | 2:07.4 | |
| 4 | 1 | Magdolna Kulcsár | Hungary | 2:08.4 | |
| 1 | 2 | Donata Govoni | Italy | 2:09.6 | Q |
| 2 | 2 | Colette Besson | France | 2:10.2 | Q |
| 3 | 2 | Rosemarie Klute | West Germany | 2:10.6 | |
| 4 | 2 | Marie Otova | Czechoslovakia | 2:11.0 | |
| 5 | 2 | Dzhena Bineva | Bulgaria | 2:12.1 | |
| 1 | 3 | Nadezhda Kolesnikova | Soviet Union | 2:07.9 | Q |
| 2 | 3 | Rosemary Stirling | Great Britain | 2:08.8 | Q |
| 3 | 3 | María Fuentes | Spain | 2:10.6 | |
| 4 | 3 | Vesela Tasheva | Bulgaria | 2:11.1 | |
| 5 | 3 | Hannelore Heyn | West Germany | 2:12.7 | |

=== Final ===
Held on 14 March

| Rank | Name | Nationality | Time | Notes |
|---|---|---|---|---|
| 1st place, gold medalist(s) | Hildegard Falck | West Germany | 2:06.1 | |
| 2nd place, silver medalist(s) | Ileana Silai | Romania | 2:06.5 | |
| 3rd place, bronze medalist(s) | Rosemary Stirling | Great Britain | 2:06.6 | |
| 4 | Colette Besson | France | 2:07.5 | |
| 5 | Nadezhda Kolesnikova | Soviet Union | 2:08.1 | |
| 6 | Donata Govoni | Italy | 2:09.2 | |
