= 1972 European Athletics Indoor Championships – Women's 400 metres =

The women's 400 metres event at the 1972 European Athletics Indoor Championships was held on 11 and 12 March in Grenoble.

== Medalists ==
Gold	Silver	Bronze
Christel Frese; West Germany	Inge Bödding; West Germany	Erika Weinstein; West Germany

== Results ==
=== Heats ===
First 2 from each heat (Q) and the next 2 fastest (q) qualified for the semifinals.

Held on 11 March

Rank	Heat	Name	Nationality	Time	Notes
1	1	Colette Besson	France	54.74	Q
2	2	Christel Frese	West Germany	54.83	Q
3	1	Erika Weinstein	West Germany	54.90	Q
4	2	Verona Bernard	Great Britain	55.11	Q
5	1	Margaretha Larsson	Sweden	55.43	q
6	2	Bernadette Martin	France	55.88	q
7	3	Lyubov Zavyalova	Soviet Union	55.96	Q
8	3	Inge Bödding	West Germany	55.96	Q
9	3	Birgitte Jennes	Denmark	57.37	

=== Semifinals ===
First 2 from each heat (Q) qualified directly for the final.

Held on 11 March

Rank	Heat	Name	Nationality	Time	Notes
1	2	Christel Frese	West Germany	54.57	Q
2	1	Colette Besson	France	54.61	Q
3	2	Inge Bödding	West Germany	54.85	Q
4	1	Erika Weinstein	West Germany	55.06	Q
5	1	Lyubov Zavyalova	Soviet Union	55.12	
6	1	Verona Bernard	Great Britain	55.25	
7	2	Margaretha Larsson	Sweden	55.75	
8	2	Bernadette Martin	France	56.75	

=== Final ===
Held on 12 March

Rank	Name	Nationality	Time	Notes
1st place, gold medalist(s)	Christel Frese	West Germany	53.36	
2nd place, silver medalist(s)	Inge Bödding	West Germany	54.60	
3rd place, bronze medalist(s)	Erika Weinstein	West Germany	54.73	
4	Colette Besson	France	55.64	
