= Athletics at the 1973 Summer Universiade – Women's 400 metres =

The women's 400 metres event at the 1973 Summer Universiade was held at the Central Lenin Stadium in Moscow on 16, 17 and 18 August.

== Medalists ==
| Gold | Silver | Bronze |
|---|---|---|
| Nadezhda Kolesnikova; Soviet Union | Judy Canty; Australia | Carmen Trustée; Cuba |

== Results ==
=== Heats ===
| Rank | Heat | Athlete | Nationality | Time | Notes |
|---|---|---|---|---|---|
| 1 | 1 | Inta Kļimoviča | Soviet Union | 54.82 | Q |
| 2 | 1 | Christiane Casapicola | Austria | 55.17 | Q |
| 3 | 1 | Maoper West | United States | 55.61 | Q |
| 1 | 2 | Pirjo Wilmi | Finland | 54.98 | Q |
| 2 | 2 | Brenda Walsh | Canada | 55.28 | Q |
| 3 | 2 | Jarvis Scott | United States | 55.95 | Q |
| 4 | 2 | Marjan Burggraaf | Netherlands | 56.70 | |
| 1 | 3 | Stefka Yordanova | Bulgaria | 53.67 | Q |
| 2 | 3 | Asunción Acosta | Cuba | 54.07 | Q |
| 3 | 3 | Vreni Leiser | Switzerland | 54.40 | Q |
| 4 | 3 | Joyce Sadowick | Canada | 54.75 | q |
| 5 | 3 | Zina Boniolo | Italy | 56.0 | |
| 1 | 4 | Carmen Trustée | Cuba | 53.74 | Q |
| 2 | 4 | Bernadette Dargent | France | 54.32 | Q |
| 3 | 4 | Jozefína Čerchlanová | Czechoslovakia | 54.78 | Q |
| 4 | 4 | Anna Bełtowska | Poland | 55.39 | PB |
| 1 | 5 | Nadezhda Kolesnikova | Soviet Union | 52.50 | Q |
| 2 | 5 | Judy Canty | Australia | 53.73 | Q |
| 3 | 5 | Dawn Webster | Great Britain | 55.54 | Q |
| 4 | 5 | Chantal Jouvhomme | France | 56.11 | |
| 5 | 5 | Brigitte Baégné | Congo | 1:00.4 | |

=== Semifinals ===
| Rank | Heat | Athlete | Nationality | Time | Notes |
|---|---|---|---|---|---|
| 1 | 1 | Judy Canty | Australia | 53.27 | Q |
| 2 | 1 | Carmen Trustée | Cuba | 53.4 | Q |
| 3 | 1 | Joyce Sadowick | Canada | 53.53 | Q |
| 4 | 1 | Pirjo Wilmi | Finland | 53.8 | Q |
| 5 | 1 | Asunción Acosta | Cuba | 53.8 | |
| 6 | 1 | Christiane Casapicola | Austria | 54.2 | |
| 7 | 1 | Dawn Webster | Great Britain | 54.8 | |
| 8 | 1 | Maoper West | United States | 56.7 | |
| 1 | 2 | Nadezhda Kolesnikova | Soviet Union | 52.6 | Q |
| 2 | 2 | Inta Kļimoviča | Soviet Union | 53.51 | Q |
| 3 | 2 | Stefka Yordanova | Bulgaria | 53.59 | Q |
| 4 | 2 | Jozefína Čerchlanová | Czechoslovakia | 53.71 | Q |
| 5 | 2 | Vreni Leiser | Switzerland | 54.4 | |
| 6 | 2 | Brenda Walsh | Canada | 54.4 | |
| 7 | 2 | Bernadette Dargent | France | 54.68 | |
| 8 | 2 | Jarvis Scott | United States | 55.8 | |

=== Final ===
| Rank | Athlete | Nationality | Time | Notes |
|---|---|---|---|---|
| 1st place, gold medalist(s) | Nadezhda Kolesnikova | Soviet Union | 52.04 | |
| 2nd place, silver medalist(s) | Judy Canty | Australia | 52.82 | |
| 3rd place, bronze medalist(s) | Carmen Trustée | Cuba | 53.44 | |
| 4 | Pirjo Wilmi | Finland | 53.82 | |
| 5 | Joyce Sadowick | Canada | 54.0 | |
| 6 | Jozefína Čerchlanová | Czechoslovakia | 54.12 | |
| 7 | Inta Kļimoviča | Soviet Union | 54.33 | |
| | Stefka Yordanova | Bulgaria | DNS | |
