= Ingelore Lohse =

German sprinter

Medal record

Women's athletics

Representing East Germany

European Championships
Gold medal – first place	1971 Helsinki	4×400 m relay
Bronze medal – third place	1971 Helsinki	400 m

Ingelore Lohse, née Ingelore Müller, (11 May 1945) is a German athlete who competed in the 400 metres and 4 × 400 metres relay.

She finished fifth in the 4 × 400 metres relay at the 1969 European Championships. The relay team consisted of her, Waltraud Birnbaum, Roswitha Becker and Hannelore Middecke.

At the 1971 European Championships, Lohse won the bronze medal in the individual 400 metres behind East German Helga Seidler and West German Inge Bödding. Lohse then won a gold medal in the 4 × 400 metres relay with Rita Kuhne, Helga Seidler, Monika Zehrt. Their time of 3:29.3 minutes was a new world record.

At the East German championships in the 400 metres, she won a bronze medal in 1967 and silver medals in 1969 and 1971. She also took one bronze medal indoors, in 1968. She represented the club SC Chemie Halle.

In her professional life, she became a photographer, both in the press as well as for exhibitions.
