= Chibás =

Chibás is a surname. Notable people with the surname include:

- Eduardo Chibás (1907–1951), Cuban politician
- Marcela Chibás (born 1951), Cuban sprinter
- Raúl Chibás (1916–2002), Cuban politician and military officer, brother of Eduardo
