= 1971 European Athletics Indoor Championships – Women's 4 × 400 metres relay =

The women's 4 × 400 metres relay event at the 1971 European Athletics Indoor Championships was held on 14 March in Sofia. Each athlete ran two laps of the 200 metres track.

== Results ==
Rank	Nation	Competitors	Time	Notes
1st place, gold medalist(s)	Soviet Union	Lyubov Finogenova; Galina Kamardina; Vera Popkova; Lyudmila Aksyonova	3:36.6	WB
2nd place, silver medalist(s)	West Germany	Gisela Ahlemeyer; Gisela Ellenberger; Anette Rückes; Christa Czekay	3:39.6	
3rd place, bronze medalist(s)	Bulgaria	Svetla Slateva; Stefka Yordanova; Dzhena Bineva; Tonka Petrova	3:47.8	NR
