= Athletics at the 1970 Summer Universiade – Women's 400 metres =

The women's 400 metres event at the 1970 Summer Universiade was held at the Stadio Comunale in Turin on 2 and 4 September 1970.

== Medalists ==
| Gold | Silver | Bronze |
|---|---|---|
| Maria Sykora; Austria | Carmen Trustée; Cuba | Aurelia Pentón; Cuba |

== Results ==
=== Heats ===
| Rank | Heat | Athlete | Nationality | Time | Notes |
|---|---|---|---|---|---|
| 1 | 1 | Carmen Trustée | Cuba | 55.2 | Q |
| 2 | 1 | Kamaljit Sandhu | India | 57.7 | Q |
| 3 | 1 | Natalya Pechonkina | Soviet Union | 59.3 | |
| 4 | 1 | Elisabeth Fritscher | Austria | 1:00.0 | |
| 1 | 2 | Maria Sykora | Austria | 53.9 | Q |
| 2 | 2 | Marie-Claude Druel | France | 54.7 | Q |
| 3 | 2 | Irenice Rodrigues | Brazil | 54.7 | q |
| 4 | 2 | Éva Pusztai | Hungary | 55.8 | |
| 5 | 2 | Silvana Zangirolami | Italy | 56.0 | |
| 1 | 3 | Aurelia Pentón | Cuba | 54.4 | Q |
| 2 | 3 | Gale Fitzgerald | United States | 55.1 | Q |
| 3 | 3 | Hanna Kowal | Poland | 55.2 | q |
| 4 | 3 | Silvia Chersoni | Italy | 56.2 | |
| 5 | 3 | Libuše Macounová | Czechoslovakia | 56.4 | |

=== Final ===
| Rank | Name | Nationality | Time | Notes |
|---|---|---|---|---|
| 1st place, gold medalist(s) | Maria Sykora | Austria | 52.8 | UR |
| 2nd place, silver medalist(s) | Carmen Trustée | Cuba | 53.5 | |
| 3rd place, bronze medalist(s) | Aurelia Pentón | Cuba | 53.8 | |
| 4 | Hanna Kowal | Poland | 54.4 | |
| 5 | Marie-Claude Druel | France | 54.4 | |
| 6 | Irenice Rodrigues | Brazil | 54.5 | |
| 7 | Gale Fitzgerald | United States | 56.5 | |
| 8 | Kamaljit Sandhu | India | 56.5 | |
