= 1970 European Athletics Indoor Championships – Women's medley relay =

The women's 200 + 400 + 600 + 800 metres medley relay event at the 1970 European Athletics Indoor Championships was held on 15 March in Vienna. The first athlete ran one lap of the 200-metre track, the second two, the third three and the anchor four, thus 10 laps or 2000 metres in total.

== Results ==
Rank	Nation	Competitors	Time	Notes
1st place, gold medalist(s)	France	Sylviane Telliez; Mireille Testanière; Colette Besson; Nicole Duclos	4:58.4	
2nd place, silver medalist(s)	West Germany	Elfgard Schittenhelm; Heidi Gerhard; Christa Merten; Jutta Haase	5:01.1	
3rd place, bronze medalist(s)	Soviet Union	Lyudmila Golomazova; Olga Klein; Nadezhda Kolesnikova; Svetlana Moshchenok	5:02.2	
4	Austria	Brigitte Ortner; Maria Sykora; Sissy Brandnegger; Monika Bouchal	5:20.8	
