= 1970 European Athletics Indoor Championships – Women's 800 metres =

The women's 800 metres event at the 1970 European Athletics Indoor Championships was held on 14 and 15 March in Vienna.

== Medalists ==
Gold	Silver	Bronze
Maria Sykora; Austria	Lyudmila Bragina; Soviet Union	Zofia Kołakowska; Poland

== Results ==
=== Heats ===
First 4 in each heat (Q) qualified directly for the final.

Rank	Heat	Name	Nationality	Time	Notes
1	1	Hildegard Janze	West Germany	2:09.9	Q
2	1	Ilja Keizer	Netherlands	2:10.5	Q
3	1	Lyudmila Bragina	Soviet Union	2:10.7	Q
4	1	Zofia Kołakowska	Poland	2:10.9	Q
5	1	Annelise Damm Olesen	Denmark	2:14.5	
1	2	Lyudmila Safronova	Soviet Union	2:12.9	Q
2	2	Maria Sykora	Austria	2:13.0	Q
3	2	María Fuentes	Spain	2:14.9	Q
4	2	Svetla Zlateva	Bulgaria	2:14.9	Q
5	2	Rosemary Stirling	Great Britain	2:16.8	
6	2	Wenche Sørum	Norway	2:18.9	

=== Final ===
Rank	Name	Nationality	Time	Notes
1st place, gold medalist(s)	Maria Sykora	Austria	2:07.0	
2nd place, silver medalist(s)	Lyudmila Bragina	Soviet Union	2:07.5	
3rd place, bronze medalist(s)	Zofia Kołakowska	Poland	2:07.6	
4	Ilja Keizer	Netherlands	2:07.7	
5	Lyudmila Safronova	Soviet Union	2:07.9	
6	Svetla Zlateva	Bulgaria	2:08.6	
7	María Fuentes	Spain	2:09.0	
8	Hildegard Janze	West Germany	2:09.5	
