= Christa Czekay =

German sprinter

Medal record

Women's athletics

Representing West Germany

European Championships
Bronze medal – third place	1969 Athens	4×400 m

European Indoor Championships
Silver medal – second place	1971 Sofia	4×400 m

Christa Czekay, née Elsler (20 March 1944 in Waldenburg – 14 June 2017) was a West German sprinter who specialized in the 200 and 400 metres.

== Biography ==
She won a bronze medal in 4 × 400 metres relay at the 1969 European Championships along with teammates Antje Gleichfeld, Inge Eckhoff and Christel Frese. She won a silver medal in the same event at the 1971 European Indoor Championships, this time with Gisela Ahlemeyer, Gisela Ellenberger and Anette Rückes.

She competed for the sports club MTV Peine during her active career.
