= Martine Duvivier =

Personal information
- Nationality: French
- Born: 4 January 1953 (age 73) Curgies
- Years active: 1970s
- Height: 1.71 m (5 ft 7 in)

Sport
- Event: 800 m
- Club: AS Anzin

Martine Duvivier (married name is Jacquemin; born 4 January 1953, at Curgies) is a former French athlete, who specialized in middle-distance running. She won two national titles in the 800 m in 1972 and 1973. Duvivier set a personal best of 2:02.2 minutes for the 800 m in 1972.

She participated in the 1972 Olympics in Munich. Eliminated in the first round of 800 m, she placed fourth in the final of 4 × 400 metres relay, alongside Colette Besson, Bernadette Martin and Nicole Duclos. The France team improved twice on this occasion the French record of the 4 × 400 m relay.

== National titles ==
- French Championships in Athletics
  - 800 m: 1972, 1973

== Personal bests ==
Event	Performance	Location	Date
400 m	53.78		1978
800 m	2:02.2		1972
