= 1973 European Athletics Indoor Championships – Women's 4 × 340 metres relay =

The women's 4 × 340 metres relay event at the 1973 European Athletics Indoor Championships was held on 11 March in Rotterdam. Each athlete ran two laps of the 170 metres track.

== Results ==
Rank	Nation	Competitors	Time	Notes
1st place, gold medalist(s)	West Germany	Dagmar Jost; Erika Weinstein; Annelie Wilden; Gisela Ellenberger	3:10.85	
2nd place, silver medalist(s)	France	Colette Besson; Chantal Jouvhomme; Chantal Leclerc; Nicole Duclos	3:11.20	
3rd place, bronze medalist(s)	Poland	Danuta Manowiecka; Marta Skrzypińska; Krystyna Kacperczyk; Danuta Piecyk	3:11.65	
