= Athletics at the 1977 Summer Universiade – Women's 200 metres =

1977 Summer Universiade Sofia

The women's 200 metres event at the 1977 Summer Universiade was held at the Vasil Levski National Stadium in Sofia on 21 and 22 August.

The winning margin was 0.01 seconds which as of 2024 remains the narrowest winning margin in the women's 200 metres at these games.

== Medalists ==
Gold	Silver	Bronze
Silvia Chivás; Cuba	Marina Sidorova; Soviet Union	Andrea Lynch; Great Britain

== Results ==
=== Heats ===
Held on 21 August

Wind:
Heat 1: -0.2 m/s, Heat 2: ? m/s, Heat 3: +0.2 m/s, Heat 4: ? m/s

Rank	Heat	Athlete	Nationality	Time	Notes
1	4	Tatyana Prorochenko	Soviet Union	23.11	Q
2	2	Marina Sidorova	Soviet Union	23.70	Q
3	4	Cornelia Schnigendiller	West Germany	23.79	Q
4	1	Maria Stoyanova	Bulgaria	23.88	Q
5	3	Silvia Chivás	Cuba	23.39	Q
6	3	Andrea Lynch	Great Britain	23.48	Q
7	3	Ewa Witkowska	Poland	23.88	Q
8	1	Bogusława Kaniecka	Poland	24.06	Q
9	4	Asunción Acosta	Cuba	24.09	Q
10	3	Marie-Pierre Philippe	France	24.11	q
11	2	Andrea Mühlbach	Austria	24.16	Q
12	2	Adriana Carli	Italy	24.30	Q
13	3	Margaret Howe	Canada	24.33	q
14	2	Galina Encheva	Bulgaria	24.39	q
15	4	Ilona Pál	Hungary	24.40	q
16	4	Margaret Stride	Canada	24.46	
17	1	Nadine Diakonoff	France	24.56	Q
18	2	Veronica Buia	Romania	24.83	
19	3	Marie Lande Mathieu	Puerto Rico	24.83	
20	1	Vilma Paris	Puerto Rico	25.34	
21	1	Carolina Rieuwpassa	Indonesia	25.73	
22	2	Alev Tanyeli	Turkey	25.95	

=== Semifinals ===
Held on 22 August

Wind:
Heat 1: ? m/s, Heat 2: +0.2 m/s

Rank	Heat	Athlete	Nationality	Time	Notes
1	2	Silvia Chivás	Cuba	23.05	Q
2	1	Marina Sidorova	Soviet Union	23.15	Q
3	1	Tatyana Prorochenko	Soviet Union	23.22	Q
4	2	Andrea Lynch	Great Britain	23.74	Q
5	2	Ewa Witkowska	Poland	23.79	Q
6	1	Maria Stoyanova	Bulgaria	23.99	Q
7	2	Marie-Pierre Philippe	France	24.06	Q
8	1	Bogusława Kaniecka	Poland	24.09	Q
9	2	Galina Encheva	Bulgaria	24.21	
10	2	Andrea Mühlbach	Austria	24.26	
11	1	Cornelia Schnigendiller	West Germany	24.35	
12	2	Ilona Pál	Hungary	24.38	
13	1	Adriana Carli	Italy	24.39	
14	1	Asunción Acosta	Cuba	24.40	
15	2	Nadine Diakonoff	France	24.68	
	1	Margaret Howe	Canada	?	

=== Final ===
Held on 22 August

Wind: -2.2 m/s

Rank	Athlete	Nationality	Time	Notes
1st place, gold medalist(s)	Silvia Chivás	Cuba	23.08	
2nd place, silver medalist(s)	Marina Sidorova	Soviet Union	23.09	
3rd place, bronze medalist(s)	Andrea Lynch	Great Britain	23.23	
4	Tatyana Prorochenko	Soviet Union	23.30	
5	Maria Stoyanova	Bulgaria	24.06	
6	Ewa Witkowska	Poland	24.12	
7	Bogusława Kaniecka	Poland	24.26	
8	Marie-Pierre Philippe	France	24.40	
