= Grace Muneene =

Zambian sprinter

Personal information
- Nationality: Zambian
- Born: 12 October 1954 (age 71)

Sport
- Sport: Sprinting
- Event: 400 metres

Grace Muneene (born 12 October 1954) is a Zambian sprinter. She competed in the women's 400 metres at the 1972 Summer Olympics.
