= Lyubov Runtso =

Soviet sprinter

Personal information
- Nationality: Soviet
- Born: 19 September 1949 (age 76) Baku, Azerbaijani SSR

Sport
- Sport: Sprinting
- Event: 4 × 400 metres relay

Lyubov Runtso (born 19 September 1949) is a Soviet sprinter. She competed in the women's 4 × 400 metres relay at the 1972 Summer Olympics.
