= Dagmar Käsling =

East German sprinter

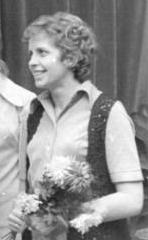
- Käsling in 1972

Personal information
- Born: 15 February 1947 (age 79) Magdeburg, Soviet occupation zone in Germany
Medal record
Women's athletics
Representing East Germany
Olympic Games
Gold medal – first place	1972 Munich	4 × 400 metres

Dagmar Käsling (later Lühnenschloß, born 15 February 1947 in Magdeburg) is a former East German athlete who competed mainly in the 400 metres.

She competed for East Germany in the 1972 Summer Olympics held in Munich, Germany in the 4 × 400 metres where she won the gold medal with her teammates Rita Kühne, Helga Seidler and Monika Zehrt.

Käsling married sprinter Gerhard Lühnenschloß. After completing her Promotion A at Magdeburg University of Education in 1980 with a thesis on The applicability of training-specific speed and endurance exercises in school sports in grades 9 and 10 and the effects on the athletic performance development of this age group and defending her Dissertation B On questions of the attitude of our pupils in grades 4 to 10 to physical education and to the athletics, gymnastics and sports games courses at the same university in 1983, she was appointed Professor Lühnenschloß, a lecturer at the Institut für Sportwissenschaften of the Otto-von-Guericke-Universität in Magdeburg, where she taught and conducted research in the field of track and field training science. In 2005, she published the book "Schnelligkeit".

== Publications ==
- with Dierks, B. (2005). Schnelligkeit. Hofmann. ISBN 3-7780-0161-2.
- with Wastl, P. (Ed.) (2008). Quo vadis olympische Leichtathletik? Probleme, Bilanzen, Perspektiven. Czwalina. ISBN 978-3-88020-512-3.
- with Hirtz, P., Dierks, B., Hotz, A., Ludwig, G. & Vilkner, H.-J. (Eds.) (2012). Reaktion. Hofmann. ISBN 978-3-7780-2541-3.
