= Asunción Acosta =

Cuban sprinter (born 1954)

Personal information
- Full name: Asunción Acosta Galano
- Born: 10 May 1954 (age 72) Frank Pais, Cuba
- Height: 1.69 m (5 ft 7 in)
- Weight: 52 kg (115 lb)

Sport
- Sport: Sprinting
- Event(s): 200 metres, 400 metres
Medal record
Representing Cuba
Pan American Games
Bronze medal – third place	1975 Mexico City	4x400m relay
Central American and Caribbean Games
Gold medal – first place	1974 Santo Domingo	4x100m relay
Silver medal – second place	1974 Santo Domingo	200m
Bronze medal – third place	1974 Santo Domingo	400m

Asunción Acosta Galano (born 10 May 1954) is a retired Cuban sprinter. She competed in the women's 400 metres at the 1972 Summer Olympics. She won a bronze medal in the 4 x 400 metres relay at the 1975 Pan American Games.

Her personal best in the 400 metres is 52.9 set in 1975.

== International competitions ==
Year	Competition	Venue	Position	Event	Notes
Representing Cuba
1972	Olympic Games	Munich, West Germany	37th (h)	400 m	54.52
1972	Olympic Games	Munich, West Germany	10th (h)	4 × 400 m relay	3:32:4
1973	Central American and Caribbean Championships	Maracaibo, Venezuela	2nd	200 m	23.9
1973	Central American and Caribbean Championships	Maracaibo, Venezuela	2nd	400 m	53.7
1973	Central American and Caribbean Championships	Maracaibo, Venezuela	1st	4 × 400 m relay	3:42.1
1973	Universiade	Moscow, Soviet Union	8th (sf)	400 m	53.8
1974	Central American and Caribbean Games	Santo Domingo, Dominican Republic	2nd	200 m	24.21
1974	Central American and Caribbean Games	Santo Domingo, Dominican Republic	3rd	400 m	53.92
1974	Central American and Caribbean Games	Santo Domingo, Dominican Republic	1st	4 × 100 m relay	44.90
1975	Pan American Games	Mexico City, Mexico	13th	200 m	24.22^{1}
1975	Pan American Games	Mexico City, Mexico	3rd	4 × 400 m relay	3:31.65
1977	Central American and Caribbean Championships	Xalapa, Mexico	1st	4 × 100 m relay	45.51
1977	Central American and Caribbean Championships	Xalapa, Mexico	1st	4 × 400 m relay	3:37.50
1977	Universiade	Sofia, Bulgaria	14th (sf)	200 m	24.40
1977	Universiade	Sofia, Bulgaria	4th	4 × 100 m relay	44.81

^{1}Did not start in the semifinals
