= Cheryl Toussaint =

American track and field athlete

Personal information
- Full name: Cheryl Renee Toussaint
- Born: December 16, 1952 (age 73) Brooklyn, New York, U.S.
Medal record
Women's athletics
Representing United States
Olympic Games
Silver medal – second place	1972 Munich	4 × 400 m relay
Pan American Games
Gold medal – first place	1971 Cali	4 × 400 m relay

Cheryl Renee Toussaint (born December 16, 1952) is an American athlete who mainly competed in the 800 metres.

She grew up in the Bedford-Stuyvesant neighborhood of Brooklyn, New York, where she attended Erasmus Hall High School, setting the indoor record in the 600-yard run in 1970, the same year she graduated from high school. She competed for the United States at the 1972 Summer Olympics held in Munich where she won the silver medal in the women's 4 × 400 metres relay with her teammates Mable Fergerson, Madeline Manning and 400 m bronze medalists Kathy Hammond.

In 1987, Toussaint founded Tousse Running Apparel, a company designing custom Team track Apparel. Working with GK Elite Sportswear, Toussaint has developed a line of track and field uniforms that can be custom designed online.

in 2015, Toussaint became the Meet Director for the Colgate Women's Games, the nation's largest track and field series for women.
