= Ulla Ekblom =

Swedish athletics competitor

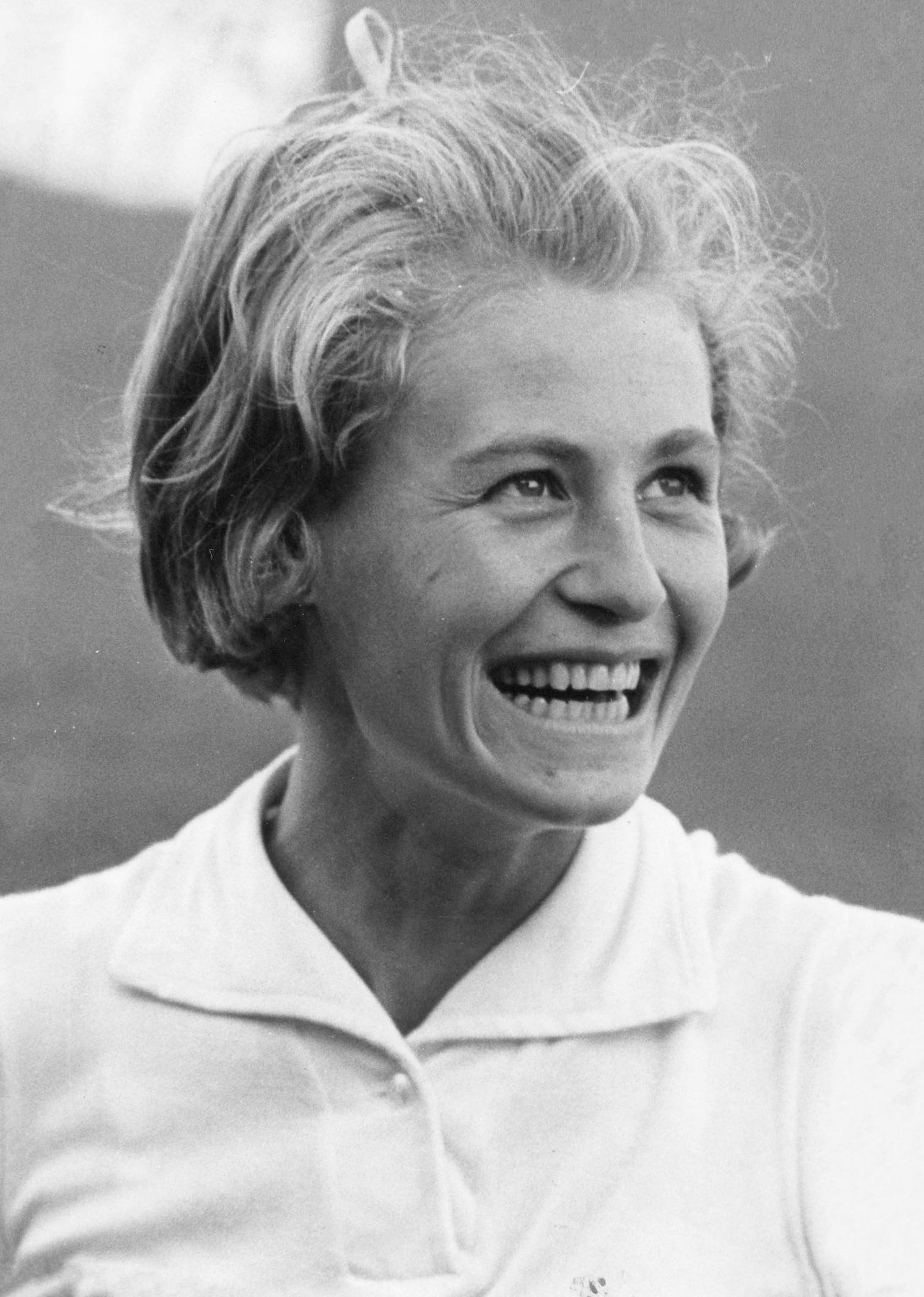

Personal information
- Born: 19 May 1943 (age 83)

Sport
- Sport: Athletics
- Event(s): Long jump, pentathlon
- Club: Mariestads AI

Achievements and titles
- Personal best: LJ – 6.31 m (1966)

Ulla Ekblom (née Olsson on 19 May 1943) is a retired Swedish athlete. She was part of the 4 × 400 m relay team that finished sixth at the 1969 European Championships, setting a new national record. She won the national titles in the long jump (1965–66) and pentathlon (1966) and set several national records in the long jump.
