= Barbara Bishop =

Barbadian sprinter

Personal information
- Nationality: Barbadian
- Born: 10 February 1956 (age 69) Scarborough, Tobago, Trinidad and Tobago

Sport
- Sport: Sprinting
- Event: 400 metres

Barbara Bishop–Bovell (born 10 February 1956) is a Barbadian sprinter. She competed in the women's 400 metres at the 1972 Summer Olympics.

Her sons George Bovell and Nick Bovell were Olympic swimmers for Trinidad and Tobago.

== International competitions ==
Year	Competition	Venue	Position	Event	Notes
Representing Barbados
1972	CARIFTA Games (U20)	Bridgetown, Barbados	2nd	400 m	57.5
1972	Olympic Games	Munich, West Germany	44th (h)	400 m	56.35
1972	Olympic Games	Munich, West Germany	13th (h)	4 × 400 m relay	3:44.5
1973	Central American and Caribbean Championships	Maracaibo, Venezuela	6th	400 m	57.7
1973	Central American and Caribbean Championships	Maracaibo, Venezuela	2nd	4 × 400 m relay	3:51.0
1974	CARIFTA Games (U20)	Kingston, Jamaica	3rd	400 m	57.1
1974	Central American and Caribbean Games	Santo Domingo, Dominican Republic	9th (h)	400 m	58.58
1974	Central American and Caribbean Games	Santo Domingo, Dominican Republic	6th	4 × 100 m relay	48.46

== Personal bests ==
- 400 metres – 55.9 (1973)
