= Heather Gooding =

Barbadian sprinter (born 1958)

Personal information
- Nationality: Barbadian
- Born: 20 March 1958 (age 67)

Sport
- Sport: Sprinting
- Event: 4 × 400 metres relay

Heather Gooding (born 20 March 1958) is a Barbadian sprinter.

== Early life ==
She moved to Nottingham in 1974.

== Career ==
She competed in the women's 4 × 400 metres relay at the 1972 Summer Olympics. She was the first woman to represent Barbados at the Olympics.
