= 1970 European Athletics Indoor Championships – Women's 400 metres =

The women's 400 metres event at the 1970 European Athletics Indoor Championships was held on 14 March in Vienna.

== Medalists ==
Gold	Silver	Bronze
Marilyn Neufville; Great Britain	Christel Frese; West Germany	Colette Besson; France

== Results ==
=== Heats ===
The winner of each heat (Q) and the next 1 fastest (q) qualified directly for the final.

Rank	Heat	Name	Nationality	Time	Notes
1	1	Christel Frese	West Germany	53.7	Q
2	1	Colette Besson	France	53.8	q
3	1	Svetla Zlateva	Bulgaria	55.5	
1	2	Marilyn Neufville	Great Britain	55.2	Q
2	2	Libuše Macounová	Czechoslovakia	56.4	
3	2	Krystyna Hryniewicka	Poland	56.7	
1	3	Karin Lundgren	Sweden	55.2	Q
2	3	Raisa Nikanorova	Soviet Union	55.8	
3	3	Donata Govoni	Italy	55.8	

=== Final ===
Rank	Name	Nationality	Time	Notes
1st place, gold medalist(s)	Marilyn Neufville	Great Britain	53.01	WB
2nd place, silver medalist(s)	Christel Frese	West Germany	53.13	
3rd place, bronze medalist(s)	Colette Besson	France	53.63	
4	Karin Lundgren	Sweden	53.8	
