= Madeline Manning =

American athletics competitor

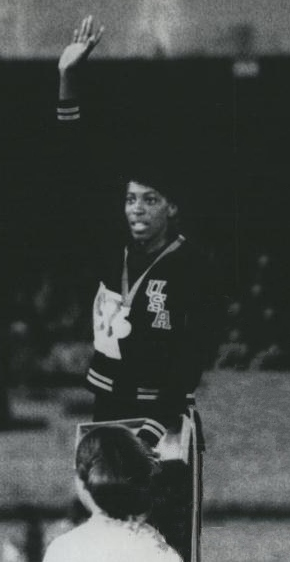
- Manning at the 1968 Summer Olympics

Personal information
- Full name: Madeline Manning-Jackson; Madeline Manning Mims
- Born: January 11, 1948 (age 78) Cleveland, Ohio, U.S.
- Height: 5 ft 9 in (175 cm)
- Weight: 165 lb (75 kg)

Sport
- Sport: Athletics
- Event: 400–1500 m
- Club: Midland RockHounds; Columbus Track Club; Cleveland Track Club

Achievements and titles
- Personal bests: 400 m – 52.2 (1972); 800 m – 1:57.90 (1976); 1500 m – 4:14.04 (1980); Mile – 4:54.4 (1975)
Medal record
Women's athletics
Representing the United States
Olympic Games
Gold medal – first place	1968 Mexico City	800 m
Silver medal – second place	1972 Munich	4 × 400 m
Pan American Games
Gold medal – first place	1967 Winnipeg	800 m
Summer Universiade
Gold medal – first place	1967 Tokyo	800 m

Madeline Manning-Mims, née Madeline Manning, (January 11, 1948) is an American former runner and Olympic champion. Between 1967 and 1981 she won ten national titles and set a number of American records. She participated in the 1968, 1972, and 1976 Summer Olympics. She likely also would have participated in the 1980 Games in Moscow, had they not been boycotted by the United States. At the 1968 Olympics she won a gold medal in the 800 m, one of only two American women to win this event. (To date, the other was Athing Mu who won gold in the 2020 Olympics.) Until 2008, she was the youngest winner of the event. At the 1972 Games in Munich she won a silver medal in the 4 × 400 m relay with teammates Mable Fergerson, Kathy Hammond, and Cheryl Toussaint. When she was three years old, she was diagnosed with spinal meningitis and not expected to live. She recovered, but was consistently sick until she was a teen.

In 1965, while she was a student at John Hay High School in Cleveland, she won her first national title in the 440-yard run at the girls' AAU championships. She was named to the U.S. team that competed in meets against West Germany, the USSR and Poland. From 1967 to 1980, Manning-Mims won 10 national indoor and outdoor titles.

Manning is a graduate of Tennessee State University and a famed member of their TigerBelles. In 1984 she was inducted into the United States National Track and Field Hall of Fame.

Manning is founder and president of the United States Council for Sports Chaplaincy and has been a chaplain at the 1988 Seoul, 1992 Barcelona, 1996 Atlanta, 2000 Sydney, 2004 Athens, and 2008 Beijing Olympic Games. She also has a ministry through sports and the arts known as Ambassadorship, Inc. She is also an author, speaker and contemporary gospel recording artist, who was inducted into the Oklahoma Jazz Hall of Fame in 2005. She is currently studying for a Master of Divinity degree at Oral Roberts University in Tulsa, Oklahoma, and is one of the chaplains of the Tulsa Shock of the WNBA.

She competed through the mid 1970s under the hyphenated name of Madeline Manning-Jackson. She married John Jackson in 1969 but divorced him by 1970. Her son from that marriage, John Jackson III was the NCAA Triple Jump champion while competing at the University of Oklahoma. After briefly retiring from the sport, she returned running with anger and frustration, to the point that her coach had to train her separately from other athletes on her team and had to ask her to slow down.

In 1976, Jackson released the gospel soul album Madeline: Running for Jesus with NewPax.
