= 1972 European Athletics Indoor Championships – Women's 4 × 360 metres relay =

The women's 4 × 360 metres relay event at the 1972 European Athletics Indoor Championships was held on 12 March in Grenoble. Each athlete ran two laps of the 180 metres track.

== Results ==
Rank	Nation	Competitors	Time	Notes
1st place, gold medalist(s)	West Germany	Rita Wilden; Erika Weinstein; Christel Frese; Inge Bödding	3:10.85	
2nd place, silver medalist(s)	Soviet Union	Natalya Chistyakova; Lyudmila Aksyonova; Lyubov Zavyalova; Nadezhda Kolesnikova	3:11.20	
3rd place, bronze medalist(s)	France	Madeleine Thomas; Bernadette Martin; Nicole Duclos; Colette Besson	3:11.65	
