= 1969 European Athletics Championships – Women's 4 × 400 metres relay =

Women's 4 × 400 metres relay at the 1969 European Athletics Championships
- Venue: Georgios Karaiskakis Stadium
- Location: Athens, Greece
- Dates: 19 September 1969 (round 1 and final)
- Competitors: 45 from 11 nations
- Winning time: 3:30.82 min WR

Medalists
gold medal	Rosemary Stirling; Patricia Lowe; Janet Simpson; Lillian Board	Great Britain
silver medal	Bernadette Martin; Nicole Duclos; Eliane Jacq; Colette Besson	France
bronze medal	Christa Czekay; Antje Gleichfeld; Inge Eckhoff; Christel Frese	West Germany

The women's 4 × 400 metres relay at the 1969 European Athletics Championships was held over two rounds at the Georgios Karaiskakis Stadium in Athens, Greece, on 19 September 1969.

== Results ==
=== Round 1 ===
19 September

Result of round 1
Rank	Heat	Nation	Competitors	Time	Notes
1	2	West Germany	Christa Czekay; Antje Gleichfeld; Inge Eckhoff; Christel Frese	3:33.9	Q, WR
2	2	Great Britain	Rosemary Stirling; Patricia Lowe; Janet Simpson; Lillian Board	3:34.3	Q, NR
3	2	Soviet Union	Taysiya Kovalevskaya; Olga Klein; Anna Dundare; Raisa Nikanorova	3:34.5	Q, NR
4	2	Hungary	Antónia Munkácsi; Magdolna Kulcsár; Rozalia Séfer; Györgyi Balogh	3:35.8	Q, NR
5	2	Denmark	Birgitte Jennes; Kirsten Hoiler; Pia Lund; Annelise Damm Olesen	3:36.2	NR
6	1	France	Bernadette Martin; Eliane Jacq; Nicole Duclos; Colette Besson	3:37.9	Q
7	2	Poland	Krystyna Hryniewicka; Danuta Piecyk; Anna Bełtowska; Elżbieta Skowrońska	3:38.1	NR
8	1	East Germany	Waltraud Birnbaum; Roswitha Becker; Ingelore Lohse; Hannelore Middecke	3:38.8	Q
9	1	Finland	Mona-Lisa Strandvall; Riitta Salin; Pirjo Häggman; Eeva Haimi	3:40.7	Q, NR
10	1	Sweden	Elisabeth Randerz; Birgitta Larsson; Ulla Ekblom; Karin Lundgren	3:41.1	Q
11	1	Italy	Maria Bruni; Armida Guzzetti; Silvana Zangirolami; Donata Govoni	3:42.3	

=== Final ===
The official times were rounded to one-tenth of a second, with both first and second place credited with a new world record of 3:30.8.

19 September

Results of the final
Rank	Nation	Competitors	Time	Notes
1st place, gold medalist(s)	Great Britain	Rosemary Stirling; Patricia Lowe; Janet Simpson; Lillian Board	3:30.82	WR
2nd place, silver medalist(s)	France	Bernadette Martin; Nicole Duclos; Eliane Jacq; Colette Besson	3:30.85	WR
3rd place, bronze medalist(s)	West Germany	Christa Czekay; Antje Gleichfeld; Inge Eckhoff; Christel Frese	3:32.7	NR
4	Soviet Union	Taysiya Kovalevskaya; Olga Klein; Anna Dundare; Raisa Nikanorova	3:33.7	NR
5	East Germany	Waltraud Birnbaum; Roswitha Becker; Ingelore Lohse; Hannelore Middecke	3:35.2	NR
6	Sweden	Elisabeth Östberg; Elisabeth Randerz; Ulla Ekblom; Karin Lundgren	3:35.4	NR
7	Hungary	Antónia Munkácsi; Magdolna Kulcsár; Rozália Séfer; Györgyi Balogh	3:36.6	NR
8	Finland	Mona-Lisa Strandvall; Riitta Salin; Pirjo Häggman; Eeva Haimi	3:40.6	NR
