= Hannelore Middecke =

German sprinter

Hannelore Middecke (née Suppe, born 1943) is a German athlete who competed in the 400 and 800 metres.

In 1965, competing in the 800 metres, Hannelore Suppe finished third at the East German indoor championships before winning the East German championships outdoors. She received the national Sportswoman of the Year award.

In 1966 she set an unofficial world record in the 10,000 metres, recording 39:10.0, though time and place were not reported.

In 1969 she became East German champion in the 400 metres. She represented the club SC Motor Jena.

At the 1969 European Championships in Athens, Middecke finished fourth in the 400 metres in an East German record of 53.1 seconds. She also finished fifth at the 1969 European Athletics Championships – Women's 4 × 400 metres relay, with Waltraud Birnbaum, Roswitha Becker and Ingelore Lohse; in another East German record time.
