= Carmen Trustée =

Cuban sprinter

Personal information
- Full name: Carmen Mónica Trustée Lee
- Born: July 16, 1948 (age 77) Banes, Holguín, Cuba
- Height: 1.62 m (5 ft 4 in)
- Weight: 52 kg (115 lb)
Medal record
Women's Athletics
Representing Cuba
Pan American Games
Silver medal – second place	1971 Cali	400 metres
Silver medal – second place	1971 Cali	4x400 m relay
Central American and Caribbean Games
Gold medal – first place	1970 Panama City	400 metres
Gold medal – first place	1970 Panama City	800 metres
Silver medal – second place	1974 Santo Domingo	400 metres
Summer Universiade
Silver medal – second place	1970 Turin	400 metres
Bronze medal – third place	1973 Moscow	400 metres

Carmen Mónica Trustée Lee (born July 16, 1948) is a retired track and field athlete from Cuba, who competed in the 400 and 800 metres during her career. She represented Cuba at the 1972 Summer Olympics in Munich, West Germany.

== International competitions ==
Year	Competition	Venue	Position	Event	Notes
Representing Cuba
1969	Central American and Caribbean Championships	Havana, Cuba	1st	400 m	55.2
1969	Central American and Caribbean Championships	Havana, Cuba	1st	800 m	2:12.2
1970	Central American and Caribbean Games	Panama City, Panama	1st	400 m	52.5
1970	Central American and Caribbean Games	Panama City, Panama	1st	800 m	2:14.8
1970	Universiade	Turin, Italy	2nd	400 m	53.5
1970	Universiade	Turin, Italy	12th (h)	800 m	2:09.7
1971	Central American and Caribbean Championships	Kingston, Jamaica	2nd	400 m	54.0
1971	Central American and Caribbean Championships	Kingston, Jamaica	1st	800 m	2:14.6
1971	Central American and Caribbean Championships	Kingston, Jamaica	1st	4 × 400 m relay	3:38.6
1971	Pan American Games	Cali, Colombia	2nd	400 m	52.89
1971	Pan American Games	Cali, Colombia	2nd	4 × 400 m relay	3:34.04
1972	Olympic Games	Munich, West Germany	9th (h)	400 m	52.80^{1}
1973	Central American and Caribbean Championships	Maracaibo, Venezuela	5th	800 m	2:16.1
1973	Central American and Caribbean Championships	Maracaibo, Venezuela	1st	4 × 400 m relay	3:42.1
1973	Universiade	Moscow, Soviet Union	3rd	400 m	53.44
1974	Central American and Caribbean Games	Santo Domingo, Dominican Republic	2nd	400 m	52.91
1974	Central American and Caribbean Games	Santo Domingo, Dominican Republic	4th	800 m	2:06.06

^{1}Did not start in the quarterfinals

== Personal bests ==
- 400 metres – 52.1 (1972)
