= Tousse =

American sportswear company

Tousse Running Apparel is an American supplier of custom uniforms for track and field, which produces track suits, speedsuits, shorts and shirts for teams. It was founded in 1987 by Olympic Silver Medalist Cheryl Toussaint. The uniforms are licensed and manufactured by GK Elite Sportswear in Reading, Pennsylvania.

== See also ==
- Sportswear (activewear)
