= Mable Fergerson =

American athlete (born 1955)

Personal information
- Born: January 18, 1955 (age 71)
Medal record
Women's Athletics
Representing United States
Olympic Games
Silver medal – second place	1972 Munich	4 × 400 metre relay

Mable Fergerson (born January 18, 1955, in Los Angeles) is an American athlete who mainly competed in the 400 metres. She made the Olympic team just weeks after graduating from Ganesha High School in Pomona, California. At the time before Title IX, high schools had no athletic programs for girls. Her 51.91 from the semi-final of the Olympics was the fastest on record for a high school girl to that point in time.

She competed for the United States at the 1972 Summer Olympics held in Munich, Germany. She won the silver medal in the 4 × 400 metres where with her teammates Madeline Manning, Cheryl Toussaint and Kathy Hammond. That year she also finished fifth in the 400 metres.
