= Promotion A =

The Promotion A (Doctor of an academic field) was an academic qualification in the DDR. It was introduced in the 3rd higher education reform with the "Regulation of academic grades" of 6 November 1968 and was governed by the doctoral ordinance of 21 January 1969. The qualification required the production of a dissertation. While the faculties of universities and tertiary institutes in West Germany each had their own doctoral and habilitation regulations, all doctorates in the DDR were governed by the Promotion A regulations. The award of the promotion was granted to the academic councils of the tertiary institutions. At the same time, the Promotion B (Doctor of Science) was introduced in imitation of the Soviet model, in order to replace the Habilitation.

In the DDR, special degrees and training programmes were created systematically and on demand in order to control academically inclined youth. The requirements for the Promotion A were the possession of an academic degree from a university or tertiary institute of the DDR, systematic knowledge of the theoretical underpinnings of the chosen subject and of Marxism–Leninism, as well as "active participation in the development of the socialist society." The Promotion A was achieved through work as a Wissenschaftlicher Assistent, Forschungsstudium and the ordinary or extraordinary Aspirantur. Work as an assistant at a DDR tertiary institution was professional employment, which was usually combined with further study and, as a rule, was limited to four years. The Forschungsstudium, by contrast, was devoted entirely to study and usually lasted three years. It was devoted exclusively to preparation for the doctorate and was linked to a stipend. The academic Aspirantur was introduced in 1951 as part of the second education reform. As a postgraduate degree it was intended mainly to meet the need for officers qualified in economics. The ordinary Aspirantur lasted three years and placed a stipend at the benefit of the student in order to free them from the need for employment. In a single year a partial Aspirantur with stipend could be granted to a student or officer for the accelerated completion of a dissertation.

After a positive assessment of the dissertation and a successful thesis defense (which could be waived), the candidate received the Promotion A. The dissertation was assessed not only on subject-based criteria but on "its theoretical substance and its social value." This was judged on the basis of its assumed value for practice and its contribution to the further development of Marxism–Leninism. This often meant that doctoral candidates, even in medicine and natural sciences, had to include chapters on Marxism–Leninism in their dissertations. Results which contradicted the official doctrines of the DDR were sometimes suppressed. At any rate, dissertations were not published and a few copies were generally accessible only in university libraries.

It is estimated that a total of 101,654 people received the Promotion A between 1951 and 1985 - that is an average of 2,904 per year (compared to 9,420 per year in West Germany between 1950 and 1982). These exclude the so-called "Geheimarbeiten" (secret works), which were not published for political reasons. The value of the "Geheimdissertation" (secret dissertation) was at 30% in the social sciences and at 10% in the natural scholarship.

== Bibliography ==
- Dieter Voigt et al.: "Zur Fragwürdigkeit akademischer Grade und Titel in der DDR." "Der Primat der kommunistischen Ideologie von der Wissenschaft. Eine Analyse von Doktorarbeiten und Habilitationsschriften der Jahre 1950 bis 1990." in Heiner Timmermann (ed.): DDR-Forschung. Bilanz und Perspektiven. Duncker & Humblot, Berlin 1995, ISBN 3-428-08462-4.
