= Allison Ross-Edwards =

Australian sprinter

Personal information
- Full name: Allison Joan Ross-Edwards
- Nationality: Australian
- Born: 17 October 1952 (age 73)

Sport
- Sport: Sprinting
- Event: 400 metres

Allison Joan Ross-Edwards (born 17 October 1952) is an Australian sprinter. She competed in the women's 400 metres at the 1972 Summer Olympics.
