= Kathy Hammond =

American sprinter

Personal information
- Full name: Kathleen Hammond
- Born: November 2, 1951 (age 74) Sacramento, California, U.S.
Medal record
Women's athletics
Representing United States
Olympic Games
Silver medal – second place	1972 Munich	4 × 400 meters
Bronze medal – third place	1972 Munich	400 meters

Kathleen Hammond (born November 2, 1951) is an American athlete who mainly competed in the 400 meters.

Hammond was born in Sacramento, California. She was a child prodigy, winning the National Indoor Championship at 440 yards in 1967, when she was just 15 year old.

She competed for the United States at the 1972 Summer Olympics held in Munich, Germany where she won the bronze medal in the women's 400 meters. She then competed in the 4 × 400 meters where she won the silver medal with her teammates Mable Fergerson, Madeline Manning and Cheryl Toussaint.

Club Affiliation: Kathy Hammond represented the Sacramento Road Runners in 1971, and the Will's Spikettes in 1967–1970. She broke the American Record at 440-yards in 52.2 8/12/1972.

In 2018, Hammond was inducted into the National Track and Field Hall of Fame.

== Rankings ==
Hammond was ranked among the best in the US and the world in the 400 m sprint from 1967 to 1972, according to the votes of the experts of Track and Field News.

400 meters
Year	World rank	US rank
1967	5th	2nd
1968	10th	2nd
1969	2nd	1st
1970	3rd	1st
1971	-	-
1972	3rd	1st

== USA Championships ==
Hammond was a very successful competitor at 400 m in the USA National Track and Field Championships between 1967 and 1973:

USA Championships
Year	400m
1967	2nd
1968	-
1969	1st
1970	4th
1971	-
1972	1st
1973	3rd
