= Nicole Duclos =

French former track and field athlete

Medal record

Women's athletics

Representing France

European Championships
Gold medal – first place	1969 Athens	400 m
Silver medal – second place	1969 Athens	4×400 m

European Indoor Championships
Gold medal – first place	1970 Vienna	Medley relay
Silver medal – second place	1973 Rotterdam	4×340 m
Bronze medal – third place	1972 Grenoble	4×360 m

Nicole Duclos, née Nicole Salavert, (15 August 1947) is a French former track and field athlete who competed in the 400 metres. She broke the world record for the event in 1969, running 51.72 seconds to become European champion in 1969. She also shared in a world record in the 4 × 400 metres relay. She represented France at the 1972 Summer Olympics and was a three-time national champion.

== Career ==
Born in Périgueux, she began training at the CA Brive sports club. She competed for France in her teenage years as a junior athlete and came to prominence in her early twenties. She had her first 400 m national title at the French Athletics Championships in 1969 and her winning time of 52.8 seconds was a new championship record by a whole second.

She was selected to run both individually and in the relay at the 1969 European Athletics Championships. In the 400 m final she edged compatriot Colette Besson at the line by two hundredths to win the gold medal in a world record time of 51.77 seconds. This knocked two tenths off Shin Geum-Dan near-seven-year-old record. The time was the championship record for five years, after which it was broken by Finland's Riitta Salin, and remained the French record for the 400 m for much longer and was only improved upon in 1987 by Marie-José Pérec. Duclos broke another world record at the European Championships, teaming up with Bernadette Martin, Eliane Jacq and rival Besson in the 4 × 400 metres relay to run a time of 3:30.8 minutes. However, the team recorded the same time as Britain's women's team and despite sharing the world record, were only the silver medallists at the competition. For these feats she was chosen as that year's L'Équipe Champion of Champions, becoming only the second female winner of the award after Marielle Goitschel.

In spite of her success in 1969, she subsequently failed to win an individual medal internationally. The quality of competition greatly improved, with Marilyn Neufville of Jamaica improving the world record by seventh tenths of a second just ten months after Duclos's feat. Instead Duclos went on to be a medallist only with the national relay team. The 1970 European Athletics Indoor Championships saw her win gold in a novel medley relay event. At the 1971 European Athletics Championships she helped the French women to the relay final, but the team failed to finish. Her last two international medals came in the short-lived 4 × 380 metres relay at the 1972 and 1973 European Athletics Indoor Championships, where she was a bronze, then silver medallist.

Duclos returned to the top of the national podium at the 1972 French Championships and gained selection for France at the 1972 Summer Olympics as a result. Her national title-winning time of 52.3 seconds was a championship record which stood until 1980, when Sophie Malbranque became the first under 52 seconds at the contest. At the Munich Olympics Duclos was a semi-finalist in the 400 m and ranked fourth in the 4 × 400 m relay alongside Martine Duvivier, Besson and Martin. She won her third and final national title in the 400 m at the French Indoor Athletics Championships in 1973 (her last season in major competitions).

== National titles ==
- French Athletics Championships
  - 400 m: 1969, 1972
- French Indoor Athletics Championships
  - 400 m: 1973

== International competitions ==
Year	Competition	Venue	Position	Event	Notes
1969	European Championships	Athens, Greece	1st	400 m	51.77 WR
1969	European Championships	Athens, Greece	2nd	4 × 400 m relay	3:30.85 WR
1970	European Indoor Championships	Vienna, Austria	1st	2000 m relay	4:58.4
1971	European Championships	Helsinki, Finland	—	4 × 400 m relay	DNF
1972	European Indoor Championships	Grenoble, France	3rd	4 × 360 m relay	
1972	Olympic Games	Munich, West Germany	11th (semis)	400 m	52.18
1972	Olympic Games	Munich, West Germany	4th	4 × 400 m relay	3:27.5
1973	European Indoor Championships	Rotterdam, Netherlands	2nd	4 × 360 m relay	3:11.20

== See also ==
- List of European Athletics Championships medalists (women)
- List of European Athletics Indoor Championships medalists (women)

Records
Preceded by Shin Geum-Dan	Women's 400 metres world record holder 18 September 1969 — 23 July 1970	Succeeded by Marilyn Neufville
