= Trudy Ruth =

Dutch sprinter (born 1950)

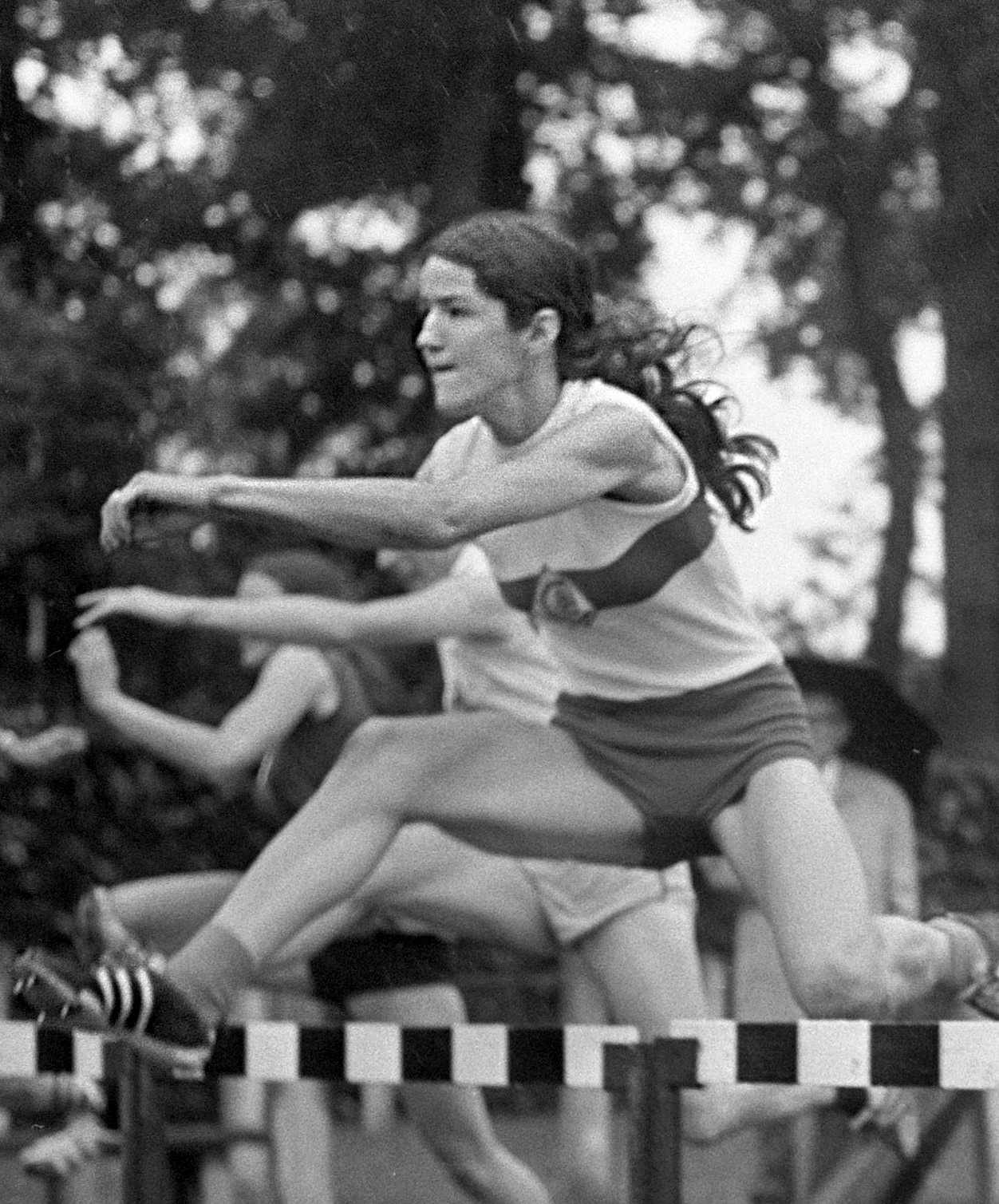
- Trudy Ruth in 1970

Personal information
- Born: 20 May 1950 (age 76) Hilversum, the Netherlands
- Height: 1.72 m (5 ft 8 in)
- Weight: 59 kg (130 lb)

Sport
- Sport: Sprint running
- Club: GAC, Hilversum

Achievements and titles
- Olympic finals: 1972

Geertruida Hendrika "Trudy" Ruth (born 20 May 1950) is a retired Dutch sprinter. She competed at the 1972 Summer Olympics in the 400 m event, but failed to reach the final.
