= Gerlinde Massing =

Austrian sprinter

Personal information
- Nationality: Austrian
- Born: 8 January 1951 (age 74)

Sport
- Sport: Sprinting
- Event: 4 × 400 metres relay

Gerlinde Massing (born 8 January 1951) is an Austrian sprinter. She competed in the women's 4 × 400 metres relay at the 1972 Summer Olympics.
