= Vreni Leiser =

Swiss sprinter

Personal information
- Nationality: Swiss
- Born: 23 September 1945 (age 80) Basel, Switzerland

Sport
- Sport: Sprinting
- Event: 400 metres
- Club: LC Basel / BTV Aarau

Vreni Leiser (born 23 September 1945) is a Swiss sprinter. She competed in the women's 400 metres at the 1972 Summer Olympics.
