= Christel Frese =

German sprinter

Personal information
- Nationality: German
- Born: 3 August 1944 (age 81) Remscheid, Nordrhein-Westfalen, Germany
- Height: 165 cm (5 ft 5 in)
- Weight: 50 kg (110 lb)

Sport
- Sport: Athletics
- Event: 400 m
- Club: ASV Köln
Medal record
Women's athletics
Representing West Germany
European Championships
Silver medal – second place	1971 Helsinki	4×400 m
Bronze medal – third place	1969 Athens	4×400 m
European Indoor Championships
Gold medal – first place	1972 Grenoble	400 m
Gold medal – first place	1972 Grenoble	4×360 m
Silver medal – second place	1970 Vienna	400 m

Christel Frese (born 3 August 1944) is a German former athlete who was successful as a 400-meter runner in the late 1960s and early 1970s. She competed for the Federal Republic of Germany in the 1972 Summer Olympics. She won one silver and one bronze medal at European Championships with the 4 × 400-meter relay of the Federal Republic of Germany.

== Biography ==
Frese grew up in Meggen and was initially a member of the TV Meggen, where she trained under Gerd Manke. In 1964, she came to Cologne to study sports and joined the local ASV Köln. Her coach was Fredy Wehrmann, who supervised Frese at 49 German championships.

Frese began her athletic career as a sprinter over 100 and 200 meters. She had her first medal in 1966, when she came in second place at the German Championships in the 4 × 100-meter relay with the ASV behind the representation of Hamburger SV. Then she switched to the 400-meter track. In 1968, she played her first international match in Buxtehude.

In 1969, she won her first German championship over 400 meters and a bronze medal at the European Championships in Athens as the final runner of the 4 × 400 -meter relay. In 1970, for three times she affirmed the German record over 400 meters and on 22 August 1970 won at the European Cup in Budapest, the silver medal. Also she became vice European champion in the hall.

Frese finished second behind Marilyn Neufville in the 400 metres event at the 1970 WAAA Championships.

Frese failed twice with her single medal at open air European Championships: In 1969, the West German team proclaimed the refusal to start for Jürgen May in the individual competitions and in 1971, in Helsinki Frese came only to the semifinals due to an injury-related training backlog. However, in 1971, she won the Internationales Stadionfest in Berlin.

She took part in the 1972 Olympic Games in Munich, after she had recently improved the German record, but injured in the 400-meter interlude and thus could not compete for the season. Throughout her career, Christel Frese won 9 German and six European Championship titles and has run 15 German, 4 European and 3 world records. Totally she won 26 country battles.

In 1975, Christel Frese ended her career as an athlete and became a footballer. In the years 1975-1977 she played for the SSG 09 Bergisch Gladbach (until 1977) and became German women's football champion in the same year. She also played for SC 07 Bad Neuenahr and VfL Euskirchen. Later she worked as a trainer for VfL. Later, she went to TuS Halberbracht, a village club in Lennestadt, where she led the first goalkeeper training and later the training of the girls' football team.

== Personal life ==
From 1968 to 2007, Christel Frese worked as a teacher of sports, mathematics and biology at the Marienschule. Among her students was Silke Rottenberg.

She is a member of the Breed Breeding Association under the name Christel Frese-Gerber.

== Achievements ==
=== World records ===
In the limelight of the public, Christel Frese set a world record, which she ran on 19 September 1969 at the European Athletics Championships in Athens with the 4 × 400-meter relay (Team: Christa Czekay, Antje Gleichfeld, Inge Eckhoff and as final runner Christel Frese). The achieved time of 3: 33,9 min, however, was undercut the next day by the British and the French squadron.

- Christel Frese set another world record at the European Indoor Championships in Vienna on 14 March 1970, when she had reached the top of the 400 m mark, the previous unofficial indoor best time of 55.29s, run by Natalya Petschonkina from the Soviet Union in 1968, at 53, 7s improved. However, this world record had an even shorter duration than that of Athens: already one and a half hours later, Marilyn Neufville starting for the Great Britain won the final race in the world record time of 53.0 s ahead of Christel Frese in 53.1 s.

=== German records ===
Her first German record ran Christel Frese on 15 June 1969 in Copenhagen as a member of the 4 × 400-meter relay (participants: Eckhoff, Gleichfeld, Dannenberg and Frese) in 3: 48.4 min

- In 1970, Christel Frese won three times German record over 400 meters (held by Helga Henning):
- 52.7 s, scored on 16 July at the international match Germany-USA in Stuttgart
- 52.6 s, scored on 8 August in Berlin
- 52.4 s, scored on 11 October. With this achievement, she took the third place in the annual world best list.
- 52.2 s, scored on 20 May 1972 in Bonn. However, this record no longer appears in the lists of the German Athletics Association, as the GDR athlete Helga Seidler had already run 400 meters in 52.2 s the previous year and the record lists of the Federal Republic of Germany and the GDR were merged.

=== Olympic Games ===
- 1972 Olympic Games in Munich.
- Christel Frese won her first run with 52.89 s and was then able to knock out Mexico's Olympic champion Colette Besson as fourth in the 53.01 s in the interlude. But then she suffered in the semifinals the injury pitch. However, to qualify for the final, she would have run under 52 seconds, as the fourth-placed, the eventual bronze medalist Kathy Hammond, scored 51.92.

=== European championships ===
400 m open air

- 1969 Athens: Not started (boycott of the German team because refusal to start for Jürgen May)
- 1971 Helsinki: 1st run (54.4 s), 6th run (54.1 s)

400 m hall

- 1969 in Belgrade: silver (54.8 s), behind Besson (54.0 s) and before Stirling (54.2 s)
- 1970 in Vienna: silver (53.13 s), behind Neufville (53.01 s) and before Besson (53.63 s)
- 1972 in Grenoble: Gold (53.36 s), before Bödding (54.60 s) and Weinstein (54.73 s)
- 1973 in Rotterdam: 4th (53.78 s)

4 × 400 m

- 1969 Athens Bronze (3: 32.7 min), Team: Czekay, Gleichfeld, Eckhoff, Frese. The set in the run on 19 September 1969 world record with 3: 33.9 min held only until the next day.
- 1971 Helsinki Silver (3: 33.04 min), team: Rückes, Frese, Falck, Bödding (Eckhoff)

4 × 2 round hall

- 1972 Grenoble Gold (3: 10.4 min), Team: Wilden, Weinstein, Frese, Bödding

=== European Cup ===
- 1970, Semi-Final in Berlin: Winner (53.5 s)
- 1970, final in Budapest:

Silver 400 m (53.5 s) behind Helga Fischer (GDR) (53.2 s) and ahead of Wera Popkowa (USSR) (54.0 s) Silver 4 × 400 m (3: 37.2 min) behind the GDR (3: 37.0 min) and in front of Great Britain (3: 37.8 min)

=== German championships ===
400 m

- 1969 Master (54.3 s)
- 1970 Master (52.6 s)
- 1971 second behind Inge Bödding and before Anette Rückes
- 1972 second behind Rita Wilden and before Anette Rückes
- 1973 third behind Rita Wilden and Erika Weinstein

400 m hall

- 1969 Master (56.4 s)
- 1970 Master (55.2 s)
- 1972 Master (54.0 s)
- 1973 Master (53.7 s)

Cross, short distance team (ASV Cologne)

- 1970 Master (Team: Merten, Frese, Theissen)
- 1971 Master (Team: Frese, Theissen, Windbrake)
- 1974 Master (Team: Frese, Theissen, Windbrake)

3 × 800 m relay (ASV Cologne)

- 1970 Master (Team: Windbrake, Frese, Theissen)

4 × 400 m relay (TuS 04 Leverkusen)'

- 1975 Master (Team: Frese, Weinstein, Wellmann, Wilden)

German championships over 4 × 400 m of women were held in 1975 for the first time.

Personal bests

- 100 m: 11.84 s, 7 October 1973, Bonn
- 200 m: 24.13 s, 7 October 1973, Bonn
- 400 m: 52.2 s, 20 May 1972, Bonn
- Hall: 53.1 s, 14 March 1970, Vienna
