= Marcela Chibás =

Cuban sprinter

Personal information
- Full name: Marcela Chibás Maletá
- Born: 31 December 1951 (age 74) Guantánamo, Cuba
- Height: 1.64 m (5 ft 5 in)
- Weight: 61 kg (134 lb)

Sport
- Sport: Sprinting
- Event: 400 metres
Medal record
Women's Athletics
Representing Cuba
Pan American Games
| Silver medal – second place | 1971 Cali | 4x400 m relay |

Marcela Chibás Maletá (born 31 December 1951) is a Cuban sprinter. She competed in the women's 4 × 400 metres relay at the 1972 Summer Olympics.

== Personal bests ==
- 400 metres – 54.1 (1972)
