= Eva-Charlotte Malmström =

Swedish sprinter

Personal information
- Nationality: Swedish
- Born: 18 January 1948 (age 77) Eskilstuna, Sweden

Sport
- Sport: Sprinting
- Event: 4 × 400 metres relay
- Club: Mälarhöjdens IK

Eva-Charlotte "Lotta" Malmström (born 18 January 1948) is a Swedish sprinter. She competed in the women's 4 × 400 metres relay at the 1972 Summer Olympics.

Malmström was born in Eskilstuna and competed for Mälarhöjdens IK. From 1974 to 1976, she won the national title in women's 400 metres hurdles and in 1975 she also won the 400 metres. She represented Sweden in the 4 × 400 metres relay event at the 1971 European Athletics Indoor Championships, finishing 6th.
