= Éliane Jacq =

French sprinter

Personal information
- Nationality: France
- Born: 4 July 1948 Brest
- Died: 1 March 2011 (aged 62) Lorient

Sport
- Event: 400 metres

Achievements and titles
- Regional finals: 1969 European Athletics Championships
Medal record
Women's athletics
Representing France
European Championships
Silver medal – second place	1969 Athens	4×400 m

Éliane Jacq (born 4 July 1948 at Brest and died on 1 March 2011 at Lorient) was a French athlete who specialised in the 400 meters.

== Career ==
She won the silver medal in the 4 × 400 Metres Relay during the 1969 European Championships along with Bernadette Martin, Nicole Duclos and Colette Besson. The French team set a new world record in the discipline of 3 min 30 s 8, but came second to the United Kingdom in a photo-finish, with both teams recording the same time.

She won the 1970 French 400m championship (53 9 s) and was French Indoor 400m champion in 1974.

She died on 1 March 2011 at Lorient, following a long illness.

=== Prize list ===
International Awards
Date	Competition	Location	Result	Event	Performance
1969	European Championships	Athens	2	4 × 400 m	3 min 30 s 8

=== Records ===
Her personal bests were 12 s 1 (100 m) (1966) 23 s 9 (200 m) (1973) and 53 s 9 (400 m) (1970).

== Notes and references ==
- Siukonen, Markku; Ahola, Matti (1990), Suuri EM-kirja (in Finnish), Sporttikustannus Oy, p. 96, ISBN 951-8920-11-7
