= Inge Bödding =

German sprinter

Inge Bödding née Eckhoff
Personal information
- Nationality: Germany
- Born: 29 March 1947 (age 79) Hamburg, Germany
- Height: 154 cm (5 ft 1 in)
- Weight: 48 kg (106 lb)

Sport
- Sport: Athletics
- Event: 400 m
- Club: LG Nord-West, Hamburg
Medal record
Women's athletics
Representing West Germany
Olympic Games
| Bronze medal – third place | 1972 Munich | 4×400 m |
European Championships
| Silver medal – second place | 1971 Helsinki | 400 m |
| Silver medal – second place | 1971 Helsinki | 4×400 m |
| Bronze medal – third place | 1969 Athens | 4×400 m |
European Indoor Championships
| Gold medal – first place | 1972 Grenoble | 4×360 m |
| Silver medal – second place | 1971 Sofia | 400 m |
| Silver medal – second place | 1972 Grenoble | 400 m |

Inge Bödding (née Eckhoff; 29 March 1947) is a retired German athlete who competed mainly in the 400 metres and competed at the 1972 Summer Olympics.

== Biography ==
Eckhoff finished third behind Marilyn Neufville in the 400 metres event at the British 1970 WAAA Championships.

She competed for West Germany at the 1972 Summer Olympics held in Munich where she won the bronze medal in the women's 4 × 400 metres with her teammates Anette Rückes, Hildegard Falck and Rita Wilden.
