= Rita Kühne =

East German sprinter

- Kühne in 1972

Personal information
- Born: 5 January 1947 (age 79) Dresden, Soviet occupation zone in Germany
Medal record
Women's athletics
Representing East Germany
Olympic Games
Gold medal – first place	1972 Munich	4×400 m
European Championships
Gold medal – first place	1971 Helsinki	4×400 m

Rita Kühne (later Andrich then Schiemann; born 5 January 1947, in Dresden) is a former East German athlete who competed mainly in the 400 metres.

She competed for East Germany in the 1972 Summer Olympics held in Munich, Germany in the 4 × 400 metres where she won the gold medal with her teammates Dagmar Käsling, Helga Seidler and 400 m gold medalist Monika Zehrt.
