= Bożena Zientarska =

Polish athlete

Personal information
- Nationality: Polish
- Born: 14 November 1952 (age 73) Zielona Góra, Poland

Sport
- Sport: Sprinting
- Event: 400 metres

Bożena Zientarska (born 14 November 1952) is a Polish sprinter. She competed in the women's 400 metres at the 1972 Summer Olympics.
