= Anette Rückes =

German sprinter (born 1951)

Personal information
- Born: 19 December 1951 (age 74) Bad Marienberg, Rhineland-Palatinate, Germany
Medal record
Women's athletics
Representing West Germany
Olympic Games
Bronze medal – third place	1972 Munich	4×400 m
European Championships
Silver medal – second place	1971 Helsinki	4×400 m

Anette Rückes (born 19 December 1951 in Bad Marienberg, Rhineland-Palatinate) is a German athlete who competed mainly in the 400 metres.

She competed for West Germany in the 1972 Summer Olympics held in Munich in the 4 × 400 metres where she won the bronze medal with her teammates Inge Bödding, Hildegard Falck and Rita Wilden.
