= Elisabeth Randerz =

Swedish sprinter

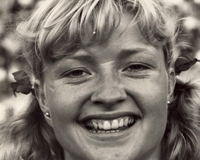

Personal information
- Nationality: Swedish
- Born: 26 September 1950 (age 75) Malmö, Sweden
- Height: 168 cm (5 ft 6 in)
- Weight: 55 kg (121 lb)

Sport
- Sport: Sprinting
- Event: 100–400 m
- Club: GKIK, Gothenburg

Achievements and titles
- Personal best: 400 m – 53.99 (1973)

Anna Elisabeth Randerz (later Fredriksson; born 26 September 1950) is a Swedish sprinter who competed in the 4 × 400 metres relay at the 1972 Summer Olympics. She was also part of the Swedish relay teams that placed sixth at the 1969 and 1971 European Championships. Besides 400 m, she ran 100 and 200 m, reaching a final in the 4 × 100 m relay at the 1971 European Championships.
