= Helga Seidler =

East German sprinter

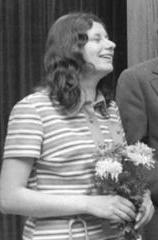
- Helga Seidler in 1972

Personal information
- Born: 5 August 1949 (age 76)
Medal record
Women's athletics
Representing East Germany
Olympic Games
Gold medal – first place	1972 Munich	4×400 m
European Championships
Gold medal – first place	1971 Helsinki	400 m
Gold medal – first place	1971 Helsinki	4×400 m

Helga Seidler, née Helga Fischer, (5 August 1949 in Oberneuschönberg) is a former East German athlete who mainly competed in the women's 400 metres event.

She competed for East Germany at the 1972 Summer Olympics held in Munich, Germany where she won the gold medal in the women's 4 × 400 meters with her teammates Dagmar Käsling, Rita Kühne and Monika Zehrt.
