= Marika Lindholm =

Finnish sprinter

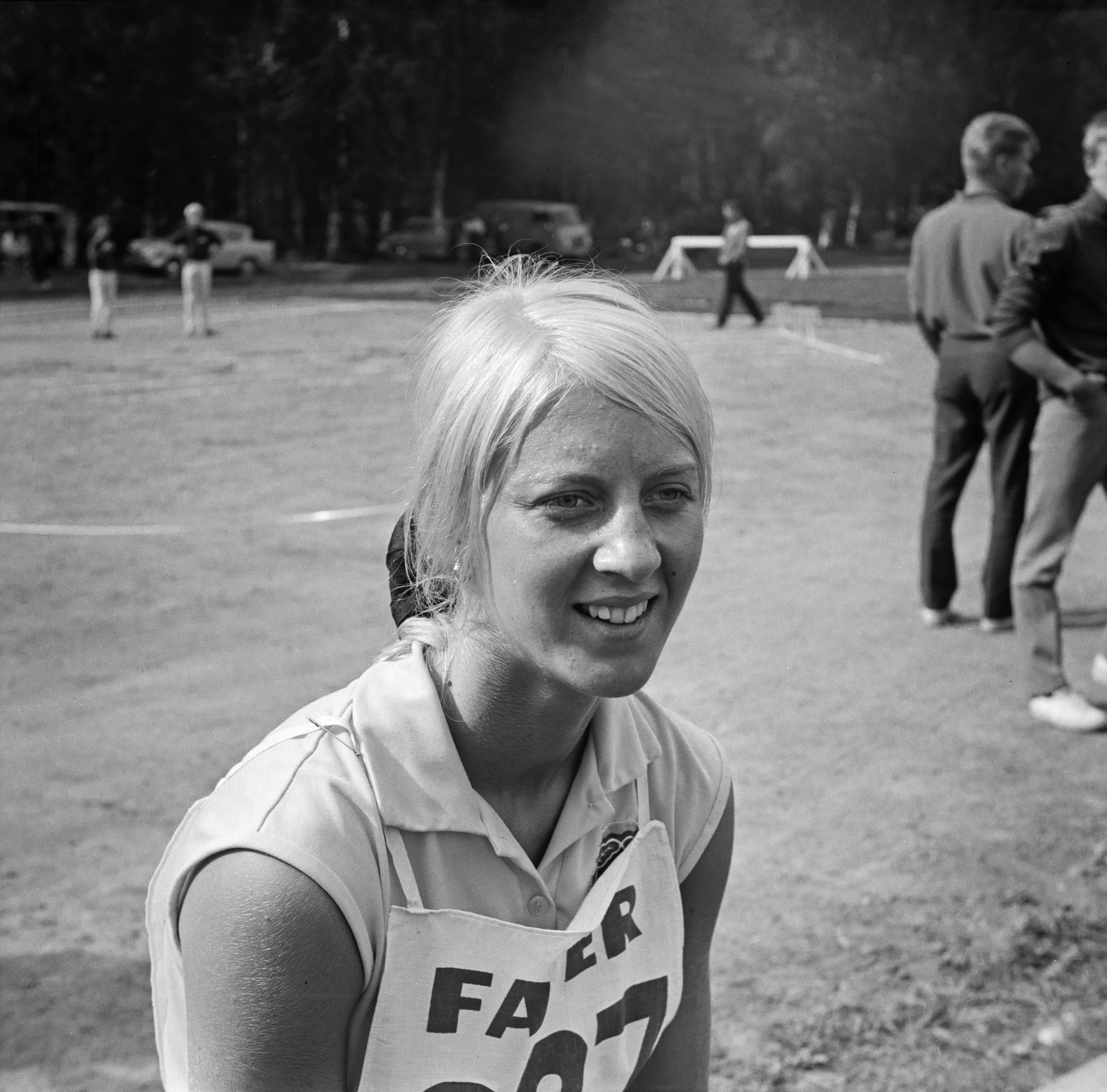
- Marika Eklund 1966

Personal information
- Nationality: Finnish
- Born: Marika Eklund; 14 April 1948 (age 78) Hanko, Finland

Sport
- Sport: Sprinting
- Event: 400 metres
Medal record
Women's athletics
Representing Finland
European Championships
Silver medal – second place	1974 Rome	4×400 m

Marika Lindholm (née Eklund; born 14 April 1948) is a Finnish sprinter. She competed in the 400 metres at the 1972 Summer Olympics and the 1976 Summer Olympics.
