= Nadezhda Kolesnikova =

Soviet educator (1882–1964)

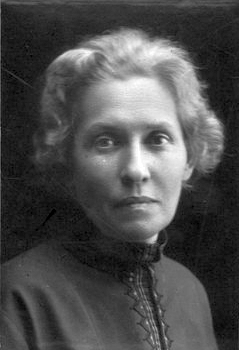
Kolesnikova Nadezhda in 1925

Nadezhda Nikolayevna Kolesnikova (Russian: Надежда Николаевна Колесникова; née Drobinskaya (Russian: Дробинская); 31 August [12 September] 1882 – 18 March 1964) was a Russian revolutionary and educator. She served as People's Commissar of Education of the Baku Council of People's Commissars, a rector of the Academy of Communist Education named after Nadezhda Krupskaya (1929–1933), and a delegate of the 15th and 16th Congresses of the All-Union Communist Party (Bolsheviks).

== Early life and education ==
Nadezhda was born in the family of an employee. Her maiden name was Drobinskaya. She graduated from the Moscow Pedagogical Courses.

== Career ==
Drobinskaya worked as a teacher at the gymnasium named after Nataliya Shchepoteva. In 1902, while studying in pedagogical courses, she joined the revolutionary movement. In 1904, Drobinskaya joined the Russian Social Democratic Labour Party. In 1905, she taught at the Primary School of Fedor Kopeikin-Serebryakov.

== Activism ==
During the December armed uprising of 1905 in Moscow, Drobinskaya planned to organize a free canteen for orphans at her school. The chief of staff of the "military squads" of Presnya district Zinoviy Litvin-Sedoy, having learned about this, found the necessary kitchen equipment and food (cereals, meat, potatoes, etc.) for the dining room and also organized the headquarters of combat squads in the school building. Drobinskaya became the commandant of the Presnya "druzhinnik" headquarters, where she organized a food service for workers belonging to the "military squads," orphans, women, and the elderly.

After the suppression of the uprising, Drobinskaya was arrested and kept in the Butyrka prison. On 28 December 1906, she appeared before the court, which sentenced her to a correctional confinement department for 1.5 years. However, Drobinskaya managed to leave the courthouse and escape when the verdict was being read.

Drobinskaya changed her surname to Kolesnikova and left for Baku. She worked in the Baku organization of the Russian Social Democratic Labour Party (RSDLP) from 1907 to 1909. From 1910 to 1911 she lived in Kyiv and St. Petersburg. Then Kolesnikova returned to Baku, where she continued to work in the RSDLP (1911-1916). As a cover, she worked as a teacher in a Baku school, teaching Russian language and literature.

Kolesnikova married the Bolshevik Yakov Zevin. In 1916, Kolesnikova and Zevin were arrested for distributing revolutionary literature and were kept in Bailovskaya prison for about a year. In January 1917, Kolesnikova and her husband were exiled to Kashira under police supervision.

=== After the Revolution ===
After the February Revolution, the family moved to Moscow. In the first half of 1917, Kolesnikova was elected secretary of the Moscow district organization of the RSDLP (Bolsheviks).

In August 1917, together with her husband, she moved to Baku, where she took an active part in the establishment of Soviet power in Azerbaijan. On April 25, 1918, at a meeting of the Baku Council, the Baku Council of People's Commissars (Sovnarkom) was formed, which included Kolesnikova (People's Commissar of Education) and her husband Yakov Zevin (People's Commissar of Labor). After the temporary fall of Soviet power in Baku (31 July 1918), Yakov Zevin was arrested and shot among 26 Baku commissars.

On 14 September 1918, Kolesnikova, together with young children, was evacuated from Baku, sailing on a steamer to Astrakhan. Already in January 1919, she headed the Astrakhan provincial committee of the Russian Communist Party (Bolsheviks). In this post, she did a lot of work on organizing the defense of Astrakhan.

In the summer of 1919, being the chairman of the Astrakhan provincial committee, Kolesnikova came to Moscow for treatment, where she met Nadezhda Krupskaya, who offered her to become her deputy. Kolesnikova worked with Krupskaya in the People's Commissariat for Education of the RSFSR. She was a member of the board of the out-of-school department of the People's Commissariat for Education. Soon she became a friend of the Krupskaya family and Lenin. Lenin fussed about allocating Kolesnikova and her two children a room in Moscow.

Later Kolesnikova worked in various party organizations in leadership positions: Deputy People's Commissar of Education of the Azerbaijan SSR, head of the propaganda department of the Moscow Provincial Committee of the Russian Communist Party (Bolsheviks), in the Yaroslavl Provincial Party Committee.

In 1927, Kolesnikova was elected a delegate to the XV Congress of the All-Union Communist Party (Bolsheviks). From 1929 to 1932, she was a rector of the Academy of Communist Education, named after Nadezhda Krupskaya. In 1930, Kolesnikova took part as a delegate to the XVI Congress of the All-Union Communist Party (Bolsheviks). She was a member of the "purge" commission in the party organization of the Air Force of the Red Army in the early 1930s.

From 1933 to 1957, All-Union Communist Party (Bolsheviks) conducted scientific work at the Marx-Engels-Lenin Institute under the Central Committee of the All-Union Communist Party of Bolsheviks, as well as at the Central Lenin Museum.

Nadezhda Kolesnikova died on 18 March 1964 in Moscow. She was buried at the Novodevichy Cemetery.

== Awards and honors ==
- Two Orders of Lenin
- Medals

== Commemoration ==
A memorial plaque was installed in memory of the work of Nadezhda Kolesnikova during the December armed uprising of 1905 on the wall of house number 7 on Bolshoi Predtechensky Lane in Moscow. In 1982, a postal envelope with a portrait of Nadezhda Kolesnikova was issued in the USSR.
