= Rosemary Stirling =

British athlete (born 1947)

Rosemary Wright
Personal information
- Born: Rosemary Olivia Stirling; 11 December 1947 (age 78) Timaru, New Zealand
- Height: 157 cm (5 ft 2 in)
- Weight: 51 kg (112 lb)
- Spouse: Trevor Wright
- Relative: Sam Ruthe (grandson)

Sport
- Sport: Athletics
- Event: 400 m/440 y
- Club: WBAC
Medal record
Women's athletics
Representing Great Britain
European Championships
Gold medal – first place	1969 Athens	4 × 400 metres relay
Bronze medal – third place	1971 Helsinki	800 metres
European Indoor Championships
Bronze medal – third place	1969 Belgrade	400 metres
Bronze medal – third place	1971 Sofia	800 metres
Representing Scotland
Commonwealth Games
Gold medal – first place	1970 Edinburgh	800 metres

Rosemary Olivia Wright, née Stirling (11 December 1947) is a former British sprinter and middle-distance runner. She won a gold medal in the 4 × 400 m relay at the 1969 European Championships, and a gold medal in the 800 m at the 1970 Commonwealth Games. Her 800 m best of 2:00.15, stood as the Scottish record for 30 years (1972–2002).

== Career ==
Born in Timaru, Canterbury, New Zealand to a Scottish father and English mother, she moved with her family to Wolverhampton, England as a teenager where she joined the Wolverhampton Harriers. At the age of 16 she was one of the best British female runners over 800 metres. In the British Empire and Commonwealth Games in 1966 in Kingston, Jamaica she competed for Scotland over 440 yards and 880 yards and finished in fourth place in both events. In 1969 she won the bronze medal in the 400 m at the European Indoor Games in Belgrade. She also competed at the 1969 European Championships in Athletics in Athens, Greece, placing eighth in the 400 metres final and, with teammates Pat Lowe, Janet Simpson and Lillian Board, helping Great Britain win gold in the 4 × 400-metres relay in world record time (3:30.8) .

At the 1970 Commonwealth Games in Edinburgh she won gold in the 800 metres race. At the European Indoor Athletics Championships in 1971 in Sofia, she was awarded the 800m Bronze medal behind Hildegard Falck and Ileana Silai. She also won Bronze the same year at the European Championships in Helsinki. At the 1972 Summer Olympics in Munich she finished seventh in the 800 metres with a personal best time of 2:00.15 that lasted as a UK record until 1979. In 1974, at the British Commonwealth Games in Christchurch, New Zealand, she was a member of the Scottish relay team that finished fourth. At the European Indoor Championships in Gothenburg she finished in fourth place in the 800 m.

== Personal life ==
Rosemary married her English-born husband, Trevor Wright, who ran for New Zealand, having met him while competing in Helsinki in 1971. She lived in Wolverhampton until the age of 34, when the couple moved to New Zealand. Their grandson Sam Ruthe is also a runner.
