= Monika Zehrt =

East German sprinter

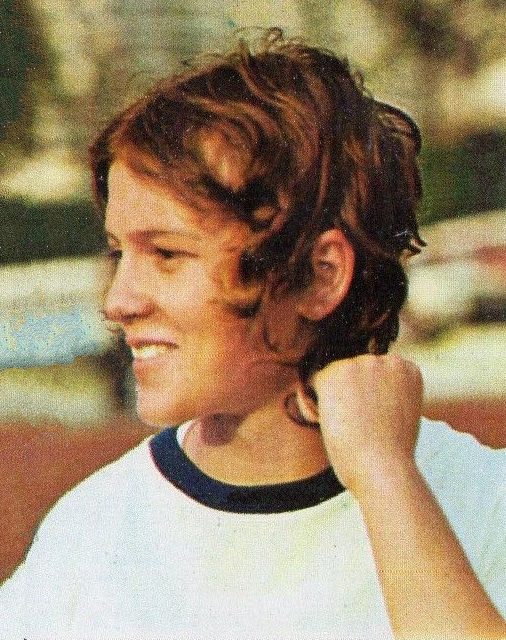
- Monika Zehrt in 1972

Personal information
- Born: 29 September 1952 (age 73) Riesa, Bezirk Dresden, East Germany
- Height: 1.68 m (5 ft 6 in)
- Weight: 56 kg (123 lb)

Sport
- Sport: Athletics
- Event: 400 m
- Club: SC Dynamo Berlin

Achievements and titles
- Personal best: 51.08 (1972)
Medal record
Women's athletics
Representing East Germany
Olympic Games
Gold medal – first place	1972 Munich	400 m
Gold medal – first place	1972 Munich	4×400 m
European Championships
Gold medal – first place	1971 Helsinki	4×400 m

Monika Zehrt (later Landgraf, born 29 September 1952) is a retired East German sprinter who specialized in the 400 m. At the 1972 Olympics she won gold medals in the individual 400 m and 4 × 400 m relay, setting an Olympic and a world record, respectively. Zehrt also won relay golds at the 1971 European Championships and the 1970 and 1973 European Cup. During her career she set one world record in the 400 m and four in the 4 × 400 m. After retiring in 1974, she earned a degree in external trade and a leading position at a furniture company. She married, but then divorced Jochen Landgraf, a 400 m hurdler.
