= Maria Sykora =

Austrian sprinter (born 1946)

Personal information
- Nationality: Austrian
- Born: 11 October 1946 (age 79) Tulln an der Donau, Austria

Sport
- Sport: Sprinting
- Event: 400 metres
Medal record
Women's athletics
Representing Austria
European Championships
Bronze medal – third place	1969 Athens	400 m
European Indoor Championships
Gold medal – first place	1970 Vienna	800 m
Bronze medal – third place	1970 Vienna	4×200 m
Bronze medal – third place	1971 Sofia	400 m
Bronze medal – third place	1972 Grenoble	4×180 m
Summer Universiade
Gold medal – first place	1970 Turin	400m
Silver medal – second place	1970 Turin	800m

Maria Sykora (born 11 October 1946) is an Austrian sprinter. She competed in the women's 400 metres at the 1972 Summer Olympics. She also competed in handball at the 1984 Summer Olympics.

She is the sister of Austrian athlete and Politician Liese Sykora and the aunt of the former Austrian handball player Karin Prokop and Austrian Skier Thomas Sykora.
