= Bernadette Martin =

French runner

Personal information
- Nationality: France
- Born: 13 September 1951 (age 74) Grenoble, France

Sport
- Event(s): 400 metres, 800 metres
Medal record
Women's athletics
Representing France
European Championships
Silver medal – second place	1969 Athens	4×400 m
European Indoor Championships
Bronze medal – third place	1972 Grenoble	4×360 m

Bernadette Martin (born 13 September 1951) is a former French athlete, who specialised in the 400 metres and 800 metres.

She won the silver medal in the 4 × 400 metres relay during the 1969 European Athletics Championships alongside Éliane Jacq, Nicole Duclos and Colette Besson. The French team went faster than the world record in the discipline in 3:30.8, but placed second and was tipped, in a photo finish, for first by the United Kingdom, who ran the same time. She participated in 1972 Summer Olympics, at Munich, and took fourth in the final of the 4 × 400 m (3:27.5 min: a new French record).

Her personal bests were 53.3 seconds in the 400 m (1971), and 2:02.49 minutes in the 800 m (1982).

== International competitions ==
Year	Competition	Venue	Position	Event	Notes
1969	European Championships	Athens, Greece	2nd	4 × 400 m	
1972	Olympic Games	Munich, Germany	4th	4 × 400 m	
