= Colette Besson =

French sprinter

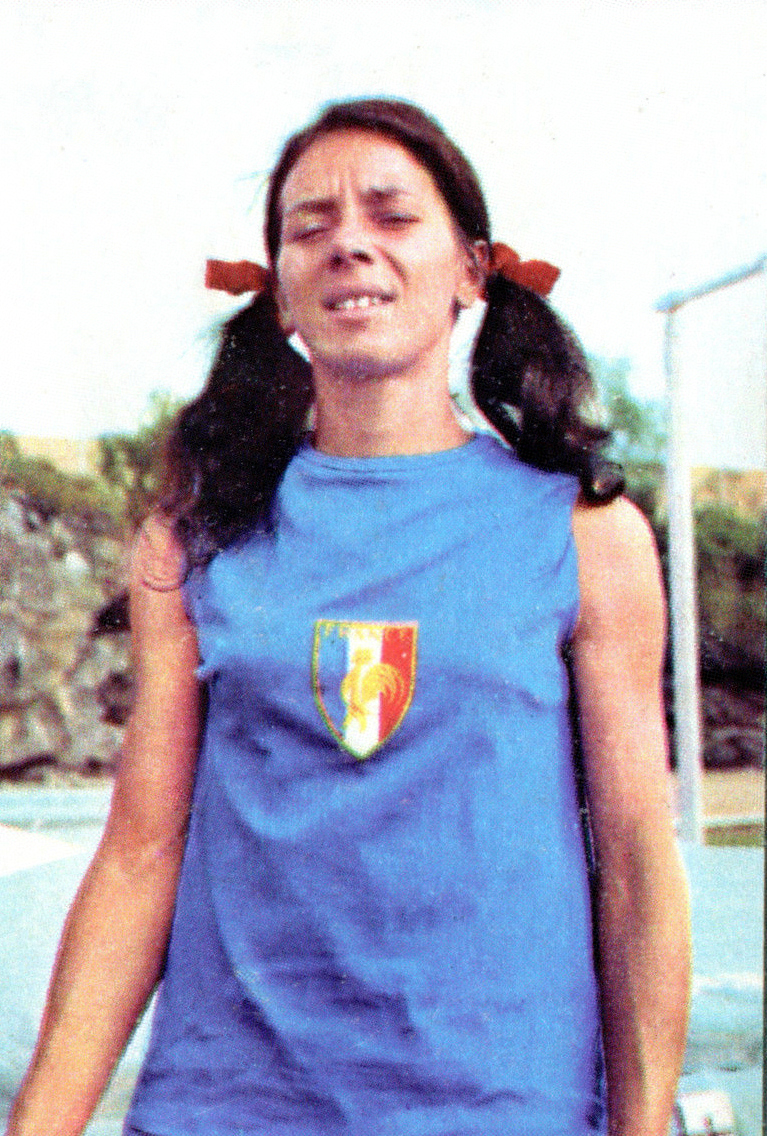
- Besson in 1968

Personal information
- Full name: Colette Henriette Besson
- Born: 7 April 1946 Saint-Georges-de-Didonne, France
- Died: 9 August 2005 (aged 59) Angoulins, France
- Height: 1.69 m (5 ft 7 in)
- Weight: 58 kg (128 lb)

Sport
- Sport: Athletics
- Events: 200 m, 400 m, 800 m
- Club: Bordeaux EC

Achievements and titles
- Personal bests: 200 m – 23.4 (1969); 400 m – 51.79 (1969); 800 m – 2:03.3 (1971)
Medal record
Women's athletics
Representing France
Olympic Games
Gold medal – first place	1968 Mexico City	400 m
European Championships
Silver medal – second place	1969 Athens	400 m
Silver medal – second place	1969 Athens	4×400 m
European Indoor Championships
Gold medal – first place	1970 Vienna	Medley relay
Silver medal – second place	1973 Rotterdam	4×340 m
Bronze medal – third place	1970 Vienna	400 m
Bronze medal – third place	1972 Grenoble	4×360 m
Mediterranean Games
Gold medal – first place	1971 Izmir	400 m

Colette Henriette Besson (7 April 1946 – 9 August 2005) was a French athlete, the surprise winner of the 400 m at the 1968 Summer Olympics in Mexico City.

== Athletic career ==
Prior to the 1968 Olympics, Besson, an unknown physical education teacher, qualified for the 400 m event. In the final, Britain's Lillian Board – the favourite for the gold – was way ahead of the rest of the field with 100 m to go. Besson moved up from fifth place to beat Board on the finish line by a tenth of a second. Her winning time of 52.03 seconds was 1.8 seconds better than her previous personal best.

The next year, Besson came close to winning another international title at the European Championships. In the 400 m final, she crossed the line almost level with her teammate Nicole Duclos, both in the world record time of 51.7. Duclos was awarded the victory after examination of the photo finish. In the 4 × 400 m relay final, Besson, who was anchoring the French team, passed the finish line at the same moment as Lillian Board. Again, photo finish evidence determined Besson had come second.

After 1969, Besson did not win any more international medals. She qualified for the 1972 Summer Olympics in Munich, but was eliminated in the preliminaries, although she took fourth place in the relay. She retired from athletics in 1977.

== Death ==
Besson died on 9 August 2005 of cancer, two years after being diagnosed with the disease.
