= List of 100 metres national champions (women) =

Below a list of all national champions in the women's 100 metres in track and field from several countries since 1970.

== Argentina ==
- 1970: Elba Martín
- 1971: Liliana Cragno
- 1972: Liliana Cragno
- 1973: Liliana Cragno
- 1974: Belkis Fava
- 1975: Beatriz Allocco
- 1976: Beatriz Allocco
- 1977: Beatriz Allocco
- 1978: Beatriz Allocco
- 1979: Belkis Fava
- 1980: Adriana Pero
- 1981: Marisol Besada
- 1982: Adriana Pero
- 1983: Andrea Barabino
- 1984: Mirta Forgione
- 1985: Deborah Bell
- 1986: Deborah Bell
- 1987: Deborah Bell
- 1988: Laura de Falco
- 1989: Ana María Comaschi
- 1990: Denise Sharpe
- 1991: Anabella von Kesselstatt
- 1992: Ana María Comaschi
- 1993: Daniela Lebreo
- 1994: Daniela Lebreo
- 1995: Olga Conte
- 1996: Olga Conte
- 1997: Olga Conte
- 1998: Vanesa Vallejos
- 1999: Verónica Depaoli
- 2000: Vanesa Wohlgemutt
- 2001: Vanesa Wohlgemutt
- 2002: Vanesa Wohlgemutt
- 2003: Vanesa Wohlgemutt
- 2004: Vanesa Wohlgemutt
- 2005: Vanesa Wohlgemutt
- 2006: Liliana Tantucci

== Australia ==
- 1970: Raelene Boyle
- 1971: Raelene Boyle
- 1972: Raelene Boyle
- 1973: Raelene Boyle
- 1974: Denise Robertson
- 1975: Denise Robertson
- 1976: Raelene Boyle
- 1977: Raelene Boyle
- 1978: Denise Boyd
- 1979: Denise Boyd
- 1980: Denise Boyd
- 1981: Debbie Wells
- 1982: Helen Davey
- 1983: Diane Holden
- 1984: Debbie Wells
- 1985: Jenny Flaherty & Diane Holden
- 1986: Diane Holden
- 1987: Diane Holden
- 1988: Jane Flemming
- 1989: Suzanne Broadrick
- 1990: Jane Flemming
- 1991: Monique Dunstan
- 1992: Melinda Gainsford
- 1993: Melinda Gainsford
- 1994: Gwen Torrence (USA)
- 1995: Melinda Gainsford
- 1996: Cathy Freeman
- 1997: Melinda Gainsford-Taylor
- 1998: Melinda Gainsford-Taylor
- 1999: Lauren Hewitt
- 2000: Melinda Gainsford-Taylor
- 2001: Lauren Hewitt
- 2002: Lauren Hewitt
- 2003: Sharon Cripps
- 2004: Gloria Kemasuode (NGR)
- 2005: Sally McLellan
- 2006: Sally McLellan
- 2007: Sally McLellan
- 2008: Fiona Cullen
- 2009: Sally McLellan
- 2010: Melissa Breen
- 2011: Sally Pearson
- 2012: Melissa Breen
- 2013: Toea Wisil
- 2014: Sally Pearson
- 2015: Melissa Breen
- 2016: Melissa Breen
- 2017: Toea Wisil
- 2018: Riley Day
- 2019: Naa Anang
- 2020: not held
- 2021: Hana Basic
- 2022: Zoe Hobbs
- 2023 Torrie Lewis

== Belarus ==
- 1992: Natalya Zhuk
- 1993: Yelena Denishchik
- 1994: Natalya Vinogradova
- 1995: Natalya Safronnikova
- 1996: Natalya Safronnikova
- 1997: Natalya Safronnikova
- 1998: Natalya Safronnikova
- 1999: Natalya Safronnikova
- 2000: Tatyana Barashko
- 2001: Aksana Drahun
- 2002: Yuliya Bartsevich
- 2003: Alena Neumiarzhitskaya
- 2004: Aksana Drahun
- 2005: Natallia Solohub
- 2006: Alena Neumiarzhitskaya

== Belgium ==
- 1970: Francine Van Assche
- 1971: Francine Van Assche
- 1972: Lea Alaerts
- 1973: Lea Alaerts
- 1974: Véronique Colonval
- 1975: Lea Alaerts
- 1976: Lea Alaerts
- 1977: Lea Alaerts
- 1978: Katrien Hoeree
- 1979: Lea Alaerts
- 1980: Lea Alaerts
- 1981: Liliane Meganck
- 1982: Liliane Meganck
- 1983: Karin Verguts
- 1984: Ingrid Verbruggen
- 1985: Ingrid Verbruggen
- 1986: Tonia Oliviers
- 1987: Ingrid Verbruggen
- 1988: Ingrid Verbruggen
- 1989: Ingrid Verbruggen
- 1990: Anne Carrette
- 1991: Katrien Maenhout
- 1992: Valérie Denis
- 1993: Nancy Callaerts
- 1994: Sandrine Hennart
- 1995: Sandrine Hennart
- 1996: Kim Gevaert
- 1997: Nancy Callaerts
- 1998: Kim Gevaert
- 1999: Kim Gevaert
- 2000: Kim Gevaert
- 2001: Kim Gevaert
- 2002: Kim Gevaert
- 2003: Kim Gevaert
- 2004: Kim Gevaert
- 2005: Kim Gevaert
- 2006: Kim Gevaert
- 2007: Kim Gevaert
- 2008: Olivia Borlée
- 2009: Olivia Borlée
- 2010: Olivia Borlée
- 2011: Hanna Mariën
- 2012: Anne Zagré
- 2013: Anne Zagré
- 2014: Olivia Borlée
- 2015: Anne Zagré
- 2016: Olivia Borlée

== Brazil ==
- 1991: Claudette Alves Pina
- 1992: Claudette Alves Pina
- 1993: Cleide Amaral
- 1994: Cleide Amaral
- 1995: Cleide Amaral
- 1996: Lucimar de Moura
- 1997: Lucimar de Moura
- 1998: Kátia de Jesus Santos
- 1999: Lucimar de Moura
- 2000: Lucimar de Moura
- 2001: Lucimar de Moura
- 2002: Kátia de Jesus Santos
- 2003: Lucimar de Moura
- 2004: Lucimar de Moura
- 2005: Lucimar de Moura

== Canada ==
- 1970: Patty Loverock
- 1971: Stephanie Berto
- 1972: Patty Loverock
- 1973: Marjorie Bailey
- 1974: Marjorie Bailey
- 1975: Patty Loverock
- 1976: Patty Loverock
- 1977: Margot Howe
- 1978: Patty Loverock
- 1979: Angella Taylor
- 1980: Angella Taylor
- 1981: Angella Taylor
- 1982: Angella Taylor
- 1983: Angella Taylor
- 1984: Angella Taylor
- 1985: Angela Bailey
- 1986: Angella Taylor-Issajenko
- 1987: Angella Taylor-Issajenko
- 1988: Angella Taylor-Issajenko
- 1989: France Gareau
- 1990: Angela Bailey
- 1991: Karen Clarke
- 1992: Angella Taylor-Issajenko
- 1993: Karen Clarke
- 1994: Simone Tomlinson
- 1995: Karen Clarke
- 1996: Tamara Perry
- 1997: Philomena Mensah
- 1998: Philomena Mensah
- 1999: Philomena Mensah
- 2000: Esi Benyarku
- 2001: Venolyn Clarke
- 2002: Atia Weekes
- 2003: Erica Witter
- 2004: Krysha Bailey
- 2005: Toyin Olupona
- 2006: Genevieve Thibault
- 2007: Toyin Olupona
- 2008: Toyin Olupona
- 2009: Toyin Olupona
- 2010: Toyin Olupona
- 2011: Crystal Emmanuel
- 2012: Phylicia George
- 2013: Crystal Emmanuel
- 2014: Crystal Emmanuel
- 2015: Khamica Bingham
- 2016: Crystal Emmanuel
- 2017: Crystal Emmanuel
- 2018: Crystal Emmanuel
- 2019: Crystal Emmanuel
- 2020:
- 2021: Crystal Emmanuel
- 2022: Khamica Bingham
- 2023: Khamica Bingham
- 2024: Audrey Leduc

== Denmark ==
- 1970: Birthe Pedersen
- 1971: Inge Jensen
- 1972: Inge Voigt
- 1973: Margit Hansen
- 1974: ???
- 1975: Birthe Pedersen
- 1976: Birthe Pedersen
- 1977: ???
- 1978: Dorthe A. Rasmussen
- 1979: Dorthe A. Rasmussen
- 1980: ???
- 1981: Dorthe A. Rasmussen
- 1982: ???
- 1983: Dorthe A. Rasmussen
- 1984: Dorthe A. Rasmussen
- 1985: Lene Demsitz
- 1986: Lene Demsitz
- 1987: Tine Nielsen
- 1988: Trine Bogner
- 1989: Lene Demsitz
- 1990: Wendy Slatanach (USA)
- 1991: Lisbeth Larsen
- 1992: Karen Gydesen
- 1993: Christina Schnohr
- 1994: Camilla Voigt
- 1995: Christina Schnohr
- 1996: Christina Schnohr
- 1997: Christina Schnohr
- 1998: Christina Schnohr
- 1999: Christina Schnohr
- 2000: Christina Schnohr
- 2001: Sille Søndergård
- 2002: Christina Schnohr
- 2003: Rikke Sørensen
- 2004: Rikke Sørensen
- 2005: Sabrina Søndergaard
- 2006: Maria Severin

== Estonia ==
- 1927: Sara Teitelbaum
- 1928: Sara Teitelbaum
- 1929: Sara Teitelbaum
- 1930: Sara Teitelbaum
- 1931: Sara Teitelbaum
- 1932: Taimo Kelder
- 1933: Gertrud Labrik
- 1934: Taimo Kelder
- 1935: Ilse Uus
- 1936: Henriette Israel
- 1937: Ilse Uus
- 1938: Ilse Uus
- 1939: Ilse Uus
- 1940: Ilse Uus
- 1941: -
- 1942: Karin Aviste
- 1943: Laine Hein
- 1944: Laine Hein
- 1945: Eugenia Laasik
- 1946: Eugenia Laasik
- 1947: Eugenia Laasik
- 1948: Eugenia Laasik
- 1949: Helve Karilaid
- 1950: Juta Sandbank
- 1951: Juta Sandbank
- 1952: Liivia Pütsepp
- 1953: Salme Tornius
- 1954: Liivia Pütsepp
- 1955: Salme Tornius
- 1956: Liivia Pütsepp
- 1957: Salme Tornius
- 1958: Liivia Härsing
- 1959: Liivia Härsing
- 1960: Liivia Härsing
- 1961: Liivia Härsing
- 1962: Liivia Härsing
- 1963: Liivia Härsing
- 1964: Tamara Palm
- 1965: Helgi Mägi
- 1966: Helgi Mägi
- 1967: Helle Volmer
- 1968: Hilju Lillo
- 1969: Helgi Mägi
- 1970: Marion Piisang
- 1971: Tiina Torop
- 1972: Galina Pavlova
- 1973: Tiina Torop
- 1974: Galina Schneider
- 1975: Irina Stehhina
- 1976: Taisi Pihela
- 1977: Sirje Põldma
- 1978: Merike Õunpuu
- 1979: Aili Alliksoo
- 1980: Saima Tiik
- 1981: Taimi Loov
- 1982: Saima Tiik
- 1983: Tatjana Petruškevitš
- 1984: Helle Kruuse
- 1985: Irina Vassiljeva
- 1986: Taimi Kõnn
- 1987: Irina Vassiljeva
- 1988: Riina Suhotskaja
- 1989: Riina Suhotskaja
- 1990: Riina Suhotskaja
- 1991: Anu Kaljurand
- 1992: Anu Kaljurand
- 1993: Rutti Luksepp
- 1994: Milena Alver
- 1995: Milena Alver
- 1996: Kertu Tiitso
- 1997: Rutti Luksepp
- 1998: Rutti Luksepp
- 1999: Rutti Luksepp
- 2000: Marianna Voronina
- 2001: Katrin Käärt
- 2002: Katrin Käärt
- 2003: Kadri Viigipuu
- 2004: Katrin Käärt
- 2005: Katrin Käärt
- 2006: Ksenija Balta
- 2007: Ksenija Balta
- 2008: Ksenija Balta
- 2009: Anita Maksimova
- 2010: Grit Šadeiko
- 2011: Grit Šadeiko
- 2012: Maarja Kalev
- 2013: Ksenija Balta
- 2014: Maarja Kalev
- 2015: Maarja Kalev
- 2016: Ksenija Balta
- 2017: Maarja Kalev
- 2018: Õilme Võro
- 2019: Õilme Võro
- 2020: Ksenija Balta
- 2021: Karoli Käärt
- 2022: Ann Marii Kivikas

== Finland ==
- 1970: Mona-Lisa Strandvall
- 1971: Tuula Rautanen
- 1972: Tuula Rautanen
- 1973: Mona-Lisa Pursiainen
- 1974: Mona-Lisa Pursiainen
- 1975: Mona-Lisa Pursiainen
- 1976: Mona-Lisa Pursiainen
- 1977: Mona-Lisa Pursiainen
- 1978: Helinä Laihorinne
- 1979: Helinä Laihorinne
- 1980: Riita Vesanen
- 1981: Helinä Laihorinne
- 1982: Helinä Laihorinne
- 1983: Helinä Marjamaa
- 1984: Helinä Marjamaa
- 1985: Sisko Markkanen
- 1986: Sisko Markkanen
- 1987: Auli Marttinen
- 1988: Sisko Hanhijoki
- 1989: Sisko Hanhijoki
- 1990: Sisko Hanhijoki
- 1991: Sisko Hanhijoki
- 1992: Sisko Hanhijoki
- 1993: Sanna Hernesniemi
- 1994: Sanna Hernesniemi
- 1995: Sanna Hernesniemi
- 1996: Sanna Hernesniemi
- 1997: Sanna Hernesniemi
- 1998: Sanna Kyllönen
- 1999: Sanna Kyllönen
- 2000: Heidi Hannula
- 2001: Johanna Manninen
- 2002: Johanna Manninen
- 2003: Johanna Manninen
- 2004: Johanna Manninen
- 2005: Heidi Hannula
- 2006: Heidi Hannula
- 2007: Johanna Manninen
- 2008: Sari Keskitalo
- 2009: Sari Keskitalo
- 2010: Sari Keskitalo
- 2011: Ella Räsänen
- 2012: Hanna-Maari Latvala
- 2013: Hanna-Maari Latvala
- 2014: Hanna-Maari Latvala

== France ==
- 1970: Sylviane Telliez
- 1971: Sylviane Telliez
- 1972: Sylviane Telliez
- 1973: Sylviane Telliez
- 1974: Sylviane Telliez
- 1975: Sylviane Telliez
- 1976: Chantal Réga
- 1977: Annie Alizé
- 1978: Chantal Réga
- 1979: Chantal Réga
- 1980: Chantal Réga
- 1981: Rose-Aimée Bacoul
- 1982: Rose-Aimée Bacoul
- 1983: Rose-Aimée Bacoul
- 1984: Marie-France Loval
- 1985: Marie-Christine Cazier
- 1986: Laurence Bily
- 1987: Laurence Bily
- 1988: Laurence Bily
- 1989: Laurence Bily
- 1990: Laurence Bily
- 1991: Marie-José Pérec
- 1992: Laurence Bily
- 1993: Valérie Jean-Charles
- 1994: Odiah Sidibé
- 1995: Odile Singa
- 1996: Odiah Sidibé
- 1997: Frédérique Bangué
- 1998: Frédérique Bangué
- 1999: Katia Benth
- 2000: Christine Arron
- 2001: Frédérique Bangué
- 2002: Sylviane Félix
- 2003: Christine Arron
- 2004: Christine Arron
- 2005: Sylvie Mballa Eloundou
- 2006: Véronique Mang
- 2007: Carima Louami
- 2008: Carima Louami
- 2009: Myriam Soumaré
- 2010: Véronique Mang
- 2011: Ruddy Zang-Milama (GAB)

== Germany ==
=== East Germany ===
- 1970: Renate Meissner
- 1971: Renate Stecher
- 1972: Evelin Kaufer
- 1973: Renate Stecher
- 1974: Renate Stecher
- 1975: Renate Stecher
- 1976: Monika Meyer
- 1977: Marlies Oelsner
- 1978: Marlies Göhr
- 1979: Marlies Göhr
- 1980: Marlies Göhr
- 1981: Marlies Göhr
- 1982: Marlies Göhr
- 1983: Marlies Göhr
- 1984: Marlies Göhr
- 1985: Marlies Göhr
- 1986: Silke Gladisch
- 1987: Silke Gladisch
- 1988: Marlies Göhr
- 1989: Katrin Krabbe
- 1990: Kerstin Behrendt

=== West Germany ===
- 1970: Ingrid Mickler
- 1971: Elfgard Schittenhelm
- 1972: Elfgard Schittenhelm
- 1973: Elfgard Schittenhelm
- 1974: Annegret Richter
- 1975: Inge Helten
- 1976: Annegret Richter
- 1977: Elvira Possekel
- 1978: Birgit Wilkes
- 1979: Annegret Richter
- 1980: Annegret Richter
- 1981: Monika Hirsch
- 1982: Resi März
- 1983: Sabine Klösters
- 1984: Heidi-Elke Gaugel
- 1985: Heidi-Elke Gaugel
- 1986: Heidi-Elke Gaugel
- 1987: Ulrike Sarvari
- 1988: Ulrike Sarvari
- 1989: Ulrike Sarvari
- 1990: Ulrike Sarvari

=== Unified Germany ===
- 1991: Katrin Krabbe
- 1992: Heike Drechsler
- 1993: Melanie Paschke
- 1994: Melanie Paschke
- 1995: Melanie Paschke
- 1996: Melanie Paschke
- 1997: Andrea Phillipp
- 1998: Andrea Phillipp
- 1999: Andrea Phillipp
- 2000: Esther Möller
- 2001: Gabi Rockmeier
- 2002: Sina Schielke
- 2003: Melanie Paschke
- 2004: Sina Schielke
- 2005: Birgit Rockmeier
- 2006: Verena Sailer
- 2007: Verena Sailer
- 2008: Verena Sailer
- 2009: Verena Sailer
- 2010: Verena Sailer
- 2011: Cathleen Tschirch
- 2012: Verena Sailer
- 2013: Verena Sailer
- 2014: Tatjana Pinto
- 2015: Verena Sailer

== Great Britain ==
- 1970: Anita Neil
- 1971: Anita Neil
- 1972: Della Pascoe
- 1973: Andrea Lynch
- 1974: Andrea Lynch
- 1975: Andrea Lynch
- 1976: Andrea Lynch
- 1977: Sonia Lannaman
- 1978: Kathy Smallwood
- 1979: Heather Hunte
- 1980: Kathy Smallwood
- 1981: Wendy Hoyte
- 1982: Wendy Hoyte
- 1983: Kathy Smallwood-Cook
- 1984: Kathy Smallwood-Cook
- 1985: Heather Oakes
- 1986: Paula Dunn
- 1987: Paula Dunn
- 1988: Paula Dunn
- 1989: Paula Dunn
- 1990: Stephi Douglas
- 1991: Stephi Douglas
- 1992: Stephi Douglas
- 1993: Beverly Kinch
- 1994: Katharine Merry
- 1995: Paula Thomas
- 1996: Stephi Douglas
- 1997: Donna Fraser
- 1998: Joice Maduaka
- 1999: Joice Maduaka
- 2000: Marcia Richardson
- 2001: Sarah Wilhelmy
- 2002: Joice Maduaka
- 2003: Joice Maduaka
- 2004: Abiodun Oyepitan
- 2005: Laura Turner
- 2006: Joice Maduaka

== India ==
- 1988: Zenia Ayrton
- 1989: P.T. Usha
- 1990: Ashwini Nachappa
- 1991: Ashwini Nachappa
- 1992: Zenia Ayrton
- 1993: Zenia Ayrton
- 1994: ???
- 1995: ???
- 1996: E.B. Shyla
- 1997: ???
- 1998: Rachita Mistry
- 1999: P.T. Usha
- 2000: Saraswati Dey
- 2001: Kavitha Pandya
- 2002: Saraswati Saha
- 2003: Saraswati Saha
- 2004: Poonam Tomar
- 2005: Poonam Tomar

== Italy ==
- 1927: Luigia Bonfanti
- 1928: Margherita Scolari
- 1929: not held
- 1930: Giovanna Viarengo
- 1931: Giovanna Viarengo (2)
- 1932: Claudia Testoni
- 1933: Ondina Valla
- 1934: Fernanda Bullano
- 1935: Fernanda Bullano (2)
- 1936: Ondina Valla (2)
- 1937: Claudia Testoni (2)
- 1938: Maria Alfero
- 1939: Italia Lucchini
- 1940: Claudia Testoni (3)
- 1941: Italia Lucchini (2)
- 1942: Italia Lucchini (3)
- 1943: Ines Bessanello
- 1944–1945: not held
- 1946: Mirella Avalle
- 1947: Mirella Avalle (2)
- 1948: Liliana Tagliaferri
- 1949: Liliana Tagliaferri (2)
- 1950: Laura Sivi
- 1951: Vittoria Cesarini
- 1952: Giuseppina Leone
- 1953: Giuseppina Leone (2)
- 1954: Giuseppina Leone (3)
- 1955: Giuseppina Leone (4)
- 1956: Giuseppina Leone (5)
- 1957: Giuseppina Leone (6)
- 1958: Giuseppina Leone (7)
- 1959: Giuseppina Leone (8)
- 1960: Giuseppina Leone (9)
- 1961: Donata Govoni
- 1962: Donata Govoni (2)
- 1963: Donata Govoni (3)
- 1964: Giovanna Carboncini
- 1965: Donata Govoni (4)
- 1966: Donata Govoni (5)
- 1967: Donata Govoni (6)
- 1968: Cecilia Molinari
- 1969: Donata Govoni (7)
- 1970: Cecilia Molinari (2)
- 1971: Cecilia Molinari (3)
- 1972: Cecilia Molinari (4)
- 1973: Cecilia Molinari (5)
- 1974: Cecilia Molinari (6)
- 1975: Rita Bottiglieri
- 1976: Rita Bottiglieri (2)
- 1977: Rita Bottiglieri (3)
- 1978: Laura Miano
- 1979: Laura Miano (2)
- 1980: Marisa Masullo
- 1981: Marisa Masullo (2)
- 1982: Marisa Masullo (3)
- 1983: Marisa Masullo (4)
- 1984: Marisa Masullo (5)
- 1985: Marisa Masullo (6)
- 1986: Rossella Tarolo
- 1987: Marisa Masullo (7)
- 1988: Marisa Masullo (8)
- 1989: Sonia Vigati
- 1990: Marisa Masullo (9)
- 1991: Marisa Masullo (10)
- 1992: Marisa Masullo (11)
- 1993: Giada Gallina
- 1994: Giada Gallina (2)
- 1995: Giada Gallina (3)
- 1996: Maria Ruggeri
- 1997: Giada Gallina (4)
- 1998: Elena Sordelli
- 1999: Manuela Levorato
- 2000: Francesca Cola
- 2001: Manuela Levorato (2)
- 2002: Manuela Levorato (3)
- 2003: Daniela Graglia
- 2004: Vincenza Calì
- 2005: Vincenza Calì (2)
- 2006: Elena Sordelli (2)
- 2007: Anita Pistone
- 2008: Anita Pistone (2)
- 2009: Anita Pistone (3)
- 2010: Manuela Levorato (4)
- 2011: Ilenia Draisci
- 2012: Audrey Alloh
- 2013: Gloria Hooper
- 2014: Irene Siragusa
- 2015: Gloria Hooper
- 2016: Gloria Hooper
- 2017: Irene Siragusa
- 2018: Johanelis Herrera

== Jamaica ==
- 1983: Lelieth Hodges
- 1984: Grace Jackson
- 1985: ???
- 1986: Camille Coates
- 1987: Vivienne Spence
- 1988: Merlene Ottey
- 1989: Andria Lloyd
- 1990: Juliet Campbell
- 1991: Merlene Ottey
- 1992: Juliet Cuthbert
- 1993: Merlene Ottey
- 1994: Dahlia Duhaney
- 1995: Merlene Ottey
- 1996: Merlene Ottey
- 1997: Merlene Ottey
- 1998: Beverly McDonald
- 1999: Peta-Gaye Dowdie
- 2000: Peta-Gaye Dowdie
- 2001: Aleen Bailey
- 2002: Veronica Campbell
- 2003: Aleen Bailey
- 2004: Veronica Campbell
- 2005: Veronica Campbell
- 2006: Sherone Simpson
- 2007: Veronica Campbell
- 2008: Kerron Stewart
- 2009: Shelly-Ann Fraser
- 2010: Sherone Simpson
- 2011: Veronica Campbell Brown
- 2012: Shelly-Ann Fraser-Pryce
- 2013: Kerron Stewart
- 2014: Veronica Campbell Brown
- 2015: Shelly-Ann Fraser-Pryce
- 2016: Elaine Thompson
- 2017: Elaine Thompson
- 2018: Elaine Thompson
- 2019: Elaine Thompson
- 2021: Shelly-Ann Fraser-Pryce
- 2022: Shericka Jackson
- 2023: Shericka Jackson

== Japan ==
The information taken from JAAF website.

- 1970: Keiko Yamada
- 1971: Keiko Yamada
- 1972: Keiko Yamada
- 1973: Keiko Yamada
- 1974: Emiko Konishi
- 1975: Yukiko Osako
- 1976: Yukiko Osako
- 1977: Emiko Konishi
- 1978: Keiko Yamada
- 1979: Sumiko Kaibara
- 1980: Yukiko Osako
- 1981: Hiromi Isozaki
- 1982: Emiko Konishi
- 1983: Emiko Konishi
- 1984: Emiko Konishi
- 1985: Emiko Konishi
- 1986: Emiko Konishi
- 1987: Mikako Eguchi
- 1988: Etsuko Hara
- 1989: Toshie Kitada
- 1990: Madoka Miki
- 1991: Pauline Davis
- 1992: Ayako Nomura
- 1993: Ayako Nomura
- 1994: Toshie Kitada
- 1995: Toshie Kitada
- 1996: Toshie Kitada
- 1997: Kaori Yoshida
- 1998: Motoko Arai
- 1999: Motoko Arai
- 2000: Motoko Arai
- 2001: Motoko Arai
- 2002: Motoko Arai
- 2003: Motoko Arai
- 2004: Motoko Kojima & Kaori Sakagami
- 2005: Tomoko Ishida
- 2006: Sakie Nobuoka
- 2007: Momoko Takahashi
- 2008: Chisato Fukushima
- 2009: Momoko Takahashi
- 2010: Chisato Fukushima
- 2011: Chisato Fukushima
- 2012: Chisato Fukushima
- 2013: Chisato Fukushima
- 2014: Chisato Fukushima
- 2015: Chisato Fukushima
- 2016: Chisato Fukushima
- 2017: Kana Ichikawa
- 2018: Nodoka Seko
- 2019: Midori Mikase

== Latvia ==
- 1991: Marina Smirnova
- 1992: Ludmila Olijara
- 1993: Ludmila Olijara
- 1994: Ludmila Olijara
- 1995: Valentīna Gotovska
- 1996: Alina Novikova
- 1997: Jelena Savilova
- 1998: Jelena Savilova
- 1999: Inese Petruna
- 2000: Zanda Grava
- 2001: Margarita Bondarenko
- 2002: Inese Petruna
- 2003: Anita Kozica
- 2004: Anita Kozica
- 2005: Olga Mirzagitova
- 2006: Zanda Grava
- 2007: ???
- 2008: Ieva Zunda
- 2009: Jekaterina Čekele
- 2010: Jekaterina Čekele

== Lithuania ==
- 1990: Ilona Karopcikiené
- 1991: Ilona Karopcikiené
- 1992: Ilona Karopcikiené
- 1993: Audroné Mockeviciûté
- 1994: Dina Makarenko
- 1995: Agné Visockaité
- 1996: Agné Visockaité
- 1997: Agné Visockaité
- 1998: Agné Visockaité
- 1999: Audra Dagelyté
- 2000: Audra Dagelyté
- 2001: Audra Dagelyté
- 2002: Agné Visockaité
- 2003: Agné Eggerth
- 2004: Agné Eggerth
- 2005: Audra Dagelyté
- 2006: Lina Grinčikaitė
- 2007: Audra Dagelyté
- 2008: Lina Grinčikaitė
- 2009: Lina Grinčikaitė
- 2010: Lina Grinčikaitė

== Netherlands ==
- 1970: Wilma van den Berg
- 1971: Wilma van den Berg
- 1972: Wilma van Gool
- 1973: Elly van Lienen
- 1974: Wilma van Gool
- 1975: Mieke van Wissen
- 1976: Wilma van Gool
- 1977: Elly Henzen
- 1978: Elly Henzen
- 1979: Els Vader
- 1980: Els Vader
- 1981: Els Vader
- 1982: Els Vader
- 1983: Nelli Cooman
- 1984: Els Vader
- 1985: Nelli Cooman
- 1986: Nellie Fiere-Cooman
- 1987: Claudia Ellissen
- 1988: Nellie Fiere-Cooman
- 1989: Marjan Olyslager
- 1990: Nellie Fiere-Cooman
- 1991: Nelli Cooman
- 1992: Nelli Cooman
- 1993: Jacqueline Poelman
- 1994: Jacqueline Poelman
- 1995: Jacqueline Poelman
- 1996: Mami Awuah Asante
- 1997: Jacqueline Poelman
- 1998: Mami Awuah Asante
- 1999: Jacqueline Poelman
- 2000: Jacqueline Poelman
- 2001: Jacqueline Poelman
- 2002: Jacqueline Poelman
- 2003: Jacqueline Poelman
- 2004: Joan van den Akker
- 2005: Jacqueline Poelman
- 2006: Jacqueline Poelman
- 2007: Pascal van Assendelft
- 2008: Femke van der Meij
- 2009: Jamile Samuel
- 2010: Femke van der Meij
- 2011: Dafne Schippers
- 2012: Dafne Schippers
- 2013: Madiea Ghafoor
- 2014: Dafne Schippers
- 2015: Dafne Schippers
- 2016: Naomi Sedney

== New Zealand ==
- 1970: Penny Hunt
- 1971: Wendy Urquhart
- 1972: Brenda Matthews
- 1973: Wendy Brown
- 1974: Wendy Brown
- 1975: Penny Hunt
- 1976: Sue Jowett
- 1977: Kim Robertson
- 1978: Kim Robertson
- 1979: Kim Robertson
- 1980: Kim Robertson
- 1981: Wendy Brown
- 1982: Kim Robertson
- 1983: Kim Robertson
- 1984: Andrea Wade
- 1985: Andrea Wade
- 1986: Bev Peterson
- 1987: Andrea Wade
- 1988: Bev Peterson
- 1989: Bev Peterson
- 1990: Briar Toop
- 1991: Michelle Seymour
- 1992: Michelle Seymour
- 1993: Michelle Seymour
- 1994: Michelle Seymour
- 1995: Chantal Brunner
- 1996: Chantal Brunner
- 1997: Jane Arnott
- 1998: Jane Arnott
- 1999: Caro Hunt
- 2000: Caro Hunt
- 2001: Chantal Brunner
- 2002: Caro Hunt
- 2003: Caro Hunt
- 2004: Chantal Brunner
- 2005: Chantal Brunner
- 2006: Chantal Brunner
- 2007: Monique Williams
- 2008: Monique Williams
- 2009: Monique Williams
- 2010: Anna Smythe
- 2011: Andrea Koenen
- 2012: Monique Williams
- 2013: Mariah Ririnui
- 2014: Fiona Morrison
- 2015: Kelsey Berryman
- 2016: Rochelle Coster
- 2017: Zoe Hobbs
- 2018: Zoe Hobbs
- 2019: Zoe Hobbs
- 2020: Zoe Hobbs
- 2021: Zoe Hobbs
- 2022: Zoe Hobbs
- 2023: Zoe Hobbs

== Norway ==
- 1970: Tone Svarstad
- 1971: Eva Seim
- 1972: Eva Seim
- 1973: Eva Seim
- 1974: Nina Liverød
- 1975: Eva Seim
- 1976: Turid Bjørkli
- 1977: Mona Evjen
- 1978: Mona Evjen
- 1979: Mona Evjen
- 1980: Mona Evjen
- 1981: Mona Evjen
- 1982: Mona Evjen
- 1983: Mona Evjen
- 1984: Mona Evjen
- 1985: Mette Husbyn
- 1986: Sølvi Olsen
- 1987: Mette Husbyn
- 1988: Sølvi Olsen
- 1989: Mette Husbyn & Sølvi Olsen
- 1990: Sølvi Olsen
- 1991: Sølvi Olsen
- 1992: Anette Dave
- 1993: Sølvi Meinseth
- 1994: Ingvild Larsen
- 1995: Ingvild Larsen
- 1996: Marit Nyberg Birknes
- 1997: Marit Nyberg Birknes
- 1998: Marit Nyberg Birknes
- 1999: Sigvor Melve
- 2000: Ann Helen Rinden
- 2001: Inger Elisabeth Tørre
- 2002: Marit Nyberg
- 2003: Ann Helen Rinden
- 2004: Anne Cathrine Bakken
- 2005: Ezinne Okparaebo
- 2006: Ezinne Okparaebo
- 2007: Ezinne Okparaebo
- 2008: Ezinne Okparaebo
- 2009: Ezinne Okparaebo

== Poland ==
- 1970: Helena Kerner
- 1971: Helena Flisnik
- 1972: Irena Szewińska
- 1973: Irena Szewińska
- 1974: Irena Szewińska
- 1975: Ewa Długolecka
- 1976: Malgorzata Bogucka
- 1977: Malgorzata Bogucka
- 1978: Grażyna Rabsztyn
- 1979: Irena Szewinska
- 1980: Zofia Bielcyk
- 1981: Iwona Pakula
- 1982: Iwona Pakula
- 1983: Anna Slipiko
- 1984: Elżbieta Tomczak
- 1985: Elżbieta Tomczak
- 1986: Ewa Kasprzyk
- 1987: Jolanta Janota
- 1988: Ewa Pisiewicz
- 1989: Joanna Smolarek
- 1990: Joanna Smolarek
- 1991: Joanna Smolarek
- 1992: Joanna Smolarek
- 1993: Dorota Krawczak
- 1994: Izabela Czajko
- 1995: Kinga Leszczyńska
- 1996: Kinga Leszczyńska
- 1997: Anna Leszczyńska
- 1998: Kinga Leszczyńska
- 1999: Zuzanna Radecka
- 2000: Zuzanna Radecka
- 2001: Agnieszka Rysiukiewicz
- 2002: Beata Szkudlarz
- 2003: Daria Onyśko
- 2004: Daria Onyśko
- 2005: Daria Onyśko
- 2006: Daria Onyśko
- 2007: Daria Korczyńska
- 2008: Daria Korczyńska
- 2009: Marika Popowicz
- 2010: Weronika Wedler
- 2011: Marika Popowicz
- 2012: Daria Korczyńska
- 2013: Marika Popowicz
- 2014: Anna Kiełbasińska
- 2015: Marika Popowicz
- 2016: Ewa Swoboda
- 2017: Ewa Swoboda
- 2018: Ewa Swoboda
- 2019: Ewa Swoboda

== Portugal ==
- 1970: Angélica Manaca Dias
- 1971: Júlia Moisão
- 1972: Maria José Sobral
- 1973: Angélica Manaca Dias
- 1974: Angélica Manaca Dias
- 1975: Maria José Sobral
- 1976: Vera Lisa
- 1977: Vera Lisa
- 1978: Vera Lisa
- 1979: Maria João Lopes
- 1980: Maria João Lopes
- 1981: Maria João Lopes
- 1982: Virgínia Gomes
- 1983: Virgínia Gomes
- 1984: Vera Lisa
- 1985: Cláudia Gomes
- 1986: Virgínia Gomes
- 1987: Cláudia Gomes
- 1988: Virgínia Gomes
- 1989: Virgínia Gomes
- 1990: Carmo Prazeres
- 1991: Virgínia Gomes
- 1992: Virgínia Gomes
- 1993: Lucrécia Jardim
- 1994: Carmo Tavares
- 1995: Sandra Castanheira
- 1996: Christina Regalo
- 1997: Lucrécia Jardim
- 1998: Lucrécia Jardim
- 1999: Carmo Tavares
- 2000: Severina Cravid
- 2001: Severina Cravid
- 2002: Severina Cravid
- 2003: Severina Cravid
- 2004: Rafaela Almeida & Patrícia Lopes
- 2005: Carla Tavares
- 2006: Sónia Tavares
- 2007: Sónia Tavares
- 2008: Sónia Tavares
- 2009: Carla Tavares
- 2010: Carla Tavares
- 2011: Sónia Tavares
- 2012: Eva Vital

== Russia ==
- 1992: Natalya Voronova
- 1993: Natalya Voronova
- 1994: Natalya Voronova
- 1995: Yekaterina Leshchova
- 1996: Galina Malchugina
- 1997: Yekaterina Leshchova
- 1998: Oksana Ekk
- 1999: Irina Privalova
- 2000: Natalya Ignatova
- 2001: Yekaterina Leshchova
- 2002: Marina Kislova
- 2003: Yuliya Tabakova
- 2004: Yuliya Tabakova
- 2005: Olga Fyodorova
- 2006: Yekaterina Grigoryeva

== Spain ==
- 1970: Pilar Fanlo
- 1971: María Margarita Martínez
- 1972: Lourdes Valdor
- 1973: Pilar Fanlo
- 1974: Ela Cifuentes
- 1975: Yolanda Oroz
- 1976: Ela Cifuentes
- 1977: Yolanda Oroz
- 1978: Loles Vives
- 1979: Lourdes Valdor
- 1980: Lourdes Valdor
- 1981: Mercedes Cano
- 1982: Teresa Rioné
- 1983: Teresa Rioné
- 1984: Teresa Rioné
- 1985: Blanca Lacambra
- 1986: Blanca Lacambra
- 1987: Yolanda Díaz
- 1988: Sandra Myers
- 1989: Yolanda Díaz
- 1990: Cristina Castro
- 1991: Cristina Castro
- 1992: Cristina Castro
- 1993: Patricia Morales
- 1994: Cristina Castro
- 1995: Carme Blay
- 1996: Cristina Castro
- 1997: Carme Blay
- 1998: Arancha Iglesias
- 1999: Arancha Iglesias
- 2000: Carme Blay
- 2001: Carme Blay
- 2002: Carme Blay
- 2003: Carme Blay
- 2004: Arancha Iglesias
- 2005: Belén Recio
- 2006: Belén Recio
- 2007: Belén Recio
- 2008: Belén Recio
- 2009: Digna Luz Murillo
- 2010: Digna Luz Murillo
- 2011: Digna Luz Murillo
- 2012: Concepción Montaner

== Sweden ==
- 1970: Karin Lundgren
- 1971: Karin Lundgren
- 1972: Margaretha Larsson
- 1973: Margaretha Lövgren
- 1974: Linda Haglund
- 1975: Linda Haglund
- 1976: Linda Haglund
- 1977: Linda Haglund
- 1978: Linda Haglund
- 1979: Linda Haglund
- 1980: Anne-Louise Skoglund
- 1981: Linda Haglund
- 1982: Lena Möller
- 1983: Lena Möller
- 1984: Maria Fernström
- 1985: Maria Fernström
- 1986: Lena Möller
- 1987: Maria Fernström
- 1988: Maria Fernström
- 1989: Gunilla Ascard
- 1990: Victoria Ljungberg
- 1991: Gunilla Ascard
- 1992: Maria Staafgård
- 1993: Marika Johansson
- 1994: Therese Olofsson
- 1995: Therese Olofsson
- 1996: Therese Olofsson
- 1997: Annika Amundin
- 1998: Jenny Kallur
- 1999: Annika Amundin
- 2000: Annika Amundin
- 2001: Annika Amundin
- 2002: Jenny Kallur
- 2003: Carolina Klüft
- 2004: Carolina Klüft
- 2005: Susanna Kallur
- 2006: Daniela Lincoln-Saavedra

== Ukraine ==
- 1992: Anzhelika Shevchuk
- 1993: Irina Slyusar
- 1994: Zhanna Tarnopolskaya
- 1995: Zhanna Pintusevich
- 1996: Iryna Pukha
- 1997: Anzhela Kravchenko
- 1998: Anzhela Kravchenko
- 1999: Anzhela Kravchenko
- 2000: Anzhela Kravchenko
- 2001: Anzhela Kravchenko
- 2002: Anzhela Kravchenko
- 2003: Olena Pastushenko
- 2004: Iryna Kozhemyakina
- 2005: Iryna Shtanhyeyeva
- 2006: Nataliya Pohrebnyak
- 2007: Iryna Shtanhyeyeva
- 2008: Nataliya Pohrebnyak
- 2009: Nataliya Pohrebnyak
- 2010: Olesya Povh
- 2011: Viktoriya Kashcheyeva
- 2012: Olesya Povh
- 2013: Nataliya Pohrebnyak
- 2014: Nataliya Pohrebnyak
- 2015: Nataliya Pohrebnyak
- 2016: Nataliya Pohrebnyak
- 2017: Hanna Plotitsyna
- 2018: Khrystyna Stuy
- 2019: Viktoriya Ratnikova
- 2020: Yana Kachur

== United States ==
- 1923: Frances Ruppert
- 1924: Frances Ruppert
- 1925: Helen Filkey
- 1926: Rosa Grosse
- 1927: Elta Cartwright
- 1928^{OT}: Elta Cartwright
- 1929: Betty Robinson
- 1930: Stella Walsh
- 1931: Eleanor Egg
- 1932^{OT}: Wilhelmina von Bremen
- 1933: Annette Rogers
- 1934: not held
- 1935: Helen Stephens
- 1936: Helen Stephens
- 1937: Claire Isicson
- 1938: Lula Hymes
- 1939: Olive Hasenfus
- 1940: Jean Lane
- 1941: Jean Lane
- 1942: Alice Coachman
- 1943: Stella Walsh
- 1944: Stella Walsh
- 1945: Alice Coachman
- 1946: Alice Coachman
- 1947: Juanita Watson
- 1948: Stella Walsh
- 1949: Jean Patton
- 1950: Jean Patton
- 1951: Mary McNabb
- 1952: Catherine Hardy
- 1953: Barbara Jones
- 1954: Barbara Jones
- 1955: Mae Faggs
- 1956: Mae Faggs
- 1957: Barbara Jones
- 1958: Margaret Mathews
- 1959: Wilma Rudolph
- 1960: Wilma Rudolph
- 1961: Wilma Rudolph
- 1962: Wilma Rudolph
- 1963: Edith McGuire
- 1965: Wyomia Tyus
- 1965: Wyomia Tyus
- 1966: Wyomia Tyus
- 1967: Barbara Ferrell
- 1968: Margaret Bailes
- 1969: Barbara Ferrell
- 1970: Chi Cheng (TPE)
- 1971: Iris Davis
- 1972: Alice Annum (GHA)
- 1973: Iris Davis
- 1974: Renaye Bowen
- 1975: Rosalyn Bryant
- 1976: Chandra Cheeseborough
- 1977: Evelyn Ashford
- 1978: Lilieth Hodges (JAM)
- 1979: Evelyn Ashford
- 1980: Alice Brown
- 1981: Evelyn Ashford
- 1982: Evelyn Ashford
- 1983: Evelyn Ashford
- 1984: Merlene Ottey (JAM)
- 1985: Merlene Ottey (JAM)
- 1986: Pam Marshall
- 1987: Diane Williams
- 1988: Sheila Echols
- 1989: Dawn Sowell
- 1990: Michelle Finn
- 1991: Carlette Guidry
- 1992:^{OT}Gwen Torrence
- 1993: Gail Devers
- 1994: Gail Devers
- 1995: Gwen Torrence
- 1996:^{OT}Gwen Torrence
- 1997: Marion Jones
- 1998: Marion Jones
- 1999: Inger Miller
- 2000:^{OT}Marion Jones
- 2001: Chryste Gaines
- 2002: Marion Jones
- 2003: Torri Edwards
- 2004:^{OT}LaTasha Colander
- 2005: Me'Lisa Barber
- 2006: Marion Jones
- 2007: Torri Edwards
- 2008:^{OT}Muna Lee
- 2009: Carmelita Jeter
- 2010: Allyson Felix
- 2011: Carmelita Jeter
- 2012:^{OT}Carmelita Jeter
- 2013: English Gardner
- 2014: Tianna Bartoletta
- 2015: Tori Bowie
- 2016: English Gardner
- 2017: Tori Bowie
- 2018: Aleia Hobbs
- 2019: Teahna Daniels
- 2021: Javianne Oliver
- 2023: Sha'Carri Richardson
- 2024: Sha'Carri Richardson

== See also ==
- List of 100 metres national champions (men)
