= Athletics at the 1976 Summer Olympics – Women's 4 × 100 metres relay =

These are the official results of the women's 4 × 100 metres relay event at the 1976 Summer Olympics in Montreal, Quebec, Canada. The event was held on 30 and 31 July 1976. There were a total number of 10 nations competing.

== Medalists ==
Gold	Silver	Bronze
East Germany; Marlies Oelsner; Renate Stecher; Carla Bodendorf; Bärbel Eckert	West Germany; Elvira Possekel; Inge Helten; Annegret Richter; Annegret Kroniger	Soviet Union; Tatyana Prorochenko; Lyudmila Maslakova; Nadezhda Besfamilnaya; Vera Anisimova

== Records ==
These were the standing World and Olympic records (in seconds) prior to the 1976 Summer Olympics.

World record	42.50	(East Germany) Marlies Oelsner (East Germany) Renate Stecher (East Germany) Carla Bodendorf (East Germany) Martina Blos	Karl-Marx-Stadt (GDR)	June 29, 1974
Olympic record	42.88	(United States) Margaret Bailes (United States) Barbara Ferrell (United States) Mildrette Netter (United States) Wyomia Tyus	Mexico City (MEX)	October 20, 1968

== Results ==
=== Final ===
- Held on Saturday 31 July 1976

RANK	NATION	ATHLETES	TIME
Gold medal	East Germany	• Marlies Oelsner • Renate Stecher • Carla Bodendorf • Bärbel Eckert	42.55 (OR)
Silver medal	West Germany	• Elvira Possekel • Inge Helten • Annegret Richter • Annegret Kroniger	42.59
Bronze medal	Soviet Union	• Tatyana Prorochenko • Lyudmila Maslakova • Nadezhda Besfamilnaya • Vera Anisimova	43.09
4.	Canada	• Margaret Howe • Patty Loverock • Joanne McTaggart • Marjorie Bailey	43.17 CWR, NR
5.	Australia	• Barbara Wilson • Debbie Wells • Denise Robertson • Raelene Boyle	43.18 NR
6.	Jamaica	• Leleith Hodges • Rose Allwood • Carol Cummings • Jacqueline Pusey	43.24
7.	United States	• Martha Watson • Evelyn Ashford • Debra Armstrong • Chandra Cheeseborough	43.35
8.	Great Britain	• Wendy Clarke • Denise Ramsden • Sharon Colyear • Andrea Lynch	43.79

=== Heats ===
- Held on Friday 30 July 1976

==== Heat 1 ====
RANK	NATION	ATHLETES	TIME
1.	West Germany	• Elvira Possekel • Inge Helten • Annegret Richter • Annegret Kroniger	42.61 (OR)
2.	Soviet Union	• Tatyana Prorochenko • Lyudmila Maslakova • Nadezhda Besfamilnaya • Vera Anisimova	43.33
3.	Great Britain	• Wendy Clarke • Denise Ramsden • Sharon Colyear • Andrea Lynch	43.44
4.	Australia	• Barbara Wilson • Debbie Wells • Denise Robertson • Raelene Boyle	43.67
5.	France	• Chantal Corbrejaud • Catherine Delachanal • Chantal Rega • Sylvie Telliez	43.95

==== Heat 2 ====
RANK	NATION	ATHLETES	TIME
1.	East Germany	• Marlies Oelsner • Renate Stecher • Carla Bodendorf • Bärbel Eckert	43.00
2.	United States	• Martha Watson • Evelyn Ashford • Debra Armstrong • Chandra Cheeseborough	43.46
3.	Canada	• Margaret Howe • Patty Loverock • Joanne McTaggart • Marjorie Bailey	43.53
4.	Jamaica	• Rose Allwood • Jacqueline Pusey • Carol Cummings • Leleith Hodges	43.88
5.	Cuba	• Isabel Taylor • Carmen Valdés • Fulgencia Romay • Silvia Chivás	44.29
