= Athletics at the 1976 Summer Olympics – Women's 200 metres =

Women's 200 metres at the Games of the XXI Olympiad
- Venue: Olympic Stadium
- Date: 26–28 July 1976
- Competitors: 36 from 21 nations
- Winning time: 22.37

Medalists
1st place, gold medalist(s)		Bärbel Eckert; East Germany
2nd place, silver medalist(s)		Annegret Richter; West Germany
3rd place, bronze medalist(s)		Renate Stecher; East Germany

The Women's 200 metres competition at the 1976 Summer Olympics in Montreal, Quebec, Canada was held at the Olympic Stadium on 26–28 July. The winning margin was 0.02 seconds.

== Competition format ==
The Women's 200m competition consisted of heats (Round 1), Quarterfinals, Semifinals and a Final. The five fastest competitors from each race in the heats plus the next two fastest overall qualified for the Quarterfinals. The four fastest competitors from each of the Quarterfinal races qualified for the Semifinals, where again the four fastest runners from each heat advanced to the final.

== Records ==
Prior to the competition, the existing World and Olympic records were as follows.

World record	Irena Szewińska (POL)	22.21	Potsdam, East Germany	13 June 1974
Olympic record	Renate Stecher (GDR)	22.40	Munich, East Germany	7 September 1972

== Results ==
=== Round 1 ===
Qual. rule: first 5 of each heat (Q) plus the two fastest times (q) qualified.

==== Heat 1 ====
Rank	Athlete	Nation	Time	Notes
1	Chandra Cheeseborough	United States	23.17	Q
2	Denise Boyd	Australia	23.23	Q
3	Rosie Allwood	Jamaica	23.34	Q
4	Marjorie Bailey	Canada	23.36	Q
5	Annegret Kroniger	West Germany	23.43	Q
6	Beverley Goddard	Great Britain	23.64	q
—	Isabel Taylor	Cuba	DNS	

==== Heat 2 ====
Rank	Athlete	Nation	Time	Notes
1	Bärbel Eckert	East Germany	23.78	Q
2	Sue Jowett	New Zealand	24.12	Q
3	Joanne McTaggert	Canada	24.35	Q
4	Freida Nicholls-Davy	Barbados	24.45	Q
—	Carmen Valdés	Cuba	DNS	
—	Brenda Morehead	United States	DNS	
—	Linda Haglund	Sweden	DNS	

==== Heat 3 ====
Rank	Athlete	Nation	Time	Notes
1	Raelene Boyle	Australia	23.12	Q
2	Nadezhda Besfamilnaya	Soviet Union	23.39	Q
3	Annegret Richter	West Germany	23.47	Q
4	Chantal Réga	France	23.54	Q
5	Silvia Schinzel	Austria	23.74	Q
6	Silvina Pereira da Silva	Brazil	24.00	
7	Carolina Rieuwpassa	Indonesia	24.86	
—	Tuisorisori Miriama	Fiji	DNS	

==== Heat 4 ====
Rank	Athlete	Nation	Time	Notes
1	Debra Armstrong	United States	23.18	Q
2	Catherine Delachanal	France	23.38	Q
3	Inge Helten	West Germany	23.40	Q
4	Lyudmila Maslakova	Soviet Union	23.51	Q
5	Lea Alaerts	Belgium	23.53	Q
6	Helen Golden	Great Britain	23.77	q
7	Helen Ritter	Liechtenstein	26.15	
8	Marie-Louise Pierre	Haiti	28.19	

==== Heat 5 ====
Rank	Athlete	Nation	Time	Notes
1	Carla Bodendorf	East Germany	22.98	Q
2	Jackie Pusey	Jamaica	23.56	Q
3	Debbie Wells	Australia	23.78	Q
4	Ildikó Erdélyi	Hungary	24.35	Q
5	Mona-Lisa Pursiainen	Finland	24.52	Q
—	Sonia Lannaman	Great Britain	DNS	
—	Rita Bottiglieri	Italy	DNS	

==== Heat 6 ====
Rank	Athlete	Nation	Time	Notes
1	Renate Stecher	East Germany	22.75	Q
2	Tatyana Prorochenko	Soviet Union	23.21	Q
3	Patty Loverock	Canada	23.34	Q
4	Liliyana Panayotova-Ivanova	Bulgaria	23.49	Q
5	Carol Cummings	Jamaica	23.50	Q
6	Divina Estrella	Dominican Republic	24.95	
—	Fulgencia Romay	Cuba	DNS	

=== Quarterfinals ===
==== Heat 1 ====
Rank	Athlete	Nation	Time	Notes
1	Carla Bodendorf	East Germany	23.20	Q
2	Debra Armstrong	United States	23.20	Q
3	Annegret Richter	West Germany	23.35	Q
4	Nadezhda Besfamilnaya	Soviet Union	23.48	Q
5	Debbie Wells	Australia	23.65	
6	Lea Alaerts	Belgium	23.80	
7	Liliyana Panayotova-Ivanova	Bulgaria	23.87	
8	Sue Jowett	New Zealand	24.23	

==== Heat 2 ====
Rank	Athlete	Nation	Time	Notes
1	Raelene Boyle	Australia	22.97	Q
2	Inge Helten	West Germany	23.09	Q
3	Tatyana Prorochenko	Soviet Union	23.11	Q
4	Chantal Réga	France	23.33	Q
5	Rosie Allwood	Jamaica	23.40	
6	Beverley Goddard	Great Britain	23.74	
7	Mona-Lisa Pursiainen	Finland	24.10	
8	Joanne McTaggert	Canada	24.47	

==== Heat 3 ====
Rank	Athlete	Nation	Time	Notes
1	Renate Stecher	East Germany	23.04	Q
2	Chandra Cheeseborough	United States	23.19	Q
3	Marjorie Bailey	Canada	23.24	Q
4	Jackie Pusey	Jamaica	23.42	Q
5	Catherine Delachanal	France	23.65	
6	Silvia Schinzel	Austria	23.95	
—	Annegret Kroniger	West Germany	DNS	

==== Heat 4 ====
Rank	Athlete	Nation	Time	Notes
1	Bärbel Eckert	East Germany	22.85	Q
2	Patty Loverock	Canada	23.03	Q, NR
3	Denise Boyd	Australia	23.12	Q
4	Carol Cummings	Jamaica	23.45	Q
5	Lyudmila Maslakova	Soviet Union	23.63	
6	Helen Golden	Great Britain	23.94	
7	Freida Nicholls-Davy	Barbados	24.27	
—	Ildikó Erdélyi	Hungary	DNS	

=== Semifinals ===
==== Heat 1 ====
Rank	Athlete	Nation	Time	Notes
1	Renate Stecher	East Germany	22.68	Q
2	Carla Bodendorf	East Germany	22.84	Q
3	Inge Helten	West Germany	22.97	Q
4	Tatyana Prorochenko	Soviet Union	23.03	Q
5	Marjorie Bailey	Canada	23.06	
6	Debra Armstrong	United States	23.16	
7	Carol Cummings	Jamaica	23.41	
—	Raelene Boyle	Australia	DSQ	

==== Heat 2 ====
Rank	Athlete	Nation	Time	Notes
1	Bärbel Eckert	East Germany	22.71	Q
2	Annegret Richter	West Germany	22.90	Q
3	Denise Boyd	Australia	22.91	Q
4	Chantal Réga	France	23.00	Q
5	Patty Loverock	Canada	23.09	
6	Chandra Cheeseborough	United States	23.20	
7	Jackie Pusey	Jamaica	23.31	
8	Nadezhda Besfamilnaya	Soviet Union	23.38	

=== Final ===
Rank	Athlete	Nation	Time	Notes
1st place, gold medalist(s)	Bärbel Eckert	East Germany	22.37	OR
2nd place, silver medalist(s)	Annegret Richter	West Germany	22.39	
3rd place, bronze medalist(s)	Renate Stecher	East Germany	22.47	
4	Carla Bodendorf	East Germany	22.64	
5	Inge Helten	West Germany	22.68	
6	Tatyana Prorochenko	Soviet Union	23.03	
7	Denise Boyd	Australia	23.05	
8	Chantal Réga	France	23.09	
