= Athletics at the 1972 Summer Olympics – Women's 4 × 100 metres relay =

Women's 4 × 100 metres relay at the Games of the XX Olympiad
- Venue: Olympic Stadium
- Dates: 9 September & 10 September 1972
- Competitors: 60 from 15 nations

Medalists
| 1st place, gold medalist(s) | | Christiane Krause, Ingrid Mickler-Becker, Annegret Richter, Heide Rosendahl | West Germany |
| 2nd place, silver medalist(s) | | Evelin Kaufer, Christina Heinich, Bärbel Struppert, Renate Stecher | East Germany |
| 3rd place, bronze medalist(s) | | Marlene Elejarde, Carmen Valdés, Fulgencia Romay, Silvia Chivás | Cuba |

These are the official results of the women's 4 × 100 metres relay event at the 1972 Summer Olympics in Munich, West Germany. The event was held on 9 and 10 September 1972. There were a total number of 15 nations competing.

== Records ==
These were the standing World and Olympic records (in seconds) prior to the 1972 Summer Olympics.

| World record | 42.88 | (United States) Margaret Bailes (United States) Barbara Ferrell (United States) Mildrette Netter (United States) Wyomia Tyus | Mexico City (MEX) | 20 October 1968 |
| Olympic record | 42.88 | (United States) Margaret Bailes (United States) Barbara Ferrell (United States) Mildrette Netter (United States) Wyomia Tyus | Mexico City (MEX) | 20 October 1968 |

== Results ==
=== Final ===
- Held on 10 September 1972

| RANK | NATION | ATHLETES | TIME |
|---|---|---|---|
| Gold medal | West Germany | • Christiane Krause • Ingrid Mickler-Becker • Annegret Richter • Heide Rosendahl | 42.81 (WR) |
| Silver medal | East Germany | • Evelin Kaufer • Christina Heinich • Bärbel Struppert • Renate Stecher | 42.95 |
| Bronze medal | Cuba | • Marlene Elejarde • Carmen Valdés • Fulgencia Romay • Silvia Chivás | 43.36 |
| 4. | United States | • Martha Watson • Mattline Render • Mildrette Netter • Iris Davis | 43.39 |
| 5. | Soviet Union | • Marina Sidorova • Galina Bukharina • Lyudmila Zharkova • Nadezhda Besfamilnaya | 43.59 |
| 6. | Australia | • Maureen Caird • Raelene Boyle • Marion Hoffman • Penny Gillies | 43.61 |
| 7. | Great Britain | • Andrea Lynch • Della Pascoe • Judy Vernon • Anita Neil | 43.71 |
| 8. | Poland | • Helena Kerner • Barbara Bakulin • Urszula Jóźwik • Danuta Jedrejek | 44.20 |

=== Semifinals ===
- Held on 9 September 1972

==== Heat 1 ====
| RANK | NATION | ATHLETES | TIME |
|---|---|---|---|
| 1. | Cuba | • Marlene Elejarde • Carmen Valdés • Fulgencia Romay • Silvia Chivás | 43.67 |
| 2. | Soviet Union | • Marina Sidorova • Galina Bukharina • Lyudmila Zharkova • Nedezhda Bezfamilnaia | 43.77 |
| 3. | Australia | • Maureen Caird • Pamela Ryan • Marion Hoffman • Raelene Boyle | 44.03 |
| 4. | Poland | • Helena Fliśnik • Barbara Bakulin • Urszula Jóźwik • Danuta Jędrejek | 44.19 |
| 5 | Italy | • Maddalena Grassano • Alessandra Orselli • Laura Nappi • Cecilia Molinari | 44.62 |
| 6. | Finland | • Tuula Rautanen • Mona-Lisa Strandvall • Pirjo Wilmi • Marika Eklund | 44.68 |
| 7. | Nigeria | • Emilie Edet • Ashanti Obi • Helen Olaye • Modupe Oshikoya | 45.15 |
| — | Philippines | • Lucila Salao • Carmen Torres • Aida Mantawel • Amelita Alanes | DSQ |

==== Heat 2 ====
| RANK | NATION | ATHLETES | TIME |
|---|---|---|---|
| 1. | East Germany | • Evelin Kaufer • Christina Heinich • Bärbel Struppert • Renate Stecher | 42.88 |
| 2. | West Germany | • Christiane Krause • Ingrid Mickler-Becker • Annegret Richter • Heide Rosendahl | 42.97 |
| 3. | United States | • Martha Watson • Mattline Render • Mildrette Netter • Iris Davis | 43.07 |
| 4. | Great Britain | • Andrea Lynch • Della Pascoe • Judy Vernon • Anita Neil | 43.76 |
| 5. | Bulgaria | • Diana Yorgova • Ivanka Valkova • Ivanka Venkova • Yordanka Yankova | 43.95 |
| — | Jamaica | • Lelieth Hodges • Vilma Charlton • Carol Cummings • Debbie Byfield | DSQ |
| — | Sweden | • Anneli Olsson • Gunhild Olsson • Karin Lundgren • Linda Haglund | DSQ |
