= Athletics at the 1973 Summer Universiade – Women's 100 metres =

The women's 100 metres event at the 1973 Summer Universiade was held at the Central Lenin Stadium in Moscow on 16 and 17 August.

== Medalists ==
Gold	Silver	Bronze
Mona-Lisa Pursiainen; Finland	Elfgard Schittenhelm; West Germany	Ellen Stropahl; East Germany

== Results ==
=== Heats ===
Held on 16 August

Wind:
Heat 1: +1.0 m/s, Heat 2: 0.0 m/s, Heat 3: +1.2 m/s, Heat 4: ? m/s, Heat 5: -1.3 m/s

Rank	Heat	Athlete	Nationality	Time	Notes
1	1	Mona-Lisa Pursiainen	Finland	11.29	Q, UR
2	1	Nadezhda Besfamilnaya	Soviet Union	11.52	Q
3	1	Denise Robertson	Australia	11.73	q
4	1	Christine Kepplinger	Austria	12.5	
5	1	Louise Wanyeki	Kenya	13.8	
6	1	Fatoumata Korouma	Guinea	14.8	
1	2	Lyudmila Maslakova	Soviet Union	11.65	Q
2	2	Christiane Krause	West Germany	11.88	Q
3	2	Catherine Delachanal	France	12.09	
4	2	Paola Bolognesi	Italy	12.3	
5	2	Diva Bishop	Panama	12.5	
1	3	Silvia Chivás	Cuba	11.57	Q
2	3	Cecilia Molinari	Italy	11.68	Q
3	3	Kathy Lawson	United States	11.75	q
4	3	Ewa Długołęcka	Poland	11.95	q
5	3	Brigitte Mariot	France	12.28	
1	4	Doris Maletzki	East Germany	11.78	Q
2	4	Carmen Valdés	Cuba	11.86	Q
3	4	Patty Loverock	Canada	11.86	q
4	4	Mattiline Render	United States	11.94	q
5	4	Urszula Styranka	Poland	11.96	
1	5	Elfgard Schittenhelm	West Germany	11.54	Q
2	5	Ellen Stropahl	East Germany	11.60	Q
3	5	Yordanka Yankova	Bulgaria	11.75	q
4	5	Linda Barratt	Great Britain	12.8	

=== Semifinals ===
Held on 17 August

Wind:
Heat 1: 0.0 m/s, Heat 2: 0.0 m/s

Rank	Heat	Athlete	Nationality	Time	Notes
1	1	Elfgard Schittenhelm	West Germany	11.52	Q
2	1	Nadezhda Besfamilnaya	Soviet Union	11.59	Q
3	1	Denise Robertson	Australia	11.64	Q
4	1	Doris Maletzki	East Germany	11.71	
5	1	Cecilia Molinari	Italy	11.72	
6	1	Carmen Valdés	Cuba	11.7	
7	1	Mattiline Render	United States	11.9	
	1	Yordanka Yankova	Bulgaria	?	
1	2	Mona-Lisa Pursiainen	Finland	11.34	Q
2	2	Silvia Chivás	Cuba	11.63	Q
3	2	Lyudmila Maslakova	Soviet Union	11.68	Q
4	2	Ellen Stropahl	East Germany	11.69	q
5	2	Patty Loverock	Canada	11.7	q
6	2	Kathy Lawson	United States	11.90	
7	2	Christiane Krause	West Germany	11.9	
8	2	Ewa Długołęcka	Poland	12.1	

=== Final ===
Held on 17 August

Wind: -0.6 m/s

Rank	Athlete	Nationality	Time	Notes
1st place, gold medalist(s)	Mona-Lisa Pursiainen	Finland	11.41	
2nd place, silver medalist(s)	Elfgard Schittenhelm	West Germany	11.62	
3rd place, bronze medalist(s)	Ellen Stropahl	East Germany	11.63	
4	Silvia Chivás	Cuba	11.66	
5	Lyudmila Maslakova	Soviet Union	11.73	
6	Nadezhda Besfamilnaya	Soviet Union	11.73	
7	Denise Robertson	Australia	11.77	
8	Patty Loverock	Canada	11.82	
