= Athletics at the 1975 Pan American Games – Women's 4 × 100 metres relay =

Women's 4 × 100 metres relay at the Pan American Games

The women's 4 × 100 metres relay event at the 1975 Pan American Games was held in Mexico City on 20 October.

== Results ==
Rank	Nation	Athletes	Time	Notes
1st place, gold medalist(s)	United States	Martha Watson, Brenda Morehead, Chandra Cheeseborough, Pamela Jiles	42.90	GR
2nd place, silver medalist(s)	Cuba	Marlene Elejarde, Silvia Chivás, Carmen Valdés, Fulgencia Romay	43.65	
3rd place, bronze medalist(s)	Canada	Marjorie Bailey, Patty Loverock, Joanne McTaggart, Joyce Yakubowich	43.68	
4	Jamaica	Lelieth Hodges, Carmetta Drummond, Carol Cummings, Jackie Pusey	43.95	
5	Argentina	Belkis Fava, Angela Godoy, Liliana Cragno, Beatriz Allocco	44.90	NR
6	Brazil	Maria Amorim, Maria Luísa Betioli, Silvina Pereira da Silva, Conceição Geremias	45.21	
7	Trinidad and Tobago	Ann Adams, Esther Hope, Angela McLean, Janice Bernard	45.56	
8	Bermuda	Andrea Trott, Branwen Smith, Donna Burgess, Debbie Jones	46.00	
