= Athletics at the 1975 Pan American Games – Women's 100 metres =

Women's 100 metres at the Pan American Games

The women's 100 metres event at the 1975 Pan American Games was held in Mexico City on 13 and 14 October.

== Medalists ==
Gold	Silver	Bronze
Pam Jiles; United States	Patty Loverock; Canada	Marjorie Bailey; Canada

== Results ==
=== Heats ===
Wind:
Heat 1: 0.0 m/s, Heat 2: +1.2 m/s, Heat 3: +1.6 m/s, Heat 4: -0.5 m/s

Rank	Heat	Name	Nationality	Time	Notes
1	2	Pam Jiles	United States	11.43	Q
2	4	Patty Loverock	Canada	11.49	Q
3	2	Marjorie Bailey	Canada	11.55	Q
4	1	Silvia Chivás	Cuba	11.58	Q
5	1	Renaye Bowen	United States	11.62	Q
5	2	Carol Cummings	Jamaica	11.62	Q
7	3	Lelieth Hodges	Jamaica	11.64	Q
8	2	Freida Davy	Barbados	11.67	Q
9	4	Carmen Valdés	Cuba	11.79	Q
10	4	Lorna Forde	Barbados	11.82	Q
11	2	Debbie Jones	Bermuda	11.86	
12	1	Carmela Bolívar	Peru	11.98	Q
12	3	Beatriz Allocco	Argentina	11.98	Q
14	3	Esther Hope	Trinidad and Tobago	12.14	Q
15	1	Maria Amorim	Brazil	12.20	Q
16	4	Liliana Cragno	Argentina	12.21	Q
17	4	Marie Lande Mathieu	Puerto Rico	12.22	
18	2	Guadalupe García	Mexico	12.32	
19	1	Georgina Koorndijk	Suriname	12.33	
20	4	Andrea Trott	Bermuda	12.36	
21	2	Madeline Reyes	Dominican Republic	12.86	

=== Semifinals ===
Wind:
Heat 1: +1.0 m/s, Heat 2: 0.0 m/s

Rank	Heat	Name	Nationality	Time	Notes
1	2	Patty Loverock	Canada	11.36	Q
2	2	Silvia Chivás	Cuba	11.36	Q
4	1	Marjorie Bailey	Canada	11.45	Q
5	2	Renaye Bowen	United States	11.50	Q
6	1	Pam Jiles	United States	11.52	Q
7	1	Carol Cummings	Jamaica	11.59	Q
8	2	Lelieth Hodges	Jamaica	11.61	Q
9	1	Carmen Valdés	Cuba	11.67	Q
10	1	Freida Davy	Barbados	11.85	
11	2	Lorna Forde	Barbados	11.75	
12	2	Beatriz Allocco	Argentina	11.88	
13	2	Carmela Bolívar	Peru	11.94	
14	1	Liliana Cragno	Argentina	12.10	
15	2	Maria Amorim	Brazil	12.22	
16	1	Esther Hope	Trinidad and Tobago	12.32	

=== Final ===
Wind: -1.6 m/s

Rank	Name	Nationality	Time	Notes
1st place, gold medalist(s)	Pam Jiles	United States	11.38	
2nd place, silver medalist(s)	Patty Loverock	Canada	11.41	
3rd place, bronze medalist(s)	Marjorie Bailey	Canada	11.42	
4	Silvia Chivás	Cuba	11.45	
5	Renaye Bowen	United States	11.50	
6	Carol Cummings	Jamaica	11.66	
7	Lelieth Hodges	Jamaica	11.74	
8	Carmen Valdés	Cuba	11.74	
