= Carmen Valdés =

Cuban sprinter (born 1954)

Personal information
- Full name: Carmen Laura Valdés Capote
- Born: November 23, 1954 (age 71) San José de las Lajas, Mayabeque, Cuba
- Height: 1.67 m (5 ft 6 in)
- Weight: 54 kg (119 lb)
Medal record
Women's Athletics
Representing Cuba
Olympic Games
Bronze medal – third place	1972 Munich	4x100 m relay
Pan American Games
Silver medal – second place	1971 Cali	4x100 m relay
Silver medal – second place	1975 Mexico City	4x100 m relay
Central American and Caribbean Games
Gold medal – first place	1974 Santo Domingo	100 metres
Gold medal – first place	1974 Santo Domingo	200 metres
Gold medal – first place	1978 Medellin	4x100 m relay

Carmen Laura Valdés Capote (born November 23, 1954) is a Cuban former sprinter who won an Olympic bronze medal in the 4 × 100-meter relay at the 1972 Summer Olympics in Munich alongside teammates Marlene Elejarde, Fulgencia Romay, and Silvia Chivás. On the continental stage, Valdés secured a silver medal in the same event at the 1971 Pan American Games in Cali. In addition to her relay success, she competed in the 100-meter semifinals at the 1972 Olympics, where she finished sixth in her heat.

== Early life and career ==
She was born on 23 November 1954 in San José de las Lajas, Mayabeque.

In 1971, she won a silver medal in the 4 × 100 meters relay at the 1971 Pan American Games in 45.0 seconds with Silvia Chivás, Fulgencia Romay, and Marlene Elejarde, losing to the team from the United States of America in 44.5 seconds, consisting of Orien Brown, Pat Hawkins, Mattiline Render, and Iris Davis, followed by Colombia in 45.9 seconds, consisting of Aida Ortíz, Ana Maquilón, Elsy Rivas, and Juana Mosquera.

Then, she competed in the 1972 Summer Olympics and won bronze medal in the same sport with the same team that competed the 1971 Pan American Gamesfinishing in 43.360 seconds and their team loses to Federal Republic of Germany that consist of Ingrid Becker, Annegret Richter Heide Rosendahl and Christiane Krause that won gold in 42.810 seconds followed after German Democratic Republic in 42.950 seconds consist of Christina Heinich, Bärbel Struppert Renate Stecher and Evelin Kaufer. At the event, she also competed in the 100 meters sprint but only placed in position 6, heat 1, semifinals

== Award ==
She was inducted in hall of fame of Central American and Caribbean Athletics.

== International competitions ==
Year	Competition	Venue	Position	Event	Notes
Representing Cuba
1971	Central American and Caribbean Championships	Kingston, Jamaica	1st	4 × 100 m relay	45.4
1971	Pan American Games	Cali, Colombia	2nd	4 × 100 m relay	45.01
1972	Olympic Games	Munich, West Germany	11th (sf)	100 m	11.52
1972	Olympic Games	Munich, West Germany	3rd	4 × 100 m relay	43.36
1973	Central American and Caribbean Championships	Maracaibo, Venezuela	2nd	100 m	11.6
1973	Central American and Caribbean Championships	Maracaibo, Venezuela	1st	4 × 100 m relay	45.9
1973	Universiade	Moscow, Soviet Union	8th (sf)	100 m	11.7
1973	Universiade	Moscow, Soviet Union	15th (sf)	200 m	24.3
1974	Central American and Caribbean Games	Santo Domingo, Dominican Republic	1st	100 m	11.55
1974	Central American and Caribbean Games	Santo Domingo, Dominican Republic	1st	200 m	23.76
1974	Central American and Caribbean Games	Santo Domingo, Dominican Republic	1st	4 × 100 m relay	44.90
1975	Pan American Games	Mexico City, Mexico	8th	100 m	11.74
1975	Pan American Games	Mexico City, Mexico	2nd	4 × 100 m relay	43.65
1976	Olympic Games	Montreal, Canada	19th (qf)	100 m	11.52
1976	Olympic Games	Montreal, Canada	10th (h)	4 × 100 m relay	44.29
1978	Central American and Caribbean Games	Medellín, Colombia	1st	4 × 100 m relay	44.37

== Personal bests ==
- 100 metres – 11.1 (1976)
