= Athletics at the 1975 Pan American Games – Women's 200 metres =

Women's 200 metres at the Pan American Games

The women's 200 metres event at the 1975 Pan American Games was held in Mexico City on 14 and 15 October.

== Medalists ==
Gold	Silver	Bronze
Chandra Cheeseborough; United States	Pam Jiles; United States	Silvina Pereira da Silva; Brazil

== Results ==
=== Heats ===
Wind:
Heat 1: -0.1 m/s, Heat 2: +2.1 m/s, Heat 3: -2.5 m/s, Heat 4: 0.0 m/s

Rank	Heat	Name	Nationality	Time	Notes
1	1	Chandra Cheeseborough	United States	23.07	Q
2	4	Silvina Pereira da Silva	Brazil	23.21	Q
3	2	Silvia Chivás	Cuba	23.31	Q
4	2	Carol Cummings	Jamaica	23.43	Q
5	4	Debbie Jones	Bermuda	23.46	Q
6	2	Marjorie Bailey	Canada	23.56	Q
7	3	Pam Jiles	United States	23.63	Q
8	3	Beatriz Allocco	Argentina	23.71	Q
9	1	Lorna Forde	Barbados	23.72	Q
10	2	Freida Davy	Barbados	23.76	Q
11	3	Joyce Yakubowich	Canada	23.83	Q
12	4	Angela Godoy	Argentina	24.12	Q
13	4	Asunción Acosta	Cuba	24.22	Q
14	1	Andrea Trott	Bermuda	24.52	Q
15	1	Carmela Bolívar	Peru	24.56	Q
16	2	Maria Amorim	Brazil	24.59	
17	1	Marie Mathieu	Puerto Rico	24.65	
18	1	Margarita Grun	Uruguay	24.72	
19	2	Georgine Koorndijk	Suriname	24.78	
20	4	Janice Bernard	Trinidad and Tobago	24.80	
21	3	Zonia Meigham	Guatemala	25.12	Q
22	3	Angela McLean	Trinidad and Tobago	25.22	
23	2	Shonel Ferguson	Bahamas	25.28	
24	3	Guadalupe García	Mexico	25.45	
25	4	Olga González	Guatemala	27.61	
26	4	Rose Gauthier	Haiti	27.96	

=== Semifinals ===
Wind:
Heat 1: 0.0 m/s, Heat 2: -1.2 m/s

Rank	Heat	Name	Nationality	Time	Notes
1	1	Pam Jiles	United States	23.03	Q
2	2	Chandra Cheeseborough	United States	23.14	Q
3	2	Silvina Pereira da Silva	Brazil	23.20	Q
4	1	Silvia Chivás	Cuba	23.22	Q
5	1	Carol Cummings	Jamaica	23.33	Q
6	2	Joyce Yakubowich	Canada	23.43	Q
7	2	Lorna Forde	Barbados	23.64	Q
8	2	Debbie Jones	Bermuda	23.86	
9	1	Marjorie Bailey	Canada	23.92	Q
10	1	Freida Davy	Barbados	24.21	
11	1	Beatriz Allocco	Argentina	24.31	
12	1	Carmela Bolívar	Peru	24.85	
13	2	Zonia Meigham	Guatemala	25.44	
	1	Angela Godoy	Argentina	DNS	
	2	Andrea Trott	Bermuda	DNS	
	2	Asunción Acosta	Cuba	DNS	

=== Final ===
Wind: 0.0 m/s

Rank	Name	Nationality	Time	Notes
1st place, gold medalist(s)	Chandra Cheeseborough	United States	22.77	
2nd place, silver medalist(s)	Pam Jiles	United States	22.81	
3rd place, bronze medalist(s)	Silvina Pereira da Silva	Brazil	23.17	AR
4	Marjorie Bailey	Canada	23.32	
5	Silvia Chivás	Cuba	23.33	
6	Joyce Yakubowich	Canada	23.34	
7	Lorna Forde	Barbados	23.34	
8	Carol Cummings	Jamaica	23.42	
