= Athletics at the 1973 Summer Universiade – Women's 200 metres =

The women's 200 metres event at the 1973 Summer Universiade was held at the Central Lenin Stadium in Moscow on 18, 19 and 20 August.

== Medalists ==
Gold	Silver	Bronze
Mona-Lisa Pursiainen; Finland	Marina Sidorova; Soviet Union	Ellen Stropahl; East Germany

== Results ==
=== Heats ===
Wind:
Heat 1: +1.9 m/s, Heat 4: +0.8 m/s

Rank	Heat	Athlete	Nationality	Time	Notes
1	1	Ellen Stropahl	East Germany	24.0	Q
2	1	Carmen Valdés	Cuba	24.2	Q
3	1	Catherine Delachanal	France	24.7	
4	1	Emma Negassa	Uganda	29.8	
1	2	Mona-Lisa Pursiainen	Finland	23.4	Q
2	2	Silvia Chivás	Cuba	23.9	Q
3	2	Cecilia Molinari	Italy	23.97	q
4	2	Pam Greene	United States	24.14	
5	2	Dawn Webster	Great Britain	24.6	
1	3	Nadezhda Besfamilnaya	Soviet Union	24.0	Q
2	3	Joyce Sadowick	Canada	24.2	Q
3	3	Urszula Styranka	Poland	24.2	q
4	3	Annegret Richter	West Germany	24.6	q
1	4	Denise Robertson	Australia	23.5	Q
2	4	Barbara Bakulin	Poland	23.6	Q
3	4	Patty Loverock	Canada	24.0	q
4	4	Laura Nappi	Italy	24.3	
5	4	Brigitte Mariot	France	25.0	
1	5	Marina Sidorova	Soviet Union	23.5	Q
2	5	Doris Maletzki	East Germany	23.7	Q
3	5	Sigrid Goydke	West Germany	24.2	q
4	5	Rochelle Davis	United States	24.63	
5	5	Linda Barratt	Great Britain	24.8	
6	5	Diva Bishop	Panama	25.7	
7	5	Viviane Nouailhetas-Simon	Brazil	27.0	

=== Semifinals ===
Wind:
Heat 1: 0.0 m/s, Heat 2: ? m/s

Rank	Heat	Athlete	Nationality	Time	Notes
1	1	Marina Sidorova	Soviet Union	23.01	Q
2	1	Ellen Stropahl	East Germany	23.13	Q
3	1	Denise Robertson	Australia	23.53	Q
4	1	Urszula Styranka	Poland	23.7	q
5	1	Joyce Sadowick	Canada	24.02	
6	1	Pam Greene	United States	24.1	
7	1	Cecilia Molinari	Italy	24.1	
8	1	Silvia Chivás	Cuba	24.1	
1	2	Mona-Lisa Pursiainen	Finland	23.05	Q
2	2	Doris Maletzki	East Germany	23.39	Q
3	2	Nadezhda Besfamilnaya	Soviet Union	23.66	Q
4	2	Barbara Bakulin	Poland	23.8	q
5	2	Patty Loverock	Canada	24.1	
6	2	Sigrid Goydke	West Germany	24.20	
7	2	Carmen Valdés	Cuba	24.3	
8	2	Laura Nappi	Italy	24.5	

=== Final ===
Wind: +0.6 m/s

Rank	Athlete	Nationality	Time	Notes
1st place, gold medalist(s)	Mona-Lisa Pursiainen	Finland	22.39	
2nd place, silver medalist(s)	Marina Sidorova	Soviet Union	22.72	NR
3rd place, bronze medalist(s)	Ellen Stropahl	East Germany	22.73	
4	Doris Maletzki	East Germany	23.04	
5	Denise Robertson	Australia	23.16	
6	Barbara Bakulin	Poland	23.21	
7	Nadezhda Besfamilnaya	Soviet Union	23.38	
8	Urszula Styranka	Poland	23.52	
