= Athletics at the 1976 Summer Olympics – Women's 100 metres =

Women's 100 metres at the Games of the XXI Olympiad
- Venue: Olympic Stadium
- Date: 24–25 July 1976
- Competitors: 39 from 21 nations
- Winning time: 11.08

Medalists
1st place, gold medalist(s)		Annegret Richter; West Germany
2nd place, silver medalist(s)		Renate Stecher; East Germany
3rd place, bronze medalist(s)		Inge Helten; West Germany

The women's 100 metres competition at the 1976 Summer Olympics in Montreal, Quebec, Canada was held at the Olympic Stadium on 24–25 July.

== Competition format ==
The women's 100m competition consisted of heats (Round 1), Quarterfinals, Semifinals and a Final. The five fastest competitors from each race in the heats plus the next two fastest overall qualified for the Quarterfinals. The four fastest competitors from each of the Quarterfinal races qualified for the Semifinals, where again the four fastest runners from each heat advanced to the final.

== Records ==
Prior to the competition, the existing World and Olympic records were as follows.

World record	Inge Helten (FRG)	11.04	Fürth, West Germany	June 13, 1976
Olympic record	Renate Stecher (GDR)	11.07	Munich, East Germany	2 September 1972

== Results ==
=== Heats ===
Qual. rule: first 5 of each heat (Q) plus the two fastest times (q) qualified.

==== Heat 1 ====
Rank	Athlete	Nation	Time	Notes
1	Inge Helten	West Germany	11.26	Q
2	Lyudmila Zharkova-Maslakova	Soviet Union	11.30	Q
3	Rosie Allwood	Jamaica	11.35	Q
4	Marjorie Bailey	Canada	11.46	Q
5	Sharon Colyear-Danville	Great Britain	11.47	Q
6	Carol Cummings	Jamaica	11.69	q
7	Lorna Forde	Barbados	12.02	

==== Heat 2 ====
Rank	Athlete	Nation	Time	Notes
1	Brenda Morehead	United States	11.35	Q
2	Patty Loverock	Canada	11.47	Q
3	Lelieth Hodges	Jamaica	11.54	Q
4	Esmeralda de Jesus Garcia	Brazil	11.80	Q
5	Debbie Jones	Bermuda	11.84	Q
6	Rita Hendricks	Virgin Islands	13.51	
—	Sonia Lannaman	Great Britain	DNS	

==== Heat 3 ====
Rank	Athlete	Nation	Time	Notes
1	Raelene Boyle	Australia	11.39	Q
2	Linda Haglund	Sweden	11.40	Q
3	Sue Jowett	New Zealand	11.70	Q
4	Isabel Taylor	Cuba	11.73	Q
5	Margaret Howe	Canada	11.83	Q
6	Shonel Ferguson	Bahamas	12.26	

==== Heat 4 ====
Rank	Athlete	Nation	Time	Notes
1	Chandra Cheeseborough	United States	11.28	Q
2	Vera Anisimova	Soviet Union	11.37	Q
3	Silvia Chivás	Cuba	11.43	Q
4	Elvira Possekel	West Germany	11.48	Q
5	Denise Robertson	Australia	11.50	Q
6	Martina Blos	East Germany	11.70	
7	Carolina Rieuwpassa	Indonesia	11.98	

==== Heat 5 ====
Rank	Athlete	Nation	Time	Notes
1	Marlies Oelsner	East Germany	11.36	Q
2	Andrea Lynch	Great Britain	11.40	Q
3	Sylviane Telliez	France	11.47	Q
4	Nadezhda Besfamilnaya	Soviet Union	11.52	Q
5	Lea Alaerts	Belgium	11.63	Q
6	Divina Estrella	Dominican Republic	12.12	

==== Heat 6 ====
Rank	Athlete	Nation	Time	Notes
1	Annegret Richter	West Germany	11.19	Q
2	Renate Stecher	East Germany	11.21	Q
3	Evelyn Ashford	United States	11.25	Q
4	Debbie Wells	Australia	11.47	Q
5	Carmen Valdés	Cuba	11.47	Q
6	Mona-Lisa Pursiainen	Finland	11.62	q
7	Antoinette Gauthier	Haiti	13.11	

=== Quarterfinals ===
==== Quarterfinal 1 ====
Rank	Athlete	Nation	Time	Notes
1	Annegret Richter	West Germany	11.05	Q, OR
2	Marlies Oelsner	East Germany	11.27	Q
3	Rosie Allwood	Jamaica	11.34	Q
4	Patty Loverock	Canada	11.50	Q
5	Nadezhda Besfamilnaya	Soviet Union	11.63	
6	Sylviane Telliez	France	11.64	
7	Esmeralda de Jesus Garcia	Brazil	11.77	
—	Debbie Jones	Bermuda	DNS	

==== Quarterfinal 2 ====
Rank	Athlete	Nation	Time	Notes
1	Inge Helten	West Germany	11.20	Q
2	Chandra Cheeseborough	United States	11.36	Q
3	Andrea Lynch	Great Britain	11.36	Q
4	Linda Haglund	Sweden	11.48	Q
5	Carmen Valdés	Cuba	11.52	
6	Denise Robertson-Boyd	Australia	11.56	
7	Carol Cummings	Jamaica	11.75	
8	Sue Jowett	New Zealand	11.81	

==== Quarterfinal 3 ====
Rank	Athlete	Nation	Time	Notes
1	Evelyn Ashford	United States	11.28	Q
2	Raelene Boyle	Australia	11.29	Q
3	Lyudmila Zharkova-Maslakova	Soviet Union	11.37	Q
4	Silvia Chivás	Cuba	11.42	Q
5	Sharon Colyear-Danville	Great Britain	11.51	
6	Elvira Possekel	West Germany	11.58	
7	Lea Alaerts	Belgium	11.71	
8	Margaret Howe	Canada	11.96	

==== Quarterfinal 4 ====
Rank	Athlete	Nation	Time	Notes
1	Renate Stecher	East Germany	11.22	Q
2	Brenda Morehead	United States	11.30	Q
3	Marjorie Bailey	Canada	11.44	Q
4	Vera Anisimova	Soviet Union	11.47	Q
5	Debbie Wells	Australia	11.51	
6	Lelieth Hodges	Jamaica	11.58	
7	Mona-Lisa Pursiainen	Finland	11.72	
8	Isabel Taylor	Cuba	11.92	

=== Semifinals ===
==== Semifinal 1 ====
Rank	Athlete	Nation	Time	Notes
1	Annegret Richter	West Germany	11.01	Q, WR
2	Evelyn Ashford	United States	11.21	Q
3	Chandra Cheeseborough	United States	11.26	Q
4	Marlies Oelsner	East Germany	11.29	Q
5	Rosie Allwood	Jamaica	11.32	
6	Vera Anisimova	Soviet Union	11.39	
7	Silvia Chivás	Cuba	11.43	
8	Marjorie Bailey	Canada	11.47	

==== Semifinal 2 ====
Rank	Athlete	Nation	Time	Notes
1	Renate Stecher	East Germany	11.10	Q
2	Inge Helten	West Germany	11.18	Q
3	Raelene Boyle	Australia	11.22	Q
4	Andrea Lynch	Great Britain	11.28	Q
5	Lyudmila Zharkova-Maslakova	Soviet Union	11.34	
6	Brenda Morehead	United States	11.38	
7	Patty Loverock	Canada	11.40	
8	Linda Haglund	Sweden	11.41	

=== Final ===
Rank	Athlete	Nation	Time
1st place, gold medalist(s)	Annegret Richter	West Germany	11.08
2nd place, silver medalist(s)	Renate Stecher	East Germany	11.13
3rd place, bronze medalist(s)	Inge Helten	West Germany	11.17
4	Raelene Boyle	Australia	11.23
5	Evelyn Ashford	United States	11.24
6	Chandra Cheeseborough	United States	11.31
7	Andrea Lynch	Great Britain	11.32
8	Marlies Oelsner	East Germany	11.34
