= Shooting at the 2023 Pan American Games – Qualification =

The following is the qualification system and qualified countries for the Shooting at the 2023 Pan American Games competitions.

== Qualification system ==
A total of 244 sport shooters will qualify to compete. Each nation may enter a maximum of 24 athletes (two per each individual event). Therefore, a nation can enter 12 (6 per gender) in each discipline (rifle, pistol and shotgun). There will be three qualification events for shooters to qualify. There will be no quotas awarded for the mixed events, as nations must use already qualified athletes to compete in them. As host nation, Chile will get a quota of six athletes (two per each discipline, and can qualify more) and there will also be two wild cards awarded to nations not qualified.

All quotas will be awarded in sequential order of the event in question and an athlete may only win one quota for a country. A nation may substitute quotas from one event to another as along its within the same discipline (rifle, pistol and shotgun). This means the qualification of quotas will not necessarily reflect the final entry lists.

== Qualification timeline ==
| Event | Date | Venue |
|---|---|---|
| 2021 Junior Pan American Games | November 26–28 | (Colombia) Cali |
| 2022 South American Games | October 9–14 | (Paraguay) Asunción |
| 2022 Americas Shooting Championships | November 4–13 | (Peru) Lima |
| 2023 Central American and Caribbean Games | July 23– August 8 | (El Salvador) San Salvador |

== Quota allocation ==
There will be 70 quotas available in each rifle and pistol along with 92 in shotgun events. Chile's 6 host quota spots will be awarded two per discipline. They are split as follows:

| Event | JPA | SA | CAC | PAC | Athletes |
|---|---|---|---|---|---|
| 10 m air rifle men | 1 | 2 | 2 | 15 | 20 |
| 50 m rifle three positions men | —N/a | 1 | 1 | 14 | 16 |
| 10 m air pistol men | 1 | 2 | 2 | 15 | 20 |
| 25 m rapid fire pistol men | —N/a | 1 | 1 | 14 | 16 |
| Trap men | —N/a | 1 | 1 | 28 | 30 |
| Skeet men | —N/a | 1 | 1 | ~~28~~ 26 | 28 |
| 10 m air rifle women | 1 | 2 | 2 | 15 | 20 |
| 50 m rifle three positions women | —N/a | 1 | 1 | 14 | 16 |
| 10 m air pistol women | 1 | 2 | 2 | 15 | 20 |
| 25 m pistol women | —N/a | 1 | 1 | 14 | 16 |
| Trap women | —N/a | 1 | 1 | 14 | 16 |
| Skeet women | —N/a | 2 | ~~2~~ 0 | ~~12~~ 11 | 13 |
| Host nation (Chile) | —N/a | | | | 6 |
| Wild card | —N/a | | | | 2 |
| Reallocation | —N/a | | | | 5 |
| TOTAL | 4 | 17 | 17 | 198 | 244 |

== Qualification summary by event ==
A total of 22 countries qualified sport shooters so far.

| Nation | Men | | | | | | Women | | | | | | Mixed pairs | | | Total |
| Nation | AP | RFP | AR | R3P | Trap | Skeet | AP | P | AR | R3P | Trap | Skeet | AP | AR | Skeet | Athletes |
|---|---|---|---|---|---|---|---|---|---|---|---|---|---|---|---|---|
| Argentina | 1 | 1 | 2 | 1 | 2 | 2 | | 1 | 2 | 2 | | | | X | | 14 |
| Aruba | 1 | | | | | | | | | | | | | | | 1 |
| Barbados | | | | | 2 | 1 | | | | | | 1 | | | X | 4 |
| Bolivia | 1 | | | | 1 | | | | 1 | | | | | | | 3 |
| Brazil | 2 | 2 | | 2 | 2 | 2 | | 2 | | 2 | 2 | 1 | | | X | 17 |
| Canada | 1 | | 1 | 1 | 2 | 2 | 2 | 2 | | 1 | 2 | 2 | X | | X | 16 |
| Chile | | 1 | 1 | 2 | 2 | 2 | 1 | 1 | 2 | 1 | 1 | 2 | X | X | X | 16 |
| Colombia | 2 | 2 | | 1 | 2 | 2 | 1 | 1 | 1 | | | | | | | 12 |
| Cuba | 2 | 2 | 1 | 2 | | 1 | 2 | 1 | 2 | 1 | | | X | X | | 14 |
| Dominican Republic | | | | | 2 | 2 | | | | | 1 | | | | | 5 |
| Ecuador | 1 | | 1 | 1 | | 2 | 1 | 1 | | 1 | | | X | | | 8 |
| El Salvador | | 2 | 2 | | | | 1 | | 1 | 1 | | | | | | 7 |
| Guatemala | 2 | | 2 | 2 | 2 | 2 | 2 | 1 | 2 | 1 | 2 | 1 | X | X | X | 19 |
| Mexico | 3 | 1 | 2 | 2 | 2 | 2 | 2 | 2 | 2 | 1 | 2 | 2 | X | X | X | 23 |
| Nicaragua | | | | | | | | | 1 | | | | | | | 1 |
| Panama | | | | | 2 | 2 | | | | | 1 | | | | | 5 |
| Paraguay | | | | | | | | | | | 1 | | | | | 1 |
| Peru | 2 | 1 | 2 | | 2 | 2 | 1 | 2 | 2 | 1 | 1 | 1 | X | X | X | 17 |
| Puerto Rico | | 1 | 2 | | 2 | 2 | 2 | | 1 | | 2 | 1 | | | X | 13 |
| United States | 2 | 2 | 3 | 2 | 2 | 2 | 3 | 2 | 3 | 2 | 2 | 2 | X | X | X | 27 |
| Uruguay | | | | | 1 | | | | | | | | | | | 1 |
| Venezuela | | 1 | 1 | | 2 | | 2 | | | 1 | | | | | | 7 |
| Total: 22 NOCs | 18 | 15 | 18 | 15 | 29 | 27 | 18 | 15 | 18 | 15 | 15 | 13 | | | | 216 |

- No quotas for the mixed doubles events of Rifle, Pistol and Skeet will be granted; athletes who have qualified for individual events must be used to enter the Mixed Doubles event.
- AR = Air rifle, R3P = Rifle three positions, AP = Air pistol, RFP = Rapid fire pistol, P = Pistol

== Qualification summary per discipline ==
| NOC | Pistol | Rifle | Shotgun | Total athletes |
|---|---|---|---|---|
| Argentina | 3 | 7 | 4 | 14 |
| Aruba | 1 | | | 1 |
| Barbados | | | 4 | 4 |
| Bolivia | 1 | 1 | 1 | 3 |
| Brazil | 6 | 4 | 7 | 17 |
| Canada | 5 | 3 | 8 | 16 |
| Chile | 3 | 6 | 7 | 16 |
| Colombia | 6 | 2 | 4 | 12 |
| Cuba | 7 | 6 | 1 | 14 |
| Dominican Republic | | | 5 | 5 |
| Ecuador | 3 | 3 | 2 | 8 |
| El Salvador | 3 | 4 | | 7 |
| Guatemala | 6 | 7 | 7 | 20 |
| Mexico | 7 | 8 | 8 | 23 |
| Nicaragua | | 1 | | 1 |
| Panama | | | 5 | 5 |
| Paraguay | | | 1 | 1 |
| Peru | 6 | 5 | 6 | 17 |
| Puerto Rico | 3 | 3 | 7 | 13 |
| Uruguay | | | 1 | 1 |
| United States | 9 | 10 | 8 | 27 |
| Venezuela | 3 | 2 | 2 | 7 |
| Total: 22 NOCs | 72 | 72 | 92 | 244 |

== Men ==
=== Pistol events ===
The quota allocation is as follows:

| Event | 10 m air pistol | 25 m rapid pistol |
|---|---|---|
| Junior Pan American Games | Ricardo Valencia (MEX) | —N/a |
| South American Games | Colombia; Brazil | Brazil |
| Pan American Championships | Brazil; United States; Cuba; Mexico; United States; Argentina; Ecuador; Cuba; Peru; Mexico; Colombia; Canada; Bolivia; Guatemala; Peru | Cuba; United States; Cuba; Colombia; Brazil; United States; Mexico; Colombia; Venezuela; Chile; Peru; Puerto Rico; Argentina; El Salvador |
| Central American and Caribbean Games | Aruba; Guatemala | El Salvador |
| Host | | |
| Wild card | | |
| TOTAL | 20 | 16 |

=== Rifle events ===
The quota allocation is as follows:

| Event | 10 m air rifle | 50 m rifle three positions |
|---|---|---|
| Junior Pan American Games | Rylan Kissel (USA) | —N/a |
| South American Games | Venezuela; Argentina | Brazil |
| Pan American Championships | United States; Argentina; Mexico; United States; Mexico; Ecuador; Guatemala; Cuba; Chile; Peru; Canada; Peru; Puerto Rico; Puerto Rico; El Salvador | United States; United States; Mexico; Canada; Brazil; Argentina; Colombia; Mexico; Cuba; Guatemala; Chile; Guatemala; Chile; Ecuador |
| Central American and Caribbean Games | El Salvador; Guatemala | Cuba |
| Host | | |
| Wild card | | |
| TOTAL | 20 | 16 |

=== Shotgun events ===
The quota allocation is as follows:

| Event | Trap | Skeet |
|---|---|---|
| South American Games | Peru | Peru |
| Pan American Championships | United States; Guatemala; United States; Guatemala; Venezuela; Peru; Mexico; Venezuela; Chile; Canada; Brazil; Dominican Republic; Bolivia; Dominican Republic; Uruguay; Barbados; Brazil; Argentina; Argentina; Puerto Rico; Puerto Rico; Chile; Canada; Colombia; Barbados; Panama; Colombia; Mexico | United States; Argentina; Chile; Chile; Argentina; United States; Canada; Puerto Rico; Mexico; Mexico; Peru; Canada; Guatemala; Dominican Republic; Dominican Republic; Cuba; Guatemala; Puerto Rico; Ecuador; Brazil; Barbados; Ecuador; Brazil; Colombia; Panama; Panama — — |
| Central American and Caribbean Games | Panama | Colombia |
| Host | | |
| Wild card | | |
| TOTAL | 30 | 28 |

- Two spots in skeet will be reallocated as there was not enough athletes to allocate the full quota of 28 at the Pan American Championships.

== Women ==
=== Pistol events ===
The quota allocation is as follows:

| Event | 10 m air pistol | 25 m pistol |
|---|---|---|
| Junior Pan American Games | Suman Sanghera (USA) | —N/a |
| South American Games | Peru; Ecuador | Ecuador |
| Pan American Championships | United States; Mexico; Cuba; Puerto Rico; United States; Canada; Mexico; Puerto Rico; Guatemala; Guatemala; Canada; Venezuela; Cuba; El Salvador; Chile | United States; Brazil; Mexico; Guatemala; Canada; Peru; United States; Brazil; Canada; Peru; Argentina; Chile; Colombia; Cuba |
| Central American and Caribbean Games | Colombia; Venezuela | Guatemala |
| Host | | |
| Wild card | | |
| TOTAL | 20 | 16 |

=== Rifle events ===
The quota allocation is as follows:

| Event | 10 m air rifle | 50 m rifle three positions |
|---|---|---|
| Junior Pan American Games | Mary Tucker (USA) | —N/a |
| South American Games | Argentina; Argentina | Brazil |
| Pan American Championships | United States; United States; Cuba; Cuba; Puerto Rico; Chile; Guatemala; Peru; Guatemala; Colombia; Mexico; Peru; Chile; Bolivia; El Salvador | United States; United States; Argentina; Canada; Peru; Argentina; Brazil; Guatemala; Chile; El Salvador; Mexico; Venezuela; Ecuador; Cuba |
| Central American and Caribbean Games | Mexico; Nicaragua | Mexico |
| Host | | |
| Wild card | | |
| TOTAL | 20 | 16 |

=== Shotgun events ===
The quota allocation is as follows:

| Event | Trap | Skeet |
|---|---|---|
| South American Games | Chile | Peru; Chile |
| Pan American Championships | United States; United States; Puerto Rico; Puerto Rico; Guatemala; Canada; Guatemala; Mexico; Brazil; Brazil; Canada; Mexico; Peru; Paraguay | United States; United States; Mexico; Brazil; Mexico; Canada; Puerto Rico; Chile; Barbados; Guatemala; Canada |
| Central American and Caribbean Games | Panama; Dominican Republic | — — |
| Host | | |
| Wild card | | |
| TOTAL | 16 | 15 |

- One spot in skeet will be reallocated as there was not enough athletes to allocate the full quota of 12 at the Pan American Championships.
- Two spots in skeet will be reallocated as there was not enough athletes to allocate the quota of two at the Central American and Caribbean Games
