= Squash at the 2023 Pan American Games – Women's singles =

Women's singles at the 2023 Pan American Games
- Venue: Racket Sports Center
- Dates: October 31 - November 1
- Competitors: 17 from 8 nations

Medalists
Gold medal	Olivia Weaver	United States
Silver medal	Amanda Sobhy	United States
Bronze medal	Marina Stefanoni	United States
Bronze medal	Hollie Naughton	Canada

The women's singles competition of the squash events at the 2023 Pan American Games was held from October 31 to November 1 at the Racquet Sports Center (Centro de Entrenamiento del Tenis y Deportes de Raqueta) in Santiago, Chile.

== Format ==
Each National Olympic Committee could enter a maximum of three athletes into the competition. The athletes were drawn into an elimination stage draw. Once an athlete lost a match, they will be no longer able to compete. Each match will be contested as the best of five games. Unlike other events, there is not bronze medal match, so the two athletes that do not win during the semifinals receive a bronze medal.

== Schedule ==
Date	Time	Round
October 31, 2023	09:00	Round of 32
October 31, 2023	10:00	Round of 16
October 31, 2023	20:15	Quarterfinals
November 1, 2023	11:00	Semifinals
November 1, 2023	18:00	Final

== Results ==
The results were as follows

Round of 32
María Buenaño (ECU)	14	5	6	8
Margot Prow (BAR)	12	11	11	11

Round of 16
Amanda Sobhy (USA)	11	11	11
Margot Prow (BAR)	2	3	3
Sarahi López (MEX)	12	6	7	11	15
Laura Tovar (COL)	10	11	11	8	13
Marina Stefanoni (USA)	11	11	11
Winifer Bonilla (EAI)	4	8	4
Giselle Delgado (CHI)	6	2	11
Nicole Bunyan (CAN)	11	11	13
Hollie Naughton (CAN)	11	11	11
Tabita Gaitán (EAI)	3	5	5
Meagan Best (BAR)	11	7	11	11
Lucía Bautista (COL)	6	11	9	6
Diana García (MEX)	11	7	7	11	7
María Moya (ECU)	6	11	11	11
Ana María Pinto (CHI)	1	7	1
Olivia Weaver (USA)	11	11	11

Quarterfinals
Amanda Sobhy (USA)	11	11	11
Sarahi López (MEX)	5	4	1
Marina Stefanoni (USA)	8	11	5	11	11
Nicole Bunyan (CAN)	11	8	11	9	8
Hollie Naughton (CAN)	11	11	9	7	11
Meagan Best (BAR)	8	8	11	11	3
María Moya (ECU)	3	2	1
Olivia Weaver (USA)	11	11	11

Semifinals
Amanda Sobhy (USA)	11	11	11
Marina Stefanoni (USA)	5	6	6
Hollie Naughton (CAN)	11	5	5	9
Olivia Weaver (USA)	8	11	11	11

Final
Amanda Sobhy (USA)	11	11	6	5	6
Olivia Weaver (USA)	4	6	11	11	11
