= Athletics at the 1972 Summer Olympics – Women's 100 metres =

Women's 100 metres at the Games of the XX Olympiad
- Venue: Olympic Stadium
- Dates: September 1 & 2, 1972
- Competitors: 47 from 33 nations
- Winning time: 11.07 WR

Medalists
1st place, gold medalist(s)		Renate Stecher; East Germany
2nd place, silver medalist(s)		Raelene Boyle; Australia
3rd place, bronze medalist(s)		Silvia Chivás; Cuba

The women's 100 metres sprint event at the 1972 Olympic Games took place on September 1 & 2.

== Results ==
=== Heats ===
Top five in each heat (blue) and the next two fastest (pink) advanced to quarterfinal round.

=== Heat 1 ===
Rank	Athlete	Nation	Lane	Time	Notes
1	Silvia Chivás	Cuba	3	11.18	WJR
2	Annegret Richter	West Germany	7	11.30	
3	Wilma van Gool	Netherlands	4	11.43	
4	Andrea Lynch	Great Britain	1	11.52	
5	Mattiline Render	United States	5	11.60	
6	Juana Mosquera	Colombia	8	11.64	
7	Marion Hoffman	Australia	6	11.68	
8	Missie Misomali	Malawi	2	12.78	

=== Heat 2 ===
Rank	Athlete	Nation	Lane	Time
1	Esther Shakhamorov	Israel	7	11.45
2	Ivanka Valkova	Bulgaria	1	11.49
3	Eva Glesková	Czechoslovakia	5	11.50
4	Evelin Kaufer	East Germany	8	11.59
5	Galina Bukharina	Soviet Union	3	11.69
6	Beatrice Lungu	Zambia	4	12.42
7	Fatima El-Faquir	Morocco	2	12.56
8	Russel Carrero	Nicaragua	6	13.45

=== Heat 3 ===
Rank	Athlete	Nation	Lane	Time
1	Iris Davis	United States	3	11.34
2	Alice Anum	Ghana	5	11.54
3	Anita Neil	Great Britain	8	11.55
4	Cecilia Molinari	Italy	1	11.61
5	Pam Kilborn	Australia	4	11.73
6	Linda Haglund	Sweden	2	11.97
7	Freida Nicholls-Davy	Barbados	7	12.16
8	Irene Fitzner	Argentina	6	12.51

=== Heat 4 ===
Rank	Athlete	Nation	Lane	Time
1	Renate Stecher	East Germany	5	11.31
2	Rosie Allwood	Jamaica	4	11.46
3	Barbara Ferrell	United States	3	11.47
4	Hannah Afriyie	Ghana	1	11.90
5	Laura Nappi	Italy	6	12.02
6	Carolina Rieuwpassa	Indonesia	7	12.23
7	Amelita Alanes	Philippines	2	12.37
8	Meas Kheng	Khmer Republic	8	12.72

=== Heat 5 ===
Rank	Athlete	Nation	Lane	Time
1	Raelene Boyle	Australia	7	11.37
2	Carmen Valdés	Cuba	1	11.53
3	Ingrid Becker	West Germany	3	11.55
4	Lyudmila Zharkova	Soviet Union	8	11.56
5	Ellen Strophal	East Germany	4	11.63
6	Tuula Rautanen	Finland	6	11.89
7	Emilie Edet	Nigeria	2	12.06
8	Mireille Joseph	Haiti	5	13.84

=== Heat 6 ===
Rank	Athlete	Nation	Lane	Time
1	Elfgard Schittenhelm	West Germany	1	11.32
2	Irena Szewińska	Poland	8	11.33
3	Sylviane Telliez	France	6	11.36
4	Sonia Lannaman	Great Britain	4	11.45
5	Brenda Matthews	New Zealand	2	11.77
6	María Luisa Vilca	Peru	5	11.85
7	Claudette Powell	Bahamas	3	12.01
-	Nadezhda Bezfamilnaya	Soviet Union	7	DNS

== Quarterfinals ==
Top four in each heat advanced to semifinal round (blue).

=== Quarterfinal 1 ===
Rank	Athlete	Nation	Lane	Time
1	Silvia Chivás	Cuba	3	11.22
2	Raelene Boyle	Australia	7	11.30
3	Barbara Ferrell	United States	5	11.38
4	Esther Shakhamorov	Israel	6	11.46
5	Ellen Strophal	East Germany	8	11.48
6	Anita Neil	Great Britain	2	11.58
7	Cecilia Molinari	Italy	1	11.63
8	Brenda Matthews	New Zealand	4	11.87

=== Quarterfinal 2 ===
Rank	Athlete	Nation	Lane	Time
1	Renate Stecher	East Germany	5	11.27
2	Irena Szewińska	Poland	6	11.49
T3	Ingrid Becker	West Germany	4	11.52
T3	Rosie Allwood	Jamaica	8	11.52
5	Sonia Lannaman	Great Britain	7	11.72
6	Pam Kilborn	Australia	1	11.85
7	Hannah Afriyie	Ghana	2	12.04
8	Laura Nappi	Italy	3	12.13

=== Quarterfinal 3 ===
Rank	Athlete	Nation	Lane	Time
1	Annegret Richter	West Germany	8	11.33
2	Eva Glesková	Czechoslovakia	7	11.43
3	Alice Anum	Ghana	5	11.45
4	Andrea Lynch	Great Britain	3	11.57
5	Sylviane Telliez	France	6	11.64
6	Mattiline Render	United States	2	11.67
7	Marion Hoffman	Australia	4	11.78
8	Galina Bukharina	Soviet Union	1	11.81

=== Quarterfinal 4 ===
Rank	Athlete	Nation	Lane	Time
1	Iris Davis	United States	1	11.27
2	Elfgard Schittenhelm	West Germany	8	11.42
3	Carmen Valdés	Cuba	6	11.46
4	Lyudmila Zharkova	Soviet Union	4	11.46
5	Wilma van Gool	Netherlands	7	11.47
6	Ivanka Valkova	Bulgaria	5	11.48
7	Evelin Kaufer	East Germany	3	11.55
8	Juana Mosquera	Colombia	2	11.66

== Semifinals ==
Top four in each heat advanced to the final round (blue).

=== Semifinal 1 ===
Rank	Athlete	Nation	Lane	Time
1	Renate Stecher	East Germany	2	11.18
2	Iris Davis	United States	3	11.36
3	Eva Glesková	Czechoslovakia	1	11.43
4	Alice Anum	Ghana	4	11.47
5	Elfgard Schittenhelm	West Germany	6	11.49
6	Carmen Valdés	Cuba	8	11.52
7	Ingrid Becker	West Germany	7	11.53
8	Rosie Allwood	Jamaica	5	11.58

=== Semifinal 2 ===
Rank	Athlete	Nation	Lane	Time
1	Raelene Boyle	Australia	8	11.32
2	Silvia Chivás	Cuba	6	11.33
3	Annegret Richter	West Germany	7	11.39
4	Barbara Ferrell	United States	4	11.49
5	Esther Shakhamorov	Israel	1	11.49
6	Irena Szewińska	Poland	2	11.54
7	Andrea Lynch	Great Britain	5	11.64
8	Lyudmila Zharkova	Soviet Union	3	11.67

== Final ==
Rank	Athlete	Nation	Lane	Time	Notes
1st place, gold medalist(s)	Renate Stecher	East Germany	3	11.07	WR
2nd place, silver medalist(s)	Raelene Boyle	Australia	1	11.23	
3rd place, bronze medalist(s)	Silvia Chivás	Cuba	6	11.24	
4	Iris Davis	United States	4	11.32	
5	Annegret Richter	West Germany	2	11.38	
6	Alice Anum	Ghana	8	11.41	
7	Barbara Ferrell	United States	5	11.45	
8	Eva Glesková	Czechoslovakia	7	12.48	

Key: WR = world record; DNS = did not start; T = Tie
