= Rita Hendricks =

United States Virgin Islands sprinter

Personal information
- Nationality: American Virgin Islander
- Born: January 31, 1956 (age 69)

Sport
- Sport: Sprinting
- Event: 100 metres

Rita Hendricks (born January 31, 1956) is a sprinter who represents the United States Virgin Islands. She competed in the women's 100 metres at the 1976 Summer Olympics.
