= Rubin Teitelbaum =

Estonian-Jewish weightlifter (1907–1941)

- Born: 17 January 1907; Tapa
- Died: 4 September 1941 (aged 34); Tallinn
- Occupation: Weightlifter

Rubin Teitelbaum (17 January 1907 – 4 September 1941) was an Estonian-Jewish weightlifter.

He was born in Tapa. His younger sister was a track and field athlete, basketball and volleyball player Sara Teitelbaum.

He started his weightlifting exercising in 1925 at the gymnastics association "Sport". He was a member of Estonian national weightlifting team. He was a 7-times Estonian champion.

He was killed in Tallinn in 1941 following the German occupation of Estonia during World War II during the Holocaust in Estonia.
