= Missie Misomali =

Malawian sprinter (born 1950)

Personal information
- Nationality: Malawian
- Born: 9 October 1950 (age 76) Blantyre, Malawi
- Died: 25th November 2001

Sport
- Sport: Sprinting
- Event: 100 metres

Missie Misomali (born 9 October 1950) is a Malawian sprinter. She competed in the women's 100 metres at the 1972 Summer Olympics.
