= Larry Brown (sprinter) =

American sprinter

Personal information
- Born: March 23, 1951 (age 75) Jersey City, New Jersey, United States

Sport
- Sport: Track and field
Medal record
Representing the United States
Pan American Games
Gold medal – first place	1975 Mexico City	4 x 100 m relay
Summer Universiade
Gold medal – first place	1973 Moscow	4 x 100 m relay

Larry Brown (born March 23, 1951) is an American retired sprinter.

Brown didn't begin competing in sprinting until he was a senior in high school. Originally from Jersey City, New Jersey, he first competed for Essex County College, during which time he was a gold medalist in the 4 × 100 metres relay at the 1973 World University Games.

Brown then transferred to the Arizona Wildcats track and field team. He won the 1974 and 1975 Western Athletic Conference outdoor championships in the 100 yards and 220 yards. He won the 1975 220 yards race in 20.17 seconds with a 4.64 miles per hour (2.07 m/s) tailwind. In 1975, he won the 4 × 100 m gold medal at the Pan American Games.
