= Barbara Wilson (sprinter) =

Australian sprinter

Personal information
- Born: 5 May 1952 (age 74)

Sport
- Sport: Track and field

Barbara Ellen Wilson (née Jordan; born 5 May 1952) is an Australian former sprinter who competed in the 1976 Summer Olympics. She was a member of Australia's 4 × 100 metres relay, which finished in fifth position.

In 1976 she was a member of the Australian 4 × 200 metres relay team that broke the world record in a special time trial in Brisbane.
