= Chantal Corbrejaud =

French sprinter

Personal information
- Nationality: French
- Born: 25 July 1954 (age 71)

Sport
- Sport: Sprinting
- Event: 4 × 100 metres relay

Chantal Corbrejaud (born 25 July 1954) is a French sprinter. She competed in the women's 4 × 100 metres relay at the 1976 Summer Olympics.
