= Lucila Salao =

Filipino sprinter

Personal information
- Nationality: Filipino
- Born: January 27, 1956 (age 70)
- Height: 5 ft 4 in (162 cm)
- Weight: 126 lb (57 kg)

Sport
- Sport: Sprinting
- Event: 4 × 100 metres relay

Lucila Salao-Tolentino (born January 27, 1956) is a Filipino sprinter. She competed in the women's 4 × 100 metres relay at the 1972 Summer Olympics. She was also the holder of the Philippine national record (14.3) in the 100 meter hurdles.
