= Freida Nicholls-Davy =

Barbadian sprinter (born 1950)

Personal information
- Nationality: Barbadian
- Born: 13 May 1950 (age 75)
- Height: 1.67 m (5 ft 6 in)
- Weight: 61 kg (134 lb)

Sport
- Sport: Sprinting
- Event: 100 metres

Freida Nicholls-Davy (born 13 March 1950) is a Barbadian sprinter. She competed in the women's 100 metres at the 1972 Summer Olympics. She also competed in the women's 200 metres at the 1976 Summer Olympics. Nicholls won a bronze medal in the 4 x 100 metres relay at the 1966 Central American and Caribbean Games.

== International competitions ==
| Year | Competition | Venue | Position | Event | Notes |
Representing Barbados
| 1966 | Central American and Caribbean Games | San Juan, Puerto Rico | 8th (sf) | 100 m | 12.4 |
| 1966 | Central American and Caribbean Games | San Juan, Puerto Rico | 3rd | 4 × 100 m relay | 49.5 |
| 1972 | Olympic Games | Munich, West Germany | 38th (h) | 100 m | 12.16 |
| 1975 | Pan American Games | Mexico City, Mexico | 10th (sf) | 100 m | 11.85 |
| 1975 | Pan American Games | Mexico City, Mexico | 10th (sf) | 200 m | 24.21 |
| 1975 | Pan American Games | Mexico City, Mexico | 13th (h) | 400 m | 56.66 |
| 1976 | Olympic Games | Montreal, Canada | 28th (qf) | 200 m | 24.27 |
| 1977 | Central American and Caribbean Championships | Xalapa, Mexico | 3rd | 200 m | 24.05 |
| 1978 | Commonwealth Games | Edmonton, Canada | 19th (h) | 200 m | 24.07 |
| 1978 | Commonwealth Games | Edmonton, Canada | 18th (h) | 400 m | 54.93 |

== Personal bests ==
- 100 metres – 11.3h (1977)
- 200 metres – 23.2h (1978)
