= Silvia Schinzel =

Austrian sprinter

Personal information
- Nationality: Austrian
- Born: 2 June 1958 (age 67)

Sport
- Sport: Sprinting
- Event: 200 metres

Silvia Schinzel (born 2 June 1958) is an Austrian sprinter. She competed in the women's 200 metres at the 1976 Summer Olympics.
