= Carla Bodendorf =

East German sprinter

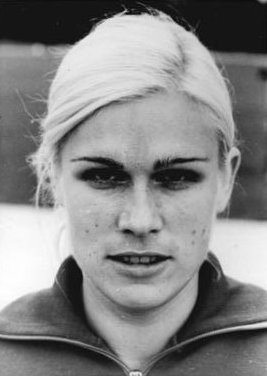
- Carla Bodendorf in 1978

Personal information
- Born: 13 August 1953 (age 73) Eilsleben, Bezirk Magdeburg, East Germany
- Height: 1.64 m (5 ft 5 in)
- Weight: 58 kg (128 lb)

Sport
- Sport: Sprint running
- Club: SC Magdeburg
Medal record
Women's athletics
Representing East Germany
Olympic Games
Gold medal – first place	1976 Montreal	4×100 m
European Championships
Bronze medal – third place	1978 Prague	200 m
Bronze medal – third place	1978 Prague	4×100 m

Carla Bodendorf, née Carla Rietig, (born 13 August 1953) is a retired East German sprint runner who won a gold medal in the 4 × 100 m relay at the 1976 Summer Olympics; individually she finished fourth in the 200 meters. She won two bronze medals in these events at the 1978 European Athletics Championships.

She was part of two East German 4 × 100 relay teams that held the world record for three years from 1976 to 1979.

After retiring from competitions, Bodendorf worked as a sports teacher, and then became a politician and project manager at the Ministry of Internal Affairs of Saxony-Anhalt. She is married to Jürgen Bodendorf, a long and triple jumper and a football coach.
