= 1973 European Athletics Indoor Championships – Women's 4 × 170 metres relay =

The women's 4 × 170 metres relay event at the 1973 European Athletics Indoor Championships was held on 10 March in Rotterdam. Each athlete ran one lap of the 170 metres track.

== Results ==
Rank	Nation	Competitors	Time	Notes
1st place, gold medalist(s)	West Germany	Christiane Krause; Annegret Richter; Ingeborg Helten; Rita Wilden	1:21.15	
2nd place, silver medalist(s)	Austria	Brigitte Haest; Christa Kepplinger; Carmen Mähr; Karoline Käfer	1:23.33	
