= Antoinette Gauthier =

Haitian sprinter

Personal information
- Nationality: Haitian
- Born: 8 March 1955 (age 70)

Sport
- Sport: Sprinting
- Event: 100 metres

Antoinette Gauthier (born 8 March 1955) is a Haitian sprinter. She competed in the women's 100 metres at the 1976 Summer Olympics.
