= Marie-Louise Pierre =

Haitian sprinter

Personal information
- Nationality: Haitian
- Born: 25 August 1955 (age 70)

Sport
- Sport: Sprinting
- Event: 200 metres

Marie-Louise Pierre (born 25 August 1955) is a Haitian sprinter. She competed in the women's 200 metres at the 1976 Summer Olympics.
