= Beatrice Lungu =

Zambian sprinter

Personal information
- Nationality: Zambian
- Born: 23 November 1956 (age 68)

Sport
- Sport: Sprinting
- Event: 100 metres

Beatrice Lungu (born 23 November 1956) is a Zambian sprinter. She competed in the women's 100 metres at the 1972 Summer Olympics.
