= Joanne McTaggart =

Canadian sprinter

Personal information
- Born: 29 November 1954 (age 70) Regina, Saskatchewan, Canada

Sport
- Sport: Sprinting
- Event: 200 metres

Joanne McTaggart (born 29 November 1954) is a Canadian sprinter. She competed in the women's 200 metres at the 1976 Summer Olympics. She won a gold medal in the 1975 Pan American Games 4 × 400 metres relay (with Joyce Sadowick, Margaret McGowen and Rachelle Campbell) and a bronze medal in the 1975 Pan American Games 4 × 100 metres relay (with Marjorie Bailey, Joyce Sadowick and Patty Loverock).
