= Udo Schmuck =

German footballer and manager

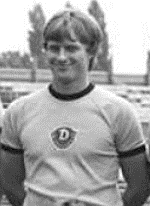
- Schmuck with Dresden in 1980.

Personal information
- Date of birth: 29 October 1952 (age 73)
- Place of birth: Frankenthal, East Germany
- Position: Defender

Senior career*
Years	Team	Apps	(Gls)
1972–1985	Dynamo Dresden	236	(33)

International career
1976–1982	East Germany	7	(1)

Managerial career
- 1988–1991: FSV Zwickau
- 1996: Dynamo Dresden
- 1999–2001: Bischofswerdaer FV
- 200?–2007: VfB Chemnitz
- 2007–2008: BSV 1968 Sebnitz
- * Club domestic league appearances and goals

Udo Schmuck (born 29 October 1952) is a German former footballer.

== Club career ==
He appeared for Dynamo Dresden in more than 230 East German top-flight matches.

== International career ==
Schmuck won seven caps for East Germany.

== Trivia ==
He is married to the Olympic medal-winning athlete Evelin Kaufer and has two sons, one of whom, Thomas, is also a footballer.
