= Debra Armstrong =

American sprinter (born 1954)

Deborah Sue Armstrong (née Edwards; born November 9, 1954, in Taylor, Texas) is an American former sprinter. Armstrong competed in the 400 metres (heats) of the 1972 Summer Olympics and the 200 metres (semi-final) and the 4 × 100 metres relay (seventh place) of the 1976 Summer Olympics.

In 1975 she was US champion in the 200 metres.

She is married to Trinidad and Tobago sprinter Ainsley Armstrong. Their son Aaron Armstrong competes for Trinidad and Tobago, winning a gold medal in the 2008 Olympics.
