= Martina Blos =

German sprinter

Personal information
- Nationality: German
- Born: 17 June 1957 (age 68)

Sport
- Sport: Sprinting
- Event: 100 metres

Martina Blos (born 17 June 1957) is a German former sprinter. She competed in the women's 100 metres at the 1976 Summer Olympics representing East Germany.
