= Margaret Howe (athlete) =

Canadian sprinter (born 1958)

Personal information
- Nationality: Canadian
- Born: 11 May 1958 (age 68) Vancouver, British Columbia, Canada

Sport
- Sport: Sprinting
- Event: 100 metres
Medal record
Women's athletics
Representing Canada
Commonwealth Games
Silver medal – second place	1978 Edmonton	4×100 metres relay

Margaret Howe (born 11 May 1958) is a Canadian sprinter. She competed in the women's 100 metres at the 1976 Summer Olympics. She won a silver medal in the 4 x 100 metres relay at the 1978 Commonwealth Games.
