= Sara Teitelbaum =

Estonian volleyball player, basketball player and athletics competitor

Personal information
- Born: 20 July 1910 Tapa, Estonia
- Died: 7 June 1941 (aged 30)

Sport
- Sport: Volleyball, basketball, athletics

Sara Teitelbaum (20 July 1910 – 7 June 1941) was an Estonian volleyball player, basketball player and athletics competitor.

She was born in Tapa. Her older brother was weightlifter Rubin Teitelbaum. She graduated from Tallinn Jews' Gymnasium.

She began her sporting career at the age of 15, coached by Ago Rooseste. She was multiple-times Estonian champion in different athletics disciplines.

She was a member of several basketball clubs, and volleyball clubs. She become multiple-times Estonian champion in basketball and volleyball.

She died on 7 June 1941 due to tuberculosis.

Personal best:

- 60 m: 7,9
- 100 m: 12,8
- 200 m: 26,6
- 400 m: 61,8
- 800 m: 2.30,6
- long jump: 5.42
- shot put: 10.98
- discus throw: 33.74
- javelin throw: 35.94
