= Iris Davis =

American sprinter (1950–2021)

Medal record

Women's athletics

Representing the United States

Pan American Games
Gold medal – first place	1971 Cali	100 m
Gold medal – first place	1971 Cali	4 × 100 m relay

Iris LaVerne Davis-Hicks (April 30, 1950 – September 18, 2021) was an American track and field sprinter who specialized in the 100-meter dash. She was the 1971 Pan American Games champion in that event and also won a gold medal in the 4 × 100-meter relay. She represented the United States at the 1972 Munich Olympics and twice narrowly missed out on a medal: first in the 100 m, placing fourth behind Cuba's Silvia Chivás, then in the relay, where Chivás again outsprinted her to bronze on the final leg.

Davis was born in an African-American family in Pompano Beach, Florida. Nationally she was a four-time champion: twice in the 100 m (1971, 1973) and twice in the 60-meter dash (1972, 1973). She was runner-up in the 100-yard dash in 1969 and 1970, and also had top three placings in the 100 m at the 1972 Olympic trials and the 1972 outdoor championships.

She was a member of the Tigerbelles collegiate team for Tennessee State University, which had a strong history of women's sprinting including double Olympic champion Wyomia Tyus.

== International competitions ==
Year	Competition	Venue	Position	Event	Notes
1971	Pan American Games	Cali, Colombia	1st	100 m	11.25w
1971	Pan American Games	Cali, Colombia	1st	4 × 100 m relay	44.59
1972	Olympic Games	Munich, Germany	4th	100 m	11.32
1972	Olympic Games	Munich, Germany	4th	4 × 100 m relay	43.39

== National titles ==
- USA Outdoor Track and Field Championships
  - 100 m: 1971, 1973
- USA Indoor Track and Field Championships
  - 60 m: 1972, 1973

== See also ==
- List of 100 metres national champions (women)
