= Emilie Edet =

Nigerian sprinter

Personal information
- Nationality: Nigerian
- Born: 26 March 1949 (age 77)

Sport
- Sport: Sprinting
- Event: 100 metres

Emilie Edet (born 9 March 1946) is a Nigerian sprinter. She competed in the women's 100 metres at the 1972 Summer Olympics.
