= Saima Tiik =

Estonian athletics competitor

Saima Tiik (married name Kiviloo; born 22 January 1957) is an Estonian athletics competitor.

She was born in Kohila, Rapla County. In 1975 she graduated from Estonian Sports Gymnasium (TSIK).

She began athletics training under the guidance of Vello Varik. She is multiple-times Estonian champion in different athletics disciplines. 1972–1982 she was a member of Estonian national athletics team.

Personal best:

- 100 m: 11,8 (with wind 11,7)
- 200 m: 24,4
- 100 m hurdles: 13,5
- long jump: 6.14
- heptathlon: 5198
