= Christiane Krause =

German athlete (born 1950)

Personal information
- Born: 14 December 1950 (age 75) Berlin, West Germany

Sport
- Sport: Track and field
Medal record
Representing West Germany
Olympic Games
Gold medal – first place	1972 Munich	4×100 m
European Indoor Championships
Gold medal – first place	1973 Rotterdam	4×170 m

Christiane Krause (born 14 December 1950) is a German athlete who competed mainly in the 100 metres.

She competed for West Germany in the 1972 Summer Olympics held in Munich, Germany in the 4 × 100 metres where she won the gold medal with her teammates Ingrid Becker, Annegret Richter and Heide Rosendahl.
