= Sue Jowett =

New Zealand sprinter (born 1956)

Sue Pavish
Personal information
- Born: Susan Margaret Jowett; 14 September 1956 (age 69) Dunedin, New Zealand
- Occupation: Teacher

Sport
- Country: New Zealand
- Sport: Track and field
- Events: 100 m; 200 m

Susan Margaret Pavish (née Jowett; born 14 September 1956) is a former New Zealand sprinter.

Jowett won the 1976 New Zealand 100 and 200m titles. She then went on to compete in the women's 100 metres at the 1976 Summer Olympics.
