= Bärbel Struppert =

East German sprinter

Personal information
- Born: 26 September 1950 (age 75) Jena, East Germany

Sport
- Sport: Track and field
Medal record
Representing East Germany
Olympic Games
Silver medal – second place	1972 Munich	4 × 100 m relay
Summer Universiade
Bronze medal – third place	1973 Moscow	4 x 100 m relay

Bärbel Struppert (née Schrickel, (born 26 September 1950 in Jena) is a retired East German sprinter who specialised in the 100 metres.

She became European junior champion in 4 × 100 metres relay in 1966. At the 1972 Summer Olympics in Munich she won a silver medal in the 4 × 100 metres relay with her teammates Christina Heinich, Evelin Kaufer and the 100 and 200 m champion Renate Stecher.

She competed for the club SC Motor Jena during her active career. She married the DDR-Oberliga footballer Gerd Struppert.
