= Mattiline Render =

American sprinter

Personal information
- Nationality: American
- Born: February 7, 1947 (age 79) Moreland, Georgia, U.S.
- Height: 167 cm (5 ft 6 in)
- Weight: 53 kg (117 lb)

Sport
- Sport: Athletics
- Event(s): 100 m, 200 m

Achievements and titles
- Personal best(s): 100 m – 11.4 (1972); 200 m – 24.4 (1968)
Medal record
Representing the United States
Pan American Games
Gold medal – first place	1971 Cali	4×100 m

Mattiline Render (born February 17, 1947) is an American sprinter. In 1971 she won a gold medal in the 4 × 100 m relay at the Pan American Games and set a world record in the 4×110 yard relay. The year after, she competed in the 100 m and 4 × 100 m events at the 1972 Summer Olympics and placed fourth in the relay. During her career Render ran for Tennessee State University, Temple University and New York Police Athletic League.
