= Evelin Kaufer =

East German sprinter

Olympic medal record

Women's athletics
Silver medal – second place	1972 Munich	4 × 100 metre relay

Evelin Kaufer (later Schmuck; born 22 February 1953, in Sohland an der Spree) is a retired East German sprinter who competed in the 100 metres.

== Career and family ==
At the 1972 Summer Olympics in Munich Kaufer reached the heats of the 100 m and won a silver medal in the 4 × 100 m relay with her teammates Christina Heinich, Bärbel Struppert and Renate Stecher.

Kaufer competed for the club SC Einheit Dresden during her active career. She married the DDR-Oberliga footballer Udo Schmuck.
