= Catherine Delachanal =

French sprinter (born 1952)

Personal information
- Born: 4 April 1952 (age 74) Triel-sur-Seine, France

Sport
- Country: France
- Sport: Track and field
- Event: 400 m
Medal record
Representing France
Mediterranean Games
Gold medal – first place	1975 Algiers	4x100m relay

Catherine Delachanal (born 4 April 1952) is a former French athlete, specialising in the 400 meters.

== Biography ==
Catherine Delachanal won three French champion titles for the 400 meters, two outdoor in 1977 and 1979, and one indoor in 1977. She twice set the French record for the 4 × 100 Metres Relay, running 44.2 in 1974, and 43.8 in 1976.

She participated in the 1976 Olympics in Montreal, where she reached the quarterfinals of the 200 meters and was eliminated in the qualifying heats of the 4 × 100 m.

=== Prize list ===
- French Championships in Athletics :
  - 2 times winner of the 400m 1977 and 1979
- Indoor Athletics Championships of France :
  - winner of the 400 m in 1977

=== Records ===
Personal records
Event	Performance	Place	Date
100 m	11.5		1976
200 m	23.0		1976
400 m	52.8		1976
