= Debbie Wells =

Australian sprinter

Debbie Wells (born 29 May 1961) is an Australian former sprinter who competed in the 1976 Summer Olympics, 1980 Summer Olympics, and the 1984 Summer Olympics.

Wells was three times Australian 100 metre champion, and twice Australian 200m champion. She was 1977 Pacific Conference champion in the 4 × 100 m relay, and placed 2nd in both the 100m and 200m.

Wells is from Emmaville, New South Wales, and was known as the "Emmaville Express." She competed in the 1976 Olympics at 15 years of age. She finished fourth in the first qualifying round of the 100 meters. She went through to the second round, where she finished fifth behind Vera Anisimova of the USSR.

She also competed in the 4 X 100 relay in the 1984 Summer Olympics in Los Angeles. She is one of only a few Australians who competed at three Olympic games.

She is currently the head sports coach at Toowoomba Grammar School.
