= Barbados at the Pan American Games =

- IOC code: BAR
- NOC: Barbados Olympic Association
- Medals Ranked 30th: Gold 1 Silver 4 Bronze 13 Total 18

Pan American Games appearances (overview)
- 1963; 1967; 1971; 1975; 1979; 1983; 1987; 1991; 1995; 1999; 2003; 2007; 2011; 2015; 2019; 2023

Barbados at the Pan American Games.

== Pan American Games ==
=== Medals by games ===
Year	Ref.	Edition	Host city	Rank	Gold	Silver	Bronze	Total
1951		I	(Argentina) Buenos Aires	Did not participate				
1955		II	Mexico City	Did not participate				
1959		III	(United States) Chicago	Did not participate				
1963		IV	(Brazil) São Paulo	18th	0	0	3	3
1967		V	(Canada) Winnipeg	15th	0	1	0	1
1971		VI	(Colombia) Cali	19th	0	1	0	1
1975		VII	Mexico City	20th	0	0	1	1
1979		VIII	(Puerto Rico) San Juan	—	0	0	0	0
1983		IX	(Venezuela) Caracas	—	0	0	0	0
1987		X	(United States) Indianapolis	—	0	0	0	0
1991		XI	(Cuba) Havana	—	0	0	0	0
1995		XII	(Argentina) Mar del Plata	—	0	0	0	0
1999		XIII	(Canada) Winnipeg	21st	0	1	1	2
2003		XIV	(Dominican Republic) Santo Domingo	27th	0	0	1	1
2007		XV	(Brazil) Rio de Janeiro	25th	0	0	1	1
2011		XVI	(Mexico) Guadalajara	24th	0	0	2	2
2015		XVII	(Canada) Toronto	20th	0	1	2	3
2019		XVIII	(Peru) Lima	23rd	1	0	0	1
2023		XIX	(Chile) Santiago	30th	0	0	2	2
Total				30th	1	4	13	18

== Winter Pan American Games ==
=== Medals by games ===
Year	Ref.	Edition	Host city	Rank	Gold	Silver	Bronze	Total
1990		I	(Argentina) Las Leñas	Did not participate				
Total				—	0	0	0	0

== Junior Pan American Games ==
=== Medals by games ===
Games	Gold	Silver	Bronze	Total	Rank
(Colombia) 2021 Cali-Valle	0	0	1	1	28th
(Paraguay) 2025 Asunción	Future event				
Total	0	0	1	1	28th

=== Medals by sport ===
Sport	Gold	Silver	Bronze	Total
Swimming	0	0	1	1
Totals (1 entries)	0	0	1	1

=== Medalists ===
Medal	Name	Games	Sport	Event
Bronze	Jack Stewart Kirby	2021 Cali-Valle	Swimming	Men's 100 m backstroke
