= Marjorie Bailey =

Canadian sprinter (born 1947)

Personal information
- Born: 21 November 1947 (age 78) Lockeport, Nova Scotia, Canada

Sport
- Sport: Sprinting
- Event(s): 100 metres, 200 metres, 4 x 100 m relay
Medal record
Women's athletics
Representing Canada
Pan American Games
Bronze medal – third place	1975 Mexico City	4×100 metres relay
Bronze medal – third place	1975 Mexico City	100 metres
Commonwealth Games
Silver medal – second place	1978 Edmonton	4×100 metres relay

Marjorie Bailey (née Turner; born 21 November 1947) is a Canadian sprinter.

At the 1976 Summer Olympics she competed in the women's 100 metres and 200 metres. She made the semi-final round in both events. She ran the anchor leg of the 4 x 100 metre relay, which placed fourth and set a Canadian and Commonwealth record of 43.17.

At the 1978 Commonwealth Games she won a silver medal in the 4 x 100 metres relay.

She won a bronze medal in the 100 metres and 4 x 100 metres relay at the 1975 Pan American Games, and finished fourth in the 200 metres.

She finished fourth in the 200 metres, and sixth in the 100 metres at the 1974 British Commonwealth Games.

She was a descendant of black Loyalists (escaped slaves and freed men and women of African origin who, in the 1780s, fled to Canada from America).
