= Mona-Lisa Pursiainen =

Finnish sprinter (1951–2000)

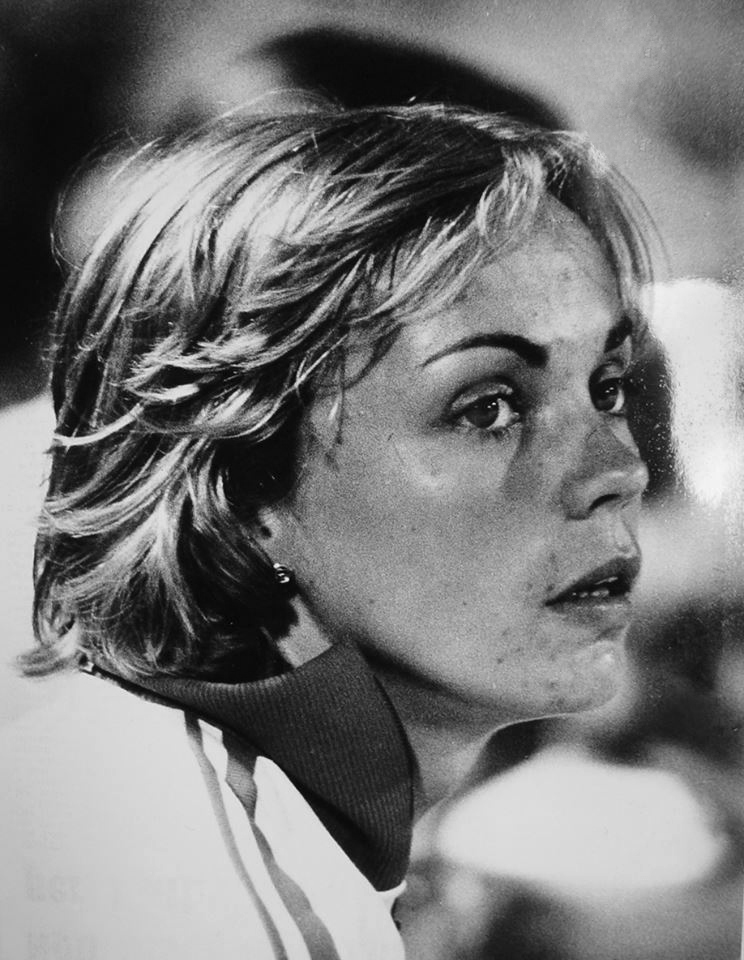
- Pursiainen at the 1974 European Championships

Personal information
- Nationality: Finnish
- Born: Eivor Mona-Lisa Strandvall; 21 June 1951 Kronoby, Finland
- Died: 7 August 2000 (aged 49) Kauniainen, Finland
- Height: 1.71 m (5 ft 7 1/2 in)
- Weight: 58 kg (128 lb; 9.1 st)

Sport
- Sport: Running
- Event(s): 100 m, 200 m
- Club: Gamlakarleby Idrottsförening

Achievements and titles
- Personal best(s): 100m: 11.19 (1973) 200m: 22.39 (1973) 400m: 51.23 (1973)
Medal record
Women's athletics
Representing Finland
European Championships
Silver medal – second place	1974 Rome	4x400 m
Bronze medal – third place	1974 Rome	200 m
Summer Universiade
Gold medal – first place	1973 Moscow	100 m
Gold medal – first place	1973 Moscow	200 m
Silver medal – second place	1975 Rome	100 m
Silver medal – second place	1975 Rome	200 m

Eivor Mona-Lisa Pursiainen, née Strandvall, (21 June 1951, Kronoby — 7 August 2000) was a Finnish female sprinter, who was especially successful in 1973–1974, being ranked #2 in the world over 100 metres and # 3, over 200 metres and 400 metres in 1973. In 1974, she was ranked #7 in the 100 metres and #6 in the 200 metres. She won 100 metres and 200 metres at the 1973 Summer Universiade held in Moscow. She won a bronze medal in the 200 metres at the 1974 European Athletics Championships, as well as a silver medal in the 4 x 400 metres relay, and helped Finland to a National Record of 3:25.7. She would take two silver medals over the 100 metres and 200 metres at the 1975 Summer Universiade in Rome.

Pursiainen died in 2000 from breast cancer, aged 49, at Kauniainen. She had been diagnosed with breast cancer ten years earlier. She was seemingly completely cured, but the disease eventually spread to her bones.
