= Chandra Cheeseborough =

American sprinter

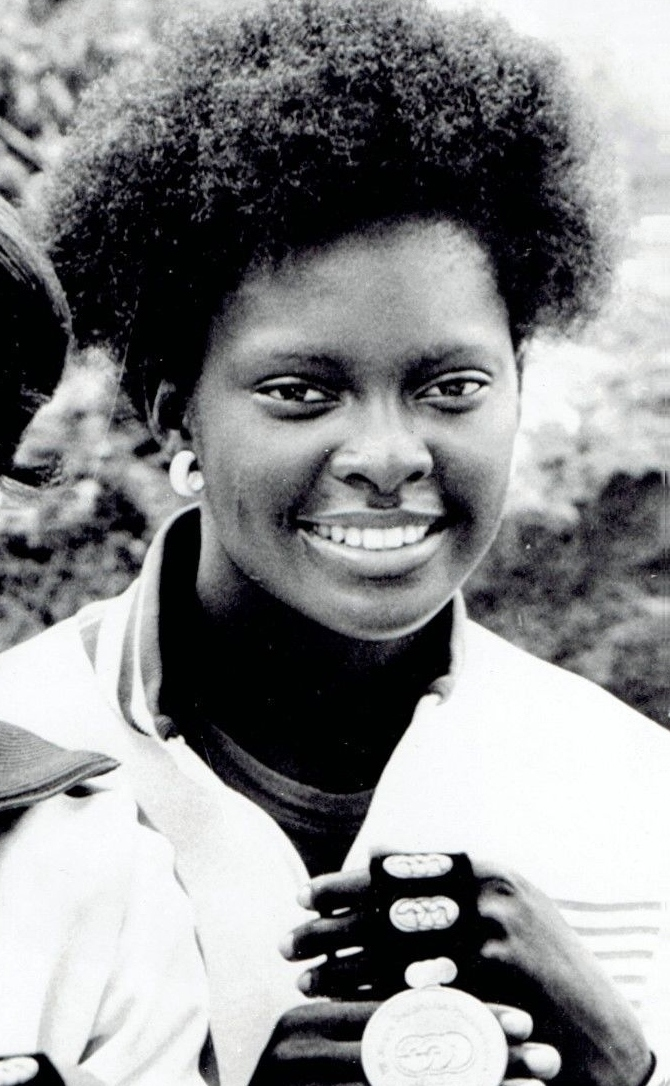
- Cheeseborough at the 1975 Pan American Games

Personal information
- Full name: Chandra Danette Cheeseborough
- Born: January 10, 1959 (age 67) Jacksonville, Florida, U.S.
- Height: 165 cm (5 ft 5 in)
- Weight: 58 kg (128 lb)

Sport
- Sport: Athletics
- Event: sprint

Achievements and titles
- Personal bests: 100 m – 11.13 (1976); 200 m – 21.99 (1983); 400 m – 49.05 (1984)
Medal record
Representing the United States
Olympic Games
| Gold medal – first place | 1984 Los Angeles | 4 × 100 m relay |
| Gold medal – first place | 1984 Los Angeles | 4 × 400 m |
| Silver medal – second place | 1984 Los Angeles | 400 m |
Pan American Games
| Gold medal – first place | 1975 Mexico City | 200 m |
| Gold medal – first place | 1975 Mexico City | 4 × 100 m |
| Gold medal – first place | 1979 San Juan | 4 × 100 m |
Liberty Bell Classic (Olympic Boycott Games)
| Gold medal – first place | 1980 Philadelphia | 100 m |
| Gold medal – first place | 1980 Philadelphia | 4 × 100 m |
| Silver medal – second place | 1980 Philadelphia | 200 m |

Chandra Danette Cheeseborough (later Shellman, born January 10, 1959) is a retired American sprinter. She won two gold medals and a silver at the 1984 Summer Olympics in Los Angeles.

== Track and field ==
Cheeseborough broke onto the international track scene at age 16 by winning two gold medals at the 1975 Pan American Games, taking the 200 m in an American record time of 22.77 seconds. In 1976, she set the World junior record at 11.13 seconds by placing second at the U.S. Olympic trials, she then placed sixth in that event at the Montreal Olympic Games.

Cheeseborough graduated from Jean Ribault High School in Jacksonville, Florida in 1977, where she set the still standing NFHS national high school records in both the 100 yard (10.3) and 220 yard (23.3) dashes. The federation converted record-keeping to metric distances shortly afterward. Next she attended Tennessee State, where she was a member of national championship teams that set world indoor records of 1:08.9 minutes in the 640-yard relay and 1:47.17 in the 800-yard sprint medley relay. She qualified for the 1980 U.S. Olympic team but was unable to compete due to the 1980 Summer Olympics boycott. She did however receive one of 461 Congressional Gold Medals created especially for the spurned athletes. She won the national indoor 200-yard dash in 1979, 1981, 1982 and 1983.

Cheeseborough's breakthrough year in the 400 m came in 1984, when she set two American records in the event, then placed second in the Los Angeles Olympics in a career best of 49.05. The 49.05 still ranks her as the #10 performer of all time. She made history at the 1984 Games when she became the first woman to win gold medals in both relays, which were held less than an hour apart. Cheeseborough also became only the second athlete, after Paavo Nurmi 60 years earlier, to win two separate Olympic running events in a single day.

== Coach ==
Cheeseborough later became a coach and returned to Tennessee State. She was named head coach of both men and women in 1999. She also has served as an assistant coach for the U.S. team at the 1999 Junior Pan-Am Championships. In March 2007 it was announced that Cheeseborough would be the assistant coach for the 2008 Olympic team. Cheeseborough coached the sprints and hurdles for the 2008 Beijing Olympics. As head women’s track and cross-country coach at Tennessee State, her alma mater, she led the Tigerbelles to six Ohio Valley Conference championships.
