= Carol Cummings =

Jamaican sprinter (born 1949)

Personal information
- Nationality: Jamaican
- Born: 15 November 1949 (age 76)

Sport
- Sport: Sprinting
- Event: 100 metres

Carol Cummings (born 15 November 1949) is a Jamaican sprinter. She competed in the women's 100 metres at the 1976 Summer Olympics.

Cummings competed in the AIAW for the Prairie View A&M Lady Panthers track and field team, finishing 4th in the 100 yards at the 1975 AIAW Outdoor Track and Field Championships.
