= Patty Loverock =

Canadian sprinter

Personal information
- Nationality: Canadian
- Born: 21 February 1953 (age 73) Vancouver, British Columbia, Canada
- Height: 173 cm (5 ft 8 in)
- Weight: 59 kg (130 lb)

Sport
- Sport: Athletics
- Event: Sprinting
Medal record
Women's athletics
Representing Canada
Pan American Games
Silver medal – second place	1975 Mexico City	100 metres
Bronze medal – third place	1975 Mexico City	4×100 metres relay
Commonwealth Games
Silver medal – second place	1978 Edmonton	4×100 metres relay
Universiade
Bronze medal – third place	1975 Rome	100 metres
Pacific Conference Games
Silver medal – second place	1973 Toronto	4x100 m relay
Bronze medal – third place	1977 Canberra	4x100 m relay

Patty Elaine Loverock (born 21 February 1953) is a Canadian retired sprinter who competed at the 1976 Summer Olympics.

== Biography ==
Loverock won a bronze medal in the 4 x 100 relay at the 1970 British Commonwealth Games. The following year she finished third behind fellow Canadian Stephanie Berto in the 200 metres at the British 1971 WAAA Championships. At the 1971 Pan American Games Loverock finished eighth in the 200 metres.

She would finished eighth in the 200 metres at the 1974 Commonwealth Games in Christchurch. She won a silver medal in the same event at the 1978 Games in Edmonton.

She won a silver and bronze medal in the 4 x 100 metres relay at two Pacific Conference Games in 1973 and 1977.She finished second in the 1975 Pan American Games 100 metres and third in the 4 × 100 metres relay and won a bronze medal at the World Student Games in Rome.

At the 1976 Olympics Games in Montreal, she represented Canada in the women's 100 metres and 200 metres, where she got to the semi-finals in both events. She set a Canadian record of 23.03 in her quarter-final of the women's 200 metres. Loverock ran second leg of the women's 4 x 100 metres relay at the Olympics, the team set a Canadian and Commonwealth record of 43.17 second finishing in 4th place.

In 1978 she set a world indoor record for 60 yards, with a time of 6.78. Patty also set the Canadian record for the 100 metres with at time of 11.34, in 1975.
