= 1974 European Athletics Championships – Women's 400 metres =

Women's 400 metres at the European Athletics Championships
- Venue: Stadio Olimpico
- Location: Rome, Italy
- Dates: 2, 3, and 4 September 1974
- Competitors: 23 from 14 nations
- Winning time: 50.14 s CR NR

Medalists
gold medal	Riitta Salin	Finland
silver medal	Ellen Streidt	East Germany
bronze medal	Rita Wilden	West Germany

The women's 400 metres at the 1974 European Athletics Championships was held in Rome, Italy, at Stadio Olimpico on 2, 3, and 4 September 1974.

== Results ==
=== Heats ===
2 September

==== Heat 1 ====
Rank	Name	Nationality	Time	Notes
1	Natalya Sokolova	Soviet Union	53.21	Q
2	Jozefína Čerchlanová	Czechoslovakia	53.23	Q
3	Danuta Piecyk	Poland	53.30	Q
4	Donna Hartley	Great Britain	53.49	
5	Dominique Forest	France	55.35	
	Mariana Suman	Romania	DNS	

==== Heat 2 ====
Rank	Name	Nationality	Time	Notes
1	Riitta Salin	Finland	51.88	Q
2	Angelika Handt	East Germany	52.21	Q
3	Krystyna Kacperczyk	Poland	52.76	Q
4	Jannette Roscoe	Great Britain	53.28	q
5	Trudy Wunderink	Netherlands	53.30	q
6	Claire Walsh	Ireland	54.15	

==== Heat 3 ====
Rank	Name	Nationality	Time	Notes
1	Ellen Streidt	East Germany	51.79	Q
2	Rita Wilden	West Germany	51.91	Q
3	Karoline Käfer	Austria	52.20	Q
4	Rosine Wallez	Belgium	52.82	NR q
5	Ingrīda Barkāne	Soviet Union	53.01	q
6	Genowefa Błaszak	Poland	53.34	

==== Heat 4 ====
Rank	Name	Nationality	Time	Notes
1	Nadezhda Ilyina	Soviet Union	52.30	Q
2	Verona Bernard	Great Britain	52.46	Q
3	Jelica Pavličić	Yugoslavia	53.11	Q
4	Pirjo Häggman	Finland	53.43	
5	Karola Claus	West Germany	54.26	
6	Iren Orosz	Hungary	54.90	
	Lacramioara Diaconiuc	Romania	DNS	

=== Semi-finals ===
3 September

==== Semi-final 1 ====
Rank	Name	Nationality	Time	Notes
1	Ellen Streidt	East Germany	51.40	CR Q
2	Rita Wilden	West Germany	51.46	Q
3	Nadezhda Ilyina	Soviet Union	51.65	Q
4	Jelica Pavličić	Yugoslavia	51.87	Q
5	Krystyna Kacperczyk	Poland	52.07	
6	Jannette Roscoe	Great Britain	52.85	
7	Rosine Wallez	Belgium	53.02	
8	Trudy Wunderink	Netherlands	53.46	

==== Semi-final 2 ====
Rank	Name	Nationality	Time	Notes
1	Riitta Salin	Finland	51.46	Q
2	Angelika Handt	East Germany	51.67	Q
3	Karoline Käfer	Austria	52.14	NR Q
4	Verona Bernard	Great Britain	52.18	Q
5	Ingrīda Barkāne	Soviet Union	52.52	
6	Danuta Piecyk	Poland	52.93	
7	Jozefína Čerchlanová	Czechoslovakia	53.77	
8	Natalya Sokolova	Soviet Union	53.82	

=== Final ===
4 September

Rank	Name	Nationality	Time	Notes
1st place, gold medalist(s)	Riitta Salin	Finland	50.14	NR CR
2nd place, silver medalist(s)	Ellen Streidt	East Germany	50.69	NR
3rd place, bronze medalist(s)	Rita Wilden	West Germany	50.88	NR
4	Nadezhda Ilyina	Soviet Union	51.22	NR
5	Angelika Handt	East Germany	51.24	
6	Karoline Käfer	Austria	51.77	NR
7	Verona Bernard	Great Britain	52.61	
8	Jelica Pavličić	Yugoslavia	53.01	
