= Athletics at the 1976 Summer Olympics – Women's 4 × 400 metres relay =

Women's 4 × 400 metres relay at the Games of the XXI Olympiad
- Venue: Olympic Stadium
- Dates: 30–31 July 1976
- Competitors: from 20 nations

Medalists
1st place, gold medalist(s)		Doris Maletzki, Brigitte Rohde, Ellen Streidt, Christina Brehmer	East Germany
2nd place, silver medalist(s)		Debra Sapenter, Sheila Ingram, Pamela Jiles, Rosalyn Bryant	United States
3rd place, bronze medalist(s)		Inta Kļimoviča, Lyudmila Aksyonova, Natalya Sokolova, Nadezhda Ilyina	Soviet Union

These are the official results of the women's 4 × 400 metres relay event at the 1976 Summer Olympics in Montreal, Quebec, Canada. The event was held on 30 and 31 July 1976. There were a total number of 11 nations competing.

== Medalists ==
Gold	Silver	Bronze
East Germany; Doris Maletzki; Brigitte Rohde; Ellen Streidt; Christina Brehmer	United States; Debra Sapenter; Sheila Ingram; Pamela Jiles; Rosalyn Bryant	Soviet Union; Inta Kļimoviča; Lyudmila Aksyonova; Natalya Sokolova; Nadezhda Ilyina

== Records ==
These were the standing World and Olympic records (in seconds) prior to the 1976 Summer Olympics.

World record	3:22.95	(East Germany) Dagmar Käsling (East Germany) Rita Kühne (East Germany) Helga Seidler (East Germany) Monika Zehrt	Munich (FRG)	10 September 1972
Olympic record	3:22.95	(East Germany) Dagmar Käsling (East Germany) Rita Kühne (East Germany) Helga Seidler (East Germany) Monika Zehrt	Munich (FRG)	10 September 1972

== Results ==
=== Final ===
- Held on 31 July 1976

RANK	NATION	ATHLETES	TIME
Gold medal	East Germany	• Doris Maletzki • Brigitte Rohde • Ellen Streidt • Christina Brehmer	3:19.23 (WR)
Silver medal	United States	• Debra Sapenter • Sheila Ingram • Pamela Jiles • Rosalyn Bryant	3:22.81
Bronze medal	Soviet Union	• Inta Kļimoviča • Lyudmila Aksyonova • Natalya Sokolova • Nadezhda Ilyina	3:24.24
4.	Australia	• Judy Canty • Verna Burnard • Charlene Rendina • Bethanie Nail	3:25.56
5.	West Germany	• Claudia Steger • Dagmar Fuhrmann • Elke Barth • Rita Wilden	3:25.71
6.	Finland	• Marika Lindholm • Pirjo Häggman • Mona-Lisa Pursiainen • Riitta Salin	3:25.87
7.	Great Britain	• Liz Barnes • Gladys Taylor • Verona Elder • Donna Murray	3:28.01
8.	Canada	• Margaret Stride • Joyce Yakubowich • Rachelle Campbell • Yvonne Saunders	3:28.91

=== Semifinals ===
- Held on 30 July 1976

==== Heat 1 ====
RANK	NATION	ATHLETES	TIME
1.	Soviet Union	• Inta Kļimoviča • Lyudmila Aksyonova • Natalya Sokolova • Nadezhda Ilyina	3:24.54
2.	United States	• Debra Sapenter • Sheila Ingram • Pamela Jiles • Rosalyn Bryant	3:25.15
3.	Finland	• Pirjo Häggman • Marika Lindholm • Mona-Lisa Pursiainen • Riitta Salin	3:26.30
4.	West Germany	• Claudia Steger • Rita Wilden • Dagmar Fuhrmann • Elke Barth	3:26.31
—	Jamaica	• Helen Blake • Carol Cummings • Jacqueline Pusey • Ruth Williams-Simpson	DSQ

==== Heat 2 ====
RANK	NATION	ATHLETES	TIME
1.	East Germany	• Doris Maletzki • Brigitte Rohde • Ellen Streidt • Christina Brehmer	3:23.38
2.	Australia	• Judy Canty • Verna Burnard • Charlene Rendina • Bethanie Nail	3:25.98
3.	Great Britain	• Liz Barnes • Gladys Taylor • Verona Elder • Donna Murray	3:27.09
4.	Canada	• Margaret Stride • Joyce Yakubowich • Rachelle Campbell • Yvonne Saunders	3:28.81
5.	Bulgaria	• Yordanka Ivanova • Svetla Zlateva • Ivanka Bonova • Liliana Tomova	3:31.08
6.	Belgium	• Lea Alaerts • Regine Berg • Anne-Marie Van Nuffel • Rita Thijs	3:32.87
