= Athletics at the 1976 Summer Olympics – Women's 400 metres =

Women's 400 metres at the Games of the XXI Olympiad
- Venue: Olympic Stadium
- Date: 25–29 July 1976
- Competitors: 40 from 19 nations
- Winning time: 49.29 WR

Medalists
1st place, gold medalist(s)		Irena Szewińska; Poland
2nd place, silver medalist(s)		Christina Lathan; East Germany
3rd place, bronze medalist(s)		Ellen Streidt; East Germany

The Women's 400 metres competition at the 1976 Summer Olympics in Montreal, Quebec, Canada was held at the Olympic Stadium on 25–29 July.

The winning margin was an impressive 1.23 seconds, which as of 2023 remains the only time the women's Olympic 400 metres has been won by more than a second.

== Competition format ==
The Women's 400m competition consisted of heats (Round 1), quarterfinals, semifinals and a final. The five fastest competitors from each race in the heats plus the next two fastest overall qualified for the Quarterfinals. The four fastest competitors from each of the Quarterfinal races qualified for the Semifinals, where again the four fastest runners from each heat, advanced to the final.

== Records ==
Prior to the competition, the existing World and Olympic records were as follows:

World record	Irena Szewińska (POL)	49.75	Bydgoszcz, Poland	22 June 1976
Olympic record	Monika Zehrt (GDR)	51.08	Munich, West Germany	7 September 1972

== Results ==
=== Round 1 ===
Qual. rule: first 5 of each heat (Q) plus the two fastest times (q) qualified.

==== Heat 1 ====
Rank	Athlete	Nation	Time	Notes
1	Christina Brehmer	East Germany	52.45	Q
2	Verona Bernard-Elder	Great Britain	52.60	Q
3	Rita Wilden	West Germany	53.08	Q
4	Lorna Forde	Barbados	53.93	Q
5	Rachelle Campbell	Canada	54.54	Q
—	Marième Boye	Senegal	DNS	
—	Rita Hendricks	Virgin Islands	DNS	

==== Heat 2 ====
Rank	Athlete	Nation	Time	Notes
1	Debra Sapenter	United States	52.33	Q
2	Donna Hartley	Great Britain	52.75	Q
3	Marita Koch	East Germany	52.78	Q
4	Regina Berg	Belgium	53.66	Q
5	Silvia Hollmann	West Germany	53.73	Q
6	Helen Blake	Jamaica	53.93	
7	Ileana Hocking	Puerto Rico	57.85	

==== Heat 3 ====
Rank	Athlete	Nation	Time	Notes
1	Ellen Streidt	East Germany	52.56	Q
2	Christiane Wildschek	Austria	52.65	Q
3	Judy Canty	Australia	52.88	Q
4	Marilyn Neufville	Jamaica	52.93	Q
5	Rosine Wallez	Belgium	52.94	Q
6	Jelica Pavličić	Yugoslavia	54.11	
—	Chee Swee Lee	Singapore	DNS	

==== Heat 4 ====
Rank	Athlete	Nation	Time	Notes
1	Sheila Ingram	United States	51.83	Q
2	Nataliya Sokolova	Soviet Union	52.45	Q
3	Irena Szewińska	Poland	52.75	Q
4	Joyce Yakubowich	Canada	53.35	Q
5	Gladys Taylor	Great Britain	53.46	Q
6	Marika Lindholm	Finland	53.64	q
7	Célestine N'Drin	Ivory Coast	54.13	

==== Heat 5 ====
Rank	Athlete	Nation	Time	Notes
1	Rosalyn Bryant	United States	52.01	Q
2	Riitta Salin	Finland	52.57	Q
3	Lyudmila Aksyonova	Soviet Union	52.90	Q
4	Bethanie Nail	Australia	52.98	Q
5	Ruth Williams-Simpson	Jamaica	54.07	Q
6	Helen Ritter	Liechtenstein	58.52	
—	Debbie Jones	Bermuda	DNS	

==== Heat 6 ====
Rank	Athlete	Nation	Time	Notes
1	Nadezhda Ilyina	Soviet Union	51.97	Q
2	Verna Burnard	Australia	52.10	Q
3	Dagmar Fuhrmann	West Germany	52.58	Q
4	Pirjo Häggman	Finland	52.73	Q
5	Margaret Stride	Canada	53.21	Q
6	Rita Bottiglieri	Italy	53.37	q
7	Rose-Marie Gauthier	Haiti	1:13.27	

=== Quarterfinals ===
==== Heat 1 ====
Rank	Athlete	Nation	Time	Notes
1	Sheila Ingram	United States	51.31	Q
2	Ellen Streidt	East Germany	51.33	Q
3	Pirjo Häggman	Finland	51.65	Q
4	Lyudmila Aksyonova	Soviet Union	51.73	Q
5	Dagmar Fuhrmann	West Germany	52.02	
6	Judy Canty	Australia	52.65	
7	Lorna Forde	Barbados	53.62	
8	Rachelle Campbell	Canada	54.16	

==== Heat 2 ====
Rank	Athlete	Nation	Time	Notes
1	Nataliya Sokolova	Soviet Union	51.63	Q
2	Christina Brehmer	East Germany	51.67	Q
3	Verna Burnard	Australia	51.79	Q
4	Rita Wilden	West Germany	52.41	Q
5	Gladys Taylor	Great Britain	53.71	
6	Marika Lindholm	Finland	54.07	
7	Margaret Stride	Canada	55.02	
—	Marilyn Neufville	Jamaica	DNS	

==== Heat 3 ====
Rank	Athlete	Nation	Time	Notes
1	Debra Sapenter	United States	51.23	Q
2	Nadezhda Ilyina	Soviet Union	51.32	Q
3	Bethanie Nail	Australia	51.71	Q
4	Christiane Wildschek	Austria	52.25	Q
5	Verona Bernard-Elder	Great Britain	52.70	
6	Rosine Wallez	Belgium	53.04	
7	Silvia Hollmann	West Germany	53.77	
8	Ruth Williams-Simpson	Jamaica	53.88	

==== Heat 4 ====
Rank	Athlete	Nation	Time	Notes
1	Riitta Salin	Finland	51.62	Q
2	Rosalyn Bryant	United States	51.74	Q
3	Marita Koch	East Germany	51.87	Q
4	Irena Szewińska	Poland	52.00	Q
5	Donna Hartley	Great Britain	52.29	
6	Rita Bottiglieri	Italy	52.51	
7	Regina Berg	Belgium	53.14	
8	Joyce Yakubowich	Canada	53.14	

=== Semifinals ===
==== Heat 1 ====
Rank	Athlete	Nation	Time	Notes
1	Irena Szewińska	Poland	50.48	Q OR
2	Ellen Streidt	East Germany	50.51	Q
3	Sheila Ingram	United States	50.90	Q
4	Riitta Salin	Finland	51.26	Q
5	Bethanie Nail	Australia	51.44	
6	Lyudmila Aksyonova	Soviet Union	51.55	
7	Christiane Wildschek	Austria	52.20	
—	Marita Koch	East Germany	DNS	

==== Heat 2 ====
Rank	Athlete	Nation	Time	Notes
1	Rosalyn Bryant	United States	50.62	Q
2	Christina Brehmer	East Germany	50.86	Q
3	Pirjo Häggman	Finland	51.03	Q
4	Debra Sapenter	United States	51.34	Q
5	Nadezhda Ilyina	Soviet Union	51.42	
6	Verna Burnard	Australia	51.71	
7	Rita Wilden	West Germany	51.82	
8	Nataliya Sokolova	Soviet Union	51.95	

=== Final ===
Rank	Athlete	Nation	Time	Notes
1st place, gold medalist(s)	Irena Szewińska	Poland	49.28	WR
2nd place, silver medalist(s)	Christina Brehmer	East Germany	50.51	
3rd place, bronze medalist(s)	Ellen Streidt	East Germany	50.55	
4	Pirjo Häggman	Finland	50.56	
5	Rosalyn Bryant	United States	50.65	
6	Sheila Ingram	United States	50.90	
7	Riitta Salin	Finland	50.98	
8	Debra Sapenter	United States	51.66	
