= 1974 European Athletics Championships – Women's 4 × 400 metres relay =

Women's 4 × 400 metres relay at the European Athletics Championships

The women's 4 × 400 metres relay at the 1974 European Athletics Championships was held in Rome, Italy, at Stadio Olimpico on 8 September 1974.

== Medalists ==
Gold	Brigitte Rohde; Waltraud Dietsch; Angelika Handt; Ellen Streidt; East Germany
Silver	Marika Eklund; Mona-Lisa Pursiainen; Pirjo Häggman; Riitta Salin; Finland
Bronze	Inta Kļimoviča; Ingrīda Barkāne; Nadezhda Ilyina; Natalya Sokolova; Soviet Union

== Results ==
=== Final ===
8 September

Rank	Nation	Competitors	Time	Notes
1st place, gold medalist(s)	East Germany	Brigitte Rohde; Waltraud Dietsch; Angelika Handt; Ellen Streidt	3:25.2	CR
2nd place, silver medalist(s)	Finland	Marika Eklund; Mona-Lisa Pursiainen; Pirjo Häggman; Riitta Salin	3:25.7	NR
3rd place, bronze medalist(s)	Soviet Union	Inta Kļimoviča; Ingrīda Barkāne; Nadezhda Ilyina; Natalya Sokolova	3:26.1	NR
4	Poland	Genowefa Błaszak; Krystyna Kacperczyk; Danuta Piecyk; Irena Szewińska	3:26.4	NR
5	West Germany	Dagmar Fuhrmann; Elke Barth; Hildegard Falck; Rita Wilden	3:27.9	
6	Great Britain	Ruth Kennedy; Jannette Roscoe; Verona Bernard; Donna Hartley	3:29.6	
7	Romania	Ibolya Slavic; Alexandra Badescu; Lăcrămioara Diaconiuc; Mariana Suman	3:30.8	NR
8	Czechoslovakia	Eva Štefková; Jindřiška Heřmanská; Eva Kovalčíková; Jozefína Čerchlanová	3:36.3	

== Participation ==
According to an unofficial count, 32 athletes from 8 countries participated in the event.

- Czechoslovakia (4)
- East Germany (4)
- Finland (4)
- Poland (4)
- Romania (4)
- Soviet Union (4)
- Great Britain (4)
- West Germany (4)
