= 1974 European Athletics Indoor Championships – Women's 400 metres =

The women's 400 metres event at the 1974 European Athletics Indoor Championships was held on 9 and 10 March in Gothenburg.

== Medalists ==
| Gold | Silver | Bronze |
|---|---|---|
| Jelica Pavličić; Yugoslavia | Nadezhda Ilyina; Soviet Union | Waltraud Dietsch; East Germany |

== Results ==
=== Heats ===
Held on 9 March.
First 2 from each heat (Q) and the next 2 fastest (q) qualified for the semifinals.

| Rank | Heat | Name | Nationality | Time | Notes |
|---|---|---|---|---|---|
| 1 | 2 | Nadezhda Ilyina | Soviet Union | 53.03 | Q, WB |
| 2 | 3 | Jelica Pavličić | Yugoslavia | 53.43 | Q |
| 3 | 2 | Angelika Handt | East Germany | 53.48 | Q |
| 4 | 3 | Brigitte Rohde | East Germany | 53.66 | Q |
| 5 | 1 | Waltraud Dietsch | East Germany | 54.12 | Q |
| 6 | 3 | Krystyna Kacperczyk | Poland | 54.17 | q |
| 7 | 2 | Ann Larsson | Sweden | 54.20 | q |
| 8 | 1 | Erika Weinstein | West Germany | 54.52 | Q |
| 9 | 1 | Riitta Salin | Finland | 54.76 | |
| 10 | 3 | Nicole Duclos | France | 54.83 | |
| 11 | 2 | Brigitte Koczelnik | West Germany | 55.09 | |
| 12 | 1 | Éliane Jacq | France | 55.27 | |

=== Semifinals ===
Held on 9 March.
First 2 from each heat (Q) qualified directly for the final.

| Rank | Heat | Name | Nationality | Time | Notes |
|---|---|---|---|---|---|
| 1 | 1 | Nadezhda Ilyina | Soviet Union | 52.44 | Q, WB |
| 2 | 1 | Waltraud Dietsch | East Germany | 52.77 | Q, NR |
| 3 | 1 | Brigitte Rohde | East Germany | 52.95 | |
| 4 | 2 | Jelica Pavličić | Yugoslavia | 53.00 | Q |
| 5 | 2 | Angelika Handt | East Germany | 53.05 | Q |
| 6 | 2 | Krystyna Kacperczyk | Poland | 53.56 | |
| 7 | 2 | Ann Larsson | Sweden | 54.00 | |
| 8 | 1 | Erika Weinstein | West Germany | 55.13 | |

=== Final ===
Held on 10 March.

| Rank | Name | Nationality | Time | Notes |
|---|---|---|---|---|
| 1st place, gold medalist(s) | Jelica Pavličić | Yugoslavia | 52.64 | NR |
| 2nd place, silver medalist(s) | Nadezhda Ilyina | Soviet Union | 52.81 | |
| 3rd place, bronze medalist(s) | Waltraud Dietsch | East Germany | 52.84 | |
| 4 | Angelika Handt | East Germany | 53.51 | |
