= Athletics at the 1974 British Commonwealth Games – Women's 200 metres =

Women's 200 metres at the 1974 British Commonwealth Games
- Venue: Queen Elizabeth II Park
- Dates: 27 and 29 January

Medalists
gold medal	Raelene Boyle	Australia
silver medal	Denise Robertson	Australia
bronze medal	Alice Annum	Ghana

The women's 200 metres event at the 1974 British Commonwealth Games was held on 27 and 29 January at the Queen Elizabeth II Park in Christchurch, New Zealand.

== Medallists ==
Medal winners
Gold	Silver	Bronze
Raelene Boyle; Australia	Denise Robertson; Australia	Alice Annum; Ghana

== Results ==
=== Heats ===
Held on 27 January

==== Qualification for semifinal ====
The first 3 in each heat (Q) and the next 1 fastest (q) qualified for the semifinals.

==== Wind speed ====
Heat 1: +2.3 m/s, Heat 2: +0.9 m/s, Heat 3: +0.1 m/s, Heat 4: +1.9 m/s, Heat 5: +0.1 m/s

Results of heats
Rank	Heat	Name	Nationality	Time	Notes
1	1	Donna Murray	England	24.0	Q
2	1	Rose Asiedua	Ghana	24.4	Q
3	1	Debbie Jones	Bermuda	24.7	Q
4	1	Linda McCurry	Northern Ireland	24.71	
5	1	Rose Mfunya	Tanzania	25.72	
6	1	Janet Manda	Malawi	26.19	
7	1	Uafu Tuineau	Tonga	26.91	
	1	Rose Allwood	Jamaica	DNF	
1	2	Robyn Boak	Australia	23.58	Q
2	2	Wendy Hill	England	24.0	Q
3	2	Marcia Trotman	Barbados	24.2	Q
4	2	Margaret MacGowan	Canada	24.37	
5	2	Kim Robertson	New Zealand	24.56	
6	2	Nzaeli Kyomo	Tanzania	25.20	
7	2	Keta Iongi	Tonga	25.67	
1	3	Raelene Boyle	Australia	23.14	Q
2	3	Alice Annum	Ghana	23.4	Q
3	3	Wendy Brown	New Zealand	23.8	Q
4	3	Lorna Forde	Barbados	23.8	q
5	3	Alison MacRitchie	Scotland	24.42	
6	3	Avril McClelland	Northern Ireland	25.14	
	3	Eleanor Phillips	Fiji	DNS	
1	4	Denise Robertson	Australia	23.14	Q
2	4	Patty Loverock	Canada	23.6	Q
3	4	Ruth Williams	Jamaica	23.7	Q
4	4	Hannah Afriye	Ghana	24.13	
5	4	Barbara Martin	England	24.23	
6	4	Beatrice Ewuzie	Nigeria	24.44	
7	4	Torika Cavuka	Fiji	26.37	
1	5	Marjorie Bailey	Canada	23.5	Q
2	5	Helen Golden	Scotland	23.9	Q
3	5	Gail Wooten	New Zealand	24.0	Q
4	5	Ashanti Obi	Nigeria	24.72	
5	5	Christine Byobona	Uganda	24.72	
6	5	Mary Machoba	Lesotho	27.07	
	5	Miriama Tuisorisori	Fiji	DNS	

=== Semifinals ===
Held on 27 January

==== Qualification for final ====
The first 4 in each semifinal (Q) qualified directly for the final.

==== Wind speed ====
Heat 1: +0.2 m/s, Heat 2: +0.4 m/s

Semifinal results
Rank	Heat	Name	Nationality	Time	Notes
1	1	Denise Robertson	Australia	23.22	Q
2	1	Marjorie Bailey	Canada	23.7	Q
3	1	Wendy Brown	New Zealand	23.8	Q
4	1	Ruth Williams	Jamaica	23.9	Q
5	1	Helen Golden	Scotland	23.93	
6	1	Wendy Hill	England	24.13	
7	1	Lorna Forde	Barbados	24.15	
8	1	Rose Asiedua	Ghana	24.77	
1	2	Alice Annum	Ghana	23.2	Q
2	2	Raelene Boyle	Australia	23.30	Q
3	2	Robyn Boak	Australia	23.51	Q
4	2	Patty Loverock	Canada	23.6	Q
5	2	Gail Wooten	New Zealand	24.01	
6	2	Donna Murray	England	24.17	
7	2	Marcia Trotman	Barbados	24.42	
8	2	Debbie Jones	Bermuda	24.74	

=== Final ===
Held on 29 January

==== Wind speed ====
+0.6 m/s

Final result
Rank	Lane	Name	Nationality	Time	Notes
1st place, gold medalist(s)	6	Raelene Boyle	Australia	22.50	GR
2nd place, silver medalist(s)	4	Denise Robertson	Australia	22.73	
3rd place, bronze medalist(s)	7	Alice Annum	Ghana	22.90	
4	2	Marjorie Bailey	Canada	23.13	
5	3	Ruth Williams	Jamaica	23.39	
6	5	Wendy Brown	New Zealand	23.44	
7	1	Robyn Boak	Australia	23.45	
8	8	Patty Loverock	Canada	23.76	
