= 1976 USA Outdoor Track and Field Championships =

- Dates: June 10–12
- Host city: Westwood, California, United States
- Venue: Drake Stadium University of California, Los Angeles

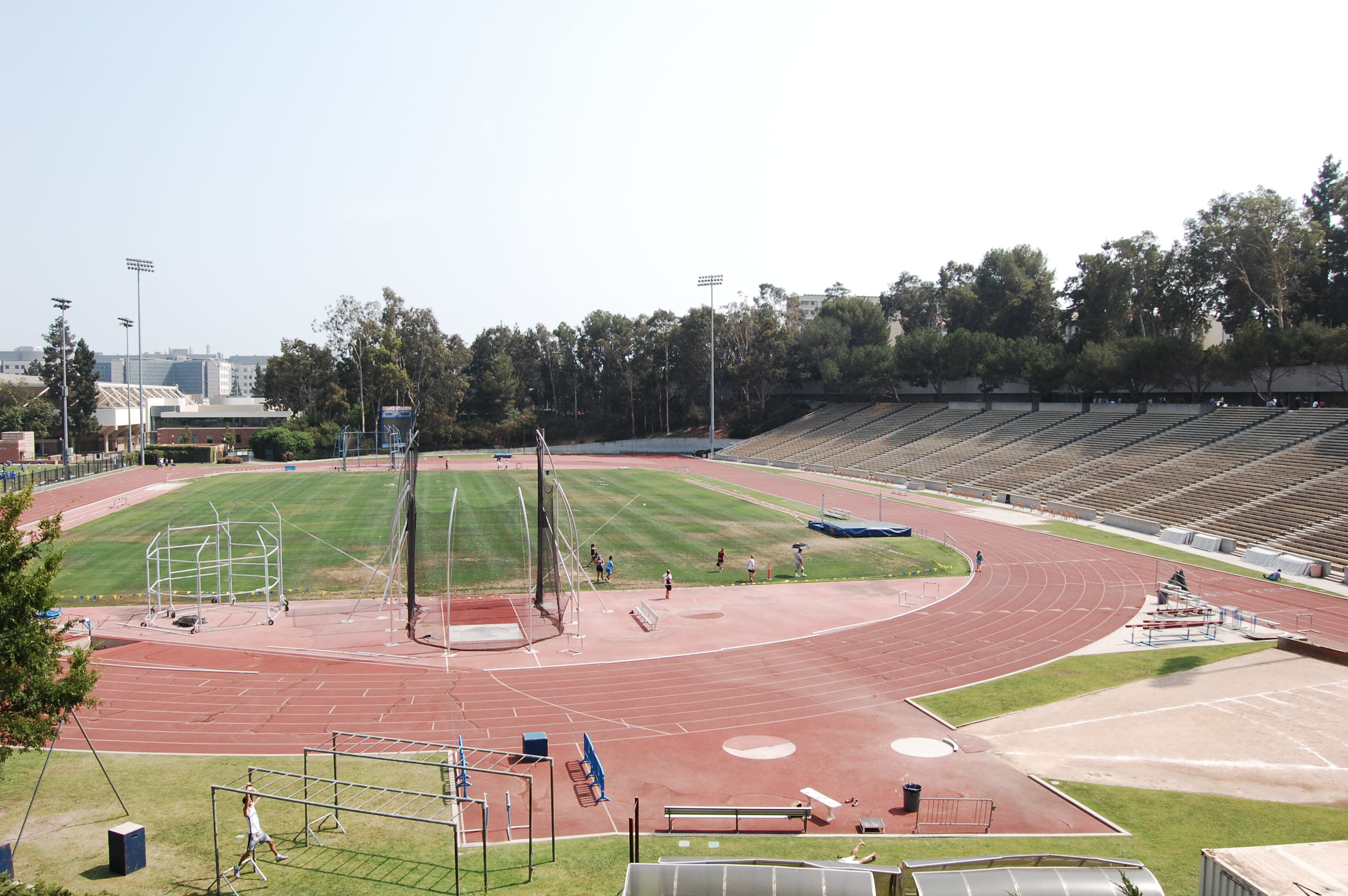
Drake Stadium

The 1976 USA Outdoor Track and Field Championships took place between June 10–12 at Drake Stadium on the campus of University of California, Los Angeles in Westwood, California. The decathlon took place on June 25–26 at Hayward Field in Eugene, Oregon as part of the 1976 Olympic Trials where Bruce Jenner improved his own world record. This meet was organized by the AAU. It was the first such meet, a precedent that has been followed subsequently, where the women's division competed at the same venue concurrently with the men.

== Results ==
=== Men track events ===
Event	Gold		Silver		Bronze	
100 meters	Christer Garpenborg; Sweden; Guy Abrahams; Panama; Mike Sands; Bahamas; Robert Woods	10.39 10.41 10.43 10.44	Larry Jackson	10.45	Robert E. Taylor	10.47
200 meters	Millard Hampton	20.89	James Gilkes; Guyana; Larry Jackson	20.95 21.05	Clancy Edwards	21.05
400 meters	Maxie Parks	44.82 CR	Robert E. Taylor	45.11	Fred Newhouse	45.20
800 meters	James Robinson	1.46.63	Tom McLean	1.46.86	Rick Brown	1.47.25
1500 meters	Eamon Coghlan; Ireland; Michael Manke	3.42.41 3.42.70	Michael Durkin	3.42.82	Mark Schilling	3.42.95
5000 meters	Dick Buerkle	13.31.2	Martin Liquori	13.41.0	Paul Geis	13.43.8
10000 meters	Ed Leddy Ireland; Duncan Macdonald	28.46.0; 28.58.6	Dave Smith	29.09.8	Anthony Sandoval	29.14.0
Marathon (42.195 km.)	Gary Tuttle	2.15.15 CR	Benji Durden	2.20.25	Ronald Kurrie	2.21.38
110 meters hurdles	Thomas Hill	13.64	James Owens	13.69	Delario Robinson	13.76
400 meters hurdles	Tom Andrews	48.55 CR	Jim Bolding	48.57	Ralph Mann	48.77
3000 meters steeplechase	Randy Smith	8.26.71	Douglas Brown	8.33.48	Mike Roche	8.35.07
5000 meters race walk	Ron Laird	21:09.4	Todd Scully	21:15.4	Larry Walker	21:32.8

=== Men field events ===
Event	Gold		Silver		Bronze	
High jump	Dwight Stones	2.24 m (7 ft 4 in)	Melvin Embree	2.18 m (7 ft 1 3/4 in)	Reynaldo Brown	2.18 m (7 ft 1 3/4 in)
Pole vault	Earl Bell	5.44 m (17 ft 10 in)	Mike Tully	5.44 m (17 ft 10 in)	Don Baird; Australia; Terry Porter	5.44 m (17 ft 10 in) 5.33 m (17 ft 5 3/4 in)
Long jump	Arnie Robinson	8.32 m (27 ft 3 1/2 in)	James (Bouncy) Moore	8.05 m (26 ft 4 3/4 in)	Danny Seay	7.89 m (25 ft 10 1/2 in)
Triple jump	Tommy Haynes	17.01 m (55 ft 9 1/2 in)w	James Butts	16.95 m (55 ft 7 1/4 in)w	Willie Banks	16.77 m (55 ft 0 in)w
Shot put	Terry Albritton	21.15 m (69 ft 4 1/2 in)	Al Feuerbach	21.09 m (69 ft 2 1/4 in)	George Woods	20.99 m (68 ft 10 1/4 in)
Discus throw	Mac Wilkins	70.10 m (229 ft 11 in) CR	John Powell	67.54 m (221 ft 7 in)	Jay Silvester	63.60 m (208 ft 7 in)
Hammer throw	Lawrence Hart	68.83 m (225 ft 9 in)	Bill Diehl	67.18 m (220 ft 4 in)	Bill Shuff	66.57 m (218 ft 4 in)
Javelin throw	Fred Luke	85.55 m (280 ft 8 in)	Richard George	83.84 m (275 ft 0 in)	Bill Schmidt	80.24 m (263 ft 3 in)
Pentathlon	Mike Conti	2988 pts				
All-around decathlon	Lloyd Sigler	7609 pts				
Decathlon	Bruce Jenner	8542w WR*	Fred Dixon	8294	Fred Samara	8004

=== Women track events ===
Event	Gold		Silver		Bronze	
100 meters	Chandra Cheeseborough	11.34	Rosalyn Bryant	11.43	Ranaye Bowen	11.49
200 meters	Brenda Morehead	22.94 = CR	Debra Armstrong	23.19	Rosalyn Bryant	23.40
400 meters	Lorna Forde	52.30	Sheila Ingram	52.52	Shirley Williams	52.53
800 meters	Madeline Manning	2.01.00	Kathy Weston	2.03.52	Janice Merrill	2.03.85
1500 meters	Francie Larrieu	4.09.93 CR	Cindy Bremser	4.10.8	Julie Brown	4.14.14
3000 meters	Janice Merrill	8.57.17	Teri Anderson	9.19.55	Peggy Neppel	9.22.65
Marathon Western Hemisphere Marathon, Culver City, California	Dorothy Doolittle	2.55.38	Sue Ellen Trapp	3.10.32	Peggy Kokevnot	3.25.46
100 meters hurdles	Jane Frederick	13.29	Debbie LaPlante	13.32	Sonya Hardy	13.50
400 meters hurdles	Arthurine Gainer	57.24 AR	Debbie Esser	57.56	Mary Ayers	58.53
5000 meters race walk	Sue Broddock	25:28.4	Laurie Tucholski	25:55.4	Susan Liers	26:29.8

=== Women field events ===
Event	Gold		Silver		Bronze	
High jump	Joni Huntley	1.88 m (6 ft 2 in) CR	Pam Spencer	1.84 m (6 ft 1/4 in)	Ann Gilliland	1.75 m (5 ft 8 3/4 in)
Long jump	Kathy McMillan	6.78 m (22 ft 2 3/4 in) AR	Sherron Walker	6.51 m (21 ft 4 1/4 in)	Martha Watson	6.39 m (20 ft 11 1/2 in)
Shot put	Maren Seidler	16.56 m (54 ft 3 3/4 in) CR	Kathy Devine	15.66 m (51 ft 4 1/2 in)	Marcia Mecklenburg	15.31 m (50 ft 2 3/4 in)
Discus throw	Lynne Winbigler	53.06 m (174 ft 0 in)	Jan Svendsen	51.76 m (169 ft 9 in)	Linda Langford	50.82 m (166 ft 8 in)
Javelin throw	Kathy Schmidt	66.52 m (218 ft 2 in) AR	Karin Smith	62.13 m (203 ft 10 in)	Sherry Calvert	58.04 m (190 ft 5 in)
Pentathlon	Jane Frederick	4622	Gale Fitzgerald	4417	Marilyn King	4374

== See also ==
- United States Olympic Trials (track and field)
