= Athletics at the 1975 Summer Universiade – Women's 400 metres =

The men's 400 metres event at the 1975 Summer Universiade was held at the Stadio Olimpico in Rome on 18 and 19 September.

== Medalists ==
Gold	Silver	Bronze
Pirjo Häggman; Finland	Inta Kļimoviča; Soviet Union	Jelica Pavličić; Yugoslavia

== Results ==
=== Heats ===
Rank	Heat	Athlete	Nationality	Time	Notes
1	1	Inta Kļimoviča	Soviet Union	52.80	Q
2	2	Rita Bottiglieri	Italy	53.31	Q
3	1	Pirjo Häggman	Finland	53.62	Q
4	2	Jelica Pavličić	Yugoslavia	53.79	Q
5	2	Christiane Casapicola	Austria	53.94	q
6	1	Paula Lloyd	Great Britain	54.17	q
7	3	Debra Sapenter	United States	54.39	Q
8	3	Larisa Golovanova	Soviet Union	54.57	Q
9	3	Margaret McGowen	Canada	54.82	
10	2	Martine Duvivier	France	55.57	
11	3	Jackie Stokoe	Great Britain	56.15	
12	3	Paola Bolognesi	Italy	56.28	
13	3	Maria da Silva	Brazil	56.72	
14	2	Valdéa Chagas	Brazil	56.73	
15	1	Silvia Hormazabal	Chile	57.87	

=== Final ===
Rank	Athlete	Nationality	Time	Notes
1st place, gold medalist(s)	Pirjo Häggman	Finland	51.80	UR
2nd place, silver medalist(s)	Inta Kļimoviča	Soviet Union	52.25	
3rd place, bronze medalist(s)	Jelica Pavličić	Yugoslavia	52.50	
4	Rita Bottiglieri	Italy	52.58	
5	Christiane Casapicola	Austria	53.57	
6	Paula Lloyd	Great Britain	53.98	
7	Larisa Golovanova	Soviet Union	54.56	
8	Debra Sapenter	United States	54.89	
