= 1975 European Athletics Indoor Championships – Women's 400 metres =

The women's 400 metres event at the 1975 European Athletics Indoor Championships was held on 8 and 9 March in Katowice.

== Medalists ==
Gold	Silver	Bronze
Verona Bernard-Elder; Great Britain	Nadezhda Ilyina; Soviet Union	Inta Klimovica; Soviet Union

== Results ==
=== Heats ===
Held on 8 March.
The winner of each heat (Q) and the next 2 fastest (q) qualified for the final.

Rank	Heat	Name	Nationality	Time	Notes
1	1	Verona Bernard-Elder	Great Britain	53.99	Q
2	1	Lyudmila Aksyonova	Soviet Union	54.19	q
3	2	Nadezhda Ilyina	Soviet Union	54.29	Q
4	2	Inta Kļimoviča	Soviet Union	54.48	q
5	1	Danuta Piecyk	Poland	55.55	
	2	Yordanka Filipova	Bulgaria	DNF	

=== Final ===
Held on 9 March.

Rank	Name	Nationality	Time	Notes
1st place, gold medalist(s)	Verona Bernard-Elder	Great Britain	52.68	
2nd place, silver medalist(s)	Nadezhda Ilyina	Soviet Union	53.21	
3rd place, bronze medalist(s)	Inta Kļimoviča	Soviet Union	53.91	
4	Lyudmila Aksyonova	Soviet Union	54.01	
