= Athletics at the 1976 Summer Olympics =

Athletics at the Games of the XXI Olympiad
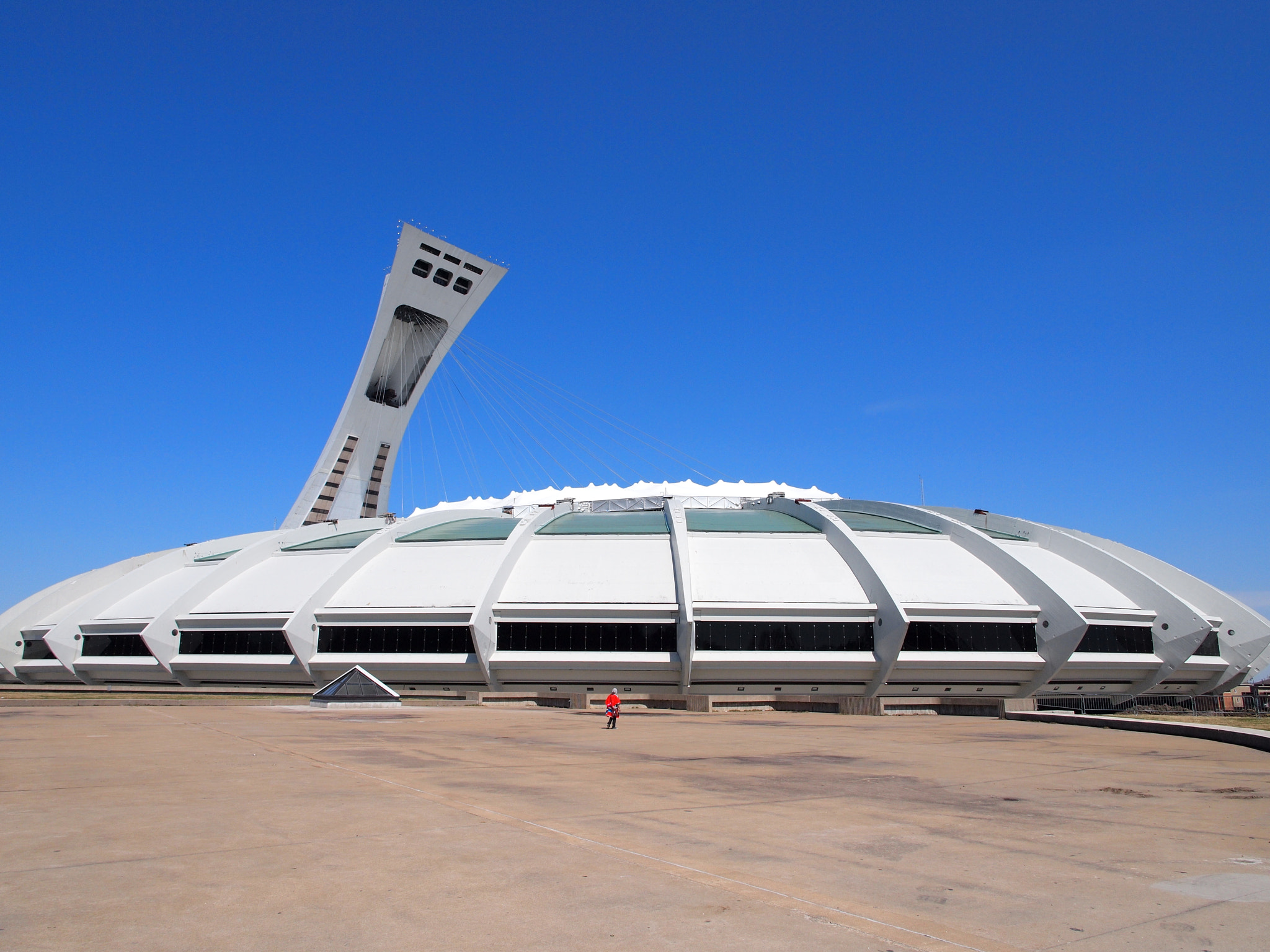
- Host stadium (shown in 2012)
- No. of events: 37
- Competitors: 1,005 from 80 nations

At the 1976 Summer Olympics in Montreal, 37 events were contested in athletics. There were a total number of 1005 participating athletes from 80 countries.

The men's 50 kilometres walk competition was dropped from the Olympic athletics programme, despite its constant presence at the games since 1932. The IAAF chose to host its own world championship event instead, a month and a half after the Olympics. This foreshadowed the creation of the IAAF World Championships in Athletics in the following years.

== Medal summary ==
=== Men ===
Event	Gold		Silver		Bronze	
100 metres	Hasely Crawford; Trinidad and Tobago	10.06	Don Quarrie; Jamaica	10.08	Valeriy Borzov; Soviet Union	10.14
200 metres	Don Quarrie; Jamaica	20.23	Millard Hampton; United States	20.29	Dwayne Evans; United States	20.43
400 metres	Alberto Juantorena; Cuba	44.26	Fred Newhouse; United States	44.40	Herman Frazier; United States	44.95
800 metres	Alberto Juantorena; Cuba	1:43.50 WR	Ivo Van Damme; Belgium	1:43.86	Rick Wohlhuter; United States	1:44.12
1500 metres	John Walker; New Zealand	3:39.17	Ivo Van Damme; Belgium	3:39.27	Paul-Heinz Wellmann; West Germany	3:39.33
5000 metres	Lasse Virén; Finland	13:24.76	Dick Quax; New Zealand	13:25.16	Klaus-Peter Hildenbrand; West Germany	13:25.38
10,000 metres	Lasse Virén; Finland	27:40.38	Carlos Lopes; Portugal	27:45:17	Brendan Foster; Great Britain	27:54.92
110 metres hurdles	Guy Drut; France	13.30	Alejandro Casañas; Cuba	13.33	Willie Davenport; United States	13.38
400 metres hurdles	Edwin Moses; United States	47.64 WR	Michael Shine; United States	48.69	Yevgeniy Gavrilenko; Soviet Union	49.45
3000 metres steeplechase	Anders Gärderud; Sweden	8:08.02 WR	Bronisław Malinowski; Poland	8:09.11	Frank Baumgartl; East Germany	8:10.36
4 × 100 metres relay	United States; Harvey Glance; Johnny Jones; Millard Hampton; Steve Riddick	38.33	East Germany; Manfred Kokot; Jörg Pfeifer; Klaus-Dieter Kurrat; Alexander Thieme	38.66	Soviet Union; Aleksandr Aksinin; Nikolay Kolesnikov; Juris Silovs; Valeriy Borzov	38.78
4 × 400 metres relay	United States; Herman Frazier; Benny Brown; Fred Newhouse; Maxie Parks	2:58.65	Poland; Ryszard Podlas; Jan Werner; Zbigniew Jaremski; Jerzy Pietrzyk	3:01.43	West Germany; Franz-Peter Hofmeister; Lothar Krieg; Harald Schmid; Bernd Herrmann	3:01.98
Marathon	Waldemar Cierpinski; East Germany	2:09:55.0 OR	Frank Shorter; United States	2:10:45.8	Karel Lismont; Belgium	2:11:12.6
20 kilometres walk	Daniel Bautista; Mexico	1:24:40.6 OR	Hans-Georg Reimann; East Germany	1:25:13.6	Peter Frenkel; East Germany	1:25:29.4
High jump	Jacek Wszoła; Poland	2.25 m OR	Greg Joy; Canada	2.23 m	Dwight Stones; United States	2.21 m
Pole vault	Tadeusz Ślusarski; Poland	5.50 m	Antti Kalliomäki; Finland	5.50 m	David Roberts; United States	5.50 m
Long jump	Arnie Robinson; United States	8.35 m	Randy Williams; United States	8.11 m	Frank Wartenberg; East Germany	8.02 m
Triple jump	Viktor Saneyev; Soviet Union	17.29 m	James Butts; United States	17.18 m	João Carlos de Oliveira; Brazil	16.90 m
Shot put	Udo Beyer; East Germany	21.05 m	Yevgeny Mironov; Soviet Union	21.03 m	Aleksandr Baryshnikov; Soviet Union	21.00 m
Discus throw	Mac Wilkins; United States	67.50 m	Wolfgang Schmidt; East Germany	66.22 m	John Powell; United States	65.70 m
Hammer throw	Yuriy Sedykh; Soviet Union	77.52 m OR	Aleksey Spiridonov; Soviet Union	76.08 m	Anatoliy Bondarchuk; Soviet Union	75.48 m
Javelin throw	Miklós Németh; Hungary	94.58 WR	Hannu Siitonen; Finland	87.92	Gheorghe Megelea; Romania	87.16 m
Decathlon	Bruce Jenner (Note: Jenner underwent gender transition in 2015.); United States	8618 WR	Guido Kratschmer; West Germany	8411	Mykola Avilov; Soviet Union	8369

=== Women ===
Games	Gold		Silver		Bronze	
100 metres	Annegret Richter; West Germany	11.08	Renate Stecher; East Germany	11.13	Inge Helten; West Germany	11.17
200 metres	Bärbel Eckert; East Germany	22.37 OR	Annegret Richter; West Germany	22.39	Renate Stecher; East Germany	22.47
400 metres	Irena Szewińska; Poland	49.28 WR	Christina Brehmer; East Germany	50.51	Ellen Streidt; East Germany	50.55
800 metres	Tatyana Kazankina; Soviet Union	1:54.94 WR	Nikolina Shtereva; Bulgaria	1:55.42	Elfi Zinn; East Germany	1:55.60
1500 metres	Tatyana Kazankina; Soviet Union	4:05.48	Gunhild Hoffmeister; East Germany	4:06.02	Ulrike Klapezynski; East Germany	4:06.09
100 metres hurdles	Johanna Schaller; East Germany	12.77	Tatyana Anisimova; Soviet Union	12.78	Natalya Lebedeva; Soviet Union	12.80
4 × 100 metres relay	East Germany; Marlies Oelsner; Renate Stecher; Carla Bodendorf; Bärbel Eckert	42.55 OR	West Germany; Elvira Possekel; Inge Helten; Annegret Richter; Annegret Kroniger	42.59	Soviet Union; Tatyana Prorochenko; Lyudmila Maslakova; Nadezhda Besfamilnaya; Vera Anisimova	43.09
4 × 400 metres relay	East Germany; Doris Maletzki; Brigitte Rohde; Ellen Streidt; Christina Brehmer	3:19.23 WR	United States; Debra Sapenter; Sheila Ingram; Pamela Jiles; Rosalyn Bryant	3:22.81	Soviet Union; Inta Kļimoviča; Lyudmila Aksyonova; Natalya Sokolova; Nadezhda Ilyina	3:24.24
High jump	Rosemarie Ackermann; East Germany	1.93 m OR	Sara Simeoni; Italy	1.91 m	Yordanka Blagoeva; Bulgaria	1.91 m
Long jump	Angela Voigt; East Germany	6.72 m	Kathy McMillan; United States	6.66 m	Lidiya Alfeyeva; Soviet Union	6.60 m
Shot put	Ivanka Khristova; Bulgaria	21.16 m OR	Nadezhda Chizhova; Soviet Union	20.96 m	Helena Fibingerová; Czechoslovakia	20.67 m
Discus throw	Evelin Schlaak; East Germany	69.00 m OR	Mariya Vergova; Bulgaria	67.30 m	Gabriele Hinzmann; East Germany	66.84 m
Javelin throw	Ruth Fuchs; East Germany	65.94 m OR	Marion Becker; West Germany	64.70 m	Kate Schmidt; United States	63.96 m
Pentathlon	Siegrun Siegl; East Germany	4745	Christine Laser; East Germany	4745	Burglinde Pollak; East Germany	4740

== Medal table ==
Rank	Nation	Gold	Silver	Bronze	Total
1	East Germany	11	7	9	27
2	United States	6	8	8	22
3	Soviet Union	4	4	10	18
4	Poland	3	2	0	5
5	Finland	2	2	0	4
6	Cuba	2	1	0	3
7	West Germany	1	4	4	9
8	Bulgaria	1	2	1	4
9	Jamaica	1	1	0	2
9	New Zealand	1	1	0	2
11	France	1	0	0	1
11	Hungary	1	0	0	1
11	Mexico	1	0	0	1
11	Sweden	1	0	0	1
11	Trinidad and Tobago	1	0	0	1
16	Belgium	0	2	1	3
17	Canada	0	1	0	1
17	Italy	0	1	0	1
17	Portugal	0	1	0	1
20	Brazil	0	0	1	1
20	Czechoslovakia	0	0	1	1
20	Great Britain	0	0	1	1
20	Romania	0	0	1	1
Totals (23 entries)		37	37	37	111
