= Athletics at the 1975 Pan American Games – Women's 4 × 400 metres relay =

Women's 4 × 400 metres relay at the Pan American Games

The women's 4 × 400 metres relay event at the 1975 Pan American Games was held in Mexico City on 20 October.

== Results ==
Rank	Nation	Athletes	Time	Notes
1st place, gold medalist(s)	Canada	Margaret McGowen, Joanne McTaggart, Rachelle Campbell, Joyce Yakubowich	3:30.36	GR
2nd place, silver medalist(s)	United States	Sharon Dabney, Pat Helms, Debra Sapenter, Kathy Weston	3:30.64	
3rd place, bronze medalist(s)	Cuba	Eia Cabreja, Rosa López, Asunción Acosta, Aurelia Pentón	3:31.65	
4	Jamaica	Ruth Williams-Simpson, Carol Cummings, Debbie Byfield-White, Helen Blake	3:32.38	
