= Athletics at the 1977 Summer Universiade – Women's 400 metres =

The women's 400 metres event at the 1977 Summer Universiade was held at the Vasil Levski National Stadium in Sofia on 20 and 21 August.

== Medalists ==
| Gold | Silver | Bronze |
|---|---|---|
| Rosalyn Bryant; United States | Natalya Sokolova; Soviet Union | Beatriz Castillo; Cuba |

== Results ==
=== Heats ===
| Rank | Heat | Athlete | Nationality | Time | Notes |
|---|---|---|---|---|---|
| 1 | 2 | Natalya Sokolova | Soviet Union | 51.84 | Q |
| 2 | 1 | Rosalyn Bryant | United States | 52.29 | Q |
| 3 | 1 | Beatriz Castillo | Cuba | 53.17 | Q |
| 4 | 2 | Lacramioara Diaconiuc | Romania | 53.31 | Q |
| 5 | 2 | Barbara Kwietniewska | Poland | 53.43 | q |
| 6 | 3 | Marie-Christine Champenois | France | 53.52 | Q |
| 7 | 1 | Ruth Kennedy | Great Britain | 53.76 | q |
| 8 | 2 | Ilona Pál | Hungary | 53.90 | |
| 9 | 3 | Margaret Stride | Canada | 54.32 | Q |
| 10 | 1 | Andrea Mühlbach | Austria | 54.35 | |
| 11 | 2 | Violeta Tsvetkova | Bulgaria | 54.59 | |
| 12 | 2 | Paula Lloyd | Great Britain | 54.98 | |
| 13 | 3 | Atlanka Odadzhieva | Bulgaria | 55.13 | |
| 14 | 1 | Vilma Paris | Puerto Rico | 55.53 | |
| 15 | 3 | Regine Westedt | West Germany | 56.26 | |
| 16 | 3 | Marie Lande Mathieu | Puerto Rico | 56.70 | |
| 17 | 1 | Razia Sultana Anu | Bangladesh | 1:09.24 | |

=== Final ===
| Rank | Athlete | Nationality | Time | Notes |
|---|---|---|---|---|
| 1st place, gold medalist(s) | Rosalyn Bryant | United States | 52.10 | |
| 2nd place, silver medalist(s) | Natalya Sokolova | Soviet Union | 52.15 | |
| 3rd place, bronze medalist(s) | Beatriz Castillo | Cuba | 52.95 | |
| 4 | Marie-Christine Champenois | France | 53.33 | |
| 5 | Ruth Kennedy | Great Britain | 53.89 | |
| 6 | Margaret Stride | Canada | 53.96 | |
| 7 | Barbara Kwietniewska | Poland | 54.02 | |
| 8 | Lacramioara Diaconiuc | Romania | 54.44 | |
