= Yvonne Saunders =

Canadian athlete (born 1951)

Medal record

Women's Athletics

Representing Jamaica

Pan American Games
Bronze medal – third place	1971 Cali	400 metres
Bronze medal – third place	1971 Cali	4 × 400 metres

Representing Canada

British Commonwealth Games
Gold medal – first place	1974 Christchurch	400 metres
Bronze medal – third place	1974 Christchurch	4 × 400 metres

Yvonne Saunders-Mondesire (born 9 October 1951) is a Canadian former track and field athlete. A versatile athlete, she competed in women's pentathlon, long jump, high jump, 400 metres and 800 metres. She competed internationally for Canada, Jamaica, and England during her career.

She was a double medallist for Jamaica at the 1971 Pan American Games and was the 400 m champion at the 1974 British Commonwealth Games for Canada. She competed twice at the Summer Olympics: in 1972 for Jamaica and in 1976 for Canada.

== Early life and education ==
Born Yvonne Saunders in Jamaica, she emigrated with her family to England at the age of eight. Her talent for track and field was identified in her teens while she was at Gorse Park High School in Stretford, Greater Manchester. Competing in the high jump she won the intermediate category at the English Schools' Athletics Championships in 1966 and 1967. She began to expand her oeuvre of events and at the AAA Junior Championships she was the under-17 high jump winner in 1967, then took a high jump pentathlon double in 1968. She represented England at the British Schools International Match, winning high jump in 1967 and 1968. Her international duties brought her to Montreal in 1968 and the family decided to move there that same year.

== Career ==
She moved from Montreal to Milton, Ontario in 1970, and began training at Guelph Legion Track Club. Her talents came along with some unwanted attention and she later recounted: "I was also called racist names as I jogged in the city and white parents approached me at meetings pleading that I should allow their daughters to win". The eighteen-year-old Saunders soon made an impact at the Canadian Track and Field Championships by winning a national title double in the high jump and 400 metres. Entering senior competition, she decided to represent her country of birth and in her major debut she placed eighth in the pentathlon at the 1970 British Commonwealth Games. She also helped the Jamaican women's 4 × 100 metres relay team to fifth in the rankings.

At the 1971 Central American and Caribbean Championships in Athletics she won three medals, being individual bronze medallist in the 400 m and long jump and a gold medallist with the 4 × 400 metres relay team. Further accolades followed at the Pan American Games later that year, where she took bronze medals in the individual and relay 400 m events. She was also fifth in the long jump, clearing six metres. Her Olympic debut came in 1972 at the Munich Games. She was a semi-finalist in the 400 m and ran in the heats with the relay team including Ruth Williams, Una Morris and Rosie Allwood.

Saunders qualified for Canadian citizenship in 1972 and began to compete for her adopted home from 1973 onwards. It was in this period that her career hit its peak. A third Canadian national title followed at the 1973 Canadian Championships. She was chosen to run both the individual and relay sprint events for Canada at the 1974 British Commonwealth Games in January and delivered a Canadian record of 51.67 seconds to win the gold medal. She remains the only Canadian woman to have won that title and her run proved to be a lifetime best. She won a second medal with her teammates in the relay, sharing the bronze medals alongside Brenda Walsh, Margaret McGowen and Maureen Crowley. Later that year she set a world indoor best for the 600 metres distance (at 1:18.4 minutes) and she had a 400 m win at the WAAA Championships, setting a championship record of 51.90 seconds in the process of winning the event at the 1974 WAAA Championships.

Injuries affected Saunders in the subsequent two years, starting with a herniated back in 1975, then a knee injury. She had a successful appeal to the International Olympic Committee to speed up her citizenship and eligibility to compete at the 1976 Summer Olympics for Canada. With her training interrupted, she was off her 1974 best at the competition. She was eliminated in the first round of the 800 metres and placed a distant eighth in the relay final, running with Margaret Stride, Joyce Yakubowich, and Rachelle Campbell. This proved to be the last global event that she would appear at.

Saunders' form declined after 1976, though she remained in competition. Her last major tournament was the Liberty Bell Classic – held due to the 1980 Olympic boycott – where she was the best of the Western-aligned nations, beating American Robin Campbell and Ann Mackie-Morelli of Canada. She retired from the sport in 1982, having become increasingly disillusioned with the greater role that money and performance-enhancing drugs were having in the sport. She married Dr. Roy Mondesire, a scientist, and the couple had two children. Her younger brother Mark Saunders (police officer) became Chief of the Toronto Police Service in 2015. She was inducted into Athletics Ontario Hall of Fame in 2014 and lives in Boulder, Colorado.

== Personal bests ==
- 400 metres – 51.67 seconds (1974)
- 800 metres – 2:00.1 minutes (1975)

== International competitions ==
Year	Competition	Venue	Position	Event	Notes
1970	British Commonwealth Games	Edinburgh, Scotland	8th	Pentathlon	4441 pts
1970	British Commonwealth Games	Edinburgh, Scotland	5th	4 × 100 m relay	45.5
1971	CAC Championships	Kingston, Jamaica	3rd	400 m	54.3
1971	CAC Championships	Kingston, Jamaica	3rd	Long jump	5.65 m
1971	CAC Championships	Kingston, Jamaica	2nd	4 × 400 m relay	3:41.0
1971	Pan American Games	Cali, Colombia	3rd	400 m	53.13
1971	Pan American Games	Cali, Colombia	5th	Long jump	6.01 m
1971	Pan American Games	Cali, Colombia	3rd	4 × 400 m relay	3:34.05
1972	Olympic Games	Munich, West Germany	5th (semis)	400 m	51.93
1972	Olympic Games	Munich, West Germany	5th (heats)	4 × 400 m relay	3:31.89
1974	British Commonwealth Games	Christchurch, New Zealand	1st	400 m	51.67
1974	British Commonwealth Games	Christchurch, New Zealand	3rd	4 × 400 m relay	3:33.92
1976	Olympic Games	Montreal, Canada	4th (heats)	800 m	2:03.54
1976	Olympic Games	Montreal, Canada	8th	4 × 400 m relay	3:28.91
1980	Liberty Bell Classic	Philadelphia, United States	1st	800 m	2:02.34

== National titles ==
- Canadian Track and Field Championships
  - 400 metres: 1970, 1973
  - Long jump: 1970
