= Athletics at the 1975 Pan American Games – Women's 400 metres =

Women's 400 metres at the Pan American Games

The women's 400 metres event at the 1975 Pan American Games was held in Mexico City on 17 and 18 October.

== Medalists ==
Gold	Silver	Bronze
Joyce Yakubowich; Canada	Debra Sapenter; United States	Lorna Forde; Barbados

== Results ==
=== Heats ===
Rank	Heat	Name	Nationality	Time	Notes
1	3	Lorna Forde	Barbados	52.77	Q
2	3	Helen Blake	Jamaica	53.06	Q
3	1	Debra Sapenter	United States	53.18	Q
4	2	Sharon Dabney	United States	53.19	Q
5	2	Joyce Yakubowich	Canada	53.21	Q
6	1	Margaret McGowen	Canada	53.26	Q
7	3	Eia Cabreja	Cuba	53.30	q
8	1	Debbie Byfield-White	Jamaica	54.26	q
9	1	Alejandra Ramos	Chile	56.06	
10	3	Zonia Meigham	Guatemala	56.23	
11	2	June Smith	Trinidad and Tobago	56.31	
12	2	Margarita Grun	Uruguay	56.55	
13	2	Freida Davey	Barbados	56.66	
14	3	Ruth Alexander	Trinidad and Tobago	56.71	
15	1	Araceli Arana	Mexico	56.75	
16	2	Rose-Marie Gauthier	Haiti	1:06.60	

=== Final ===
Rank	Name	Nationality	Time	Notes
1st place, gold medalist(s)	Joyce Yakubowich	Canada	51.62	GR
2nd place, silver medalist(s)	Debra Sapenter	United States	52.22	
3rd place, bronze medalist(s)	Lorna Forde	Barbados	52.36	
4	Helen Blake	Jamaica	52.43	
5	Sharon Dabney	United States	52.68	
6	Margaret McGowen	Canada	53.11	
7	Debbie Byfield-White	Jamaica	54.19	
8	Eia Cabreja	Cuba	54.40	
