= 1973 European Athletics Indoor Championships – Women's 400 metres =

The women's 400 metres event at the 1973 European Athletics Indoor Championships was held on 10 and 11 March in Rotterdam.

== Medalists ==
Gold	Silver	Bronze
Verona Bernard; Great Britain	Waltraud Dietsch; East Germany	Renate Siebach; East Germany

== Results ==
=== Heats ===
Held on 10 March.

First 2 from each heat (Q) qualified directly for the semifinals.

Rank	Heat	Name	Nationality	Time	Notes
1	1	Verona Bernard	Great Britain	53.98	Q
2	1	Renate Siebach	East Germany	54.30	Q
2	2	Christel Frese	West Germany	54.30	Q
4	1	Karoline Käfer	Austria	54.31	NR
5	2	Lilyana Todorova	Bulgaria	54.56	Q
6	1	Chantal Leclerc	France	54.69	
7	3	Erika Weinstein	West Germany	54.76	Q
8	4	Danuta Piecyk	Poland	55.14	Q
9	2	Nicole Duclos	France	55.17	
10	4	Waltraud Dietsch	East Germany	55.28	Q
11	3	Chantal Jouvhomme	France	55.65	Q
12	2	Lea Alaerts	Belgium	55.75	
13	4	Josefina Salgado	Spain	56.04	NR
14	3	Nina Zyuskova	Soviet Union	56.32	

=== Semifinals ===
Held on 11 March.

First 2 from each heat (Q) qualified directly for the final.

Rank	Heat	Name	Nationality	Time	Notes
1	1	Verona Bernard	Great Britain	53.35	Q
2	1	Waltraud Dietsch	East Germany	53.44	Q
3	1	Erika Weinstein	West Germany	54.23	
4	1	Lilyana Todorova	Bulgaria	54.26	
5	2	Renate Siebach	East Germany	54.52	Q
6	2	Christel Frese	West Germany	54.71	Q
7	2	Danuta Piecyk	Poland	54.87	
8	2	Chantal Jouvhomme	France	55.09	

=== Final ===
Held on 11 March.

Rank	Name	Nationality	Time	Notes
1st place, gold medalist(s)	Verona Bernard	Great Britain	53.04	WB
2nd place, silver medalist(s)	Waltraud Dietsch	East Germany	53.35	
3rd place, bronze medalist(s)	Renate Siebach	East Germany	53.49	
4	Christel Frese	West Germany	53.78	
