= 1975 European Athletics Indoor Championships – Women's 4 × 320 metres relay =

The men's 4 × 320 metres relay event at the 1975 European Athletics Indoor Championships was held on 9 March in Katowice. The athletes ran two laps for each leg, like in modern indoor relay races, but because the track was only 160 metres long, it resulted in an unusual distance of 320 metres for each runner.

== Results ==
Rank	Nation	Competitors	Time	Notes
1st place, gold medalist(s)	Soviet Union	Inta Kļimoviča; Ingrida Barkane; Lyudmila Aksyonova; Nadezhda Ilyina	2:46.1	
2nd place, silver medalist(s)	West Germany	Elke Barth; Brigitte Koczelnik; Silvia Hollmann; Rita Wilden	2:47.3	
3rd place, bronze medalist(s)	Poland	Zofia Zwolińska; Genowefa Nowaczyk; Krystyna Kacperczyk; Danuta Piecyk	2:49.6	
4	Bulgaria	Galina Encheva; Maria Sabeva; Biserka Palazova; Yordanka Filipova	2:56.4	
