= Athletics at the 1979 Pan American Games – Women's 400 metres =

Women's 400 metres at the 1979 Pan American Games
- Venue: Estadio Sixto Escobar
- Dates: 11 & 12 July
- Winning time: 51.81

Medalists
Gold medal	Sharon Dabney	United States
Silver medal	June Griffith	Guyana
Bronze medal	Patricia Jackson	United States

The women's 400 metres sprint competition of the athletics events at the 1979 Pan American Games took place at the Estadio Sixto Escobar. The defending Pan American Games champion was Joyce Yakubowich of Canada.

== Records ==
Prior to this competition, the existing world and Pan American Games records were as follows:

World record	Marita Koch (GDR)	48.94	Prague, Czechoslovakia	August 31, 1978
Pan American Games record	Joyce Yakubowich (CAN)	51.62	Mexico City, Mexico	1975

== Results ==
All times shown are in seconds.

KEY:	WR	World Record	GR	Pan American Record

=== Heats ===
Rank	Heat	Name	Nationality	Time	Notes
1	1	June Griffith	Guyana	52.83	Q
2	2	Sharon Dabney	United States	52.91	Q
3	1	Patricia Jackson	United States	53.13	Q
4	2	Aurelia Pentón	Cuba	53.37	Q
5	2	Helen Blake	Jamaica	54.22	Q
6	2	Marita Payne	Canada	54.90	q
7	1	Micheline Racette	Canada	54.95	Q
8	1	Joece Felipe dos Santos	Brazil	56.39	q
9	1	Denise Muller	Virgin Islands	56.70	
10	2	Tânia Miranda	Brazil	57.12	
11	2	Marcela López	Argentina	57.65	
12	2	Brenda Gordon	Virgin Islands	1:00.69	
13	1	Eugenia Ponce	Honduras	1:04.14	

=== Final ===
Held on 12 July

Rank	Name	Nationality	Time	Notes
1st place, gold medalist(s)	Sharon Dabney	United States	51.81	
2nd place, silver medalist(s)	June Griffith	Guyana	51.81	
3rd place, bronze medalist(s)	Patricia Jackson	United States	52.32	
4	Aurelia Pentón	Cuba	52.71	
5	Micheline Racette	Canada	53.30	
6	Helen Blake	Jamaica	53.41	
7	Marita Payne	Canada	53.99	
8	Joece Felipe dos Santos	Brazil	56.49	
