= 1976 European Athletics Indoor Championships – Women's 400 metres =

The women's 400 metres event at the 1976 European Athletics Indoor Championships was held on 21 and 22 February in Munich.

== Medalists ==
Gold	Silver	Bronze
Rita Wilden; West Germany	Jelica Pavličić; Yugoslavia	Inta Kļimoviča; Soviet Union

== Results ==
=== Heats ===
First 2 from each heat (Q) and the next 2 fastest (q) qualified for the semifinals.

Rank	Heat	Name	Nationality	Time	Notes
1	3	Rita Wilden	West Germany	54.00	Q
2	3	Inta Kļimoviča	Soviet Union	54.09	Q
3	2	Jelica Pavličić	Yugoslavia	54.44	Q
4	1	Lyudmila Aksyonova	Soviet Union	54.53	Q
5	2	Dagmar Fuhrmann	West Germany	54.57	Q
6	2	Rosine Wallez	Belgium	54.61	q
7	1	Éva Tóth	Hungary	54.96	Q
8	2	Patricia Darbonville	France	55.69	q
9	1	Catherine Delachanal	France	55.71	
10	3	Helen Ritter	Liechtenstein	59.53	NR

=== Semifinals ===
First 2 from each heat (Q) qualified directly for the final.

Rank	Heat	Name	Nationality	Time	Notes
1	1	Jelica Pavličić	Yugoslavia	53.31	Q
2	1	Inta Kļimoviča	Soviet Union	53.31	Q
3	1	Dagmar Fuhrmann	West Germany	53.36	
4	1	Éva Tóth	Hungary	53.99	
5	2	Rita Wilden	West Germany	54.17	Q
6	2	Lyudmila Aksyonova	Soviet Union	54.37	Q
7	2	Rosine Wallez	Belgium	55.39	
8	2	Patricia Darbonville	France	57.30	

=== Final ===
Rank	Name	Nationality	Time	Notes
1st place, gold medalist(s)	Rita Wilden	West Germany	52.26	WR
2nd place, silver medalist(s)	Jelica Pavličić	Yugoslavia	52.47	NR
3rd place, bronze medalist(s)	Inta Kļimoviča	Soviet Union	52.80	NR
4	Lyudmila Aksyonova	Soviet Union	53.60	
