= Athletics at the 1971 Pan American Games – Women's 4 × 400 metres relay =

Women's 4 × 400 metres relay at the Pan American Games

The women's 4 × 400 metres relay at the 1971 Pan American Games was held in Cali on 5 August. It was the first time that the event was held at the Games.

== Results ==
Rank	Nation	Athletes	Time	Notes
1st place, gold medalist(s)	United States	Esther Stroy, Mavis Laing, Gwen Norman, Cheryl Toussaint	3:32.45	
2nd place, silver medalist(s)	Cuba	Beatriz Castillo, Marcela Chibás, Aurelia Pentón, Carmen Trustée	3:34.04	
3rd place, bronze medalist(s)	Jamaica	Beverly Franklin, Ruth Williams, Yvonne Saunders, Marilyn Neufville	3:34.05	
4	Canada	Brenda Walsh, Penny Werthner, Abigail Hoffman, Joyce Sadowick	3:41.23	
5	Colombia	Ana Maquillón, Juana Mosquera, Aida Ortiz, Elsy Rivas	3:50.43	
