= Athletics at the 1974 British Commonwealth Games – Women's 4 × 100 metres relay =

Women's 4 × 100 metres relay at the Commonwealth Games

The women's 4 × 100 metres relay event at the 1974 British Commonwealth Games was held on 31 January and 2 February at the Queen Elizabeth II Park in Christchurch, New Zealand.

== Medalists ==
Gold	Silver	Bronze
Australia; Denise Robertson; Jennifer Lamy; Raelene Boyle; Robyn Boak	England; Barbara Martin; Andrea Lynch; Judy Vernon; Sonia Lannaman	Ghana; Alice Annum; Hannah Afriyie; Josephine Ocran; Rose Asiedua

== Results ==
=== Heats ===
Qualification: First 3 teams of each heat (Q) plus the next 2 fastest (q) qualified for the final.

Rank	Heat	Nation	Athletes	Time	Notes
1	1	Australia	Denise Robertson, Jennifer Lamy, Raelene Boyle, Robyn Boak	44.6	Q
2	1	England	Barbara Martin, Andrea Lynch, Judy Vernon, Sonia Lannaman	44.9	Q
3	1	Canada	Elizabeth Damman, Lyn Kellond, Marjorie Bailey, Patty Loverock	44.9	Q
4	1	Scotland	Alison MacRitchie, Helen Golden, Myra Nimmo, Ruth Watt	46.5	q
5	1	Tanzania	Amira Mohamed, Nzaeli Kyomo, Philomena Chezi, Rose Mfunya	47.1	q
1	2	Ghana	Alice Annum, Hannah Afriyie, Josephine Ocran, Rose Asiedua	45.2	Q
2	2	New Zealand	Brenda Matthews, Gail Wooten, Kim Robertson, Wendy Brown	45.3	Q
3	2	Nigeria	Ashanti Obi, Beatrice Ewuzie, Etim Ufon-Uko, Modupe Oshikoya	45.8	Q
4	2	Fiji	Eleanor Phillips, Laisa Taga, Miriama Tuisorisori, Torika Cavuka	48.2	

=== Final ===
Rank	Nation	Athletes	Time	Notes
1st place, gold medalist(s)	Australia	Denise Robertson, Jennifer Lamy, Raelene Boyle, Robyn Boak	43.51	GR
2nd place, silver medalist(s)	England	Barbara Martin, Andrea Lynch, Judy Vernon, Sonia Lannaman	44.30	
3rd place, bronze medalist(s)	Ghana	Alice Annum, Hannah Afriyie, Josephine Ocran, Rose Asiedua	44.35	
4	Canada	Elizabeth Damman, Lyn Kellond, Marjorie Bailey, Patty Loverock	44.51	
5	New Zealand	Brenda Matthews, Gail Wooten, Kim Robertson, Wendy Brown	44.68	
6	Nigeria	Ashanti Obi, Beatrice Ewuzie, Etim Ufon-Uko, Modupe Oshikoya	45.22	
7	Scotland	Alison MacRitchie, Helen Golden, Myra Nimmo, Ruth Watt	46.22	
8	Tanzania	Amira Mohamed, Nzaeli Kyomo, Philomena Chezi, Rose Mfunya	46.43	
