= 1977 European Athletics Indoor Championships – Women's 400 metres =

The women's 400 metres event at the 1977 European Athletics Indoor Championships was held on 12 and 13 March in San Sebastián.

== Medalists ==
Gold	Silver	Bronze
Marita Koch; East Germany	Verona Elder; Great Britain	Jelica Pavličić; Yugoslavia

== Results ==
=== Heats ===
First 2 from each heat (Q) and the next 2 fastest (q) qualified for the final.

Rank	Heat	Name	Nationality	Time	Notes
1	2	Verona Elder	Great Britain	53.93	Q
2	2	Natalya Sokolova	Soviet Union	54.12	Q
3	1	Marita Koch	East Germany	54.42	Q
4	2	Rosa-María Colorado	Spain	54.45	q
5	1	Jelica Pavličić	Yugoslavia	54.52	Q
6	2	Jarmila Kratochvílová	Czechoslovakia	54.65	q
7	1	Elke Decker	West Germany	54.68	

=== Final ===
Rank	Name	Nationality	Time	Notes
1st place, gold medalist(s)	Marita Koch	East Germany	51.14	WR
2nd place, silver medalist(s)	Verona Elder	Great Britain	52.75	
3rd place, bronze medalist(s)	Jelica Pavličić	Yugoslavia	53.49	
4	Natalya Sokolova	Soviet Union	53.57	
5	Rosa-María Colorado	Spain	53.78	
6	Jarmila Kratochvílová	Czechoslovakia	53.95	
