= 1979 European Athletics Indoor Championships – Women's 400 metres =

The women's 400 metres event at the 1979 European Athletics Indoor Championships was held on 24 and 25 February in Vienna.

== Medalists ==
Gold	Silver	Bronze
Verona Elder; Great Britain	Jarmila Kratochvílová; Czechoslovakia	Karoline Käfer; Austria

== Results ==
=== Heats ===
First 2 from each heat (Q) qualified directly for the final.

Rank	Heat	Name	Nationality	Time	Notes
1	2	Jarmila Kratochvílová	Czechoslovakia	52.44	Q
2	2	Karoline Käfer	Austria	52.88	Q
3	1	Barbara Krug	East Germany	53.07	Q
4	1	Verona Elder	Great Britain	53.11	Q
5	2	Brigitte Köhn	East Germany	53.23	SB
6	1	Véronique Grandrieux	France	53.28	PB
7	1	Mariya Kulchunova	Soviet Union	53.49	SB
8	2	Barbro Ahonen-Lindström	Finland	54.19	PB

=== Final ===
Rank	Name	Nationality	Time	Notes
1st place, gold medalist(s)	Verona Elder	Great Britain	51.80	PB
2nd place, silver medalist(s)	Jarmila Kratochvílová	Czechoslovakia	51.81	SB
3rd place, bronze medalist(s)	Karoline Käfer	Austria	51.90	NR
4	Barbara Krug	East Germany	52.36	PB
