= Käfer =

Käfer may refer to:

- Volkswagen "beetle" (German: Käfer) models
  - Volkswagen Beetle
  - Volkswagen New Beetle
- Karoline Käfer (born 1954), Austrian athlete
