= Pamela Jiles =

Pamela Jiles may refer to

- Pamela Jiles (athlete) (born 1954), American athlete who competed at the 1976 Summer Olympics
- Pamela Jiles (journalist) (born 1960), Chilean journalist
