= Helen Blake =

Jamaican sprinter

Personal information
- Nickname: Pinky
- Nationality: Jamaican
- Born: 1 May 1951 (age 74) Saint Elizabeth, Jamaica
- Height: 1.70 m (5 ft 7 in)
- Weight: 52 kg (115 lb)

Sport
- Sport: Sprinting
- Event: 400 metres

Achievements and titles
- Olympic finals: 1976 Summer Olympics

Helen Blake (born 1 May 1951) is a Jamaican sprinter. She competed in the women's 400 metres at the 1976 Summer Olympics. Blake finished fourth in the 400 metres at the 1975 Pan American Games and sixth in the 400 metres at the 1979 Pan American Games.

== International competitions ==
Year	Competition	Venue	Position	Event	Notes
Representing Jamaica
1975	Central American and Caribbean Championships	Ponce, Puerto Rico	1st	400 m	54.8
1975	Central American and Caribbean Championships	Ponce, Puerto Rico	1st	800 m	2:17.5
1975	Pan American Games	Mexico City, Mexico	4th	400 m	52.43
1975	Pan American Games	Mexico City, Mexico	4th	4 × 400 m relay	3:32.38
1976	Olympic Games	Montreal, Canada	32nd (h)	400 m	53.93
1976	Olympic Games	Montreal, Canada	–	4 × 400 m relay	DQ
1977	Central American and Caribbean Championships	Xalapa, Mexico	2nd	400 m	52.88
1977	Central American and Caribbean Championships	Xalapa, Mexico	2nd	800 m	2:08.87
1977	Central American and Caribbean Championships	Xalapa, Mexico	2nd	4 × 400 m relay	3:42.38
1977	World Cup	Düsseldorf, West Germany	5th	4 × 400 m relay	3:31.0^{1}
1978	Central American and Caribbean Games	Medellín, Colombia	3rd	400 m	53.40
1978	Central American and Caribbean Games	Medellín, Colombia	4th	800 m	2:09.37
1978	Central American and Caribbean Games	Medellín, Colombia	2nd	4 × 400 m relay	3:41.69
1978	Commonwealth Games	Edmonton, Canada	7th	400 m	54.15
1978	Commonwealth Games	Edmonton, Canada	19th (h)	800 m	2:20.79
1978	Commonwealth Games	Edmonton, Canada	6th	4 × 400 m relay	3:37.92
1979	Pan American Games	San Juan, Puerto Rico	6th	400 m	53.41
1979	Pan American Games	San Juan, Puerto Rico	9th (h)	800 m	2:10.2

^{1}Representing the Americas

== Personal bests ==
- 400 metres – 52.43 (1975)
