= Robyn Boak =

Australian sprinter

Personal information
- Nationality: Australian
- Born: 13 April 1955 (age 71) Victoria, Australia

Sport
- Sport: Track and field
- Club: Ryde
Medal record
Representing Australia
British Commonwealth Games
Gold medal – first place	1974 Christchurch	4 × 100 metres relay

Robyn Boak (born 13 April 1955) is a former Australian sprinter. During the 1974 British Commonwealth Games in Christchurch, she won a gold medal in the 4 × 100 metres relay, and also competed in the 200 metres event.
