= 1974 European Athletics Indoor Championships – Women's 4 × 392 metres relay =

The women's 4 × 396 metres relay event at the 1974 European Athletics Indoor Championships was held on 10 March in Gothenburg. The athletes ran two laps for each leg, like in modern indoor relay races, but because the track was only 196 metres long, it resulted in an unusual distance of 392 metres for each runner.

== Results ==
Rank	Nation	Competitors	Time	Notes
1st place, gold medalist(s)	Sweden	Ann-Charlotte Hesse; Lena Fritzson; Ann-Margret Utterberg; Ann Larsson	3:38.15	
2nd place, silver medalist(s)	Bulgaria	Lilyana Tomova-Todorova; Sonya Zachariyeva; Yordanka Filipova; Tonka Petrova	3:29.21	
