= Marina Sidorova =

Personal information
- Born: 16 January 1950 (age 76) Leningrad, Soviet Union

Sport
- Sport: Track and field
Medal record
Representing Soviet Union
European Championships
Bronze medal – third place	1971 Helsinki	4×100 m relay
European Indoor Championships
Gold medal – first place	1971 Sofia	4×200 m relay
Gold medal – first place	1978 Milan	400 m
IAAF World Cup
Bronze medal – third place	1977 Dusseldorf	4×100 m relay
Bronze medal – third place	1977 Dusseldorf	4×400 m relay
Bronze medal – third place	1979 Rome	4×400 m relay
Summer Universiade
Gold medal – first place	1970 Turin	4x100 m relay
Gold medal – first place	1973 Moscow	4x100 m relay
Gold medal – first place	1975 Rome	4x100 m relay
Gold medal – first place	1977 Sofia	4x100 m relay
Silver medal – second place	1973 Moscow	200m
Silver medal – second place	1977 Sofia	200m

Marina Grigorievna Sidorova (Russian: Марина Григорьевна Сидорова-Никифорова, née Nikiforova; born 16 January 1950) is a Russian former Soviet track and field sprinter. She was a seven-time Soviet champion, winning over distances from 100 metres to 400 metres.

Born in Saint Petersburg (then Leningrad), she made her Olympic debut at age twenty-two and was a 200 metres semi-finalist and helped the Soviet women to fifth in the 4 × 100 metres relay. Her greatest individual success came at the 1978 European Athletics Indoor Championships, where she won the women's 400 metres title. She took a 400 m bronze at the 1977 IAAF World Cup and was twice a 200 m silver medallist at the Universiade. She also won three individual medals at the European Cup during her career.

With the Soviet women's relay team, she won four bronze medals at major competitions. Her first came at the 1971 European Athletics Championships, alongside Lyudmila Zharkova, Galina Bukharina and Nadezhda Besfamilnaya. She won medals in both 4 × 100 metres relay and 4 × 400 metres relay at the 1977 IAAF World Cup and returned two years later to win another bronze in the 4 × 400 metres relay in a team anchored by future Olympic champion Lyudmila Kondratyeva.

She was the daughter of two former athletes who became athletics coaches, Grigory Nikiforov and Valentina Nikiforova, who propagated a new training technique for distance running, based on long, low-speed runs and short high-speed runs.

== Personal bests ==
- 60 metres – 7.65 (1973)
- 100 metres – 11.2 (1973)
- 200 metres – 22.72 (1973)
- 400 metres – 50.98 (1977)

== International competitions ==
Year	Competition	Venue	Position	Event	Notes
1971	European Championships	Helsinki, Finland	3rd	4 × 100 m relay	44.5
1972	Olympic Games	Munich, West Germany	7th (semis)	200 m	23.40
1972	Olympic Games	Munich, West Germany	5th	4 × 100 m relay	43.59
1973	Universiade	Moscow, Soviet Union	2nd	200 m	22.72
1973	European Cup	Edinburgh, United Kingdom	3rd	100 m	11.40
1973	European Cup	Edinburgh, United Kingdom	2nd	200 m	22.93
1974	European Championships	Rome, Italy	8th (semis)	200 m	24.66
1977	European Cup	Helsinki, Finland	2nd	400 m	51.20
1977	IAAF World Cup	Düsseldorf, West Germany	3rd	400 m	51.29
1977	IAAF World Cup	Düsseldorf, West Germany	3rd	4 × 100 m relay	42.91
1977	IAAF World Cup	Düsseldorf, West Germany	3rd	4 × 400 m relay	3:27.0
1977	Universiade	Sofia, Bulgaria	2nd	200 m	23.09
1978	European Indoor Championships	Milan, Italy	1st	400 m	52.42
1979	IAAF World Cup	Montreal, Canada	3rd	4 × 100 m relay	42.52
1979	Spartakiad	Moscow, Soviet Union	3rd	200 m	23.45

== National titles ==
- Soviet Athletics Championships
  - 100 m: 1974
  - 200 m: 1973, 1974, 1977
  - 400 m: 1977
- Soviet Indoor Athletics Championships
  - 400 m: 1977, 1978

== See also ==
- List of European Athletics Championships medalists (women)
- List of European Athletics Indoor Championships medalists (women)
