= 1978 European Athletics Indoor Championships – Women's 400 metres =

The women's 400 metres event at the 1978 European Athletics Indoor Championships was held on 11 and 12 March in Milan.

== Medalists ==
Gold	Silver	Bronze
Marina Sidorova; Soviet Union	Rita Bottiglieri; Italy	Karoline Käfer; Austria

== Results ==
=== Heats ===
First 2 from each heat (Q) qualified directly for the final.

Rank	Heat	Name	Nationality	Time	Notes
1	1	Marina Sidorova	Soviet Union	53.15	Q
2	1	Rita Bottiglieri	Italy	53.51	Q
3	2	Karoline Käfer	Austria	53.81	Q
4	2	Mariya Kulchunova	Soviet Union	53.92	Q
5	1	Patricia Darbonville	France	54.26	
6	2	Jarmila Kratochvílová	Czechoslovakia	56.12	

=== Final ===
Rank	Name	Nationality	Time	Notes
1st place, gold medalist(s)	Marina Sidorova	Soviet Union	52.42	
2nd place, silver medalist(s)	Rita Bottiglieri	Italy	53.18	
3rd place, bronze medalist(s)	Karoline Käfer	Austria	53.56	
4	Mariya Kulchunova	Soviet Union	54.77	
