= Ruth Kennedy =

English athletics competitor

Personal information
- Nationality: British (English)
- Born: 13 January 1957 (age 69)

Sport
- Sport: Athletics
- Event: 400m
- Club: Notts AC
Medal record
Athletics
Representing England
Commonwealth Games
Gold medal – first place	1974 Christchurch	4 x 400m relay
Gold medal – first place	1978 Edmonton	4 x 400m relay

Ruth Kennedy (married name Ruth Patten; born 1957), is a female former athlete who competed for England.

== Biography ==
Kennedy lived at Flawforth Avenue in Ruddington, the daughter of Betty and Derek Kennedy. She attended Brincliffe Grammar School.

Coached by Colin Rains, she was the first Nottinghamshire female track athlete to represent England, in 1973. In August 1973, the team came second in the 1973 European Athletics Junior Championships in Germany.

When aged 17 and at the school, she represented England and was part of the gold medal team at the 1974 British Commonwealth Games in Christchurch, New Zealand, running the second leg, handing the baton to Jannette Roscoe on Saturday 2 February 1974, in a games record. She received the medal from Prince Philip. The gold medal-winning women's 4 × 400 metres relay team was Kennedy, Roscoe, Sue Pettett and Verona Bernard.

On Sunday 8 September 1974 in European competition in Italy, the team came 6th. In the middle of her A-levels she was rushed to Nottingham General Hospital for an operation on her appendix. She took French and Latin A levels in hospital. She had been planning to attend the Midlands Championship at Warley, against East Germany.

Ruth trained from one and half hours each night at the Harvey Hadden Stadium, with her friend Janette Roscoe. Janette and Colin Rains taught PE at Clifton College.(Trent Polytechnic), where Ruth wanted to study PE and French. She wanted to move up to 800m, as there were few British women at that distance. She flew out to Athens on 19 August 1975, where she picked up a bronze in the 1975 European Athletics Junior Championships.

But in 1976 she had an illness and never made the Olympic team. She did however in July 1976, finish third behind Verona Elder in the 400 metres event at the 1976 WAAA Championships.

She represented Trent Polytechnic at the British Students Cross Country Championships. When at Trent Polytechnic, she competed at the World Student Games in Bulgaria, and came fifth.

She played hockey for Trent Polytechnic. She took part in the British Polytechnics Championships.

When at Trent Polytechnic, she represented England and won a gold medal again in the women's 4 × 100 metres relay, at the 1978 Commonwealth Games in Edmonton, Alberta, Canada. The other team members were Joslyn Hoyte-Smith, Verona Elder and Donna Hartley. In Canada, she shared a room with Donna Hartley. Whilst that was good for team spirit, Donna Hartley was married, and her husband Bill was an athlete at the Games. Donna, aged 23, was not allowed to share a room with her own husband. Carnal relations were not apparently allowed. Alan Wells, in the Scottish team, and his wife Margot Wells, were also not allowed to share a room together. But it was strict Commonwealth policy to keep male and female sleeping arrangements separate, after some Scottish male athletes had been found in the women's area. Marea Hartman was the British women team manager.

At the Nottingham Goose Fair on 5 October 1978, she had a serious accident, with her boyfriend. At hospital, she had to have two finger nails removed. The operator, from Rochdale, was fined £800 at Nottingham magistrates in May 1979.

She married David Patten, aged 23, of Cardiff, on 18 August 1979 at Ruddington and competed under her married name thereafter. David had attended Trent Polytechnic.
