= Waltraud Dietsch =

German sprinter

Personal information
- Born: 26 November 1950 (age 75) Staßfurt, East Germany

Sport
- Sport: Athletics
- Event: Sprint
Medal record
Women's athletics
Representing East Germany
European Championships
| Gold medal – first place | 1974 Rome | 4×400 m |
European Indoor Championships
| Silver medal – second place | 1973 Rotterdam | 400 m |
| Bronze medal – third place | 1974 Gothenburg | 400 m |

Waltraud Dietsch, née Birnbaum (born 26 November 1950 in Staßfurt, East Germany) is a retired German sprinter who specialized in the 400 metres.

She won a gold medal in 4 × 400 metres relay at the 1974 European Championships, together with teammates Angelika Handt, Ellen Streidt and Brigitte Rohde. She had finished fifth in the same event at the 1969 European Championships.

In the individual event she won a silver medal at the 1973 European Indoor Championships and a bronze at the 1974 European Indoor Championships.

She competed for the club SC Magdeburg during her active career.
