= Claudia Steger =

German sprinter

Personal information
- Nationality: German
- Born: 24 April 1959 (age 66)

Sport
- Sport: Sprinting
- Event: 4 × 400 metres relay

Claudia Steger (born 24 April 1959) is a German sprinter. She competed in the women's 4 × 400 metres relay at the 1976 Summer Olympics representing West Germany.
