= Beatriz Castillo =

Cuban sprinter (born 1954)

Personal information
- Full name: Beatriz Castillo Phillippón
- Born: 17 February 1954 (age 72) Santiago de Cuba, Cuba
- Height: 1.60 m (5 ft 3 in)
- Weight: 54 kg (119 lb)

Sport
- Sport: Sprinting
- Event: 400 metres
Medal record
Women's Athletics
Representing Cuba
Pan American Games
Silver medal – second place	1971 Cali	4x400 m relay
Central American and Caribbean Games
Gold medal – first place	1978 Medellin	4x400 m relay
Silver medal – second place	1978 Medellin	400 metres
Summer Universiade
Bronze medal – third place	1977 Sofia	400 metres

Beatriz Castillo Phillippón (born 17 February 1954) is a Cuban sprinter. She competed in the women's 4 × 400 metres relay at the 1972 Summer Olympics. She also won a silver medal in the 4 x 400 metres relay at the 1971 Pan American Games.

== International competitions ==
Year	Competition	Venue	Position	Event	Notes
Representing Cuba
1971	Central American and Caribbean Championships	Kingston, Jamaica	1st	4 × 400 m relay	3:38.6
1971	Pan American Games	Cali, Colombia	2nd	4 × 400 m relay	3:34.04
1972	Olympic Games	Munich, West Germany	10th (h)	4 × 400 m relay	3:32:4
1977	Central American and Caribbean Championships	Xalapa, Mexico	1st	400 m	52.76
1977	Central American and Caribbean Championships	Xalapa, Mexico	1st	4 × 400 m relay	3:37.50
1977	Universiade	Sofia, Bulgaria	3rd	400 m	52.95
1978	Central American and Caribbean Games	Medellín, Colombia	2nd	400 m	51.27
1978	Central American and Caribbean Games	Medellín, Colombia	1st	4 × 400 m relay	3:31.34
1981	Central American and Caribbean Championships	Santo Domingo, Dominican Republic	1st	4 × 400 m relay	3:37.90

== Personal bests ==
- 400 metres – 51.27 (1978)
