= Ruth Williams-Simpson =

Jamaican sprinter

Personal information
- Nationality: Jamaican
- Born: 19 October 1949 (age 76) Saint Mary, Jamaica
- Height: 1.75 m (5 ft 9 in)
- Weight: 61 kg (134 lb)

Sport
- Sport: Sprinting
- Event: 400 metres
Medal record
Women's athletics
Representing Jamaica
Pan American Games
Bronze medal – third place	1971 Cali	4x400 m relay
Central American and Caribbean Games
Silver medal – second place	1978 Medellin	4x400 m relay

Ruth Williams-Simpson (born 19 October 1949) is a Jamaican sprinter. She competed in the 400 metres at the 1972, 1976 and the 1980 Summer Olympics. She won a bronze medal in the 4 x 400 metres relay at the 1971 Pan American Games.

Williams-Simpson competed for the Texas Woman's Pioneers track and field team, finishing runner-up in the 300 m at the 1980 AIAW Indoor Track and Field Championships.

== International competitions ==
Year	Competition	Venue	Position	Event	Notes
Representing Jamaica
1971	Central American and Caribbean Championships	Kingston, Jamaica	2nd	4 x 400 m relay	3:41.0
1971	Pan American Games	Cali, Colombia	3rd	4 × 400 m relay	3:34.05
1972	Olympic Games	Munich, West Germany	36th (h)	400 m	55.72
1972	Olympic Games	Munich, West Germany	9th (h)	4 × 400 m relay	3:31.98
1973	Central American and Caribbean Championships	Maracaibo, Venezuela	3rd	200 m	23.9
1974	British Commonwealth Games	Christchurch, New Zealand	5th	200 m	23.39
1975	Central American and Caribbean Championships	Ponce, Puerto Rico	3rd	400 m	55.7
1975	Central American and Caribbean Championships	Ponce, Puerto Rico	1st	800 m	2:17.5
1975	Pan American Games	Mexico City, Mexico	4th	4 × 400 m relay	3:32.38
1976	Olympic Games	Montreal, Canada	28th (qf)	400 m	53.88
1976	Olympic Games	Montreal, Canada	–	4 × 400 m relay	DQ
1977	Central American and Caribbean Championships	Xalapa, Mexico	2nd	4 × 400 m relay	3:42.38
1978	Central American and Caribbean Games	Medellín, Colombia	5th	400 m	55.22
1978	Central American and Caribbean Games	Medellín, Colombia	2nd	4 × 400 m relay	3:41.69
1978	Commonwealth Games	Edmonton, Canada	16th (sf)	400 m	57.03
1980	Olympic Games	Moscow, Soviet Union	33rd (h)	400 m	55.59
1980	Olympic Games	Moscow, Soviet Union	9th (h)	4 × 400 m relay	3:31.5

== Personal bests ==
- 400 metres – 52.8 (1976)
