= Sue Pettett =

English sprinter

Personal information
- Nationality: English
- Born: 23 January 1956 (age 70) Kent
Medal record
Athletics
Representing England
Commonwealth Games
Gold medal – first place	1974 Christchurch	4 x 400m relay

Susan Pettett (married name Susan Smith) (born 1956), is a female former athlete who competed for England.

== Early life ==
She went to Tonbridge Grammar School. Her father John worked for British Rail at Waterloo, who trained with her three times a week at the Judd School track. She lived at 15 Meadow Road.

== Athletics career ==
She represented England and won a gold medal in the women's 4 × 400 metres relay with Jannette Roscoe, Ruth Kennedy and Verona Bernard, at the 1974 British Commonwealth Games in Christchurch, New Zealand.
