= Gladys Taylor (athlete) =

British sprinter (born 1953)

Personal information
- Nationality: British/Jamaican
- Born: 5 March 1953 (age 73) Jamaica
- Height: 180 cm (5 ft 11 in)
- Weight: 62 kg (137 lb)

Sport
- Event: Sprinting/400 metres
- Club: Highgate Harriers; Essex Ladies AC

Gladys Taylor (born 5 March 1953) is a British/Jamaican female retired sprinter who competed at the 1976 Summer Olympics.

== Biography ==
Taylor finished second behind Helen Golden in the 200 metres event at the 1975 WAAA Championships.

At the 1976 Olympics Games in Montreal, she represented Great Britain in the women's 400 metres.

Taylor married Grant McCormack in late 1976 and competed under her married name when finishing second behind Verona Elder at the 1977 WAAA Championships.

Reverting to her maiden name Taylor, she represented England in the 400 metres and 4 x 400 metres relay events, at the 1982 Commonwealth Games in Brisbane, Queensland, Australia.

Taylor became the British 400 metres hurdles champion at the 1984 WAAA Championships.

Gladys went on to have one child - a daughter - Tara Bird (born 1987) - who also went on to compete internationally representing both England and Great Britain in athletics.
