= Sheila Ingram =

American sprinter (1957–2020)

Personal information
- Full name: Sheila Rena Ingram
- Born: March 23, 1957 Washington, D.C., U.S.
- Died: September 1, 2020 (aged 63)
Medal record
Women's athletics
Representing United States
Olympic Games
Silver medal – second place	1976 Montreal	4 × 400 meters

Sheila Rena Ingram (March 23, 1957 – September 1, 2020) was an American athlete who competed mainly in the 400 metres.

Born in Washington, D.C., she competed for United States in the 1976 Summer Olympics held in Montreal, Canada in the 4 × 400 metres where she won the silver medal with her teammates Debra Sapenter, Pamela Jiles and Rosalyn Bryant. She was the 1976 National Champion, behind Lorna Forde a guest participant from Barbados.
