= Verna Burnard =

Australian sprinter

Personal information
- Nationality: Australian
- Born: 19 August 1956 (age 69)

Sport
- Sport: Sprinting
- Event: 400 metres

Verna Burnard (born 19 August 1956) is an Australian sprinter. She competed in the women's 400 metres and 4x400 metres at the 1976 Summer Olympics.
