= Jan Svendsen =

American shot putter

Personal information
- Nationality: American
- Born: November 9, 1948 (age 77)

Sport
- Sport: Athletics
- Event: Shot put

Jan Svendsen (born November 9, 1948) is an American athlete. She competed in the women's shot put at the 1972 Summer Olympics.
