= Doris Maletzki =

East German sprinter

Personal information
- Born: 11 June 1952 (age 74) Salzwedel, East Germany

Sport
- Sport: Track and field
Medal record
Representing East Germany
Olympic Games
Gold medal – first place	1976 Montreal	4 × 400 m relay
European Championships
Gold medal – first place	1974 Rome	4 × 100 m relay
Summer Universiade
Bronze medal – third place	1973 Moscow	4 x 400 m relay

Doris Maletzki (for some time Brachmann, born 11 June 1952) is a retired East German sprinter who specialised in the 200 metres.

She won a gold medal in 4 × 100 metres relay at the 1974 European Championships, together with teammates Christina Heinich, Bärbel Eckert and Renate Stecher. At the 1976 Summer Olympics in Montreal she won a gold medal in 4 × 400 metre relay, with her teammates Brigitte Rohde, 400 m silver medalist Christina Brehmer and 400 m bronze medalist Ellen Streidt. She competed for the club SC Dynamo Berlin during her active career.

Maletzki served as managing director of football club BFC Dynamo in 2001. She was elected as the first woman to the presidium of the Berlin Football Association (BFV) in 2004. Maletzki serves as the vice chairman of the financial committee of BFV as of 2021. She is a representative of BFC Dynamo in the BFV.
