= Robert Taylor (sprinter, born 1953) =

American sprinter

Personal information
- Full name: Robert Earl Taylor
- Born: April 29, 1953 (age 73)
Medal record
Men's Athletics
Representing the United States
Pan American Games
| Gold medal – first place | 1975 Mexico City | 4x400 metres |
IAAF World Cup
| Bronze medal – third place | 1977 Düsseldorf | 400 metres |

Robert Earl Taylor (born April 29, 1953) is an American former sprinter.

At the 1975 Pan American Games, Taylor was a member of gold medal winning 4 × 400 m relay team and won the AAU championships in 400 m in 1977.

Taylor came third in the 400 meters at the 1977 IAAF Athletics World Cup in Düsseldorf whilst representing the US. By virtue of this, he was part of a controversy as the race was re-run the day after the first run because Alberto Juantorena (of Cuba representing the Americas) lodged a successful protest that he had not been able to hear the starter's gun in the first race.

Taylor was ranked as one of the best 400 m runners in 1976 and 1977.

400 meters
| Year | World rank | US rank |
|---|---|---|
| 1975 | - | 7th |
| 1976 | 7th | 5th |
| 1977 | 3rd | 1st |
| 1978 | - | 7th |
