= Joyce Yakubowich =

Canadian sprinter (1953–2024)

Personal information
- Born: Joyce Sadowick; 29 May 1953 Burnaby, British Columbia, Canada
- Died: 24 March 2024 (aged 70)

Sport
- Country: Canada
- Sport: Women's athletics
Medal record
Pan American Games
Gold medal – first place	1975 Mexico City	400 m
Gold medal – first place	1975 Mexico City	4 × 400 m relay
Bronze medal – third place	1975 Mexico City	4 × 100 m relay
Commonwealth Games
Bronze medal – third place	1970 Edinburgh	4 × 100 m relay

Joyce Yakubowich (née Sadowick; 29 May 1953 – 24 March 2024) was a Canadian track and field sprinter who competed mainly in the 200 metres and 400 metres. She was the 400m gold medallist at the 1975 Pan American Games, where she also won relay medals. She twice represented Canada at the Summer Olympics (1972, 1976) and was a three-time Canadian national sprint champion.

== Career ==
Born in Burnaby, British Columbia, she made her international debut at age seventeen at the 1970 British Commonwealth Games. She was eliminated in the heats of the 400 m, but managed to secure a bronze medal with the Canadian women's 4 × 100 m relay team, which included Joan Hendry, Patty Loverock and Stephanie Berto. She went on to attend the University of Victoria and broke several track records, including one for the 300 metres which remains unbeaten.

Yakubowich ran at the 1971 Pan American Games and made her first individual final, taking sixth in the 400 m. With the Canadian relay team she missed a medal, taking fourth some distance behind bronze medallists Jamaica. Her first national titles came at the 1972 Canadian Track and Field Championships, where she claimed both the 200 m and 400 m races – the latter in a championship record of 54.1 seconds. An Olympic debut came the following year at the 1972 Munich Games, but the 19-year-old failed to make it out of the heats. She gained her first individual medal a year later at the 1973 Pacific Conference Games, taking 400 m bronze.

The 1975 season proved to be the peak of her career. First, she won the third and final national title of her career in the 200 m. She was chosen to compete in four events at the 1975 Pan American Games. She placed sixth in the 200 m final, recording a lifetime best time of 23.34 seconds. She gave a dominant performance in the women's 400 m final, defeating American Debra Sapenter by over half a second to win the gold medal in 51.62 seconds – another lifetime personal record and also a games record. Another games record and gold medal came with the 4 × 400 m relay team of Margaret McGowen, Rachelle Campbell, and Joanne McTaggart, which she led off to victory to 3:30.36 minutes. A third medal of the games for Yakubowich came in the 4 × 100 metres relay: running the anchor leg off McTaggart and 100 m minor medallists Patty Loverock and Marjorie Bailey the team took the bronze.

She made two further high-profile international appearances in her career following her Pan American success. She returned to the Olympic stage at the 1976 Montreal Olympics, running in the 400 m quarter-finals and placing eighth in the relay final on home turf alongside fellow Canadians Margaret Stride, Campbell and Yvonne Saunders. Her last outing was for the Americas team at the 1977 IAAF World Cup: running with Cuba's Aurelia Pentón and Jamaicans Jacqueline Pusey and Helen Blake, she placed fifth.

== International competitions ==
Year	Competition	Venue	Position	Event	Notes
1970	British Commonwealth Games	Edinburgh, United Kingdom	6th (heats)	400 m	55.2
1970	British Commonwealth Games	Edinburgh, United Kingdom	3rd	4 × 100 m relay	44.68
1971	Pan American Games	Cali, Colombia	6th	400 m	54.88
1971	Pan American Games	Cali, Colombia	4th	4 × 400 m relay	3:41.23
1972	Olympic Games	Munich, Germany	6th (heats)	400 m	54.59
1973	Pacific Conference Games	Toronto, Ontario, Canada	3rd	400 m	54.0
1975	Pan American Games	Mexico City, Mexico	6th	200 m	23.34
1975	Pan American Games	Mexico City, Mexico	1st	400 m	51.62 GR
1975	Pan American Games	Mexico City, Mexico	3rd	4 × 100 m relay	43.68
1975	Pan American Games	Mexico City, Mexico	1st	4 × 400 m relay	3:30.36 GR
1976	Olympic Games	Montreal, Quebec, Canada	7th (q-finals)	400 m	55.02
1976	Olympic Games	Montreal, Quebec, Canada	8th	4 × 400 m relay	3:28.91
1977	IAAF World Cup	Düsseldorf, Germany	5th	4 × 400 m relay	3:31.0

== National titles ==
- Canadian Track and Field Championships
  - 200 m: 1972, 1975
  - 400 m: 1972
