= Angelika Handt =

East German sprinter

Medal record

Women's athletics

Representing East Germany

European Championships
Gold medal – first place	1974 Rome	4×400 m

Angelika Kahl, née Handt (born 10 July 1954 in Radebeul, Bezirk Dresden) is a retired East German sprinter who specialized in the 400 metres.

She won a gold medal in 4 × 400 metres relay at the 1974 European Championships, together with teammates Waltraud Dietsch, Ellen Streidt and Brigitte Rohde. She finished fifth in the individual event at the same European Championships, as well as fourth at the 1974 European Indoor Championships.

She competed for the club SC Einheit Dresden during her active career.
