= Ann Larsson (athlete) =

Swedish sprinter

Personal information
- Full name: Ann Hillevi Larsson
- Nationality: Swedish
- Born: 25 June 1955 (age 71)

Sport
- Sport: Sprinting
- Event: 4 × 400 metres relay
Medal record
Women's athletics
Representing Sweden
European Indoor Championships
Gold medal – first place	1974 Gothenburg	4×392 m

Ann Hillevi Larsson (born 25 June 1955) is a Swedish sprinter. She competed in the women's 4 × 400 metres relay at the 1972 Summer Olympics.
