= Elke Barth =

German sprinter (born 1956)

Personal information
- Nationality: German
- Born: 19 October 1956 (age 69) Stolberg, Nordrhein-Westfalen, Germany
- Height: 167 cm (5 ft 6 in)
- Weight: 53 kg (117 lb)

Sport
- Sport: Sprinting
- Event: 4 × 400 metres relay
Medal record
Women's athletics
Representing West Germany
European Indoor Championships
Silver medal – second place	1975 Katowice	4×320 m

Elke Barth (born 19 October 1956) is a German sprinter. She competed in the women's 4 × 400 metres relay at the 1976 Summer Olympics representing West Germany.
