= Rose Asiedua =

Ghanaian-British nurse and former athlete

Personal information
- Nationality: Ghanaian
- Born: Kumasi
- Occupation: Nursing
- Employer: National Health Service
- Children: Kevin Amankwaah

Sport
- Country: Ghana
- Sport: Track and Field
- Events: 100 m, 200 m, 4×100 m

Achievements and titles
- Commonwealth finals: 100m
Medal record
Women's athletics
Representing Ghana
Commonwealth Games
Bronze medal – third place	1974 Christchurch	4 × 100 m
All-Africa Games
Silver medal – second place	1973 Lagos	100 m
Gold medal – first place	1973 Lagos	4 × 100 m

Rose Amankwah, formerly referred to as Rose Asiedua, is a retired Ghanaian-British nurse and former athlete. She was born in Kumasi

In 1973, she represented Ghana at the 1973 All-Africa Games held in Nigeria and won a silver and gold in the 100 meters and 4 × 100 m relay sprints respectively.

Amankwah also won a gold medal in a 200 meters race in an Africa versus America athletics competition in 1973 and a bronze medal in the 4×100 meters relay at the Commonwealth Games in New Zealand in 1974. She represented Ghana in the same race at the 1972 Munich Olympic Games.

In 1974 Amankwah migrated to the United Kingdom, where she trained as a nurse, ultimately becoming a theatre matron at Central Middlesex Hospital. After 49 years of service at the hospital, she retired in 2024, aged 72.

== International competitions ==
Year	Competition	Venue	Position	Event	Notes
1973	All-Africa Games	Lagos, Nigeria	2nd	100 m	
1973	All-Africa Games	Lagos, Nigeria	1st	4 x 100 m	
1974	British Commonwealth Games	Christchurch, New Zealand	3rd	4 x 100 m	
