= Fred Samara =

American decathlete

Personal information
- Born: April 6, 1950 (age 76) Brooklyn, New York, United States

Sport
- Sport: Athletics
- Event: Decathlon

Fred Samara (born April 6, 1950) is an American athlete. He competed in the men's decathlon at the 1976 Summer Olympics.

Samara competed for the Penn Quakers track and field team in the NCAA. He later coached the Princeton Tigers track and field team.
