= Debra Sapenter =

American sprinter

Personal information
- Full name: Deborah Elaine Sapenter
- Born: February 27, 1952 (age 74) Prairie View, Texas, U.S.
- Height: 5 ft 7 in (1.70 m)
- Weight: 115 lb (52 kg)
Medal record
Women's athletics
Representing United States
Olympic Games
Silver medal – second place	1976 Montreal	4 × 400 meters
Pan American Games
Silver medal – second place	1975 Mexico City	400 meters
Silver medal – second place	1975 Mexico City	4 x 400 meters

Deborah Elaine Sapenter (born February 27, 1952), is an American athlete who competed mainly in the 400 meters. She was born in Prairie View, Texas. In 1975 she was rated as the number one 400 meter women's sprinter in the United States. She competed for United States in the 1976 Summer Olympics, held in Montreal, in the 4 × 400 metres relay where she won the silver medal with her teammates Sheila Ingram, Pamela Jiles and Rosalyn Bryant.

After her running career Sapenter found a career in Information Technology holding Corporate CIO positions at Genuity, Harvard Pilgrim HealthCare / Harvard Vanguard, and Zürich Financial Group. In 1995 she was inducted into the Southwestern Athletic Conference Hall of Fame as Debra Sapenter-Speight.
