= Riitta Salin =

Finnish sprinter (born 1950)

Personal information
- Born: 16 October 1950 (age 76) Helsinki, Finland
- Height: 1.75 m (5 ft 9 in)
- Weight: 58 kg (128 lb)

Sport
- Sport: Track and field
- Club: Viipurin Urheilijat, Helsinki
Medal record
Women's athletics
Representing Finland
European Championships
Gold medal – first place	1974 Rome	400 m
Silver medal – second place	1974 Rome	4×400 m

Riitta Liisa Salin, née Hagman, (16 October 1950) is a Finnish retired sprinter who specialized in the 400 metres.

She won the gold medal in 1974 European Athletics Championships with a world record time 50.14. As of 2026, this mark remains the standing Finnish national record. At the 1976 Summer Olympics, Salin finished seventh.

Her brother was former ice hockey player Matti Hagman.
