= Inta Kļimoviča =

Soviet sprinter

Personal information
- Born: 14 December 1951 (age 74) Ventspils, Soviet Union

Sport
- Sport: Track and field
Medal record
Representing Soviet Union
Olympic Games
Bronze medal – third place	1976 Montreal	4×400m relay
European Championships
Bronze medal – third place	1974 Rome	4×400m relay
European Indoor Championships
Gold medal – first place	1975 Katowice	4×320m relay
Bronze medal – third place	1975 Katowice	400m
Bronze medal – third place	1976 Munich	400m
Summer Universiade
Gold medal – first place	1975 Rome	4x100m relay
Silver medal – second place	1975 Rome	400m

Inta Kļimoviča (born 14 December 1951) is a Soviet Latvian athlete who competed mainly in the 400 metres.

Born Inta Drēviņa, Kļimoviča trained at VSS Varpa in Riga. She competed for the USSR in the 1976 Summer Olympics held in Montreal, Quebec, Canada in the 4 × 400 metres where she won the bronze medal with her teammates Lyudmila Aksyonova, Natalya Sokolova and Nadezhda Ilyina.
