= 1975 European Athletics Indoor Championships =

- Dates: 8–9 March 1975
- Host city: Katowice; Poland
- Venue: Rondo
- Events: 21
- Participation: 270 athletes from 24 nations
- Records set: 1 WR, 2 CR

The 1975 European Athletics Indoor Championships were held in 1975 in Katowice, Poland.

The track used for these championships was 160 metres long. A two-lap relay race was organised over an unusual distance of 320 metres for each leg. This was the last edition to feature relay races until 2000.

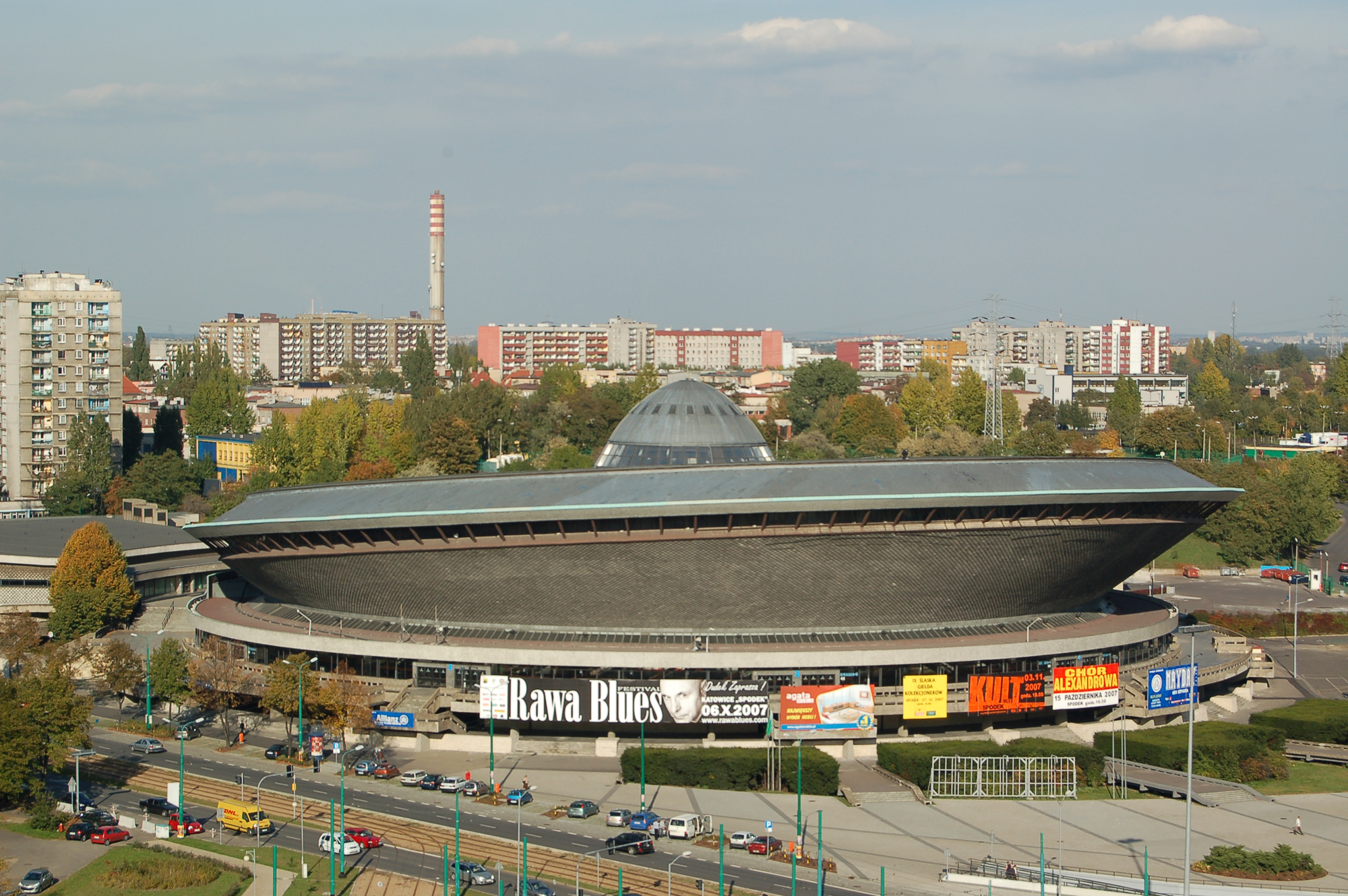
The host venue in Katowice

== Medal summary ==
=== Men ===
Event	Gold		Silver		Bronze	
60 metres	Valeriy Borzov; Soviet Union	6.59	Aleksandr Aksinin; Soviet Union	6.67	Zenon Licznerski; Poland	6.74
400 metres	Hermann Köhler; West Germany	48.76	Josip Alebić; Yugoslavia	49.04	Semyon Kocher; Soviet Union	49.33
800 metres	Gerhard Stolle; East Germany	1:49.8	Ivo Van Damme; Belgium	1:50.1	Vladimir Ponomaryov; Soviet Union	1:50.2
1500 metres	Thomas Wessinghage; West Germany	3:44.6	Pyotr Anisim; Soviet Union	3:45.5	Gheorghe Ghipu; Romania	3:45.4
3000 metres	Ian Stewart; Great Britain	7:58.6	Pekka Päivärinta; Finland	7:58.6	Boris Kuznetsov; Soviet Union	8:01.2
60 metres hurdles	Leszek Wodzyński; Poland	7.69	Frank Siebeck; East Germany	7.69	Eduard Pereverzev; Soviet Union	7.74
4 × 320 metres relay	Klaus Ehl; Franz-Peter Hofmeister; Karl Honz; Hermann Köhler; West Germany	2:29.9	Wiesław Puchalski; Roman Siedlecki; Jerzy Włodarczyk; Wojciech Romanowski; Poland	2:31.4	Krassimir Gutev; Narzis Popov; Yordan Yordanov; Yanko Bratanov; Bulgaria	2:32.1
High jump	Vladimír Malý; Czechoslovakia	2.21	Endre Kelemen; Hungary	2.19	Rune Almén; Sweden	2.19
Pole vault	Antti Kalliomäki; Finland	5.35	Wojciech Buciarski; Poland	5.30	Władysław Kozakiewicz; Poland	5.30
Long jump	Jacques Rousseau; France	7.94	Hans-Jürgen Berger; West Germany	7.87	Zbigniew Beta; Poland	7.82
Triple jump	Viktor Sanyeyev; Soviet Union	17.01	Michał Joachimowski; Poland	16.90	Gennady Bessonov; Soviet Union	16.78
Shot put	Valcho Stoev; Bulgaria	20.19	Geoff Capes; Great Britain	19.98	Valeriy Voykin; Soviet Union	19.44

=== Women ===
Event	Gold		Silver		Bronze	
60 metres	Andrea Lynch; Great Britain	7.17	Monika Meyer; East Germany	7.24	Irena Szewińska; Poland	7.26
400 metres	Verona Elder; Great Britain	52.68	Nadezhda Ilyina; Soviet Union	53.21	Inta Kļimoviča; Soviet Union	53.91
800 metres	Anita Barkusky; East Germany	2:05.6	Sarmīte Štūla; Soviet Union	2:06.2	Rositsa Pekhlivanova; Bulgaria	2:06.3
1500 metres	Natalia Andrei; Romania	4:14.7	Tatyana Kazankina; Soviet Union	4:14.8	Ellen Wellmann; West Germany	4:16.2
60 metres hurdles	Grażyna Rabsztyn; Poland	8.04	Annelie Ehrhardt; East Germany	8.12	Tatyana Anisimova; Soviet Union	8.21
4 × 320 metres relay	Inta Kļimoviča; Ingrida Barkane; Lyudmila Aksyonova; Nadezhda Ilyina; Soviet Union	2:46.1	Elke Barth; Brigitte Koczelnik; Silvia Hollmann; Rita Wilden; West Germany	2:47.3	Zofia Zwolińska; Genowefa Nowaczyk; Krystyna Kacperczyk; Danuta Piecyk; Poland	2:49.6
High jump	Rosemarie Ackermann; East Germany	1.92 =CR	Marie-Christine Debourse; France	1.83	Annemieke Bouma; Netherlands	1.80
Long jump	Dorina Catineanu; Romania	6.31	Lidiya Alfeyeva; Soviet Union	6.29	Meta Antenen; Switzerland	6.28
Shot put	Marianne Adam; East Germany	20.05	Helena Fibingerová; Czechoslovakia	20.06	Ivanka Khristova; Bulgaria	18.35

== Medal table ==
Rank	Nation	Gold	Silver	Bronze	Total
1	East Germany (GDR)	4	3	0	7
2	Soviet Union (URS)	3	6	8	17
3	West Germany (FRG)	3	2	1	6
4	Great Britain (GBR)	3	1	0	4
5	Poland (POL)	2	3	5	10
6	Romania (ROU)	2	0	1	3
7	Czechoslovakia (TCH)	1	1	0	2
7	Finland (FIN)	1	1	0	2
7	France (FRA)	1	1	0	2
10	Bulgaria (BUL)	1	0	3	4
11	Belgium (BEL)	0	1	0	1
11	Hungary (HUN)	0	1	0	1
11	Yugoslavia (YUG)	0	1	0	1
14	Netherlands (NED)	0	0	1	1
14	Sweden (SWE)	0	0	1	1
14	Switzerland (SUI)	0	0	1	1
Totals (16 entries)		21	21	21	63

== Participating nations ==
- Austria (1)
- Belgium (9)
- Bulgaria (19)
- Czechoslovakia (21)
- Denmark (2)
- East Germany (18)
- Finland (9)
- France (20)
- Great Britain (8)
- Greece (6)
- Hungary (5)
- Italy (7)
- Luxembourg (1)
- Netherlands (4)
- Norway (3)
- Poland (40)
- Romania (8)
- Soviet Union (43)
- Spain (7)
- Sweden (6)
- Switzerland (3)
- Turkey (4)
- West Germany (25)
- Yugoslavia (1)
