= Yordanka Ivanova =

Bulgarian sprinter (born 1950)

Personal information
- Nationality: Bulgarian
- Born: 25 February 1950 (age 76) Pleven, Bulgaria

Sport
- Sport: Sprinting
- Event: 4 × 400 metres relay
Medal record
Women's athletics
Representing Bulgaria
European Indoor Championships
Silver medal – second place	1974 Gothenburg	4×392 m

Yordanka Ivanova (née Filipova, Bulgarian: Йорданка Иванова-Филипова; born 25 February 1950) is a Bulgarian sprinter. She competed in the women's 4 × 400 metres relay at the 1976 Summer Olympics.
