= Ashanti Obi =

Nigerian sprinter

Personal information
- Nationality: Nigerian
- Born: 14 October 1952 (age 73)

Sport
- Sport: Sprinting
- Event: 4 × 100 metres relay

Ashanti Obi (born 14 October 1952) is a Nigerian sprinter. She competed in the women's 4 × 100 metres relay at the 1972 Summer Olympics.
