= Jelica Pavličić =

Croatian sprinter

Personal information
- Nationality: Croatian
- Born: 4 February 1954 (age 72) Slunj, SR Croatia, Yugoslavia
- Height: 1.76 m (5 ft 9 in)
- Weight: 64 kg (141 lb)

Sport
- Sport: Sprinting
- Event: 400 metres
- Club: AK Slavonija
Medal record
Women's athletics
Representing Yugoslavia
European Indoor Championships
Gold medal – first place	1974 Gothenburg	400 m
Silver medal – second place	1976 Munich	400 m
Bronze medal – third place	1977 San Sebastián	400 m
Mediterranean Games
Gold medal – first place	1975 Algiers	400 m
Gold medal – first place	1979 Split	400 m
Gold medal – first place	1979 Split	4x400 m relay
Silver medal – second place	1975 Algiers	100 m
Silver medal – second place	1975 Algiers	4x100 m relay
Summer Universiade
Bronze medal – third place	1975 Rome	200 m
Bronze medal – third place	1975 Rome	400 m

Jelica Pavličić-Štefančić (born 4 February 1954) is a retired Croatian sprinter. She competed for Yugoslavia in the women's 400 metres at the 1976 Summer Olympics.

Awards
Preceded by Vera Nikolić	Yugoslav Sportswoman of the Year; 1973	Succeeded by Nataša Urbančič
