= Barbara Martin (athlete) =

English former sprinter

Personal information
- Nationality: British (English)
- Born: 26 February 1955 (age 71)

Sport
- Sport: Athletics
- Event: Sprints
- Club: London Olympiades
Medal record
Athletics
Representing England
Commonwealth Games
Silver medal – second place	1974 Christchurch	4 x 100m relay

Barbara Ann Martin (born 26 February 1955), is a female former athlete who competed for England.

== Biography ==
Martin finished third behind Andrea Lynch in the 100 metres event and third behind Helen Golden in the 200 metres event at the 1973 WAAA Championships.

Martin represented England and won a silver medal in the 4 x 100 metres relay with Andrea Lynch, Judy Vernon and Sonia Lannaman, at the 1974 British Commonwealth Games in Christchurch, New Zealand.
