= Jozefína Čerchlanová =

Slovak middle-distance runner

Personal information
- Nationality: Slovak
- Born: 29 March 1952 (age 74) Bratislava, Czechoslovakia

Sport
- Sport: Middle-distance running
- Event: 800 metres
Medal record
Representing Czechoslovakia
Summer Universiade
Silver medal – second place	1975 Rome	800m

Jozefína Čerchlanová (born 29 March 1952) is a Slovak middle-distance runner. She competed in the women's 800 metres at the 1976 Summer Olympics, representing Czechoslovakia.
