= Debbie Byfield =

Jamaican sprinter (born 1954)

Personal information
- Nationality: Jamaican
- Born: 5 June 1954 (age 71)

Sport
- Sport: Sprinting
- Event: 4 × 100 metres relay

Debbie Byfield (born 5 June 1954) is a Jamaican sprinter. She competed in the women's 4 × 100 metres relay at the 1972 Summer Olympics. She placed seventh in the 400 metres at the 1975 Pan American Games. She is the mother of sprinter Kelli White.
