= Ellen Streidt =

East German sprinter

Personal information
- Born: 27 July 1952 (age 73) Wittstock, East Germany

Sport
- Sport: Track and field
Medal record
Representing East Germany
Olympic Games
| Gold medal – first place | 1976 Montreal | 4×400 m relay |
| Bronze medal – third place | 1976 Montreal | 400 m |
European Championships
| Gold medal – first place | 1974 Rome | 4×400 m relay |
| Silver medal – second place | 1971 Helsinki | 4×100 m relay |
| Silver medal – second place | 1974 Rome | 400 m |
Summer Universiade
| Bronze medal – third place | 1973 Moscow | 100 m |
| Bronze medal – third place | 1973 Moscow | 200 m |
| Bronze medal – third place | 1973 Moscow | 4x100 m relay |

Ellen Streidt (née Stropahl later Wendland, born 27 July 1952) is a retired East German sprinter who specialised in the 200 metres and 400 metres.

At the 1972 Summer Olympics in Munich, she finished fourth in the 200 m final, just one one-hundredth of a second behind bronze medallist Irena Szewińska. At the 1976 Summer Olympics in Montreal, she won the bronze medal in the 400 metres and a gold medal in the 4 × 400 metres with her teammates Brigitte Rohde, Christina Brehmer and Doris Maletzki.

== Achievements ==
| Year | Tournament | Venue | Result | Event | Time |
|---|---|---|---|---|---|
| 1971 | European Championships | Helsinki, Finland | 7th | 200 m | |
| 1971 | European Championships | Helsinki, Finland | 2nd | 4 × 100 m relay | |
| 1972 | Olympic Games | Munich, West Germany | 4th | 200 m | 22.75 |
| 1973 | Universiade | Moscow, Soviet Union | 3rd | 100 m | 11.63 |
| 1973 | Universiade | Moscow, Soviet Union | 3rd | 200 m | 22.73 |
| 1973 | Universiade | Moscow, Soviet Union | 3rd | 4 × 100 m relay | 44.44 |
| 1974 | European Championships | Rome, Italy | 2nd | 400 m | |
| 1974 | European Championships | Rome, Italy | 1st | 4 × 400 m relay | |
| 1976 | Olympic Games | Montreal, Canada | 3rd | 400 m | 50.55 |
| 1976 | Olympic Games | Montreal, Canada | 1st | 4 × 400 m relay | 3:19.23 |
