= Brigitte Rohde =

East German sprinter (born 1954)

Medal record

Women's athletics

Representing East Germany

Olympic Games
Gold medal – first place	1976 Montreal	4×400 m

European Championships
Gold medal – first place	1974 Rome	4×400 m

Brigitte Köhn (née Rohde; born 8 October 1954) is a retired East German sprinter who specialised in the 400 metres and later 400 metres hurdles.

She won a gold medal in 4 × 400 metres relay at the 1974 European Championships, together with teammates Waltraud Dietsch, Ellen Streidt and Angelika Handt. At the 1976 Summer Olympics in Montreal she won another gold medal in same event, with her teammates Doris Maletzki, 400 m silver medalist Christina Brehmer and 400 m bronze medalist Ellen Streidt.

After the 1976 Olympics she married, bore a child and changed event to the 400 metres hurdles. She placed fourth in her new event at the 1978 European Championships.

She competed for the club SC Neubrandenburg during her active career.
