= Karoline Käfer =

Austrian sprinter (1954–2023)

Medal record

Women's athletics

Representing Austria

European Indoor Championships
Silver medal – second place	1973 Rotterdam	4×170 m
Silver medal – second place	1980 Sindelfingen	400 m
Bronze medal – third place	1978 Milan	400 m
Bronze medal – third place	1979 Vienna	400 m

Karoline Käfer (31 October 1954 – 11 March 2023) was an Austrian sprinter. She won three medals at the European Indoor Championships.

With 23.09 seconds over 200 metres and 50.62 seconds over 400 metres Käfer holds two Austrian records.

Käfer died on 11 March 2023, at the age of 68.

== Achievements ==
Year	Tournament	Venue	Result	Extra
1978	European Indoor Championships	Milan, Italy	3rd	400 metres
1979	European Indoor Championships	Vienna, Austria	3rd	400 metres
1980	European Indoor Championships	Sindelfingen, West Germany	2nd	400 metres
