= Dagmar Fuhrmann =

German sprinter

Personal information
- Nationality: German
- Born: 6 April 1954 (age 72)

Sport
- Sport: Sprinting
- Event: 400 metres
Medal record
Women's athletics
Representing West Germany
European Indoor Championships
Gold medal – first place	1973 Rotterdam	4×340 m

Dagmar Fuhrmann (née Jost; born 6 April 1954) is a German sprinter. She competed in the women's 400 metres at the 1976 Summer Olympics representing West Germany.

At the West German championships, she won the 400 metres in 1977 and the 400 metres indoors in 1978. She also won silver medals in 1976 as well as 1976 and 1977 indoors. She took bronze medal in 1973, 1974 (both indoors) and 1975 outdoors as well as the 200 metres bronze in 1975. She represented the clubs TG Bad Homburg and LG Frankfurt.
