= Rachelle Campbell =

Canadian sprinter (born 1956)

Personal information
- Nationality: Canadian
- Born: 30 October 1956 (age 70) Guelph, Ontario

Sport
- Sport: Sprinting
- Event: 400 metres

Rachelle Campbell (born 30 October 1956) is a Canadian sprinter. She competed in the women's 400 metres at the 1976 Summer Olympics. She won a gold medal in the 1975 Pan American Games 4 × 400 metres Relay (with Joyce Sadowick, Margaret McGowen and Joanne McTaggart). Campbell also won a bronze medal in the 4 x 400 metres relay at the 1978 Commonwealth Games.
