= Rosalyn Bryant =

American athlete (born 1956)

Personal information
- Born: Rosalyn Evette Bryant; January 7, 1956 (age 70) Chicago, Illinois, U.S.
Medal record
Women's athletics
Representing the United States
Olympic Games
Silver medal – second place	1976 Montreal	4 x 400 meters
Summer Universiade
Gold medal – first place	1977 Sofia	400 meters
Silver medal – second place	1979 Mexico City	400 meters
Pan American Games
Gold medal – first place	1979 San Juan	4 x 400 meters

Rosalyn Evette Bryant (married Clark; born January 7, 1956) is an American athlete who competed mainly in the 400 meters.

Born in Chicago, Illinois, she competed for the United States in the 1976 Summer Olympics held in Montreal, Canada in the 4 x 400 meters where she won the silver medal with her teammates Debra Sapenter, Sheila Ingram and Pamela Jiles. She also finished fifth in the individual 400m there. It is rumored that three of the four finishers before her used either steroids or blood doping, so many feel that she is truly the second-place finisher of that race. She also competed at the inaugural 1983 World Track and Field Championships, where she represented the US in both the open 400 m and the 4 x 400 meter relay. She finished 8th in the open 400m, the only American finalist, and anchored the US relay team to a seventh-place finish. She later became a Los Angeles police officer. Her daughter Breanna Clark is also an athlete and has competed at the Paralympic Games.

Bryant was inducted into the USTFCCCA Collegiate Athlete Hall of Fame in 2024.

Bryant competed for the Cal State Los Angeles Golden Eagles track and field team. In 1974, she competed for the Chicago State Cougars team.
