= Nadezhda Ilyina =

Soviet sprinter

Personal information
- Born: 24 January 1949 Zelenokumsk, Stavropol Kray, Soviet Union
- Died: 7 December 2013 (aged 64) Moscow, Russia

Sport
- Sport: Track and field
Medal record
Representing Soviet Union
Olympic Games
Bronze medal – third place	1976 Montreal	4×400 m
European Championships
Bronze medal – third place	1971 Helsinki	4×400 m
Bronze medal – third place	1974 Rome	4×400 m
European Indoor Championships
Gold medal – first place	1975 Katowice	4×320 m
Silver medal – second place	1972 Grenoble	4×360 m
Silver medal – second place	1974 Gothenburg	400 m
Silver medal – second place	1975 Katowice	400 m
Summer Universiade
Gold medal – first place	1973 Moscow	400 m

Nadezhda Ilyina (Russian: Надежда Ильина, née Колесникова, Kolesnikova; 24 January 1949 – 7 December 2013) was a Russian athlete who competed mainly in the 400 metres.

Ilyina trained at Dynamo in Moscow. She competed for the Soviet Union in the 1976 Summer Olympics held in Montreal, Canada in the 4 × 400 metres where she won the bronze medal with her teammates Inta Kļimoviča, Lyudmila Aksyonova and Natalya Sokolova. She was the mother of Russian tennis star Nadia Petrova.

Ilyina died in a car accident in December 2013.
