= Rita Wilden =

German sprinter

Personal information
- Born: 9 October 1947 (age 78)
Medal record
Women's athletics
Representing West Germany
Olympic Games
Silver medal – second place	1972 Munich	400 m
Bronze medal – third place	1972 Munich	4×400 m
European Championships
Silver medal – second place	1969 Athens	4×100 m
Bronze medal – third place	1974 Rome	400 m
European Indoor Championships
Gold medal – first place	1972 Grenoble	4×180 m
Gold medal – first place	1972 Grenoble	4×360 m
Gold medal – first place	1973 Rotterdam	4×170 m
Gold medal – first place	1976 Munich	400 m
Silver medal – second place	1975 Katowice	4×320 m

Rita Wilden (née Jahn; born 9 October 1947 in Leipzig) is a German athlete, who competed mainly in the 400 metres.

She competed for West Germany in the 1972 Summer Olympics held in Munich in the 400 metres where she won the silver medal. Later on in the same Games she helped her teammates Anette Rückes, Inge Bödding and Hildegard Falck to a bronze in the first Olympic women's 4 × 400 m relay. Previously as Rita Jahn she had competed in the 200 metres and on the West German 4 × 100 m relay team at the 1968 Olympics, the team finishing 6th. 1976 was her third and last Olympics, making the semi-final round in the 400, and her team finishing 5th in the 4 × 400.

She achieved a silver medal on the West German 4 × 100 metres relay team at the 1969 European Championships and a bronze medal at the 1974 European Championships.
