= Danuta Piecyk =

Polish sprinter

Personal information
- Nationality: Polish
- Born: 27 September 1950 Stargard, Poland
- Died: 13 April 2011 (aged 60) Olsztyn, Poland

Sport
- Sport: Sprinting
- Event: 400 metres
Medal record
Women's athletics
Representing Poland
European Indoor Championships
Bronze medal – third place	1973 Rotterdam	4×340 m
Bronze medal – third place	1975 Katowice	4×320 m

Danuta Piecyk (27 September 1950 – 13 April 2011) was a Polish sprinter. She competed in the women's 400 metres at the 1972 Summer Olympics.
