= Verona Elder =

British athlete (born 1953)

Verona Elder née Bernard
Personal information
- Nationality: British (English)
- Born: 5 April 1953 (age 73) Wolverhampton, England
- Height: 170 cm (5 ft 7 in)
- Weight: 63 kg (139 lb)

Sport
- Sport: Athletics
- Event: 400 m
- Club: WBAC
Medal record
Women's athletics
Representing Great Britain
European Indoor Championships
Gold medal – first place	1973 Rotterdam	400 m
Gold medal – first place	1975 Katowice	400 m
Gold medal – first place	1979 Vienna	400 m
Silver medal – second place	1977 San Sebastián	400 m
Bronze medal – third place	1981 Grenoble	400 m
Representing England
Commonwealth Games
Gold medal – first place	1974 Christchurch	4×400 m
Gold medal – first place	1978 Edmonton	4×400 m
Silver medal – second place	1974 Christchurch	400 m
Silver medal – second place	1978 Edmonton	400 m

Verona Marolin Elder (née Verona Bernard) MBE (born 5 April 1953 in Wolverhampton, Staffordshire) is a female British, Commonwealth and European medal winning English 400 metres runner and is now the manager of the British athletics team for people with learning disability.

== Athletics career ==
Bernard finished third behind Jannette Roscoe in the 400 metres event at the 1971 WAAA Championships and then became the British 400 metres champion after winning the British WAAA Championships title at the 1972 WAAA Championships.

Shortly afterwards, Bernard made her debut on the international stage at the 1972 Summer Olympics in Munich taking fifth place in the 4 × 400 m relay. The following year in 1973, she won the 400 m title at the European Indoor Championships in Rotterdam, ahead of the East Germans Waltraud Dietsch and Renate Siebach.

At the 1974 British Commonwealth Games, Bernard finished second in the 400 m and won the 4 × 400 m relay and won a gold medal in the women's 4 × 400 metres relay event with Jannette Roscoe, Ruth Kennedy and Sue Pettett. Later that year Bernard married Hugh Elder and competed under her married name thereafter.

Elder retained her European indoor title at the European Indoor Championships in 1975 in Katowice and regained her WAAA title at the 1976 WAAA Championships and 1977 WAAA Championships.

She won a silver medal in the 400 metres, at the 1978 Commonwealth Games in Edmonton, Alberta, Canada. She was a Finalist in the 400 m and 800 m at the European Championships in 1978. At the start of 1979 season she won gold at the indoor European Indoor Championships in Vienna, Austria, ahead of Jarmila Kratochvílová.

She also represented England in the 400 metres hurdles event, at the 1982 Commonwealth Games in Brisbane, Queensland, Australia.

== Coaching career ==
She was a member of the Wolverhampton & Bilston club, Staffordshire. She went on to teach sport to people with learning disability at Thurrock College, Essex. She led Great Britain to six gold, six silver and three bronze medals at the 7th International Sports Federation for Persons with Intellectual Disability (INAS) World Indoor Championships for athletes with learning disabilities as the team manager. With GB finishing second in the medal table behind Portugal at Manchester Sport City. She was Chef de Mission to the 2011 INAS Global Games in Italy on 24 September – 4 October 2011.
