= Lyudmila Aksyonova =

Soviet sprinter

Medal record

Women's athletics

Representing the Soviet Union

Olympic Games
Bronze medal – third place	1976 Montreal	4×400 m

European Indoor Championships
Gold medal – first place	1971 Sofia	4×200 m
Gold medal – first place	1971 Sofia	4×400 m
Gold medal – first place	1975 Katowice	4×320 m
Silver medal – second place	1972 Grenoble	4×360 m

Lyudmila Vasilyevna Shapovalova-Aksyonova (Russian: Людмила Васильевна Аксёнова; also transliterated Aksenova, born 23 April 1947 in Sevastopol) is a Soviet athlete who competed mainly in the 400 metres, training at VSS Avanhard in Kyiv.

She competed for Soviet Union in the 1976 Summer Olympics held in Montreal, Quebec, Canada in the 4 × 400 metres where she won the bronze medal with her teammates Inta Kļimoviča, Natalya Sokolova and Nadezhda Ilyina.
