= Natalya Sokolova (sprinter) =

Soviet sprinter

Personal information
- Born: 6 October 1949 (age 76) Moscow, Soviet Union

Sport
- Sport: Track and field
Medal record
Representing Soviet Union
Olympic Games
Bronze medal – third place	1976 Montreal	4x400 m
European Championships
Bronze medal – third place	1974 Rome	4x400 m
Summer Universiade
Silver medal – second place	1977 Sofia	400 m

Natalya Dmitriyevna Sokolova (Russian: Наталья Дмитриевна Соколова; née Куличкова, Kulichkova; born 6 October 1949 in Moscow) is a Soviet athlete who competed mainly in the 400 metres.

Sokolova trained at Dynamo in Moscow. She competed for the USSR in the 1976 Summer Olympics held in Montreal, Canada in the 4 x 400 metres where she won the bronze medal with her teammates Inta Kļimoviča, Lyudmila Aksyonova and Nadezhda Ilyina.
