= Pamela Jiles (athlete) =

American sprinter

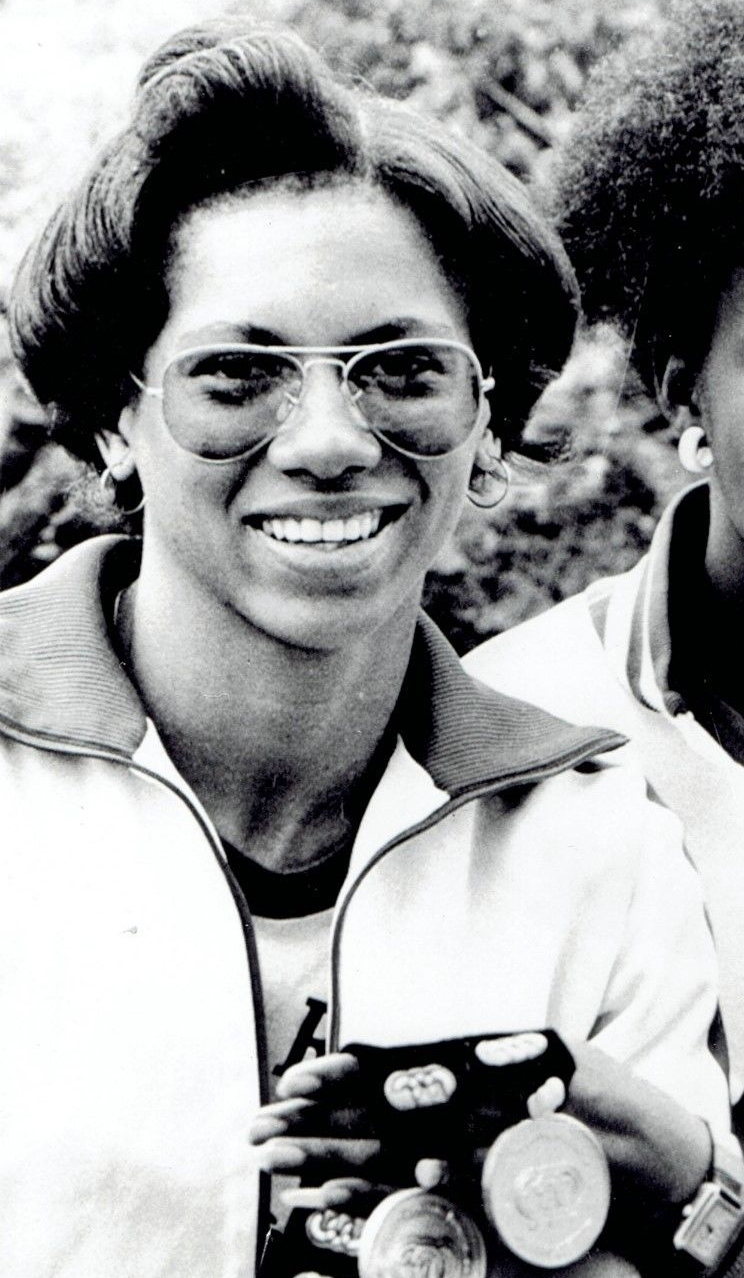
- Jiles at the 1975 Pan American Games

Personal information
- Full name: Pamela Theresa Jiles
- Born: July 10, 1955 (age 70) New Orleans, Louisiana, U.S.
- Height: 168 cm (5 ft 6 in)
- Weight: 63 kg (139 lb)

Sport
- Sport: Athletics
- Event: Sprint
- Club: Dillard University; New Orleans Super Dames; Louisiana State University

Achievements and titles
- Personal best(s): 100 m – 11.31 (1976); 200 m – 22.81 (1975); 400 m – 52.64 (1977)
Medal record
Representing United States
Olympic Games
Silver medal – second place	1976 Montreal	4 × 400 m
Pan American Games
Gold medal – first place	1975 Mexico City	100 m
Gold medal – first place	1975 Mexico City	4×100 m
Silver medal – second place	1975 Mexico City	200 m

Pamela Theresa "Pam" Jiles (born July 10, 1955) is a retired American sprinter. She won two gold and two silver medals at the 1975 Pan American and 1976 Olympic Games.
