= Margaret Stride =

Canadian sprinter

Personal information
- Nationality: Canadian
- Born: 21 December 1954 (age 71) Simcoe, Ontario, Canada

Sport
- Sport: Sprinting
- Event: 400 metres
Medal record
Representing Canada
Pan American Games
Gold medal – first place	1975 Mexico City	4x400m relay
Commonwealth Games
Bronze medal – third place	1974 Christchurch	4x400m relay
Bronze medal – third place	1978 Edmonton	4x400m relay

Margaret Stride (née MacGowan; born 21 December 1954) is a Canadian sprinter. She competed in the women's 400 metres at the 1976 Summer Olympics. She won a gold medal in the 1975 Pan American Games 4 × 400 metres relay (with Joyce Sadowick, Rachelle Campbell and Joanne McTaggart). At the 1975 Pan American Games Stride, while competing under her maiden name McGowen, finished sixth in the 400 metres. She also won bronze medals in the 4 x 400 metres relay at the 1974 British Commonwealth Games and 1978 Commonwealth Games.
