= 1978 in the sport of athletics =

1978 in athletics

In 1978, the foremost international competitions in the sport of athletics were the 1978 IAAF World Cross Country Championships and the 1978 European Athletics Championships. High-profile athletics competitions were also held at the 1978 Commonwealth Games, the 1978 All-Africa Games and the 1978 Asian Games.

Among the most prominent athletes that year was Kenya's Henry Rono who, in the space of 81 days, broke four world records: the 10,000 m (27:22.5), the 5000 m (13:08.4), the 3000 m steeplechase (8:05.4), and the 3000 m (7:32.1). In the course of the season East German Marita Koch also broke a world record four times, running 22.06 for the 200 m and breaking the 400 m three times, concluding the run with a time of 48.94 to win the European title.

== Major events ==
=== World ===
- World Cross Country Championships
- 1978 World Military Track and Field Championships
- 1978 Commonwealth Games

=== Regional ===
- 1978 All-Africa Games
- 1978 Asian Games
- 1978 Balkan Athletics Championships
- 1978 CARIFTA Games
- 1978 Central American and Caribbean Games
- 1978 Central American and Caribbean Junior Championships in Athletics
- 1978 European Athletics Championships
- 1978 European Athletics Indoor Championships
- 1978 European Champion Clubs Cup
- 1978 South American Junior Championships in Athletics
- 1978 South American Youth Championships in Athletics
- 1978 Southern Cross Games

=== National ===
- 1978 Italian Athletics Championships
- 1978 NCAA Division I Outdoor Track and Field Championships
- 1978 NCAA Division I Cross Country Championships
- 1978 NCAA Indoor Track and Field Championships
- 1978 UK Athletics Championships
- 1978 USA Outdoor Track and Field Championships
- 1978 USA–USSR Track and Field Dual Meet

=== Marathons ===
- 1978 Avon International Marathon
- 1978 Berlin Marathon
- 1978 Chicago Marathon
- 1978 New York City Marathon

== World records ==
=== Men ===
Event	Performance	Athlete	Nation	Meeting	Place	Date
3000 m	7:32.1	Henry Rono	Kenya		Oslo	1978-06-27
5000 m	13:08.4	Henry Rono	Kenya		Berkeley	1978-04-08
10,000 m	27:22.47	Henry Rono	Kenya		Vienna	1978-06-11
3000 m steeplechase	8:05.4	Henry Rono	Kenya		Seattle	1978-05-13
High jump	2.34	Vladimir Yashchenko	Soviet Union		Tbilisi	1978-06-16
Pole vault	5.71	Mike Tully	United States		Corvallis	1978-05-19
Discus throw	71.16	Wolfgang Schmidt	East Germany		Berlin	1978-08-09
Hammer throw	80.32	Karl-Hans Riehm	West Germany		Heidenheim	1978-08-06
Hammer throw	80.14	Boris Zaitchouk	Soviet Union		Moscow	1978-07-09

=== Women ===
Event	Performance	Athlete	Nation	Meeting	Place	Date
200 m	22.06	Marita Koch	East Germany		Erfurt	1978-05-28
400 m	48.94	Marita Koch	East Germany	1978 European Athletics Championships	Prague	1978-08-31
400 m	49.03	Marita Koch	East Germany		Potsdam	1978-08-19
400 m	49.19	Marita Koch	East Germany		Leipzig	1978-07-02
100 m hurdles	12.48	Grażyna Rabsztyn	Poland		Fürth	1978-06-10
400 m hurdles	54.89	Tatyana Zelentsova	Soviet Union	1978 European Athletics Championships	Prague	1978-09-02
4 × 100 metres relay	42.27	Johanna Klier; Monika Hamann; Carla Bodendorf; Marlies Göhr	East Germany		Potsdam	1978-08-19
High jump	2.01	Sara Simeoni	Italy		Brescia	1978-08-04
High jump	2.01	Sara Simeoni	Italy	1978 European Athletics Championships	Prague	1978-08-31
Long jump	7.09	Vilma Bardauskienė	Soviet Union	1978 European Athletics Championships	Prague	1978-08-29
Long jump	7.07	Vilma Bardauskienė	Soviet Union		Kishinyov	1978-08-18
Discus throw	70.72	Evelin Jahl	East Germany		Dresden	1978-08-12

== Season's bests ==
Best marks of the year
Event	Men			Women		
Event	Athlete	Mark	Notes	Athlete	Mark	Notes
100 metres	Clancy Edwards (USA) Eddie Hart (USA) Steve Williams (USA)	10.07		Marlies Göhr (GDR)	10.94	
200 metres	Clancy Edwards (USA)	20.03		Marita Koch (GDR)	22.06	WR
400 metres	Alberto Juantorena (CUB)	44.27		Marita Koch (GDR)	48.94	WR
800 metres	Olaf Beyer (GDR)	1:43.84		Tatyana Providokhina (URS)	1:55.80	
1500 metres	David Moorcroft (GBR)	3:35.48		Giana Romanova (URS)	3:59.01	
Mile run	Thomas Wessinghage (FRG)	3:52.50		Grete Waitz (NOR)	4:26.90	
3000 metres	Henry Rono (KEN)	7:32.1	WR	Grete Waitz (NOR)	8:32.1	
5000 metres	Henry Rono (KEN)	13:08.4	WR	—		
10,000 metres	Henry Rono (KEN)	27:22.47	WR	—		
Marathon	Shigeru So (JPN)	2:09:05.6		Julie Brown (USA)	2:36:23.1	
100/110 metres hurdles	Greg Foster (USA)	13.22		Grażyna Rabsztyn (POL)	12.48	WR
400 metres hurdles	Edwin Moses (USA)	47.94		Tatyana Zelentsova (URS)	54.89	
3000 metres steeplechase	Henry Rono (KEN)	8:05.4		—		
High jump	Vladimir Yashchenko (URS)	2.34 m		Sara Simeoni (ITA)	2.01 m	WR
Pole vault	Mike Tully (USA)	5.71 m	WR	—		
Long jump	Nenad Stekić (YUG)	8.32 m		Vilma Bardauskienė (URS)	7.09 m	WR
Triple jump	João Carlos de Oliveira (BRA)	17.44 m		—		
Shot put	Udo Beyer (GDR)	22.15 m		Ilona Slupianek (GDR)	22.06 m	
Discus throw	Wolfgang Schmidt (GDR)	71.16 m	WR	Evelin Jahl (GDR)	70.72 m	WR
Hammer throw	Karl-Hans Riehm (FRG)	80.32 m	WR	—		
Javelin throw	Michael Wessing (FRG)	94.22 m		Ruth Fuchs (GDR)	69.16 m	
Decathlon	Guido Kratschmer (FRG)	8493 pts		—		
4 × 100 metres relay	Tobias Striders; Guy Abrahams (PAN); Michael Simmons (USA); Don Quarrie (JAM); James Gilkes (GUY)	38.55		East Germany; Johanna Klier; Monika Hamann; Carla Bodendorf; Marlies Göhr	42.27	WR
4 × 400 metres relay	West Germany; Martin Weppler; Franz-Peter Hofmeister; Bernd Herrmann; Harald Schmid	3:02.03		East Germany; Christiane Marquardt; Barbara Krug; Christina Lathan; Marita Koch	3:21.20	
