= List of world under-23 bests in athletics =

World U-23 bests in the sport of athletics are the all-time best marks set in competition by aged 22 or younger throughout the entire calendar year of the performance. Technically, in all under-23 age divisions, the age is calculated "on December 31 of the year of competition" to avoid age group switching during a competitive season. World Athletics doesn't maintain an official list for such performances. All bests shown on this list are tracked by statisticians not officially sanctioned by the governing body.

== Outdoor ==
=== Men ===
Event	Record	Athlete	Nationality	Date	Meet	Place	Age	Ref.
100 m	9.69 (±0.0 m/s)	Usain Bolt	Jamaica	16 August 2008	Olympic Games	Beijing, China	21 years, 361 days	
150 m	14.96 (±0.0 m/s)	Gout Gout	Australia	16 June 2026	Golden Spike Ostrava	Ostrava, Czech Republic	18 years, 169 days	
200 m	19.26 (+0.7 m/s)	Yohan Blake	Jamaica	16 September 2011	Memorial Van Damme	Brussels, Belgium	21 years, 264 days	
300 m	30.69 A	Letsile Tebogo	Botswana	17 February 2024	Simbine Curro Classic Shoot-Out	Pretoria, South Africa	20 years, 255 days	
400 m	43.45	Michael Norman	United States	20 April 2019	Mt. SAC Relays	Torrance, United States	21 years, 138 days	
600 m	1:13.80	Earl Jones	United States	24 May 1986		Santa Monica, United States	21 years, 311 days	
800 m	1:41.01	David Rudisha	Kenya	29 August 2010	Rieti Meeting	Rieti, Italy	21 years, 255 days	
1000 m	2:11.83	Emmanuel Wanyonyi	Kenya	10 July 2026	Herculis	Fontvieille, Monaco	21 years, 343 days	
1500 m	3:27.72	Phanuel Koech	Kenya	20 June 2025	Meeting de Paris	Paris, France	18 years, 201 days	
Mile	3:43.40	Noah Ngeny	Kenya	7 July 1999	Golden Gala (an IAAF Golden League event)	Rome, Italy	20 years, 247 days	
Mile (road)	3:52.45	Emmanuel Wanyonyi	Kenya	26 April 2025	Adizero: Road to Records	Herzogenaurach, Germany	20 years, 268 days	
2000 m	4:48.14	Reynold Cheruiyot	Kenya	8 September 2023	Memorial Van Damme	Brussels, Belgium	19 years, 40 days	
3000 m	7:20.67	Daniel Komen	Kenya	1 September 1996	Rieti Meeting	Rieti, Italy	20 years, 107 days	
5000 m	12:37.35	Kenenisa Bekele	Ethiopia	31 May 2004	Fanny Blankers-Koen Games	Hengelo, Netherlands	21 years, 353 days	
5 km (road)	12:49	Berihu Aregawi	Ethiopia	31 December 2021	Cursa dels Nassos	Barcelona, Spain	20 years, 306 days	
10,000 m	26:20.31	Kenenisa Bekele	Ethiopia	8 June 2004	Golden Spike Ostrava	Ostrava, Czech Republic	21 years, 361 days	
10 km (road)	26:24	Rhonex Kipruto	Kenya	12 January 2020	10k Valencia Ibercaja	Valencia, Spain	20 years, 105 days	
Half marathon	57:31	Jacob Kiplimo	Uganda	21 November 2021	Lisbon Half Marathon	Lisbon, Portugal	21 years, 7 days	
Marathon	2:03:24	Tadese Takele	Ethiopia	24 September 2023	Berlin Marathon	Berlin, Germany	21 years, 52 days	
110 m hurdles	12.87 (+0.9 m/s)	Dayron Robles	Cuba	6 June 2008	Golden Spike Ostrava	Ostrava, Czech Republic	20 years, 200 days	
300 m hurdles	34.83	Vance Nilsson	United States	11 May 2024	AIA State Championships	Mesa, United States	18 years, 186 days	
400 m hurdles	46.29	Alison dos Santos	Brazil	19 July 2022	World Championships	Eugene, United States	22 years, 46 days	
3000 m steeplechase	7:53.63	Saif Saaeed Shaheen	Qatar	3 September 2004	Memorial Van Damme	Brussels, Belgium	21 years, 324 days	
High jump	2.44 m	Javier Sotomayor	Cuba	29 July 1989	CAC Championships	San Juan, Puerto Rico	21 years, 289 days	
Pole vault	6.15 m	Armand Duplantis	Sweden	17 September 2020	Golden Gala	Rome, Italy	20 years, 312 days	
Long jump	8.90 m A (+2.0 m/s)	Bob Beamon	United States	18 October 1968	Olympic Games	Mexico City, Mexico	22 years, 50 days	
Triple jump	18.08 m (±0.0 m/s)	Pedro Pablo Pichardo	Cuba	28 May 2015	Copa Cuba-Memorial Barrientos	Havana, Cuba	21 years, 332 days	
Shot put	22.42 m	Randy Barnes	United States	17 August 1988	Weltklasse Zürich	Zürich, Switzerland	22 years, 62 days	
Discus throw	74.35 m	Mykolas Alekna	Lithuania	14 April 2024	Oklahoma Throws Series World Invitational	Ramona, United States	21 years, 200 days	
Hammer throw	84.38 m	Ethan Katzberg	Canada	20 April 2024	Kip Keino Classic	Nairobi, Kenya	22 years, 15 days	
Javelin throw	90.20 m	Max Dehning	Germany	25 February 2024	German Winter Throwing Championships	Halle, Germany	19 years, 169 days	
Decathlon	8706 pts	Frank Busemann	Germany	1 August 1996	Olympic Games	Atlanta, United States	21 years, 157 days	
Decathlon	100m (wind) / Long jump (wind) / Shot put / High jump / 400m / 110m H (wind) / Discus / Pole vault / Javelin / 1500m; 10.60 (+0.7 m/s) / 8.07 m (+0.8 m/s) / 13.60 m / 2.04 m / 48.34 / 13.47 (+0.3 m/s) / 45.04 m / 4.80 m / 66.86 m / 4:31.41							
5000 m walk (track)	18:40.37	Isaac Beacroft	Australia	8 August 2026	World U20 Championships	Eugene, United States	19 years, 21 days	
10,000 m walk (track)	37:25.90	Koki Ikeda	Japan	14 November 2020	Juntendo University Long Distance Meeting	Inzai, Japan	22 years, 195 days	
20 km walk (road)	1:17:16	Vladimir Kanaykin	Russia	29 September 2007	IAAF Race Walking Challenge	Saransk, Russia	22 years, 192 days	
20 km walk (road)	1:16:43 #	Sergey Morozov	Russia	8 June 2008	Russian Championships	Saransk, Russia	20 years, 79 days	
50 km walk (road)	3:38:58	Mikhail Ryzhov	Russia	14 August 2013	World Championships	Moscow, Russia	21 years, 240 days	
4 × 100 m relay	37.68	Ackeem Blake; Oblique Seville; Ryiem Forde; Rohan Watson	Jamaica	25 August 2023	World Championships	Budapest, Hungary	21 years, 216 days 22 years, 162 days 22 years, 94 days 21 years, 118 days	
4 × 400 m relay	2:56.16 A	Vince Matthews; Ron Freeman; Larry James; Lee Evans	United States	20 October 1968	Olympic Games	Mexico City, Mexico	20 years, 309 days 21 years, 130 days 20 years, 349 days 21 years, 238 days	

=== Women ===
Event	Record	Athlete	Nationality	Date	Meet	Place	Age	Ref.
100 m	10.63 (+1.9 m/s)	Adaejah Hodge	British Virgin Islands	11 June 2026	NCAA Division I Championships	Eugene, United States	20 years, 82 days	
150 m (straight)	16.30 (±0.0 m/s)	Favour Ofili	Nigeria	18 May 2024	Atlanta City Games	Atlanta, United States	21 years, 139 days	
200 m	21.68 (−0.4 m/s)	Adaejah Hodge	British Virgin Islands	13 June 2026	NCAA Division I Championships	Eugene, United States	20 years, 84 days	
300 m	34.60 A	Beatrice Masilingi	Namibia	18 February 2023	Curro Simbine Classic Shoot Out	Pretoria, South Africa	19 years, 314 days	
400 m	48.14	Salwa Eid Naser	Bahrain	3 October 2019	World Championships	Doha, Qatar	21 years, 133 days	
600 m	1:22.74	Athing Mu	United States	30 April 2022	Penn Relays	Philadelphia, United States	19 years, 326 days	
800 m	1:54.01	Pamela Jelimo	Kenya	29 August 2008	Weltklasse Zürich	Zürich, Switzerland	18 years, 268 days	
1000 m	2:30.85	Martina Kämpfert	East Germany	9 July 1980		East Berlin, East Germany	20 years, 241 days	
1500 m	3:50.46	Qu Yunxia	China	11 September 1993	Chinese National Games	Beijing, China	20 years, 260 days	
Mile	4:14.79	Freweyni Hailu	Ethiopia	21 July 2023	Herculis	Fontvieille, Monaco	22 years, 159 days	
Mile (road)	4:20.98 Wo	Diribe Welteji	Ethiopia	1 October 2023	World Road Running Championships	Riga, Latvia	21 years, 141 days	
2000 m	5:25.86	Freweyni Hailu	Ethiopia	14 September 2021	Hanžeković Memorial	Zagreb, Croatia	20 years, 214 days	
3000 m	8:06.11	Wang Junxia	China	13 September 1993	Chinese National Games	Beijing, China	20 years, 247 days	
Two miles	9:17.75	Jane Hedengren	United States	8 June 2025	Brooks PR Invitational	Renton, United States	18 years, 258 days	
5000 m	14:06.62	Letesenbet Gidey	Ethiopia	7 October 2020		Valencia, Spain	22 years, 201 days	
5 km (road)	14:15 Mx	Marta Alemayo	Ethiopia	4 April 2026	Urban Trail de Lille	Lille, France	17 years, 361 days	
5 km (road)	14:25+ Wo	Agnes Ngetich	Kenya	10 September 2023	Brașov Running Festival	Brașov, Romania	22 years, 230 days	
10,000 m	29:31.78	Wang Junxia	China	8 September 1993	Chinese National Games	Beijing, China	20 years, 242 days	
10 km (road)	29:25 Mx	Medina Eisa	Ethiopia	16 February 2025	10K Facsa Castellón	Castellón de la Plana, Spain	20 years, 44 days	
10 km (road)	29:26 Wo	Agnes Ngetich	Kenya	18 November 2023	Urban Trail de Lille	Lille, France	22 years, 299 days	
10 km (road)	29:24 Wo (Note: Ngetich's women's-only record was not certified after World Athletics determined the course was 25 meters too short.)	Agnes Ngetich	Kenya	10 September 2023	Brașov Running Festival	Brașov, Romania	22 years, 230 days	
10 miles (road)	50:37	Asayech Ayichew	Ethiopia	12 April 2026	Cherry Blossom Ten Mile Run	Washington, D.C., United States	21 years, 9 days	
Half marathon	1:03:51	Yalemzerf Yehualaw	Ethiopia	24 October 2021	Valencia Half Marathon	Valencia, Spain	22 years, 82 days	
Marathon	2:17:36	Tadu Teshome	Ethiopia	4 December 2022	Valencia Marathon	Valencia, Spain	21 years, 178 days	
100 m hurdles	12.24 (−0.4 m/s)	Ackera Nugent	Jamaica	30 August 2024	Golden Gala	Rome, Italy	22 years, 123 days	
200 m hurdles (straight)	24.86 (+0.1 m/s)	Shiann Salmon	Jamaica	23 May 2021	Adidas Boost Boston Games	Boston, United States	22 years, 53 days	
300 m hurdles	36.86	Femke Bol	Netherlands	31 May 2022	Golden Spike Ostrava	Ostrava, Czech Republic	22 years, 97 days	
400 m hurdles	51.90	Sydney McLaughlin	United States	27 June 2021	US Olympic Trials	Eugene, United States	21 years, 354 days	
Mile steeplechase	4:52.10	Celestine Jepkosgei Biwot	Kenya	22 August 2025	Memorial Van Damme	Brussels, Belgium	21 years, 241 days	
3000 m steeplechase	8:52.78	Ruth Jebet	Bahrain	27 August 2016	Meeting Areva	Saint-Denis, France	19 years, 284 days	
High jump	2.09 m	Stefka Kostadinova	Bulgaria	30 August 1987	World Championships	Rome, Italy	22 years, 158 days	
Pole vault	4.94 m	Eliza McCartney	New Zealand	17 July 2018	Jockgrim Stabhochsprung-Meeting	Jockgrim, Germany	21 years, 218 days	
Long jump	7.45 m (+0.9 m/s)	Heike Drechsler	East Germany	21 June 1986		Tallinn, Soviet Union	21 years, 187 days	
Triple jump	14.91 m (+0.4 m/s)	Yulimar Rojas	Venezuela	7 August 2017	World Championships	Florence, Italy	21 years, 290 days	
Shot put	22.53 m	Natalya Lisovskaya	Soviet Union	27 May 1984		Sochi, Soviet Union	21 years, 316 days	
Discus throw	74.56 m	Ilke Wyludda	East Germany	23 July 1989		Neubrandenburg, East Germany	20 years, 117 days	
Hammer throw	77.24 m	Zhang Jiale	China	2 August 2025	Chinese Championships	Quzhou, China	18 years, 284 days	
Javelin throw	71.74 m	Yan Ziyi	China	23 May 2026	Xiamen Diamond League	Xiamen, China	18 years, 1 day	
Heptathlon	7001 pts	Carolina Klüft	Sweden	24 August 2003	World Championships	Paris, France	20 years, 203 days	
Heptathlon	100m H (wind) / High jump / Shot put / 200m (wind) / Long jump (wind) / Javelin / 800m; 13.18 (−0.4 m/s) / 1.94 m / 14.19 m / 22.98 (+1.1 m/s) / 6.68 m (+1.0 m/s) / 49.90 m / 2:12.12							
5000 m walk	20:07.52	Beate Anders	East Germany	23 June 1990		Rostock, East Germany	22 years, 139 days	
5 km walk	20:05	Olga Polyakova	Russia	28 May 2000		Saransk, Russia	19 years, 248 days	
20,000 m walk (track)	1:29:32.4	Hongjuan Song	China	23 October 2003	Changsha Chinese Urban Games	Changsha, China	19 years, 111 days	
20 km walk (road)	1:25:02	Elena Lashmanova	Russia	11 August 2012	Olympic Games	London, United Kingdom	20 years, 124 days	
35 km walk (road)	2:42:40	Olivia Sandery	Australia	16 March 2025	World Athletics Race Walking Tour	Nomi, Japan	22 years, 53 days	
4 × 100 m relay	42.05	Mikiah Brisco; Kortnei Johnson; Rachel Misher; Aleia Hobbs	United States (LSU Lady Tigers)	13 May 2018	SEC Championships	Knoxville, United States	21 years, 303 days 20 years, 275 days 21 years, 98 days 22 years, 78 days	
4 × 400 m relay	3:21.20	Christiane Marquardt; Barbara Krug; Christina Brehmer; Marita Koch	East Germany	3 September 1978	European Championships	Prague, Czech Republic	19 years, 294 days 22 years, 120 days 20 years, 187 days 21 years, 197 days	

== Indoor ==
=== Men ===
Event	Record	Athlete	Nationality	Date	Meet	Place	Age	Ref.
60 m	6.34 A	Christian Coleman	United States	18 February 2018	USA Championships	Albuquerque, United States	21 years, 349 days	
200 m	20.10	Wallace Spearmon	United States	24 March 2005	NCAA Division I Championships	Fayetteville, United States	20 years, 90 days	
300 m	31.87 A	Noah Lyles	United States	4 March 2017	USA Championships	Albuquerque, United States	19 years, 229 days	
400 m	44.49 (Note: Starting blocks did not comply with World Athletics regulations, athlete passed drug test on the day)	Christopher Morales Williams	Canada	24 February 2024	SEC Championships	Fayetteville, United States	19 years, 203 days	
500 m	59.87 (Note: not ratified by USATF)	Brian Herron	United States	3 December 2022	Commonwealth College Opener	Louisville, United States	22 years, 9 days	
500 m	59.82 (Note: not ratified by USATF; time was rejected as a record due to an incorrectly measured track)	Roddie Haley	United States	15 March 1986	NCAA Division I Championships	Oklahoma City, United States	21 years, 99 days	
600 y	1:06.93	Moitalel Naadokila	Kenya	15 February 2020	Texas Tech Shootout	Lubbock, United States	19 years, 7 days	
600 m	1:13.77	Donavan Brazier	United States	24 February 2019	USA Championships	Staten Island, United States	21 years, 325 days	
800 m	1:44.03	Cooper Lutkenhaus	United States	14 February 2026	Sound Invite	Winston-Salem, United States	17 years, 57 days	
1000 m	2:15.26	Noureddine Morceli	Algeria	22 February 1992	Indoor Meeting Karlsruhe	Birmingham, United Kingdom	21 years, 359 days	
1500 m	3:30.60	Jakob Ingebrigtsen	Norway	17 February 2022	Meeting Hauts-de-France Pas-de-Calais	Liévin, France	21 years, 151 days	
2000 m	4:56.30	Augustine Kiprono Choge	Kenya	9 February 2007	Aubiére International Meeting	Aubiére, France	20 years, 19 days	
3000 m	7:24.90	Daniel Komen	Kenya	6 February 1998	Budapest Samsung Cup	Budapest, Hungary	21 years, 265 days	
5000 m	12:49.60	Kenenisa Bekele	Ethiopia	20 February 2004	Birmingham Norwich Union Indoor GP	Birmingham, United Kingdom	21 years, 252 days	
55 m hurdles	6.89	Renaldo Nehemiah	United States	20 January 1979		New York City, United States	19 years, 302 days	
60 m hurdles	7.33	Dayron Robles	Cuba	8 February 2008	PSD Bank Meeting	Düsseldorf, Germany	21 years, 81 days	
300 m hurdles	34.26 OT ^{[WB]}	Karsten Warholm	Norway	10 February 2018	Avoimet Pirkanmaan	Tampere, Finland	21 years, 347 days	
High jump	2.43 m	Javier Sotomayor	Cuba	4 March 1989	World Championships	Budapest, Hungary	21 years, 142 days	
Pole vault	6.18 m	Armand Duplantis	Sweden	15 February 2020	Müller Indoor Grand Prix	Glasgow, United Kingdom	20 years, 97 days	
Long jump	8.56 m	Carl Lewis	United States	16 January 1982		East Rutherford, United States	20 years, 199 days	
Triple jump	17.92 m (2nd jump)	Teddy Tamgho	France	6 March 2011	European Championships	Paris, France	21 years, 264 days	
Triple jump	17.92 m (4th jump)	Teddy Tamgho	France	6 March 2011	European Championships	Paris, France	21 years, 264 days	
Shot put	22.00 m	Konrad Bukowiecki	Poland	15 February 2018	Copernicus Cup	Toruń, Poland	20 years, 335 days	
Weight throw	25.66 m	Ryan Johnson	United States	27 February 2026	Big Ten Conference Championships	Indianapolis, United States	21 years, 32 days	
Heptathlon	6499 pts	Ashton Eaton	United States	12–13 March 2010	NCAA Division I Championships	Fayetteville, United States	22 years, 51 days	
Heptathlon	60m / Long jump / Shot put / High jump / 60m H / Pole vault / 1000m							
3000 m walk	10:52.77	Callum Wilkinson	Great Britain	25 February 2018	Müller Indoor Grand Prix	Glasgow, United Kingdom	20 years, 348 days	
5000 m walk	18:15.91	Mikhail Shchennikov	Soviet Union	4 February 1989		Gomel, USSR	21 years, 42 days	
4 × 400 m relay	3:01.39	Ilolo Izu; Robert Grant; Devin Dixon; My'Lik Kerley	United States (Texas A&M Aggies)	10 March 2018	NCAA Division I Championships	College Station, United States	20 years, 286 days 22 years, 38 days 20 years, 169 days 21 years, 277 days	

=== Women ===
Event	Record	Athlete	Nationality	Date	Meet	Place	Age	Ref.
60 m	6.94 A	Julien Alfred	Saint Lucia	11 March 2023	NCAA Division I Championships	Albuquerque, United States	21 years, 274 days	
200 m	22.01 A	Julien Alfred	Saint Lucia	11 March 2023	NCAA Division I Championships	Albuquerque, United States	21 years, 274 days	
300 m	35.80	Abby Steiner	United States	11 December 2021	Cardinal Classic	Louisville, United States	22 years, 17 days	
400 m	49.76	Taťána Kocembová	Czechoslovakia	2 February 1984		Vienna, Austria	21 years, 276 days	
600 y	1:16.76 A	Michaela Rose	United States	20 January 2024	Corky Classic	Lubbock, United States	20 years, 221 days	
600 m	1:23.41	Keely Hodgkinson	Great Britain	28 January 2023	Manchester World Indoor Tour	Manchester, United Kingdom	20 years, 331 days	
800 m	1:57.20	Keely Hodgkinson	Great Britain	19 February 2022	Birmingham Indoor Grand Prix	Birmingham, United Kingdom	19 years, 353 days	
1000 m	2:34.8 h	Brigitte Kraus	West Germany	19 February 1978		Dortmund, West Germany	21 years, 191 days	
1500 m	3:55.47	Diribe Welteji	Ethiopia	6 February 2024	Copernicus Cup	Toruń, Spain	21 years, 269 days	
2000 m	5:35.46	Dawit Seyaum	Ethiopia	7 February 2015	New Balance Indoor Grand Prix	Boston, United States	18 years, 195 days	
3000 m	8:23.74	Meselech Melkamu	Ethiopia	3 February 2007	Sparkassen Cup	Stuttgart, Germany	21 years, 290 days	
Two miles	9:07.12	Melknat Wudu	Ethiopia	11 February 2024	Millrose Games	New York City, United States	19 years, 39 days	
Two miles	9:04.39 (Note: later disqualified due to lane infringement)	Medina Eisa	Ethiopia	11 February 2024	Millrose Games	New York City, United States	19 years, 39 days	
5000 m	14:27.42	Tirunesh Dibaba	Ethiopia	27 January 2007	Reebok Indoor Games	Boston, United States	21 years, 240 days	
60 m hurdles	7.72 A	Ackera Nugent	Jamaica	10 March 2023	NCAA Division I Championships	Albuquerque, United States	20 years, 315 days	
High jump	2.06 m	Yaroslava Mahuchikh	Ukraine	2 February 2021	Banskobystricka latka	Banská Bystrica, Slovakia	19 years, 136 days	
Pole vault	4.91 m	Amanda Moll	United States	28 February 2025	Big 10 Championships	Indiananpolis, United States	20 years, 28 days	
Long jump	7.29 m	Heike Drechsler	East Germany	25 January 1986		Berlin, Germany	21 years, 40 days	
Triple jump	15.12 m A	Jasmine Moore	United States	11 March 2023	NCAA Division I Championships	Albuquerque, United States	21 years, 314 days	
Shot put	21.12 m	Ilona Slupianek	East Germany	13 March 1977	European Championships	San Sebastián, Spain	20 years, 170 days	
Weight throw	25.56 m	Brittany Riley	United States	10 March 2007		Fayetteville, United States	20 years, 196 days	
Pentathlon	5004 pts A	Anna Hall	United States	18 February 2023	USA Championships	Albuquerque, United States	21 years, 332 days	
Pentathlon	60m H / High jump / Shot put / Long jump / 800m; 8.04 / 1.91 m / 13.80 m / 6.34 m / 2:05.70							
1500 m walk	6:02.85+	Taylor Ewert	United States	9 February 2019	Millrose Games	New York City United States	17 years, 80 days	
Mile walk	6:28.21	Taylor Ewert	United States	9 February 2019	Millrose Games	New York City United States	17 years, 80 days	
3000 m walk	11:40.33	Claudia Iovan	Romania	30 January 1999		Bucharest, Romania	20 years, 339 days	
5000 m walk	20:23.2	Yekaterina Medvedeva	Russia	9 February 2016		Saransk, Russia	22 years, 276 days	
10,000 m walk	45:14.71	Alesia Savaneuskaya	Belarus	14 February 2025	Belarusian Championships	Mogilev, Belarus	19 years, 155 days	
4 × 400 m relay	3:26.68 (Note: Time would be rejected as a record as the team members are not of the same nationality)	Jania Martin; Charokee Young; Tierra Robinson-Jones; Athing Mu	United States; Jamaica; United States; United States (Texas A&M Aggies)	13 March 2021	NCAA Division I Championships	Fayetteville, United States	20 years, 308 days 20 years, 204 days 21 years, 111 days 18 years, 278 days	
4 × 400 m relay	3:27.42 A	Briana Nelson; Courtney Okolo; Kendall Baisden; Ashley Spencer	United States (Texas Longhorns)	15 March 2014	NCAA Division I Championships	Albuquerque, United States	21 years, 240 days 20 years, 0 days 19 years, 10 days 20 years, 280 days	
