= 1978 European Athletics Championships – Women's 400 metres =

Women's 400 metres at the European Athletics Championships
- Venue: Stadion Evžena Rošického
- Location: Prague, Czechoslovakia
- Dates: 29, 30, and 31 August 1978
- Competitors: 25 from 13 nations
- Winning time: 48.94 s WR

Medalists
| gold medal | Marita Koch | East Germany |
| silver medal | Christina Brehmer | East Germany |
| bronze medal | Irena Szewińska | Poland |

The women's 400 metres at the 1978 European Athletics Championships was held in Prague, then Czechoslovakia, at Stadion Evžena Rošického on 29, 30, and 31 August 1978.

== Results ==
=== Heats ===
29 August

==== Heat 1 ====
| Rank | Name | Nationality | Time | Notes |
|---|---|---|---|---|
| 1 | Marita Koch | East Germany | 52.95 | Q |
| 2 | Irena Szewińska | Poland | 53.14 | Q |
| 3 | Ilona Pál | Hungary | 53.42 | Q |
| 4 | Patricia Darbonville | France | 53.50 | q |
| 5 | Rosine Wallez | Belgium | 53.99 | |
| 6 | Anne Aren | Sweden | 54.37 | |

==== Heat 2 ====
| Rank | Name | Nationality | Time | Notes |
|---|---|---|---|---|
| 1 | Christiane Marquardt | East Germany | 52.12 | Q |
| 2 | Joslyn Hoyte | Great Britain | 52.29 | Q |
| 3 | Gaby Bussmann | West Germany | 52.92 | Q |
| 4 | Jarmila Kratochvílová | Czechoslovakia | 53.33 | q |
| 5 | Marina Sidorova | Soviet Union | 53.72 | q |
| 6 | Yvonne Hannus | Finland | 53.98 | |
| 7 | Ibolya Petrika | Hungary | 54.01 | |

==== Heat 3 ====
| Rank | Name | Nationality | Time | Notes |
|---|---|---|---|---|
| 1 | Christina Brehmer | East Germany | 51.71 | Q |
| 2 | Verona Elder | Great Britain | 52.64 | Q |
| 3 | Pirjo Häggman | Finland | 52.68 | Q |
| 4 | Elke Decker | West Germany | 52.97 | q |
| 5 | Catherine Delachanal | France | 53.81 | |
| 6 | Truus van Amstel | Netherlands | 54.37 | |

==== Heat 4 ====
| Rank | Name | Nationality | Time | Notes |
|---|---|---|---|---|
| 1 | Mariya Kulchunova | Soviet Union | 51.55 | Q |
| 2 | Dagmar Fuhrmann | West Germany | 53.45 | Q |
| 3 | Donna Hartley | Great Britain | 53.61 | Q |
| 4 | Silvia Schinzel | Austria | 53.80 | |
| 5 | Rozalia Halmosi | Hungary | 53.93 | |
| 6 | Eva Ráková | Czechoslovakia | 54.00 | |

=== Semi-finals ===
30 August

==== Semi-final 1 ====
| Rank | Name | Nationality | Time | Notes |
|---|---|---|---|---|
| 1 | Marita Koch | East Germany | 51.76 | Q |
| 2 | Mariya Kulchunova | Soviet Union | 51.88 | Q |
| 3 | Donna Hartley | Great Britain | 52.14 | Q |
| 4 | Pirjo Häggman | Finland | 52.24 | Q |
| 5 | Elke Decker | West Germany | 52.92 | |
| 6 | Joslyn Hoyte | Great Britain | 52.95 | |
| 7 | Jarmila Kratochvílová | Czechoslovakia | 53.93 | |
| 8 | Patricia Darbonville | France | 54.47 | |

==== Semi-final 2 ====
| Rank | Name | Nationality | Time | Notes |
|---|---|---|---|---|
| 1 | Christina Brehmer | East Germany | 52.01 | Q |
| 2 | Christiane Marquardt | East Germany | 52.29 | Q |
| 3 | Irena Szewińska | Poland | 52.37 | Q |
| 4 | Verona Elder | Great Britain | 52.65 | Q |
| 5 | Gaby Bussmann | West Germany | 52.66 | |
| 6 | Dagmar Fuhrmann | West Germany | 53.23 | |
| 7 | Ilona Pál | Hungary | 53.50 | |
| 8 | Marina Sidorova | Soviet Union | 54.08 | |

=== Final ===
31 August

| Rank | Name | Nationality | Time | Notes |
|---|---|---|---|---|
| 1st place, gold medalist(s) | Marita Koch | East Germany | 48.94 | WR |
| 2nd place, silver medalist(s) | Christina Brehmer | East Germany | 50.38 | |
| 3rd place, bronze medalist(s) | Irena Szewińska | Poland | 50.40 | |
| 4 | Mariya Kulchunova | Soviet Union | 51.25 | |
| 5 | Christiane Marquardt | East Germany | 51.99 | |
| 6 | Donna Hartley | Great Britain | 52.31 | |
| 7 | Pirjo Häggman | Finland | 52.46 | |
| 8 | Verona Elder | Great Britain | 52.53 | |
