= 1978 European Athletics Championships – Women's 800 metres =

Women's 800 metres at the European Athletics Championships

The women's 800 metres at the 1978 European Athletics Championships was held in Prague, then Czechoslovakia, at Stadion Evžena Rošického on 29, 30, and 31 August 1978.

== Medalists ==
Gold	Tatyana Providokhina; Soviet Union
Silver	Nadezhda Mushta; Soviet Union
Bronze	Zoya Rigel; Soviet Union

== Results ==
=== Final ===
31 August

Rank	Name	Nationality	Time	Notes
1st place, gold medalist(s)	Tatyana Providokhina	Soviet Union	1:55.80	CR
2nd place, silver medalist(s)	Nadezhda Mushta	Soviet Union	1:55.82	
3rd place, bronze medalist(s)	Zoya Rigel	Soviet Union	1:56.57	
4	Totka Petrova	Bulgaria	1:56.59	
5	Hildegard Ullrich	East Germany	1:57.45	AJR
6	Anita Weiß	East Germany	1:57.71	
7	Ulrike Bruns	East Germany	1:58.62	
8	Fiţa Lovin	Romania	1:58.82	

=== Semi-finals ===
30 August

==== Semi-final 1 ====
Rank	Name	Nationality	Time	Notes
1	Anita Weiß	East Germany	1:58.8	Q
2	Nadezhda Mushta	Soviet Union	1:58.8	Q
3	Fiţa Lovin	Romania	1:58.8	Q
4	Zoya Rigel	Soviet Union	1:58.9	Q
5	Gabriella Dorio	Italy	2:00.5	
6	Elena Tarita	Romania	2:01.7	
7	Anne-Marie Van Nuffel	Belgium	2:06.2	
8	Irén Lipcsei	Hungary	2:06.8	

==== Semi-final 2 ====
Rank	Name	Nationality	Time	Notes
1	Tatyana Providokhina	Soviet Union	2:00.06	Q
2	Totka Petrova	Bulgaria	2:00.2	Q
3	Ulrike Bruns	East Germany	2:00.3	Q
4	Hildegard Ullrich	East Germany	2:00.6	Q
5	Mariana Suman	Romania	2:01.62	
6	Liz Barnes	Great Britain	2:01.69	
7	Jane Colebrook	Great Britain	2:02.9	
8	Jozefína Čerchlanová	Czechoslovakia	2:07.0	

=== Heats ===
29 August

==== Heat 1 ====
Rank	Name	Nationality	Time	Notes
1	Tatyana Providokhina	Soviet Union	1:59.96	Q
2	Fiţa Lovin	Romania	2:00.0	Q
3	Ulrike Bruns	East Germany	2:00.38	Q
4	Gabriella Dorio	Italy	2:00.4	Q
5	Anne-Marie Van Nuffel	Belgium	2:01.3	Q
6	Jane Colebrook	Great Britain	2:03.0	q
7	Maria Ritter	Liechtenstein	2:09.0	

==== Heat 2 ====
Rank	Name	Nationality	Time	Notes
1	Hildegard Ullrich	East Germany	2:01.39	Q
2	Zoya Rigel	Soviet Union	2:01.6	Q
3	Totka Petrova	Bulgaria	2:01.8	Q
4	Irén Lipcsei	Hungary	2:02.3	Q
5	Elena Tarita	Romania	2:02.9	Q
6	Janet Prictoe	Great Britain	2:03.7	
7	Elly van Hulst	Netherlands	2:03.9	
8	Jindřiška Kubečková	Czechoslovakia	2:04.0	

==== Heat 3 ====
Rank	Name	Nationality	Time	Notes
1	Nadezhda Mushta	Soviet Union	2:01.67	Q
2	Anita Weiß	East Germany	2:01.8	Q
3	Jozefína Čerchlanová	Czechoslovakia	2:02.0	Q
4	Liz Barnes	Great Britain	2:02.1	Q
5	Mariana Suman	Romania	2:02.2	Q
6	Marie-Rose Verhoeven	Belgium	2:04.5	
7	Fernande Schmitt	Luxembourg	2:04.7	

== Participation ==
According to an unofficial count, 22 athletes from 12 countries participated in the event.

- Belgium (2)
- Bulgaria (1)
- Czechoslovakia (2)
- East Germany (3)
- Hungary (1)
- Italy (1)
- Liechtenstein (1)
- Luxembourg (1)
- Netherlands (1)
- Romania (3)
- Soviet Union (3)
- Great Britain (3)
