= Elke Decker =

German athletics competitor

Medal record

Women's athletics

Representing West Germany

European Indoor Championships
Gold medal – first place	1980 Sindelfingen	400 m

Elke Decker (born 23 February 1957) is a German female former track and field sprinter who competed in the 400 metres for West Germany. Born in Cologne, her greatest achievement was a gold medal at the 1980 European Athletics Indoor Championships. She also represented her country individually at the 1978 European Athletics Championships and 1982 European Athletics Indoor Championships, as well as in the 4 × 400 metres relay team at the 1979 IAAF World Cup.

Decker was a three-time national champion, winning the 400 m title once outdoors in 1979 and twice indoors in 1977 and 1980. She also topped the rankings as a guest at the Israeli Athletics Championships in 1986. She was a member of TuS 04 Leverkusen athletic club during her career.

== International competitions ==
Year	Competition	Venue	Position	Event	Notes
1978	European Championships	Prague, Czechoslovakia	5th (semis)	400 m	52.92
1978	European Championships	Prague, Czechoslovakia	5th	4 × 400 m relay	3:27.96
1979	IAAF World Cup	Montreal, Canada	4th	4 × 400 m relay	3:27.39
1980	European Indoor Championships	Sindelfingen, West Germany	1st	400 m	52.28
1982	European Indoor Championships	Milan, Italy	4th (heats)	400 m	54.37

== National titles ==
- West German Athletics Championships
  - 400 m: 1979
- West German Indoor Athletics Championships
  - 400 m: 1977, 1980

== See also ==
- List of European Athletics Indoor Championships medalists (women)
