= 1980 European Athletics Indoor Championships – Women's 400 metres =

The women's 400 metres event at the 1980 European Athletics Indoor Championships was held on 1 and 2 March in Sindelfingen.

== Medalists ==
Gold	Silver	Bronze
Elke Decker; West Germany	Karoline Käfer; Austria	Tatyana Goyshchik; Soviet Union

== Results ==
=== Heats ===
First 2 from each heat (Q) and the next 2 fastest (q) qualified for the semifinals.

Rank	Heat	Name	Nationality	Time	Notes
1	3	Elke Decker	West Germany	52.76	Q
2	2	Tatyana Goyshchik	Soviet Union	53.23	Q
3	2	Ilona Pál	Hungary	53.26	Q
4	2	Rositsa Stamenova	Bulgaria	53.45	q
5	3	Rosine Wallez	Belgium	53.49	Q
6	1	Karoline Käfer	Austria	54.13	Q
7	3	Marie-Christine Champenois	France	54.30	q
8	1	Svobodka Damyanova	Bulgaria	54.33	Q
9	1	Tilly Verhoef	Netherlands	54.48	NR
10	2	Mona Evjen	Norway	55.58	

=== Semifinals ===
First 2 from each semifinal qualified directly (Q) for the final.

Rank	Heat	Name	Nationality	Time	Notes
1	1	Elke Decker	West Germany	52.30	Q
2	2	Tatyana Goyshchik	Soviet Union	53.19	Q
3	2	Karoline Käfer	Austria	53.31	Q
4	1	Rositsa Stamenova	Bulgaria	53.37	Q
5	2	Svobodka Damyanova	Bulgaria	53.52	
6	1	Rosine Wallez	Belgium	53.70	
7	2	Ilona Pál	Hungary	53.74	
8	1	Marie-Christine Champenois	France	54.00	

=== Final ===
Rank	Name	Nationality	Time	Notes
1st place, gold medalist(s)	Elke Decker	West Germany	52.28	
2nd place, silver medalist(s)	Karoline Käfer	Austria	52.70	
3rd place, bronze medalist(s)	Tatyana Goyshchik	Soviet Union	52.71	
4	Rositsa Stamenova	Bulgaria	53.06	
