= 1978 European Athletics Championships – Women's 4 × 400 metres relay =

Women's 4 × 400 metres relay at the European Athletics Championships

The women's 4 × 400 metres relay at the 1978 European Athletics Championships was held in Prague, then Czechoslovakia, at Stadion Evžena Rošického on 2 and 3 September 1978.

== Medalists ==
Gold	Christiane Marquardt; Barbara Krug; Christina Brehmer; Marita Koch; East Germany
Silver	Tatyana Prorochenko; Nadezhda Mushta; Tatyana Providokhina; Mariya Kulchunova; Soviet Union
Bronze	Małgorzata Gajewska; Krystyna Kacperczyk; Genowefa Błaszak; Irena Szewińska; Poland

== Results ==
=== Final ===
3 September

Rank	Nation	Competitors	Time	Notes
1st place, gold medalist(s)	East Germany	Christiane Marquardt; Barbara Krug; Christina Brehmer; Marita Koch	3:21.20	CR
2nd place, silver medalist(s)	Soviet Union	Tatyana Prorochenko; Nadezhda Mushta; Tatyana Providokhina; Mariya Kulchunova	3:22.53	
3rd place, bronze medalist(s)	Poland	Małgorzata Gajewska; Krystyna Kacperczyk; Genowefa Błaszak; Irena Szewińska	3:26.76	
4	Great Britain	Karen Williams; Joslyn Hoyte; Verona Elder; Donna Murray	3:27.17	
5	West Germany	Elke Decker; Elke Barth; Gaby Bussmann; Silvia Hollmann	3:27.96	
6	Czechoslovakia	Jarmila Kratochvílová; Jindřiška Kubečková; Eva Ráková; Jozefína Čerchlanová	3:30.4	
7	Romania	Maria Samungi; Doina Badescu; Mariana Suman; Elena Tărîță	3:30.7	
8	Hungary	Eva Mohacsi; Rozalia Halmosi; Irén Orosz; Ilona Pál	3:32.2	

=== Heats ===
2 September

==== Heat 1 ====
Rank	Nation	Competitors	Time	Notes
1	Soviet Union	Tatyana Prorochenko; Nadezhda Mushta; Tatyana Providokhina; Mariya Kulchunova	3:24.2	CR Q
2	Great Britain	Karen Williams; Joslyn Hoyte; Verona Elder; Donna Murray	3:29.0	Q
3	Hungary	Eva Mohacsi; Rozalia Halmosi; Irén Orosz; Ilona Pál	3:30.7	Q
4	Czechoslovakia	Eva Ráková; Jindřiška Kubečková; Jozefína Čerchlanová; Jarmila Kratochvílová	3:31.2	Q
5	France	Catherine Delachanal; Martine Jacquemin; Danièle Lairloup; Patricia Darbonville	3:33.8	
6	Netherlands	Tilly Verhoef; Truus van Amstel; Coby Körmeling; Wilma Hillen	3:34.7	

==== Heat 2 ====
Rank	Nation	Competitors	Time	Notes
1	East Germany	Christiane Marquardt; Barbara Krug; Christina Brehmer; Marita Koch	3:27.7	Q
2	West Germany	Elke Decker; Elke Barth; Gaby Bussmann; Silvia Hollmann	3:30.9	Q
3	Poland	Małgorzata Gajewska; Genowefa Błaszak; Krystyna Kacperczyk; Irena Szewińska	3:31.2	Q
4	Romania	Maria Samungi; Doina Badescu; Mariana Suman; Elena Tărîță	3:31.8	Q
5	Finland	Yvonne Hannus; Barbro Lindström; Mona-Lisa Pursiainen; Pirjo Häggman	3:32.2	
6	Belgium	Anne Michel; Rosine Wallez; Anne-Marie Van Nuffel; Lea Alaerts	3:33.4	

== Participation ==
According to an unofficial count, 48 athletes from 12 countries participated in the event.

- Belgium (4)
- Czechoslovakia (4)
- East Germany (4)
- Finland (4)
- France (4)
- Hungary (4)
- Netherlands (4)
- Poland (4)
- Romania (4)
- Soviet Union (4)
- Great Britain (4)
- West Germany (4)
