= Under-23 athletics =

Sport age category

Under 23 is a category of athletics in which athletes are between 20 and 22 years old on 31 December of the year of the competition.

== Championships ==
- European Athletics U23 Championships, organized by the EAA every 2 years
- NACAC U23 Championships in Athletics
- South American Under-23 Championships in Athletics

== Games ==
- Pan American Youth Games
- Caribbean Games

== See also ==
- List of world under-23 bests in athletics
- Under-18 athletics
- Under-20 athletics
