= Italy, Texas =

- Town
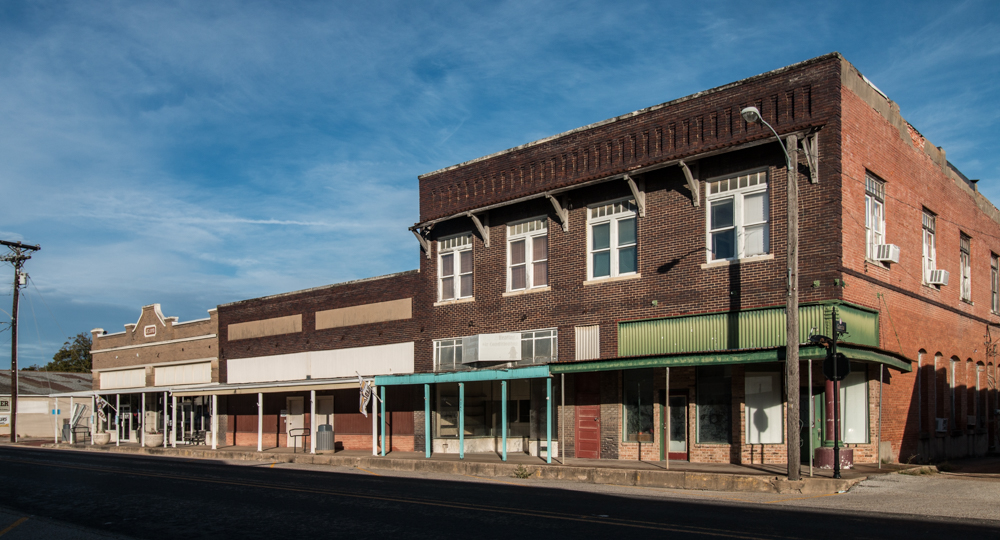
- Downtown Italy, Texas
- Motto: "The biggest little town in Texas"
- Location of Italy, Texas
- Coordinates: 32°10′58″N 96°52′46″W
- Country: United States
- State: Texas
- County: Ellis

Area
  - Total: 1.80 sq mi (4.67 km^{2})
  - Land: 1.80 sq mi (4.67 km^{2})
  - Water: 0 sq mi (0.00 km^{2})
- Elevation: 551 ft (168 m)

Population (2020)
  - Total: 1,926
  - Density: 1,070/sq mi (412/km^{2})
- Time zone: UTC-6 (Central (CST))
  - Summer (DST): UTC-5 (CDT)
- ZIP code: 76651
- Area codes: 214, 469, 945, 972
- FIPS code: 48-37072
- GNIS feature ID: 2412797
- Website: www.ci.italy.tx.us

Italy (/ˈɪtli/ IT-lee, unlike the country) is a town in Ellis County, Texas, United States. Its population was 1,926 in 2020. The community was named after Italy by a settler who had visited the European country.

== History ==
Italy was founded in 1879 by settlers who found the surrounding land suitable for growing cotton, corn, sweet potatoes, and wheat. The Missouri–Kansas–Texas Railroad reached Italy in 1890, with the railroad stop making the town an important market center. The population grew steadily, from 1,061 in 1900 to 1,500 in 1925, until the Great Depression sparked a decline lasting over three decades. The town began to see economic and population growth again in the 1970s, with the population rising to nearly 2,000 residents by 2000.

== Geography ==
Italy is located in southwestern Ellis County. Interstate 35E crosses the northwestern corner of the town at exit 386; it leads north 15 miles (24 km) to Waxahachie, the county seat, north 44 miles (71 km) to downtown Dallas, and southwestward 15 miles (24 km) to its junction with I-35W near Hillsboro. U.S. Route 77 passes through the center of Italy and parallels I-35E. Texas State Highway 34 leads northeast from the center of Italy 20 miles (32 km) to Ennis.

According to the United States Census Bureau, Italy has a total area of 1.8 square miles (4.7 km^{2}), all land.

== Demographics ==
Historical population
Census	Pop.	Note	%±
1890	370		—
1900	1,061		186.8%
1910	1,149		8.3%
1920	1,350		17.5%
1930	1,230		−8.9%
1940	1,224		−0.5%
1950	1,185		−3.2%
1960	1,183		−0.2%
1970	1,309		10.7%
1980	1,306		−0.2%
1990	1,699		30.1%
2000	1,993		17.3%
2010	1,863		−6.5%
2020	1,926		3.4%

Italy racial composition as of 2020 (NH = Non-Hispanic) (Note: Note: the US Census treats Hispanic/Latino as an ethnic category. This table excludes Latinos from the racial categories and assigns them to a separate category. Hispanics/Latinos can be of any race.)
Race	Number	Percentage
White (NH)	1,133	58.83%
Black or African American (NH)	234	12.15%
Native American or Alaska Native (NH)	8	0.42%
Asian (NH)	7	0.36%
Mixed/multiracial (NH)	56	2.91%
Hispanic or Latino	488	25.34%
Total	1,926	

As of the 2020 United States census, 1,926 people, 765 households, and 561 families resided in the town.

== Notable people ==
- Keith Davis, former safety for the Dallas Cowboys
- Dale Evans, actress; wife of Roy Rogers
- Jack Hyles, pastor of First Baptist Church of Hammond, Indiana, founder of Hyles-Anderson College
- Kortnei Johnson, athlete
- J. B. Milam, principal chief of the Cherokee Nation of Oklahoma
- Art Shires, former first baseman for the Chicago White Sox, Washington Senators and Boston Braves

== Education ==
The town is served by the Italy Independent School District, which includes Italy High School (grades 7–12) and Stafford Elementary (prekindergarten - grade 6), and the S.M. Dunlap Memorial Library.

In 2009, the school district was rated "academically acceptable" by the Texas Education Agency.

== Climate ==
The climate in this area is characterized by hot, humid summers and generally mild to cool winters. According to the Köppen climate classification, Italy has a humid subtropical climate, Cfa on climate maps.

== Gallery ==
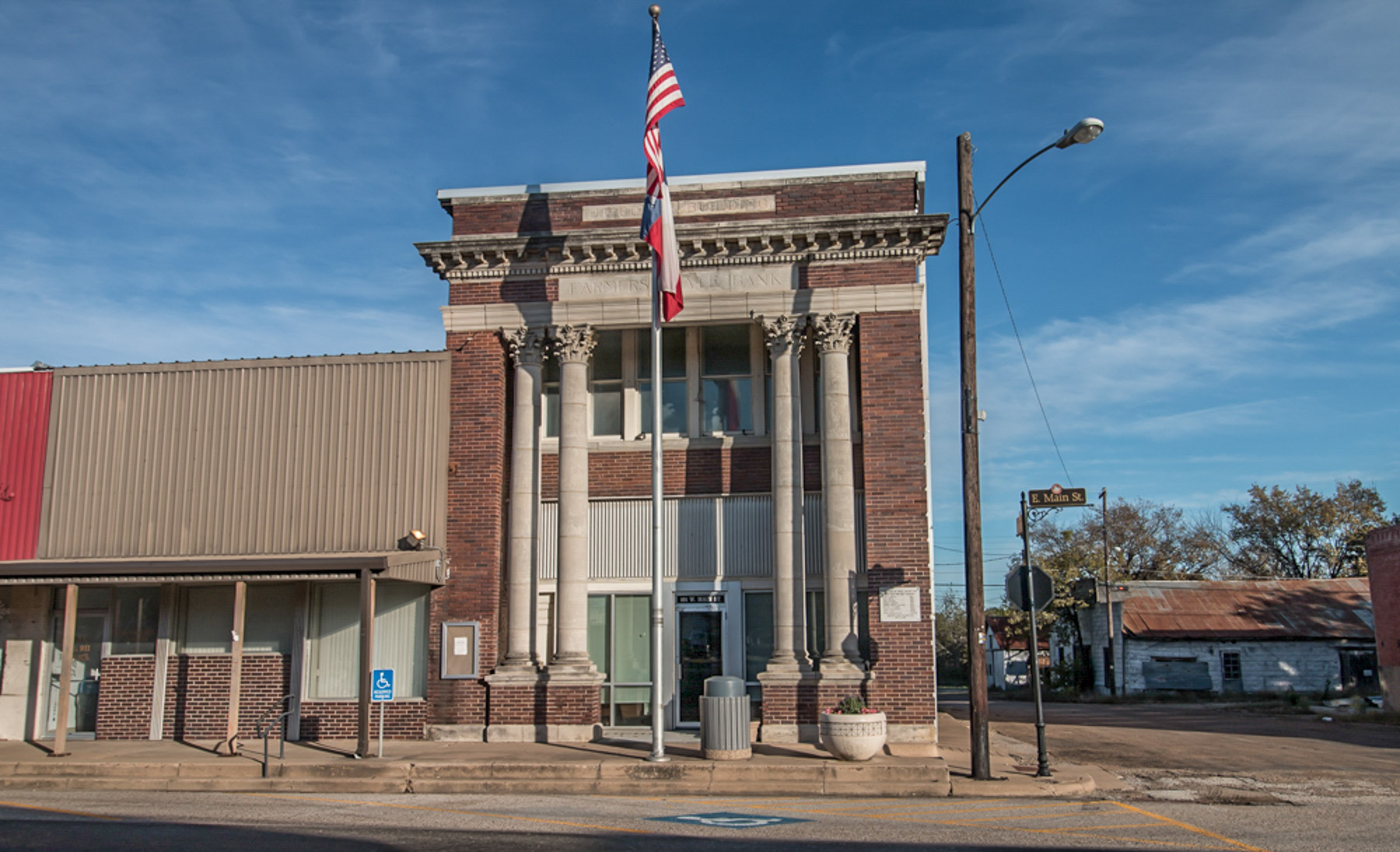
Farmers State Bank

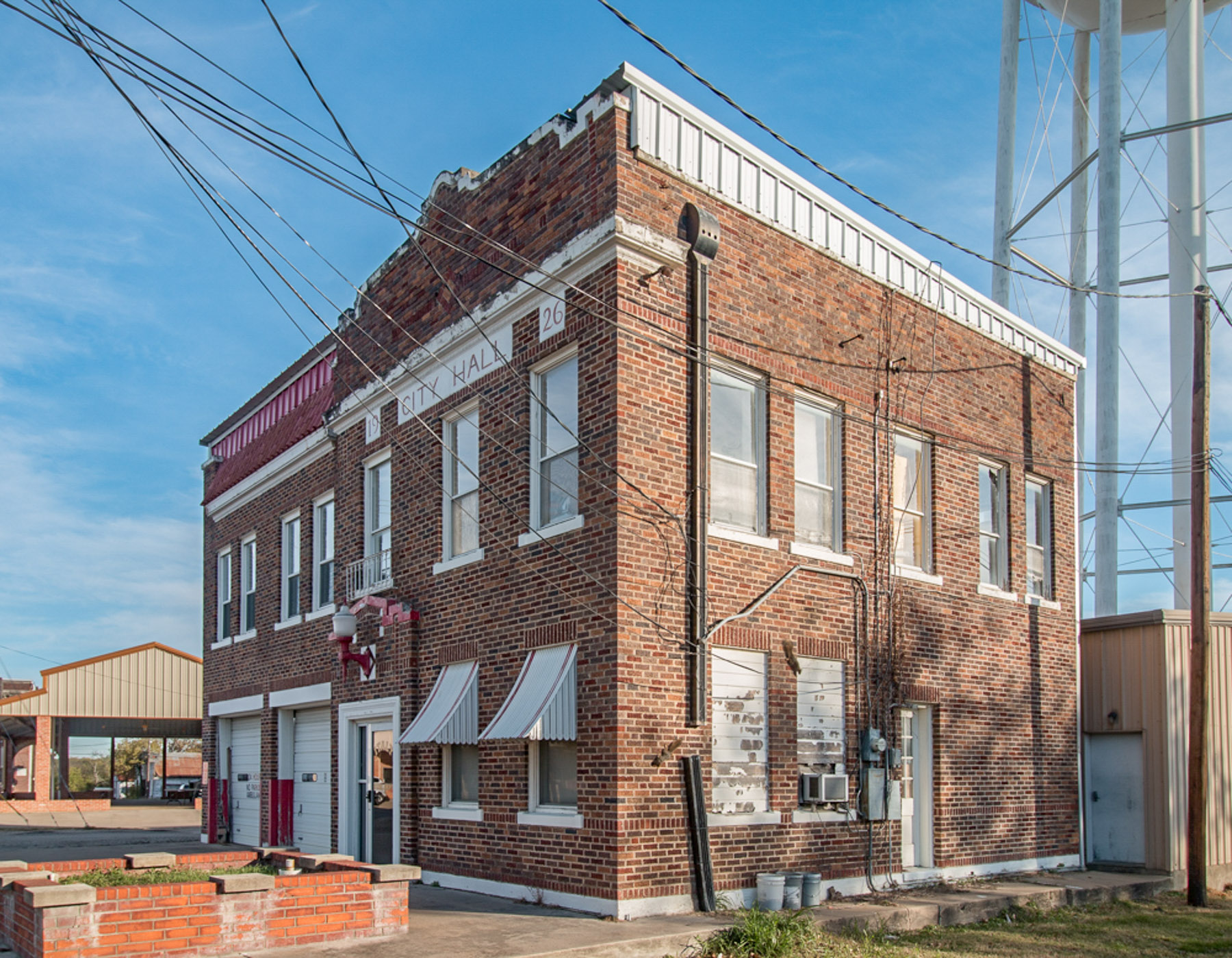
City Hall
