= Kortnei Johnson =

American sprinter (born 1997)

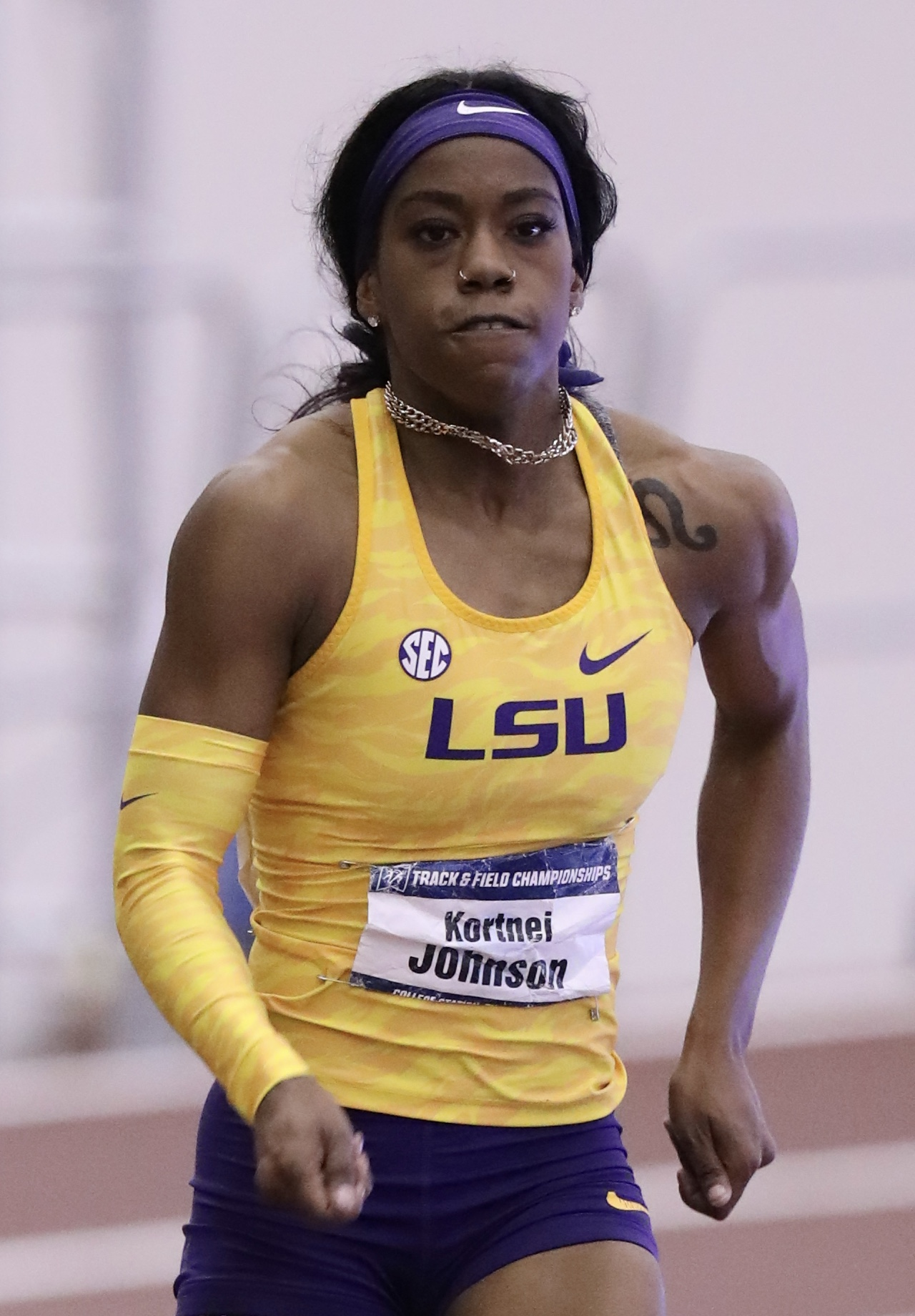
- Johnson at the 2018 NCAA Division I Indoor Track and Field Championships

Personal information
- Full name: Kortnei LeAnn Johnson
- Born: August 11, 1997 (age 28)
- Home town: Italy, Texas, US
- Education: Italy High School; Louisiana State University
- Height: 165 cm (5 ft 5 in)
- Weight: 52 kg (115 lb)

Sport
- Sport: Sport of athletics
- Events: 100 metres 200 metres
- College team: LSU Lady Tigers
- Coached by: Bobby Campbell; Dennis Shaver

Achievements and titles
- National finals: 2016 NCAAs; • 4 × 100 m, 1st (gold); 2017 NCAA Indoors; • 60 m, 6th; 2018 NCAA Indoors; • 60 m, 7th; • 200 m, 3rd (bronze); 2018 NCAAs; • 200 m, 5th; • 4 × 100 m, 1st (gold); 2019 NCAA Indoors; • 60 m, 5th; 2019 NCAAs; • 4 × 100 m, 2nd (silver)
- Personal bests: 100 m: 11.05 (+0.9); 200 m: 22.56 (+0.5)
- Updated on May 4, 2024

Kortnei LeAnn Johnson (born August 11, 1997) is an American sprinter. Running for the LSU Lady Tigers track and field program, she won two NCAA Division I Women's Outdoor Track and Field Championships relay titles and set the world under-23 record in the 4 × 100 metres relay in 2018. She represented the United States at the 2023 Pan American Games.

== Career ==
Johnson is from Italy, Texas, United States. She attended Italy High School, where she was a seven-time University Interscholastic League Texas state high school champion in track and field. As Italy High School did not have a running track, she had to train on grass and concrete. She was described as the most successful athlete in Italy HS history, and when she graduated a parade was held in her honor. She was then recruited for the LSU Lady Tigers track and field team; when the LSU coach Dennis Shaver visited Johnson's school, he was surprised by the lack of training facilities. Joining in 2015, she qualified for the 2016 NCAA DI Outdoor Championships in the 100 m, 200 m, and 4 × 100 m in her first series of competition. Though she didn't advance to the finals in the 100 m or 200 m, she won her first national championship in the relay, setting a new Hayward Field record of 42.65 seconds.

Johnson would win her first individual NCAA medal at the 2018 NCAA Division I Outdoor Track and Field Championships, placing 3rd in the 200 metres. At that year's Southeastern Conference outdoor championships, Johnson set an NCAA record and world under-23 best in the 4 × 100 m relay. Running second leg with Mikiah Brisco, Rachel Misher, and Aleia Hobbs, her LSU team split 42.05 seconds. Later at the outdoor national championships, Johnson only contested the 4 × 100 m relay and won her second national title in that event. It was her final national title, as during her senior season's outdoor championships her 4 × 100 m team lost to the USC Trojans. Johnson competed at the 2019 USA Outdoor Track and Field Championships in the 100 m, but she placed 6th in her semi-final and did not advance to the finals. In September of that year, she was selected as a member of one of the two U.S. 4 × 100 m teams at The Match Europe v USA. Running with Courtne Davis, Kiara Parker, and Kyra Jefferson, her team placed 2nd, losing only to the other U.S. team.

In 2021, Johnson ran a time of 22.40 seconds to finish runner-up in the 200 metres straight at the Adidas Boost Boston Games, making her the #4 performer of all time in that event. She also competed at the 2021 United States Olympic trials in the 100 m, failing to advance from the first round. Johnson again did not advance to the finals in the 100 m and 200 m at the 2022 USA Outdoor Track and Field Championships. In 2023, Johnson was selected to represent the U.S. at the 2023 Pan American Games in the 100 m and 4 × 100 m relay. She did not advance to the 100 m finals but her relay team did advance. In the finals, Johnson was substituted with Alaysha Johnson. The relay baton was dropped and the U.S. team had to jog to the finish in a time of 1:01.30.

== Statistics ==
=== Personal best progression ===
100 m progression
#	Mark	Pl.	Competition	Venue	Date	Ref.
1	11.97 (±0.0 m/s)	1st place, gold medalist(s)	University Interscholastic League 2A Championships	Austin, TX	May 10, 2012	
2	11.82 (+1.5 m/s)	1st place, gold medalist(s)	Clyde Littlefield Texas Relays	Austin, TX	March 29, 2013	
3	11.51 (+1.9 m/s)	1st place, gold medalist(s)	University Interscholastic League Championships	Austin, TX	May 9, 2014	
4	11.36 (+0.8 m/s)	3rd place, bronze medalist(s)	Texas Invitational	Austin, TX	April 15, 2016	
5	11.29 (−0.2 m/s)	2nd place, silver medalist(s)	Conference Championships	Tuscaloosa, AL	May 13, 2016	
6	11.27 (+1.6 m/s)	(gold) (Qualification 2)	NCAA Division I East Preliminary Round	Jacksonville, FL	May 26, 2016	
7	11.13 (+1.9 m/s)	(gold) (Heat 1)	Clyde Littlefield Texas Relays	Austin, TX	March 30, 2017	
8	11.09 (+0.7 m/s)	3rd place, bronze medalist(s)	Annual Mt. SAC Relays	Torrance, CA	April 14, 2017	
9	11.05 (+0.9 m/s)	2nd place, silver medalist(s)	PURE Athletics Sprint Elite Meet	Clermont, FL	May 13, 2023	

200 m progression
#	Mark	Pl.	Competition	Venue	Date	Ref.
1	23.94 (+1.5 m/s)	1st place, gold medalist(s)	UIL State Track & Field Meet	Austin, TX	May 10, 2013	
2	23.79	(silver) (Round F)	Razorback Invitational	Fayetteville, AR	January 28, 2016	
3	23.56A	(gold) (Round C)	Univ of New Mexico Collegiate Classic	Albuquerque, NM	February 4, 2016	
4	23.43	3rd place, bronze medalist(s)	Tyson Invitational	Fayetteville, AR	February 12, 2016	
5	23.26 (±0.0 m/s)	2nd place, silver medalist(s)	Miami Hurricane Twilight Invitational	Coral Gables, FL	March 24, 2016	
6	22.78 (+1.9 m/s)	(gold) (Heat 3)	Conference Championships	Tuscaloosa, AL	May 11, 2016	
7	22.61 (+0.9 m/s)	1st place, gold medalist(s)	Miami Hurricane Collegiate Invitational	Coral Gables, FL	April 13, 2018	
8	22.56 (+0.5 m/s)	(gold) (Qualification 3)	NCAA East Preliminary Round	Tampa, FL	May 25, 2018	
