= Italy High School =

Public school in Texas, United States

Coordinates: 32.1813°N 96.8792°W

Location
- 300 South College; Italy, Texas 76651-0909; United States

Information
- School type: Public high school
- School district: Italy Independent School District
- Staff: 25.85 (on an FTE basis)
- Grades: 7–12
- Enrollment: 283 (2024–2025)
- Student to teacher ratio: 10.95
- Colors: White & Old Gold
- Athletics conference: UIL Class AA
- Mascot: Gladiator
- Website: ihs.italyisd.org

Italy High School is a public high school located in the city of Italy, Texas, in Ellis County, United States and classified as a 2A school by the UIL. It is a part of the Italy Independent School District located in southwest Ellis County. In 2013, the school was rated "Met Standard" by the Texas Education Agency.

== History ==
In 2011 Lee Joffre became the principal of Italy High. He became the superintendent of the district in 2016.

On January 22, 2018, 16-year-old male student Chad Padilla shot a fellow student in the cafeteria, wounding 15-year-old female student Mahkayla Jones. The shooter was arrested and initially charged as a juvenile with aggravated assault though the case was eventually moved to adult court and he was sentenced to 40 years on an attempted murder charge and 20 years on each of the aggravated assault indictments. Those sentences will be served concurrently. Padilla was found dead on March 24, 2022 in his cell at Telford Unit in New Boston, Texas of a suspected suicide.

== Athletics ==
The Italy Gladiators compete in: volleyball, cross country, football, basketball, powerlifting, golf, tennis, track, baseball, and softball.

=== State Titles ===
- Boys Basketball
  - 1997(2A)

== Notable alumni ==
- Keith Davis - (born December 30, 1978) is a former professional football player for the Dallas Cowboys of the NFL.
- Kortnei Johnson (born 1997), American sprinter
