= Samungi =

Samungi is a surname. Notable people with the surname include:

- Maria Samungi (1950–2025), Romanian sprinter
- Valentin Samungi (1942–2024), Romanian handball player
