= Małgorzata Dunecka =

Polish sprinter

Personal information
- Nationality: Polish
- Born: Małgorzata Gajewska; 21 December 1956 (age 69) Żółkiewka, Poland
- Height: 1.76 m (5 ft 9 in)
- Weight: 67 kg (148 lb)

Sport
- Sport: Sprinting
- Event: 400 metres
Medal record
Women's athletics
Representing Poland
European Championships
Bronze medal – third place	1978 Prague	4×400 m

Małgorzata Dunecka (née Gajewska; born 21 December 1956) is a Polish sprinter. She competed in the women's 400 metres at the 1980 Summer Olympics.

She is married to the sprinter Leszek Dunecki.
