= Genowefa Błaszak =

Polish hurdler

Personal information
- Nationality: Polish

Sport
- Sport: Athletics
- Event(s): 100 m, 200 m
Medal record
Women's athletics
Representing Poland
European Championships
Bronze medal – third place	1978 Prague	4×400 m
Bronze medal – third place	1986 Stuttgart	4x400 m
European Indoor Championships
Bronze medal – third place	1975 Katowice	4×320 m

Genowefa Nowaczyk-Błaszak (born July 22, 1957, in Książ Wielkopolski) is a former female track and field hurdler from Poland, who represented her native country at the 1988 Summer Olympics in Seoul, South Korea. She set her personal best (54.27) in the women's 400m hurdles event in 1985.
