= Italy Independent School District =

School district in Texas, United States

Italy Independent School District is a public school district based in Italy, Texas (USA). In the 2017–2018 school year the district had 628 students.

== History ==
In 2009, the school district was rated "academically acceptable" by the Texas Education Agency.

In 2011 Lee Joffre became the principal of Italy High School. In 2016 became the superintendent of Italy ISD. His wife worked as a librarian and in other capacities for Italy ISD for six years. Joffre resigned from Italy ISD in January 2019 and became the superintendent of Mabank Independent School District effective January 7, 2019. The district appointed John Spies as interim superintendent; he was a consultant for Education Service Center Region 10.

By 2019 the district had spent about $14 million on renovations including a football stadium, an addition and equipment for Stafford Elementary, and a running track.

== Schools and facilities ==
- Italy High School (Grades 7–12)
- Stafford Elementary (Grades PK-6)
  - By 2019 the school had a 30,000-square-foot (2,800 m^{2}) expansion which includes a library. The money also funded objects for the playground.

By 2019 the district established a livestock barn so students who do not have agricultural equipment at home can do agricultural-related activities.
