= Tatyana Providokhina =

Soviet middle-distance runner

Personal information
- Born: 26 March 1953 (age 73) Leningrad, Soviet Union
Medal record
Women's athletics
Representing the Soviet Union
Olympic Games
Bronze medal – third place	1980 Moscow	800 m
European Championships
Gold medal – first place	1978 Prague	800 m
Silver medal – second place	1978 Prague	4×400 m

Tatyana Petrovna Providokhina (Russian: Татьяна Петровна Провидохина; born 26 March 1953 in Leningrad) is a former Soviet athlete, who mainly competed in the 800 metres.

She competed for the USSR in the 1980 Summer Olympics held in Moscow, where she won the bronze medal in the women's 800 metres event. She also won the gold medal in the 800 metres at the 1978 European Championships in Athletics.
