= 1978 Italian Athletics Championships =

- Dates: 22–26 July
- Host city: Rome
- Level: Senior

The 1978 Italian Athletics Championships was the 68th edition of the Italian Athletics Championships and were held in Rome (track & field events).

== Champions ==
=== Men ===
Event	Athlete	Performance
100 metres	Pietro Mennea	10.30
200 metres	Pietro Mennea	20.35
400 metres	Stefano Malinverni	46.63
800 metres	Carlo Grippo	1:47.8a
1500 metres	Fulvio Costa	3:45.3a
5000 metres	Piero Selvaggio	13:57.8a
10,000 metres	Venanzio Ortis	28:55.6a
110 metres hurdles	Giuseppe Buttari	13.79
400 metres hurdles	Giorgio Ballati	50.68
3000 metres steeplechase	Roberto Volpi	8:30.3a
High jump	Rodolfo Bergamo	2.24
Pole vault	Renato Dionisi	5.20
Long jump	Maurizio Maffi	7.69
Triple jump	Paolo Piapan	15.78
Shot put	Angelo Groppelli	19.07
Discus throw	Armando De Vincentis	61.84
Hammer throw	Gian Paolo Urlando	74.14
Javelin throw	Vanni Rodeghiero	73.50*
Decathlon	Hubert Indra	6457
Half Marathon	Massimo Magnani	1:31:50*
Marathon	Massimo Magnani	02:16:46
10,000 metres track walk	not held	
20 km road walk	Maurizio Damilano	01:26:42
50 km road walk	Paolo Grecucci	03:51:31
Cross country (long course)	Franco Fava	

=== Women ===
Event	Athlete	Performance
100 metres	Laura Miano	11.54
200 metres	Marisa Masullo	23.98
400 metres	Erica Rossi	53.76
800 metres	Agnese Possamai	2:05.7a
1500 metres	Gabriella Dorio	4:09.5a
3000 metres	Silvana Cruciata	9:05.1a
100 metres hurdles	Ileana Ongar	13.76
400 metres hurdles	Giuseppina Cirulli	59.88
3000 metres steeplechase	-	-
High jump	Sara Simeoni	1.95
Pole vault	-	-
Long jump	Emanuela Nini	6.28
Triple jump	-	-
Shot put	Cinzia Petrucci	16.10
Discus throw	Renata Scaglia	52.96
Hammer throw	-	-
Javelin throw	Giuliana Amici	58.72*
Pentathlon	Barbara Bachlechner	3853p
Marathon	-	-
Cross country (long course)	Agnese Possamai	
