= Keith Davis (safety) =

American football player (born 1978)

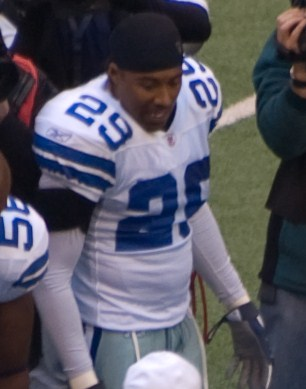
- Keith Davis in 2007.

No. 40, 29
- Position: Safety

Personal information
- Born: December 30, 1978 (age 47); Dallas, Texas, U.S.
- Listed height: 5 ft 11 in (1.80 m)
- Listed weight: 205 lb (93 kg)

Career information
- High school: Italy (TX)
- College: Sam Houston State
- NFL draft: 2002: undrafted

Career history
- Dallas Cowboys (2002–2007); → Berlin Thunder (2004); Miami Dolphins (2008)*; Dallas Cowboys (2008); Oakland Raiders (2009)*; Florida Tuskers (2010); Virginia Destroyers (2011)
- * Offseason or practice squad member only

Awards and highlights
- Division I-AA All-American (2001); 2× All-Southland Conference (2000, 2001); Southland Conference Defensive Player of the Year (2000); All-NFL Europe (2004)

Career NFL statistics
- Total tackles: 183
- Forced fumbles: 3
- Fumble recoveries: 1
- Pass deflections: 6
- Stats at Pro Football Reference

Keith Lamont Davis (born December 30, 1978) is an American former professional football player who was a safety for the Dallas Cowboys of the National Football League (NFL). He played college football for the Sam Houston State Bearkats.

== Early life ==
Davis attended Italy High School. In football, he was a four-year starter. He had 33 touchdown receptions and 5 blocked punts in his last 2 seasons. He was a two-time All-District and All-State wide receiver and defensive back at UIL Class AA.

He was a starter on the varsity basketball team that won the 1997 Class AA State Championship. He also lettered in baseball.

== College career ==
Davis accepted a football scholarship from Sam Houston State University. As a redshirt freshman, he started 5 games at safety and made 40 tackles.

As a sophomore, he was named a starter at safety, posting 104 tackles, 11 passes defensed, 2 interceptions, 3 forced fumbles, 2 fumble recoveries and 3 blocked punts.

As a junior, he was named Southland Conference Defensive Player of the Year and team MVP after posting 99 tackles, 14 tackles for loss (led the team), 2 interceptions and 2 blocked punts.

As a senior, he led the team with 96 tackles (led the team), 67 solo tackles (led the team), 7 pass defended, three forced fumbles, one sack, and one fumble recovery. He earned Division I-AA All-American honors and All-Southland Conference honors after the season. He finished his college career with 339 tackles (fourth in school history) and 6 interceptions.

In 2013, he was named to the Southland Conference 2000s All-Decade Team. In 2014, he was inducted into the Sam Houston State Athletic Hall of Honor.

On December 7, 2018, Davis graduated from Sam Houston State University with a Bachelor of Science in Kinesiology degree.

== Professional career ==
=== Dallas Cowboys (first stint) ===
Davis was signed as an undrafted free agent by the Dallas Cowboys after the 2002 NFL draft. He was waived on September 1. He was signed to the practice squad on September 3. He was released on September 11. He was re-signed to the practice squad on September 16. He was promoted to the active roster on October 12. He was cut on October 22. He was re-signed to the practice squad on October 23. He was promoted to the active roster on November 22. He played in 8 games as a backup safety and on special teams. He was credited with 5 defensive tackles, 2 quarterback pressures, one pass breakup and 8 special teams tackles.

In 2003, before the start of training camp, he was shot in the right hip and left elbow around 2:20 a.m. outside the Dallas Gentlemen's Club. Davis had driven to the club after closing time to pick up a friend. The friend was sitting at a table where an altercation broke out, and spilled outside to the parking lot, culminating with his shooting while defending his girlfriend. While he did nothing to provoke the incident, and was regarded as an unwitting victim, head coach Bill Parcells believed Davis should not have placed himself in a questionable situation and released him from the team on July 26.

On January 13, 2004, he rejoined the club after Parcells gave him a second chance, re-signing him to play in NFL Europe. Davis took advantage of the opportunity and was named All-league, while helping the Berlin Thunder to the World Bowl XII championship. He compiled 65 tackles (second on the team), 4 interceptions (second in the league), 15 pass defenses and 2 forced fumbles. He made the Cowboys regular season roster and was second on the team with 21 special teams tackles. He also was selected to the USA Today All-Joe Team.

In 2005, Davis started 15 games at free safety alongside Roy Williams. He finished 68 defensive tackles (fourth on the team), one tackle for loss, 3 passes defensed, 16 special teams tackles (led the team) and one forced fumble

On April 10, 2006, the New Orleans Saints signed him to a restricted free agent offer sheet, but the Cowboys retained his player rights by matching the offer. On July 16, he was shot for the second time in just three years. This time he was randomly shot in the back of the head and in his right thigh, while driving to church at 5:30 a.m. on a Dallas freeway. He drove himself to the hospital and was later discharged. He was part of a platoon at free safety with rookie Pat Watkins. Davis started 6 games, tallying 21 defensive tackles, one quarterback pressure, 14 special teams tackles (fourth on the team).

In 2007, Ken Hamlin took over the free safety position. Davis appeared in 14 games with one start at strong safety, making 7 defensive tackles, one pass defensed and 18 special teams tackles (tied for third on the team).

=== Miami Dolphins ===
On March 11, 2008, Davis signed as an unrestricted free agent with the Miami Dolphins, reuniting him with team vice president Bill Parcells. In a surprise move, the Dolphins released him a day before the final preseason game.

=== Dallas Cowboys (second stint) ===
On August 31, 2008, Davis was re-signed by the Dallas Cowboys, just days after being released by the Dolphins. He was named team captain for the season despite being on the roster only a few days. He appeared in 16 with 9 starts at strong safety, collecting 40 tackles (one for loss), 2 passes defensed and 20 special teams (led the team). He also received the Ed Block Courage Award for playing with a torn pectoral muscle. He wasn't re-signed after the season.

Davis finished his professional career with 171 defensive tackles, no interceptions and 6 passes defensed. He is considered to be one of the best special teams players in the history of the Dallas Cowboys.

=== Oakland Raiders ===
On May 21, 2009, the Oakland Raiders signed him as a free agent to add depth at the safety position. He was released before the start of training camp on July 12.

=== Florida Tuskers (UFL) ===
In 2010, after being out of football for one year, he signed as a free agent with the Florida Tuskers of the United Football League. He was a backup strong safety behind J. R. Reed. In 2011, he played for the Virginia Destroyers which was the team that replaced the Tuskers.

== NFL career statistics ==
Legend
**Bold**	Career high

=== Regular season ===
Year	Team	Games		Tackles					Interceptions					Fumbles			
Year	Team	GP	GS	Cmb	Solo	Ast	Sck	TFL	Int	Yds	TD	Lng	PD	FF	FR	Yds	TD
2002	DAL	8	0	5	4	1	0.0	0	0	0	0	0	0	0	0	0	0
2004	DAL	15	0	19	15	4	0.0	0	0	0	0	0	0	**2**	0	0	0
2005	DAL	**16**	**15**	**66**	**47**	**19**	0.0	**1**	0	0	0	0	**3**	0	**1**	**5**	0
2006	DAL	15	6	35	24	11	0.0	0	0	0	0	0	0	0	0	0	0
2007	DAL	14	1	19	17	2	0.0	0	0	0	0	0	2	1	0	0	0
2008	DAL	**16**	9	39	30	9	0.0	0	0	0	0	0	1	0	0	0	0
Career		84	31	183	137	46	0.0	1	0	0	0	0	6	3	1	5	0

=== Playoffs ===
Year	Team	Games		Tackles					Interceptions					Fumbles			
Year	Team	GP	GS	Cmb	Solo	Ast	Sck	TFL	Int	Yds	TD	Lng	PD	FF	FR	Yds	TD
2006	DAL	**1**	0	**1**	0	**1**	0.0	0	0	0	0	0	0	0	0	0	0
2007	DAL	**1**	0	0	0	0	0.0	0	0	0	0	0	0	0	0	0	0
Career		2	0	1	0	1	0.0	0	0	0	0	0	0	0	0	0	0
