= Christina Lathan =

East German sprinter (born 1958)

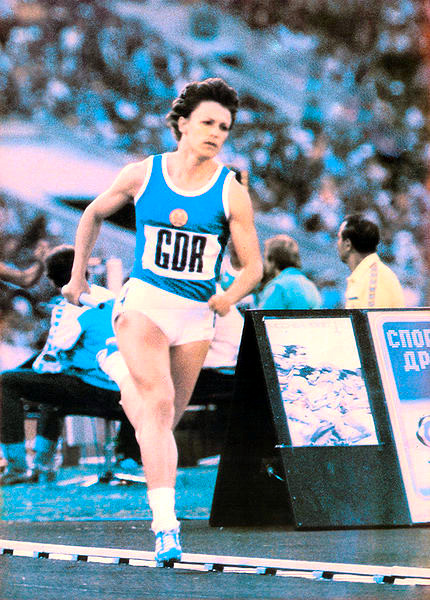
- Lathan in 1980

Personal information
- Born: 28 February 1958 (age 68) Altdöbern, East Germany
Medal record
Women's athletics
Representing East Germany
Olympic Games
Gold medal – first place	1976 Montreal	4 × 400 m
Silver medal – second place	1976 Montreal	400 m
Silver medal – second place	1980 Moscow	4 × 400 m
Bronze medal – third place	1980 Moscow	400 m
European Championships
Gold medal – first place	1978 Prague	4 × 400 m
Silver medal – second place	1978 Prague	400 m
Summer Universiade
Bronze medal – third place	1979 Mexico City	400 m

Christina Lathan, née Christina Brehmer, (born 28 February 1958) is a retired East German sprinter who specialised in the 400 metres.

Born in Altdöbern, Brehmer started training in 1969 at the sports club SG Dynamo Senftenberg, and was transferred to SC Dynamo Berlin in 1973. At the 1975 European Junior Championships she won three gold medals, in 400 m, 4 × 100 metres relay and 4 × 400 metres relay.

In 1976 she set world record 49.77 seconds, first electronic time under 50 seconds. The record was broken by Poland's Irena Szewińska a month later. At the 1976 Summer Olympics in Montreal she won the silver medal in the 400 m behind Irena Szewinska, as well as a gold medal in the 4 × 400 m relay with her teammates Brigitte Rohde, 400 m bronze medalist Ellen Streidt and Doris Maletzki.

The next year Lathan won another relay gold medal at the IAAF World Cup 1977. At the 1978 European Championships she won a silver medal in the individual event and another gold medal in 4 × 400 m relay, together with teammates Christiane Marquardt, Barbara Krug and Marita Koch. She then duplicated her World Cup success at the 1979 IAAF World Cup.

She returned to the 1980 Summer Olympics and won a bronze medal in the 400 m behind Marita Koch and Jarmila Kratochvílová. In the 4 × 400 m relay she was the sole survivor of the 1976 winning team and could only win the silver medal with her teammates Gabriele Löwe, Barbara Krug and Marita Koch.
