= Barbara Krug =

East German sprinter (born 1956)

Medal record

Women's athletics

Representing East Germany

Olympic Games
Silver medal – second place	1980 Moscow	4×400 m

European Championships
Gold medal – first place	1978 Prague	4×400 m

Barbara Krug (born 6 May 1956, in Leipzig) is a retired East German sprinter who specialized in the 400 metres.

At the 1978 European Championships she won a gold medal in the 4 × 400 m relay, together with teammates Christiane Marquardt, Christina Lathan and Marita Koch. Krug then finished fourth at the 1979 European Indoor Championships.

Krug, Lathan and Koch remained on the relay team for the 1980 Summer Olympics, with Gabriele Löwe replacing Christiane Marquardt. The team won the Olympic silver medal in 4 × 400 m relay.

Krug competed for the club SC DHfK Leipzig during her active career.
