= Christiane Marquardt =

East German sprinter (born 1958)

Medal record

Women's athletics

Representing East Germany

European Championships
Gold medal – first place	1978 Prague	4×400 m

Christiane Marquardt (born 13 November 1958 in Berlin) is a retired East German sprinter who specialized in the 400 metres. She represented the sports team TSC Berlin.

At the 1978 European Championships she finished fifth in the 400m and won a gold medal in 4 × 400 metres relay, together with Barbara Krug, Marita Koch and Christina Brehmer. Later that year, she was awarded the Patriotic Order of Merit (bronze, 3rd class).
