= Ilona Pál =

Hungarian sprinter

Personal information
- Born: 21 October 1954 (age 71) Jászfényszaru, Hungary

Sport
- Sport: Track and field

Ilona Pál (born 21 October 1954) is a Hungarian former sprinter who competed in the 1980 Summer Olympics.

She is the current Hungarian record holder in the 400m race with a time of 51.50 seconds, set on 11 August 1980 in Budapest, Hungary.
