= 1978 European Athletics Championships =

12th European Athletics Championships
- The logo of the 1978 European Athletics Championships
- Dates: 29 August – 3 September
- Host city: Prague, Czechoslovakia
- Venue: Stadion Evžena Rošického
- Level: Senior
- Type: Outdoor
- Events: 40
- Participation: 1004 athletes from 29 nations

The 12th European Athletics Championships were held from 29 August to 3 September 1978 in the Stadion Evžena Rošického in Prague, the capital city of Czechoslovakia (present-day Czech Republic). Contemporaneous reports on the event were given in the Glasgow Herald.

There were a number of disqualifications because of infringements of IAAF doping rules resulting in 18-month bans for shot putter Yevgeniy Mironov, javelin thrower Vasiliy Yershov, and pentathletes Nadiya Tkachenko and Yekaterina Gordiyenko, all competing for the Soviet Union, as well as shot putter Elena Stoyanova from Bulgaria.

== Men's results ==
Complete results were published.

=== Track ===
1971 |1974 |1978 |1982 |1986 |

Event	Gold		Silver		Bronze	
100 metres	Pietro Mennea; Italy	10.27^{[nb1]}	Eugen Ray; East Germany	10.36	Vladimir Ignatenko; Soviet Union	10.37
200 metres	Pietro Mennea; Italy	20.16 CR	Olaf Prenzler; East Germany	20.61	Peter Muster; Switzerland	20.64
400 metres	Franz-Peter Hofmeister; West Germany	45.73	Karel Kolář; Czechoslovakia	45.77	Francis Demarthon; France	45.97
800 metres	Olaf Beyer; East Germany	1:43.84 CR	Steve Ovett; Great Britain	1:44.09	Sebastian Coe; Great Britain	1:44.76
1500 metres	Steve Ovett; Great Britain	3:35.59 CR	Eamonn Coghlan; Ireland	3:36.57	David Moorcroft; Great Britain	3:36.70
5000 metres	Venanzio Ortis; Italy	13:28.57	Markus Ryffel; Switzerland; Aleksandr Fedotkin; Soviet Union	13:28.66		
10,000 metres	Martti Vainio; Finland	27:30.99 CR, NR	Venanzio Ortis; Italy	27:31.48	Aleksandras Antipovas; Soviet Union	27:31.50
Marathon	Leonid Moseyev; Soviet Union	2:11:57.5 CR	Nikolay Penzin; Soviet Union	2:11:59.0	Karel Lismont; Belgium	2:12:07.7
110 metres hurdles	Thomas Munkelt; East Germany	13.54	Jan Pusty; Poland	13.55	Arto Bryggare; Finland	13.56
400 metres hurdles	Harald Schmid; West Germany	48.51 CR	Dmitriy Stukalov; Soviet Union	49.72	Vasyl Arkhypenko; Soviet Union	49.77
3000 metres steeplechase	Bronislaw Malinowski; Poland	8:15.08	Patriz Ilg; West Germany	8:16.92	Ismo Toukonen; Finland	8:18.29
20 kilometres walk	Roland Wieser; East Germany	1:23:11.5 CR	Pyotr Pochynchuk; Soviet Union	1:23:43.0	Anatoliy Solomin; Soviet Union	1:24:11.5
50 kilometres walk	Jorge Llopart; Spain	3:53:29.9 CR	Veniamin Soldatenko; Soviet Union	3:55:12.1	Jan Ornoch; Poland	3:55:15.9
4 × 100 metres relay	Poland; Zenon Nowosz; Zenon Licznerski; Leszek Dunecki; Marian Woronin	38.58 CR	East Germany; Manfred Kokot; Eugen Ray; Olaf Prenzler; Alexander Thieme	38.78	Soviet Union; Sergey Vladimirtsev; Nikolay Kolesnikov; Aleksandr Aksinin; Vladimir Ignatenko	38.82
4 × 400 metres relay	West Germany; Martin Weppler; Franz-Peter Hofmeister; Bernd Herrmann; Harald Schmid	3:02.03 CR	Poland; Jerzy Włodarczyk; Zbigniew Jaremski; Cezary Łapiński; Ryszard Podlas	3:03.62	Czechoslovakia; Josef Lomický; František Brečka; Miroslav Tulis; Karel Kolář	3:04.99

- ^{nb1} Pietro Mennea ran 10.19 in the heats, which was a new championship record.

=== Field ===
1971 |1974 |1978 |1982 |1986 |

Event	Gold		Silver		Bronze	
High jump	Vladimir Yashchenko; Soviet Union	2.30 m CR	Aleksandr Grigoryev; Soviet Union	2.28 m	Rolf Beilschmidt; East Germany	2.28 m
Pole vault	Vladimir Trofimenko; Soviet Union	5.55 m CR	Antti Kalliomäki; Finland	5.50 m	Rauli Pudas; Finland	5.45 m
Long jump	Jacques Rousseau; France	8.18 m CR	Nenad Stekić; Yugoslavia	8.12 m	Vladimir Tsepelyov; Soviet Union	8.01 m
Triple jump	Miloš Srejović; Yugoslavia	16.94 m	Viktor Saneyev; Soviet Union	16.93 m	Anatoliy Piskulin; Soviet Union	16.87 m
^{†}Shot put	Udo Beyer; East Germany	21.08 m =CR	Aleksandr Baryshnikov; Soviet Union	20.68 m	Wolfgang Schmidt; East Germany	20.30 m
Discus throw	Wolfgang Schmidt; East Germany	66.82 m CR	Markku Tuokko; Finland	64.90 m	Imrich Bugár; Czechoslovakia	64.66 m
Hammer throw	Yuriy Sedykh; Soviet Union	77.28 m CR	Roland Steuk; East Germany	77.24 m	Karl-Hans Riehm; West Germany	77.02 m
Javelin throw	Michael Wessing; West Germany	89.12 m	Nikolay Grebniev; Soviet Union	87.82 m	Wolfgang Hanisch; East Germany	87.66 m
Decathlon	Aleksandr Grebenyuk; Soviet Union	8340 pts CR	Daley Thompson; Great Britain	8289 pts	Siegfried Stark; East Germany	8208 pts

^{†}: In shot put, Yevgeniy Mironov initially finished second (20.87m), but was disqualified for an infringement of IAAF doping rules.

== Women's results ==
=== Track ===
1971 |1974 |1978 |1982 |1986 |

Event	Gold		Silver		Bronze	
100 metres	Marlies Göhr; East Germany	11.13 =CR	Linda Haglund; Sweden	11.29	Lyudmila Maslakova; Soviet Union	11.31
200 metres	Lyudmila Kondratyeva; Soviet Union	22.52	Marlies Göhr; East Germany	22.53	Carla Bodendorf; East Germany	22.64
400 metres	Marita Koch; East Germany	48.94 WR – CR	Christina Brehmer; East Germany	50.38	Irena Szewińska; Poland	50.40
800 metres	Tatyana Providokhina; Soviet Union	1:55.80 CR	Nadezhda Mushta; Soviet Union	1:55.82	Zoya Rigel; Soviet Union	1:56.57
1500 metres	Giana Romanova; Soviet Union	3:59.01 CR	Natalia Mărășescu; Romania	3:59.77	Totka Petrova; Bulgaria	4:00.15
3000 metres	Svetlana Ulmasova; Soviet Union	8:33.16 CR	Natalia Mărășescu; Romania	8:33.53	Grete Waitz; Norway	8:34.33
100 metres hurdles^{[nb1]}	Johanna Klier; East Germany	12.62	Tatyana Anisimova; Soviet Union	12.67	Gudrun Berend; East Germany	12.73
400 metres hurdles	Tatyana Zelentsova; Soviet Union	54.89	Silvia Hollmann; West Germany	55.14	Karin Roßley; East Germany	55.36
4 × 100 metres relay	Vera Anisimova; Lyudmila Maslakova; Lyudmila Kondratyeva; Lyudmila Storozhkova; Soviet Union	42.54	Beverley Goddard; Kathy Smallwood; Sharon Colyear; Sonia Lannaman; Great Britain	42.72	Johanna Klier; Monika Hamann; Carla Bodendorf; Marlies Göhr; East Germany	43.07
4 × 400 metres relay	Christiane Marquardt; Barbara Krug; Christina Brehmer; Marita Koch; East Germany	3:21.20 CR	Tatyana Prorochenko; Nadezhda Mushta; Tatyana Providokhina; Mariya Kulchunova; Soviet Union	3:22.53	Małgorzata Grajewska; Krystyna Kacperczyk; Genowefa Błaszak; Irena Szewińska; Poland	3:26.76

- ^{nb1} Grażyna Rabsztyn (Poland), who was disqualified in the final, ran a championship record of 12.60 in the semifinal.

=== Field ===
1971 |1974 |1978 |1982 |1986 |

Event	Gold		Silver		Bronze	
High jump	Sara Simeoni; Italy	2.01 m WR= – CR	Rosemarie Ackermann; East Germany	1.99 m	Brigitte Holzapfel; West Germany	1.95 m
Long jump^{[nb1]}	Vilma Bardauskienė; Soviet Union	6.88 m	Angela Voigt; East Germany	6.79 m	Jarmila Nygrýnová; Czechoslovakia	6.69 m
Shot put	Ilona Slupianek; East Germany	21.41 m CR	Helena Fibingerová; Czechoslovakia	20.86 m	Margitta Droese; East Germany	20.58 m
Discus throw	Evelin Jahl; East Germany	66.98 m	Margitta Droese; East Germany	64.04 m	Natalya Gorbachova; Soviet Union	63.58 m
Javelin throw	Ruth Fuchs; East Germany	69.16 m CR	Tessa Sanderson; Great Britain	62.40 m	Ute Hommola; East Germany	62.32 m
^{‡}Pentathlon	Margit Papp; Hungary	4655 pts	Burglinde Pollak; East Germany	4600 pts	Kristine Nitzsche; East Germany	4599 pts

^{‡}: In pentathlon, Nadiya Tkachenko (URS) initially finished 1st (4744pts), but was disqualified for an infringement of IAAF doping rules.

- ^{nb1} Vilma Bardauskienė broke the world record with a jump 7.09 metres in the qualification round.

== Medal table ==
* Host nation (Czechoslovakia)

Rank	Nation	Gold	Silver	Bronze	Total
1	Soviet Union (URS)	12	12	10	34
2	East Germany (GDR)	12	10	11	33
3	West Germany (FRG)	4	2	2	8
4	Italy (ITA)	4	1	0	5
5	Poland (POL)	2	2	3	7
6	Great Britain (GBR)	1	4	2	7
7	Finland (FIN)	1	2	3	6
8	Yugoslavia (YUG)	1	1	0	2
9	France (FRA)	1	0	1	2
10	Hungary (HUN)	1	0	0	1
10	Spain (ESP)	1	0	0	1
12	Czechoslovakia (TCH)*	0	2	3	5
13	Romania (ROU)	0	2	0	2
14	Switzerland (SUI)	0	1	1	2
15	Ireland (IRL)	0	1	0	1
15	Sweden (SWE)	0	1	0	1
17	Belgium (BEL)	0	0	1	1
17	Bulgaria (BUL)	0	0	1	1
17	Norway (NOR)	0	0	1	1
Totals (19 entries)		40	41	39	120

== Participation ==
According to an unofficial count, 847 athletes from 30 countries participated in the event, 157 athletes less than the official number of 1004, and one country more than the official number of 29 as published. The significantly higher official number might include coaches and/or officials.

- Austria (11)
- Belgium (31)
- Bulgaria (24)
- Cyprus (1)
- Czechoslovakia (82)
- Denmark (10)
- East Germany (72)
- Finland (33)
- France (51)
- Gibraltar (1)
- Great Britain (69)
- Greece (13)
- Hungary (25)
- Iceland (5)
- Ireland (9)
- Italy (43)
- Liechtenstein (2)
- Luxembourg (6)
- Netherlands (25)
- Norway (16)
- Poland (46)
- Portugal (4)
- Romania (24)
- Soviet Union (92)
- Spain (16)
- Sweden (31)
- Switzerland (21)
- Turkey (5)
- West Germany (64)
- Yugoslavia (14)
