= Vsevolozhsk constituency =

Russian legislative constituency

Vsevolozhsk single-member constituency
- Constituency of the Russian State Duma
- Deputy: Svetlana Zhurova; United Russia
- Federal subject: Leningrad Oblast
- Districts: Priozersky, Vsevolozhsky (Agalatovo, Bugry, Dubrovka, Koltushi, Kuyvozi, Kuzmolovsky, Imeni Morozova, Murino, Novoye Devyatkino, Rakhya, Romanovka, Sertolovo, Shcheglovo, Toksovo, Verkhniye Oselki, Vsevolozhsk, Yukki), Vyborgsky
- Voters: 483,444 (2026)

The Vsevolozhsk constituency (No.112 (Note: No.101 in 1993-1995, No.99 in 1995-2003, No.100 in 2003-2007, No.111 in 2016–2026)) is a Russian legislative constituency in Leningrad Oblast. The constituency covers northern Leningrad Oblast as well as northern and north-eastern suburbs of Saint Petersburg.

The constituency has been represented since 2021 by United Russia deputy Svetlana Zhurova, five-term State Duma member and 2006 Olympic speed skater, who won the open seat after defeating one-term United Russia incumbent Vladimir Drachev in the primary.

== Boundaries ==
1993–1995: Ivangorod, Kingiseppsky District, Lomonosovsky District, Luzhsky District, Priozersky District, Slantsevsky District, Sosnovy Bor, Volosovsky District, Vsevolozhsk, Vsevolozhsky District, Vyborg, Vyborgsky District
The constituency covered northern and western Leningrad Oblast, connected only through the Gulf of Finland, including the cities of Ivangorod, Sosnovy Bor, Vsevolozhsk and Vyborg.

1995–2007: Kirovsky District, Koltushi, Kuznechnoye, Priozersky District, Sertolovo, Shlisselburg, Svetogorsk, Vsevolozhsk, Vsevolozhsky District, Vyborg, Vyborgsky District
The constituency was heavily altered following the 1995 redistricting as Leningrad Oblast gained a third district. Western Leningrad Oblast portion of this seat became the basis for new Kingisepp constituency, while northern Leningrad Oblast remained in the former constituency. This seat also gained Kirovsky District from the Volkhov constituency.

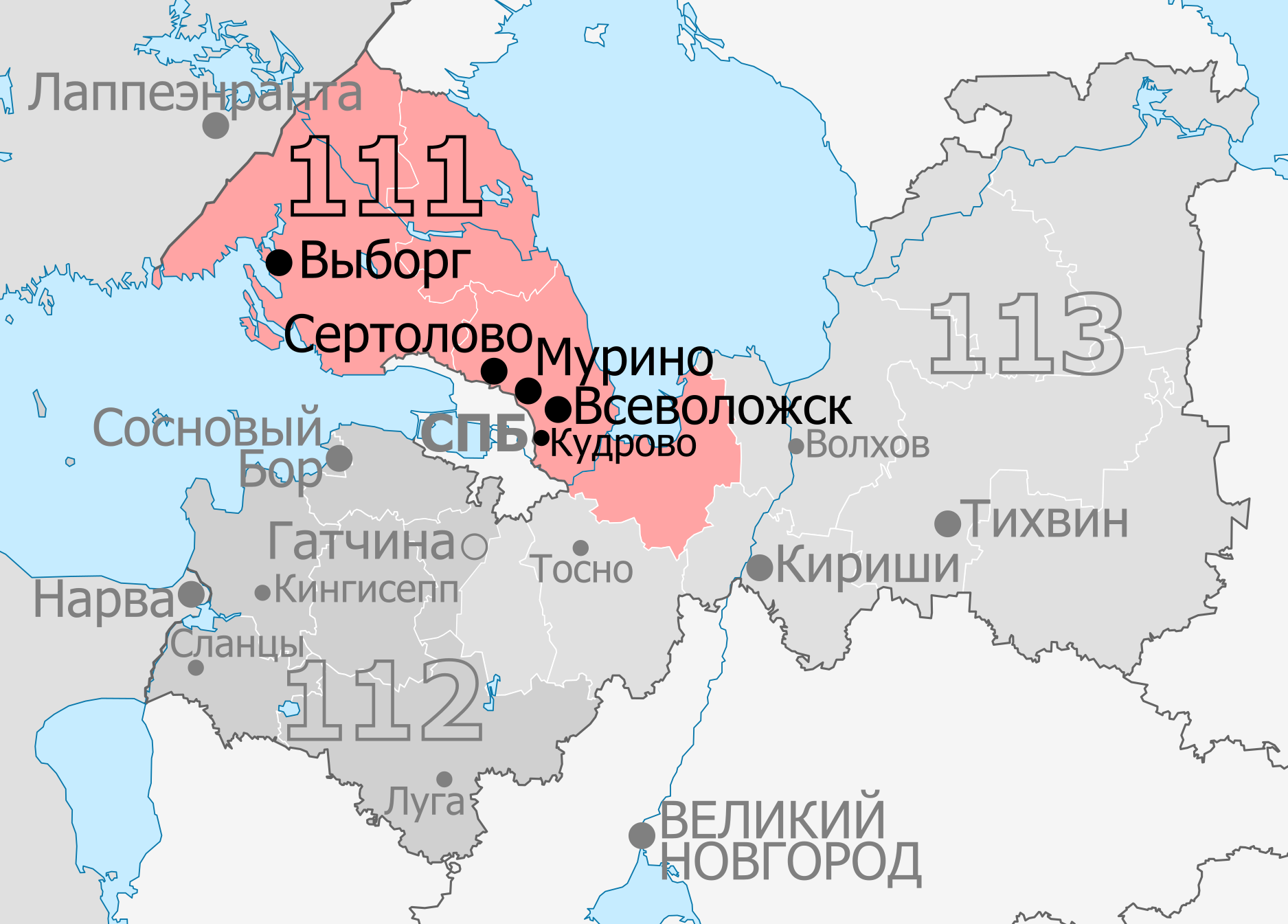
Constituency boundaries from 2016 to 2026

2016–2026: Kirovsky District, Priozersky District, Vsevolozhsky District, Vyborgsky District
The constituency was re-created for the 2016 election and retained all of its former territory.

2026–present: Priozersky District, Vsevolozhsky District (Agalatovo, Bugry, Dubrovka, Koltushi, Kuyvozi, Kuzmolovsky, Imeni Morozova, Murino, Novoye Devyatkino, Rakhya, Romanovka, Sertolovo, Shcheglovo, Toksovo, Verkhniye Oselki, Vsevolozhsk, Yukki), Vyborgsky District
After the 2025 redistricting the constituency was significantly changed due to growth in Saint Petersburg eastern suburbs. The constituency lost Kirovsky District and a small portion of Vsevolozhsky District (including the megasuburb Kudrovo) to Volkhov constituency.

== Members elected ==
Election	Member	Party
1993	Yevgeny Fyodorov	Russian Democratic Reform Movement
1995	Vladimir Grigoryev	Communists and Working Russia - for the Soviet Union
1999	A by-election was scheduled after Against all line received the most votes	
2000	Aleksandr Nevzorov	Independent
2003	Aleksandr Nevzorov	Independent
2007	Proportional representation - no election by constituency	
2011	Proportional representation - no election by constituency	
2016	Vladimir Drachev	United Russia
2021	Svetlana Zhurova	United Russia
2026	Svetlana Zhurova	United Russia

== Election results ==
=== 1993 ===
Summary of the 12 December 1993 Russian legislative election in the Vsevolozhsk constituency
Candidate	Party	Votes	%
Yevgeny Fyodorov	Russian Democratic Reform Movement	63,987	17.97%
Aleksandr Arkhishin	Yavlinsky–Boldyrev–Lukin	43,984	12.35%
Vitaly Klimov	Independent	35,198	9.88%
Rashid Ismagilov	Choice of Russia	34,061	9.56%
Stepan Kolomeytsev	Civic Union	29,374	8.25%
Nikolay Dmitriyev	Agrarian Party	19,461	5.46%
against all		96,699	27.15%
Total		356,172	100%

=== 1995 ===
Summary of the 17 December 1995 Russian legislative election in the Vsevolozhsk constituency
Candidate	Party	Votes	%
Vladimir Grigoryev	Communists and Working Russia - for the Soviet Union	27,963	10.08%
Anatoly Kalinin	Congress of Russian Communities	22,449	8.09%
Yury Alferov	Independent	21,201	7.64%
Vitaly Stepanko	Our Home – Russia	19,722	7.11%
Yevgeny Fyodorov (incumbent)	Bloc of Independents	19,228	6.93%
Valery Shkoldin	Independent	18,322	6.60%
Svetlana Yurkova	Independent	15,340	5.53%
Aleksandr Permyakov	Independent	15,045	5.42%
Vladimir Lebedev	Power to the People!	11,664	4.20%
Lyudmila Chayka	Christian-Democratic Union - Christians of Russia	11,409	4.11%
Vyacheslav Ulybin	Liberal Democratic Party	11,325	4.08%
Viktor Denikin	Union of Patriots	9,987	3.60%
Galina Oksyutnik	Ivan Rybkin Bloc	8,373	3.02%
Aleksey Maksimenkov	Independent	7,340	2.65%
Yevgeny Polyakov	Russian All-People's Movement	3,645	1.31%
Aleksey Redozubov	Independent	3,603	1.30%
against all		41,287	14.88%
Total		277,484	100%

=== 1999 ===
A by-election was scheduled after Against all line received the most votes.

Summary of the 19 December 1999 Russian legislative election in the Vsevolozhsk constituency
Candidate	Party	Votes	%
Olga Borisova	Independent	34,319	14.54%
Sergey Kyshtymov	Independent	29,236	12.38%
Vladimir Grigoryev (incumbent)	Communists and Workers of Russia - for the Soviet Union	26,044	11.03%
Aleksandr Trafimov	Independent	22,204	9.40%
Viktor Pleskachevsky	Unity	17,031	7.21%
Boris Moiseyev	Yabloko	13,696	5.80%
Aleksandr Lysov	Independent	11,208	4.75%
Viktor Rybachok	Independent	9,976	4.23%
Oleg Shelyagov	Independent	6,621	2.80%
Rashid Ismagilov	Independent	6,180	2.62%
Valery Grigoryev	Liberal Democratic Party	4,996	2.12%
Dmitry Yakubovsky	Independent	4,787	2.03%
Vladislav Kosenko	Spiritual Heritage	4,047	1.71%
Taras Dzhus	Independent	3,154	1.34%
Valery Gerasimov	Socialist Party	1,232	0.52%
Aleksandr Vtulkin	Independent	1,137	0.48%
Vadim Raskovalov	Russian Socialist Party	777	0.33%
against all		34,783	14.73%
Total		236,106	100%

=== 2000 ===
Summary of the 26 March 2000 by-election in the Vsevolozhsk constituency
Candidate	Party	Votes	%
Aleksandr Nevzorov	Independent	116,258	38.07%
Yury Fedotov	Independent	54,410	17.82%
Yury Trusov	Independent	1,558	6.81%
Yury Sevenard	Independent	18,773	6.15%
Anatoly Smirnov	Independent	15,365	5.03%
Vladimir Grigoryev	Independent	12,545	4.11%
Gennady Seleznev	Independent	10,652	3.49%
Mikhail Glushchenko	Independent	4,406	1.44%
Galina Sharova	Independent	3,592	1.18%
Oleg Shelyagov	Independent	2,698	0.88%
Anton Volkov	Independent	2,168	0.71%
Rudolf Kagramanov	Independent	1,104	0.36%
Vyacheslav Shevchenko	Independent	601	0.20%
against all		35,266	11.55%
Total		303,209	100%

=== 2003 ===
Summary of the 7 December 2003 Russian legislative election in the Vsevolozhsk constituency
Candidate	Party	Votes	%
Aleksandr Nevzorov (incumbent)	Independent	37,904	18.58%
Zalina Medoyeva	Union of Right Forces	28,501	13.97%
Vyacheslav Arutyunov	Independent	17,642	8.65%
Olga Borisova	Independent	16,820	8.24%
Anatoly Kontashev	Independent	14,388	7.05%
Irina Tomason	Independent	11,274	5.53%
Damir Shadayev	Liberal Democratic Party	11,260	5.52%
Mikhail Aleksandrov	Rodina	11,257	5.52%
Yury Terentyev	Russian Communist Workers Party — Russian Party of Communists	10,990	5.39%
Yelena Slepko	Agrarian Party	6,068	2.97%
Nikolay Prokudin	Yabloko	5,378	2.64%
Viktor Stepanov	United Russian Party Rus'	1,386	0.68%
against all		27,712	13.58%
Total		204,222	100%

=== 2016 ===
Summary of the 18 September 2016 Russian legislative election in the Vsevolozhsk constituency
Candidate	Party	Votes	%
Vladimir Drachev	United Russia	100,133	47.64%
Andrey Lebedev	Liberal Democratic Party	23,415	11.14%
Valeria Kovalenko	A Just Russia	22,260	10.59%
Vladimir Taymazov	Communist Party	13,415	6.38%
Lyudmila Savina	Communists of Russia	10,074	4.79%
Aleksey Etmanov	Yabloko	8,569	3.48%
Vladimir Popov	Party of Growth	7,322	3.48%
Larisa Larkina	The Greens	5,971	2.84%
Anastasia Zatochnaya	Rodina	5,791	2.75%
Tatyana Lepetenina	Civic Platform	3,100	1.47%
Total		210,208	100%

=== 2021 ===
Summary of the 17-19 September 2021 Russian legislative election in the Vsevolozhsk constituency
Candidate	Party	Votes	%
Svetlana Zhurova	United Russia	101,200	43.20%
Vadim Budeyev	Communist Party	40,597	17.33%
Valeria Kovalenko	A Just Russia — For Truth	20,929	8.93%
Andrey Lebedev	Liberal Democratic Party	13,249	5.66%
Aleksey Shurshikov	New People	12,131	5.18%
Vasily Ivanov	Party of Pensioners	11,726	5.01%
Lyudmila Savina	Communists of Russia	9,100	3.88%
Anton Gordyuk	Yabloko	6,468	2.76%
Valery Shinkarenko	Rodina	4,174	1.78%
Aleksandr Gabitov	Civic Platform	3,141	1.34%
Total		234,241	100%

=== 2026 ===
Summary of the 18-20 September 2026 Russian legislative election in the Vsevolozhsk constituency
Candidate	Party	Votes	%
Svetlana Zhurova (incumbent)	United Russia	177,762	63.14%
Andrey Lebedev	Liberal Democratic Party	32,588	11.58%
Larisa Mukhina	Communist Party	20,836	7.40%
Valeria Kovalenko	A Just Russia	11,250	4.00%
Timur Machitidze	New People	10,943	3.89%
Ilya Kiselyov	Yabloko	9,365	3.33%
Vyacheslav Gumerov	Communists of Russia	8,573	3.05%
Natalya Podolskaya	The Greens	5,550	1.97%
Total		281,528	100%
