= Imeni Morozova =

Imeni Morozova имени Морозова
- Urban-type settlement
- Interactive map of Imeni Morozova
- Location of Imeni Morozova Imeni Morozova (Leningrad Oblast)
- Coordinates: 59°58′30″N 31°02′15″E
- Country: Russia
- Federal subject: Leningrad Oblast
- Administrative district: Vsevolozhsky District

Population (2010 Census)
  - Total: 10,873
  - Estimate (2024): 10,350 (−4.8%)

Municipal status
  - Municipal district: Vsevolozhsky Municipal District
  - Urban settlement: Morozovskoye Urban Settlement
  - Capital of: Morozovskoye Urban Settlement
- Time zone: UTC+3 (MSK)
- Postal code: 188679
- OKTMO ID: 41212563000
- Website: www.adminmgp.ru

Imeni Morozova (Russian: и́мени Моро́зова) is an urban locality (an urban-type settlement) in Vsevolozhsky District of Leningrad Oblast, Russia, located on the bank of Lake Ladoga by the source of the Neva River, northeast of Saint Petersburg. Municipally it is incorporated as Morozovskoye Urban Settlement, one of the eight urban settlements in the district. Population: 10,873 (2010 census); 10,677 (2002 census); 12,347 (1989 Soviet census).

== History ==
In the end of the 19th century, the area where the settlement was currently located was occupied by the datcha (a summer estate) by Vladimir Rennenkampf. In 1882, the lands were given on lease to Vladimir Ronchevsky to build the Shlisselburg Gunpowder Plant, which started operation in 1883. Imeni Morozova developed as a settlement serving the plant. At the time, it belonged to Shlisselburgsky Uyezd of Saint Petersburg Governorate. In 1913, the governorate was renamed Petrograd. On February 14, 1923 Shlisselburgsky Uyezd was merged into Petrogradsky Uyezd. In January, 1924 the uyezd and the governorate were renamed Leningradsky.

In 1922, the gunpowder plant was renamed Imeni Morozova Plant, for Nikolay Morozov. The settlement was renamed as well, and it was administratively subordinated to the town of Shlisselburg.

On August 1, 1927, the uyezds were abolished and Leninsky District, with the administrative center in the settlement of Vsevolozhskoye, was established. The governorates were also abolished, and the district was a part of Leningrad Okrug of Leningrad Oblast. On August 19, 1930 Leninsky District was abolished and merged into newly established Leningradsky Prigorodny District with the administrative center in the city of Leningrad. On August 10, 1934 Imeni Morozova was detached from the town of Shlisselburg (which was the town of oblast significance and not a part of the district) and transferred to Leningradsky Prigorodny District. On August 19, 1936 Leningradsky Prigorodny District was abolished, and Vsevolozhsky District, with the administrative center in Vsevolozhskoye, was established. Imeni Morozova became a part of Vsevolozhsky District.

During World War II, Imeni Morozova was not occupied and played a key role in channeling supplies to the city of Leningrad. In particular, a temporary bridge over the Neva was built south of the settlement and was used for the transport of goods.

== Economy ==
=== Industry ===
The settlement was created to serve the Shlisselburg Gunpowder Plant, however, the plant went bankrupt in the 1990s. Some parts of the plant are still in operation, producing electrotechnical equipment and plastic goods. There are also food industry enterprises.

=== Transportation ===
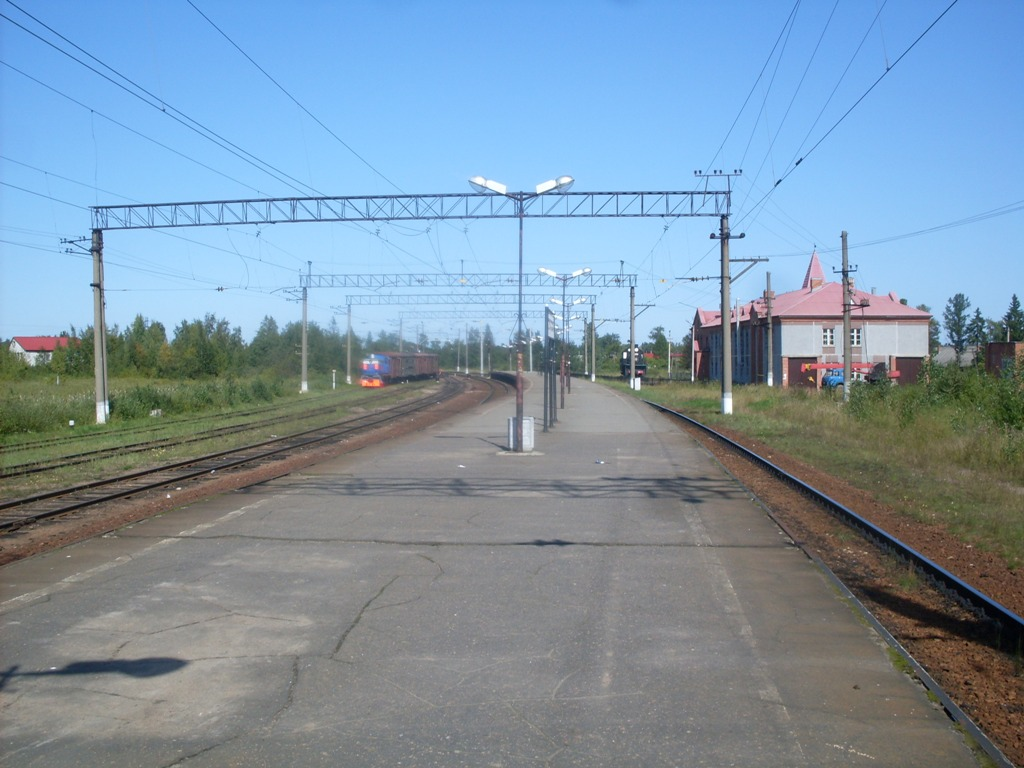
Petrokrepost railway station

Imeni Morozova is located on the railway connecting Saint Petersburg with Nevskaya Dubrovka railway station via Vsevolozhsk. The settlement has two railway stations, 21 km and Petrokrepost. There is suburban service to the Finland Station in Saint Petersburg.

Imeny Morozova is connected by roads with Vsevolozhsk and Rakhya, and has access to the M18 highway, which connects Saint Petersburg with Murmansk via Petrozavodsk.

The Neva is navigable.

== Culture and recreation ==
Imeni Morozova contains two cultural heritage monuments of federal significance and additionally five objects classified as cultural and historical heritage of local significance. These are related to the Road of Life, which was connecting Leningrad with the rest of Soviet Union during the Siege of Leningrad in 1941—1944.
