= Rakhya =

Rakhya Рахья
- Urban-type settlement
- Flag
- Interactive map of Rakhya
- Location of Rakhya Rakhya (Leningrad Oblast)
- Coordinates: 60°05′25″N 30°50′15″E
- Country: Russia
- Federal subject: Leningrad Oblast
- Administrative district: Vsevolozhsky District

Population (2010 Census)
  - Total: 3,188
  - Estimate (2024): 3,773 (+18.4%)

Municipal status
  - Municipal district: Vsevolozhsky Municipal District
  - Urban settlement: Rakhyinskoye Urban Settlement
  - Capital of: Rakhyinskoye Urban Settlement
- Time zone: UTC+3 (MSK)
- Postal code: 188671
- OKTMO ID: 41612167051
- Website: www.rakhya.ru

Rakhya (Rahja, Russian: Рахья) is an urban locality (an urban-type settlement) in Vsevolozhsky District of Leningrad Oblast, Russia, located on the Karelian Isthmus northeast of Saint Petersburg. Municipally it is incorporated as Rakhyinskoye Urban Settlement, one of the eight urban settlements in the district. Population: 3,188 (2010 census); 3,156 (2002 census); 3,316 (1989 Soviet census).

== History ==
In the end of the 19th century, Pavel Korf bought lands which currently belong to the settlement, for peat production. The closest village was Irinovka. In 1892, the first narrow-gauge railroad in Russia was constructed to transport peat. Torfyanaya railway station was open in the current area of the settlement (the name Torfyanaya originates from Russian torf, for peat). The settlement around the station for a long time did not have any name and was known as the Settlement No. 1. In 1911, the production stopped, and in 1913 Korf died. The station was located in Shlisselburgsky Uyezd of Saint Petersburg Governorate (since 1913, Petrograd Governorate).

The peat production resumed in the 1920s. In 1922, Torfyanaya railway station was renamed Rakhya railway station, to commemorate Jukka Rahja, a Russian-Finnish Bolshevik killed in Kuusinen Club Incident in 1920. On February 14, 1923 Shlisselburgsky Uyezd was merged into Petrogradsky Uyezd. In January, 1924 the uyezd and the governorate were renamed Leningradsky.

On August 1, 1927, the uyezds were abolished and Leninsky District, with the administrative center in the settlement of Vsevolozhskoye, was established. The governorates were also abolished, and the district was a part of Leningrad Okrug of Leningrad Oblast. On August 19, 1930 Leninsky District was abolished and merged into newly established Leningradsky Prigorodny District with the administrative center in the city of Leningrad. On August 19, 1936 Leningradsky Prigorodny District was abolished, and Vsevolozhsky District, with the administrative center in Vsevolozhskoye, was established. In 1946, the settlement around Rakhya railway station was made an urban-type settlement and officially received the name of Rakhya.

== Economy ==
=== Industry ===
Currently, the main industrial enterprise in Rakhya is a paint-producing plant. The peat production has been discontinued.

=== Transportation ===
Rakhya is located on the railway connecting Saint Petersburg with Ladozhskoye Ozero railway station via Vsevolozhsk. There is suburban service to the Finland Station in Saint Petersburg.

Rakhya is connected by road with Vsevolozhsk and Kirovsk and has access to the M18 highway connecting Saint Petersburg and Murmansk.

== Culture and recreation ==
Rakhya contains four objects classified as cultural and historical heritage of local significance. They commemorate events of the World War II. Many monuments in the localities administratively subordinated to Rakhya, such as Kokkorevo or Osinovets, commemorate the Road of Life, which during the Siege of Leningrad connected Leningrad with the rest of the Soviet Union.
