= Romanovka, Vsevolozhsky District, Leningrad Oblast =

Romanovka Романовка
- Settlement
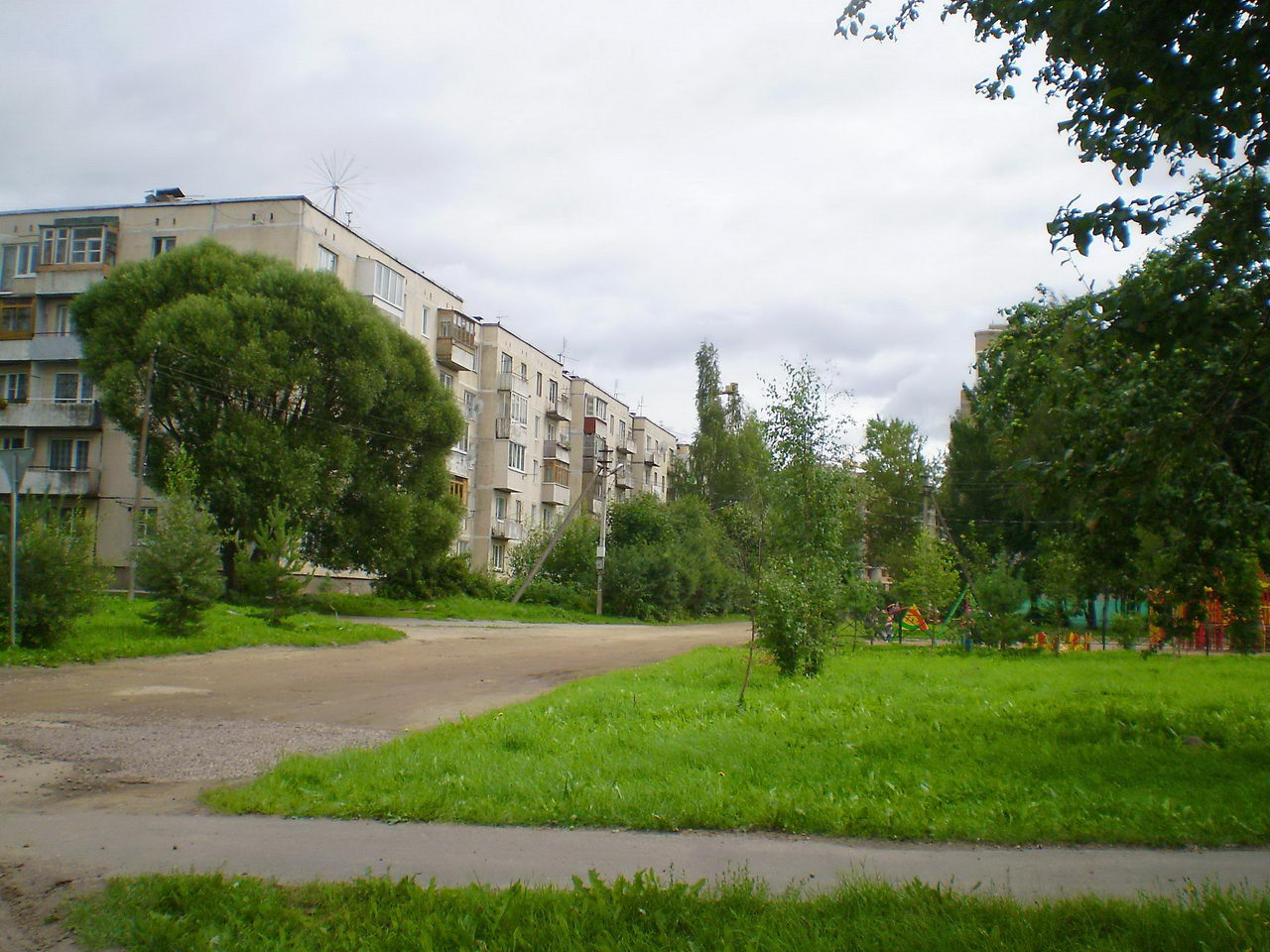
- Romanovka Settlement
- Interactive map of Romanovka
- Coordinates: 60.006°N 31.017°E
- Country: Russia
- Region: Leningrad Oblast
- District: Vsevolozhsky
- Rural Settlement: Romanovskoe
- Settlement: since 1995

Area
  - Total: 18,265.38 km^{2} (7,052.30 sq mi)
- Elevation: 59.5 m (195 ft)

Population
  - Total: 7,612 (2,012)
  - Density: 0.4167/km^{2} (1.079/sq mi)
- Time zone: UTC +4
- Area code: 47

Romanovka (Russian: Рома́новка, Finnish: Romanaisi) is a settlement and administrative center of the Romanovsky rural settlement of Vsevolozhsky District of Leningrad Oblast.

== History ==
Romanovka dates back to the beginning of the 18th century. The settlement was designated as Romanaisi on the Noterburgsky's map, drawn by P. Vasander in 1699. Gubki village belonged to the heirs of the deceased actual chamberlain Vsevolod Vsevolozhsky. The population in 1838 was 1404 men and 113 women. On the ethnographic map of St. Petersburg's Province by P.I. Koppen, 1849, Gubki is mentioned as "Huwa" village, inhabited by Ingrian–Savakotans. In the explanatory text to the ethnographic map, the population of the village named Huwa (Gubki and Romanivka) is specified as the following: Ingrian–Savakotons - 102 men, 189 women, Finns - 21 men, 24 women, all together 234 residents.

According to "The topographical map of parts of St. Petersburg and Vyborg Provinces" in 1860 adjacent villages Gubki and Romanivka had up to 18 peasant households each. On the plan of the general land surveying of the Shlisselburgsky district, they are mentioned as Gubkina and Romanovka villages. In 1862, Gubki was a possessory village, with the water supply system, 41 yards, population of 119 men, 105 women and volost board.

In 1885, according to the map of St.Petersburg Province, the village of Gubki had 105 yards. Gubki became a former possessory village in Ryabovsky volost, with 45 yards and population of 217 inhabitants. There was a school, a bench, a tavern, and an Orthodox church (3 versts away), as well as a glass plant (15 versts away).

In 1895, according to the map of the Shlisselburgsky district, Romanovka village had 29 country yards, and adjacent village Gubki had 26 yards. Gubki was the village, on the territory of Gubinsky rural community near the settlement of tenants under the name of Melnichny Ruchey.

In the 19th and the beginning of the 20th centuries, the village belonged to the Ryabovsky volost of the 2nd county of the Shlisselburgsky Uyezd of Saint Petersburg Governorate. Also, before the Revolution, there was a board of the Ryabovsky volost.

Romanovka became the village of the Romanovsky Village Council, had 45 farms, 199 people.

Gubki also became the village of the Romanovsky Village Council, and had 37 farms, 179 people In 1926, the Romanovsky Finnish national Village Council was established (Finns — 1692, Russians — 177, others national minorities — 68 people).

The villages were a part of the Village Council according to population census of 1926: Babino, Volchie Gory, Gubki, Kornevo, Melnichny Ruchey, Romanovka, Uglovo and Kornevo's railway station. According to administrative data of 1933, the villages belonged to the Romanovsky Finnish national Village Council: Melnichny Ruchey, Volchie Gory, Kornevo, Proba, Lepsara, Romanovka, Babino, Gubki, Uglovo, Pugarevo, Maloe Pugarevo, Kyasselevo, Rumbolovo and Radost settlement. The total population of the Village Council was 2821 people. According to administrative data of 1936, Romanovka village was the center of the Romanovsky Village Council of the Leningrad Oblast. In the Village Council there were 21 settlements, 767 farms and 9 collective farms.

By the beginning of the 1930es, Gubki and Romanovka had been designated on the maps separately. In 1939, Romanovka finally absorbed Gubki. BIG ROMANOVKA was the village of the Romanovsky Village Council, with 242 people. SMALL ROMANOVKA was the village of the Romanovsky Village Council, with 120 people. Gubki became the village of the Romanovsky Village Council, with 196 people in 1939.

The national Village Council was liquidated in the spring of 1939. The settlements were transferred to the Vaganovo and Shcheglovsky village councils, and also Vsevolozhsk settlement council. Until 1942 it was the place of residence for Ingermanlandish Finns. In 1942 all Finnish population of the village council was deported.

In 1946, as a result of the merge of the neighboring collective farms "Kornevo", "Puno-Tyakhti" (Red Star) and "Murros", "Romanovka" reproductive and pig-breeding state farm was established. In 194? — 1948 the pig-breeding complex was constructed in Romanovka.

In 1988, the memorial complex "280 meters of the "Road of Life", located in the village, was recognized as a historical monument.

According to 1990, Romanovka village was a part of the Shcheglovsky Village Council. In 1995, Kornevo and Romanovka villages were united in Romanovka settlement. In 2007, 5616 people lived in the settlement, in 2012 — 7612. An annual international winter marathon "Road of Life" on a distance of 10 km is held in Romanovka.

== Geography ==
Romanovka is located to the east of St. Petersburg on a way to Lake Ladoga, the 13th kilometer of the Road of Life (A128), three km away from Vsevolozhsk.
