= Okhta =

River in Leningrad Oblast, Russia

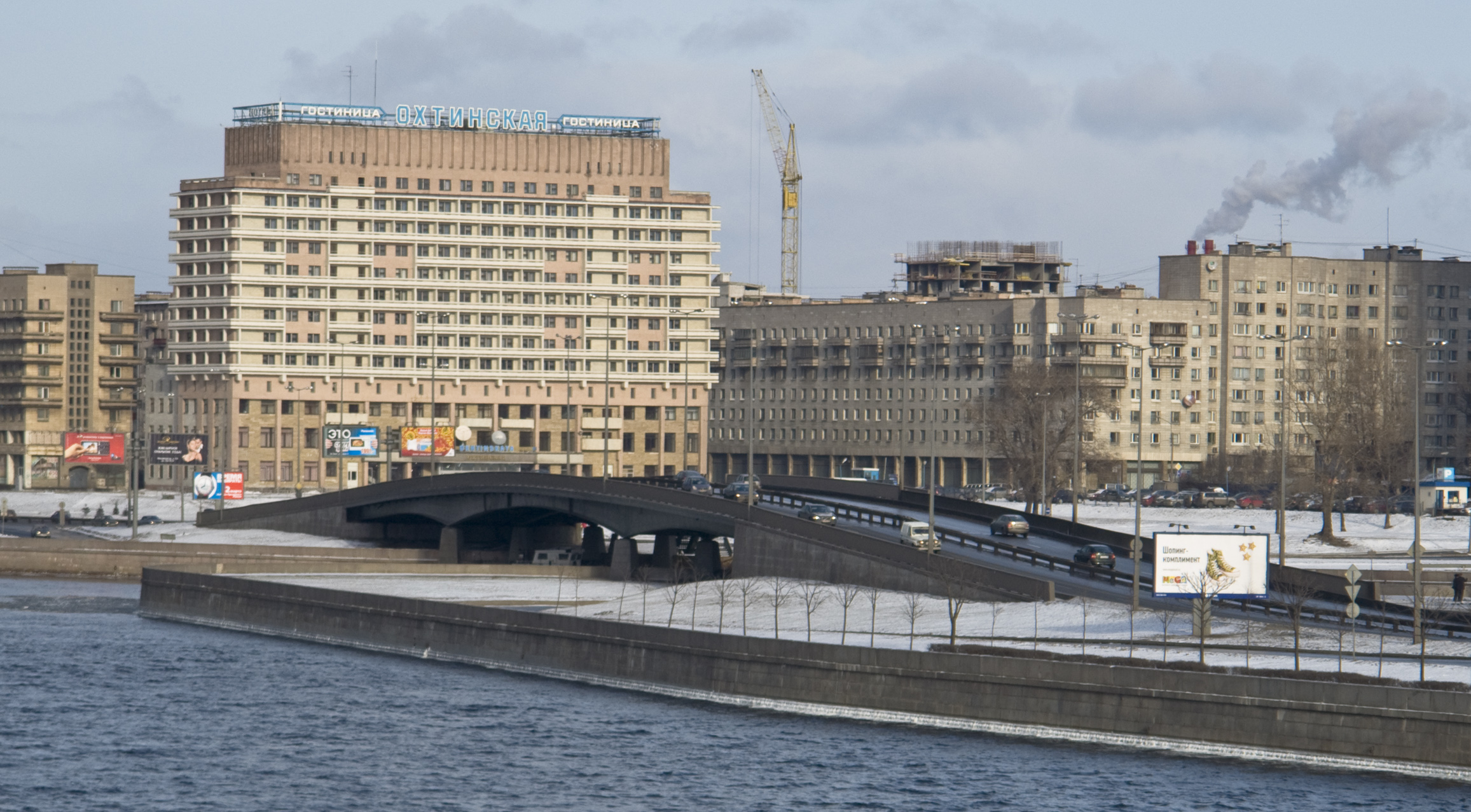
- Mouth of Okhta and the Malookhtinsky Bridge

Location
- Country: Russia

Physical characteristics
- Source
  - elevation: 130 m (430 ft)
- Mouth: Neva
  - coordinates: 59°56′45″N 30°24′27″E
- Length: 90 km (56 mi)
- Basin size: 768 km^{2} (297 sq mi)

Basin features
- Progression: Neva→ Gulf of Finland

The Okhta (Russian: Óхта) is a river in Vsevolozhsky District of Leningrad Oblast and the eastern part of the city of Saint Petersburg, Russia. It is the largest right tributary of the river Neva. It joins the Neva 12 kilometres (7.5 mi) upstream of the Neva's mouth, within the city limits of Saint Petersburg. The length of the Okhta is 90 kilometres (56 mi), and the area of its drainage basin is 768 square kilometres (297 mi^{2}). Its largest tributary is the Okkervil (left). The Rzhevsky Reservoir (5 kilometres (3.1 mi) long, 120 metres (390 ft) wide, with a volume of 4 mln m³) has been built on the Okhta. The Utkina Dacha estate is located on the banks of the Okhta close to the mouth of the Okkervil.

The source of the Okhta is in the swamps in the northwestern part of Vsevolozhsky District, north of the town of Sertolovo. The Okhta flows southeast, downstream of the settlement of Vartemyagi turns east, passes southwest of the urban-type settlement of Toksovo and turns south. Below Toksovo, it essentially flows through the suburbs of Saint Petersburg. Downstream of the town of Murino it enters the city of Saint Petersburg, passes Ladozhsky railway station and has its mouth under the Malookhtinsky Bridge, which separates Malookhtinskaya and Sverdlovskaya Embankments.

The drainage basin of the Okhta includes the south of the Karelian Isthmus. The town of Vsevolozhsk and the urban-type settlements of Toksovo and Kuzmolovsky are located in this river basin. Large lakes in the basin of the Okhta include Lake Kavgolovskoye and Lake Khepoyarvi.

== See also ==
- List of bridges in Saint Petersburg
