= Devyatkino =

Devyatkino is a locality near Saint Petersburg, Russia, and may refer to:

- Novoye Devyatkino (New Devyatkino) (Новое Девяткино) town in Novodevyatkinskogo rural settlement, Vsevolozhsky District
- Devyatkino (St. Petersburg Metro)
- Devyatkino (railroad station)
- Devyatkino (bus terminal)
