= Nevskaya Dubrovka =

Nevskaya Dubrovka Невская Дубровка
- Urban-type settlement
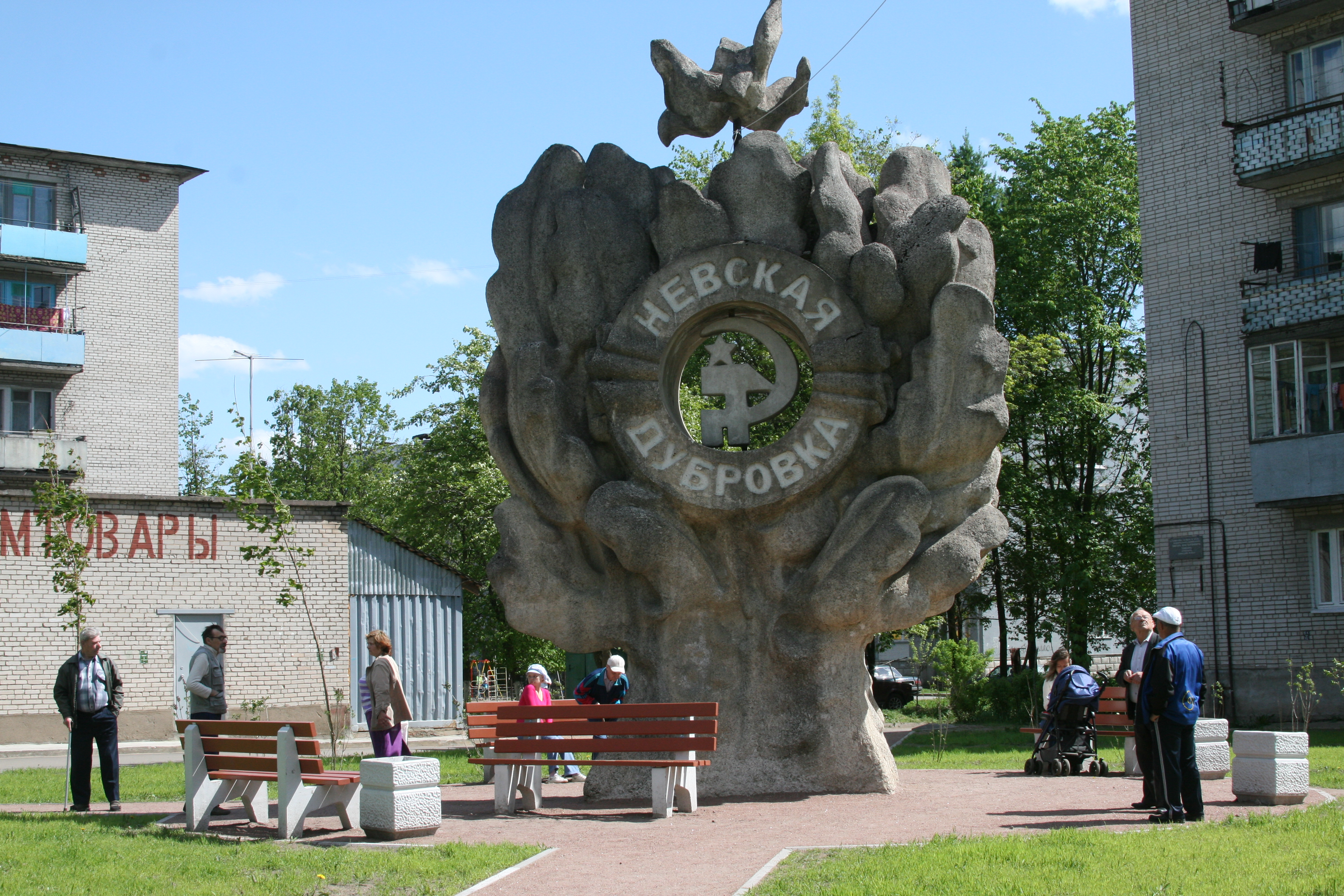

- Flag Coat of arms
- Interactive map of Nevskaya Dubrovka
- Location of Nevskaya Dubrovka Nevskaya Dubrovka (Leningrad Oblast)
- Coordinates: 59°50′30″N 30°56′10″E
- Country: Russia
- Federal subject: Leningrad Oblast
- Administrative district: Vsevolozhsky District

Population (2010 Census)
  - Total: 6,693
  - Estimate (2024): 7,820 (+16.8%)

Municipal status
  - Municipal district: Vsevolozhsky Municipal District
  - Urban settlement: Dubrovskoye Urban Settlement
  - Capital of: Dubrovskoye Urban Settlement
- Time zone: UTC+3 (MSK)
- Postal code: 188684
- OKTMO ID: 41612154051
- Website: ndubrovka.ru

Nevskaya Dubrovka (Russian: Невская Дубро́вка), before 2026 – Dubrovka, is an urban locality (an urban-type settlement) in Vsevolozhsky District of Leningrad Oblast, Russia, located on the right bank of the Neva River northeast of Saint Petersburg. Municipally it is incorporated as Dubrovskoye Urban Settlement, one of the eight urban settlements in the district. Population: 6,693 (2010 census); 5,432 (2002 census); 6,093 (1989 Soviet census).

== History ==
Historical affiliations

Grand Duchy of Moscow 1500–1547
Tsardom of Russia 1547–1583
Kingdom of Sweden 1583–1595
Tsardom of Russia 1595–1617
Kingdom of Sweden 1617–1721
Russian Empire 1721–1917
Russian Republic 1917
Soviet Russia 1917–1922
Soviet Union 1922–1991
Russian Federation 1991–present

The village of Dubrovo is known since 1500. By the 19th centuries, there were two villages, Vyborgskaya Dubrovka and Moskovskaya Dubrovka. In the end of the 19th century, it was a part of Shlisselburgsky Uyezd of Saint Petersburg Governorate (since 1914, Petrograd Governorate). On February 14, 1923 Shlisselburgsky Uyezd was merged into Petrogradsky Uyezd. In January 1924 the uyezd and the governorate were renamed Leningradsky. On May 26, 1927 Moskovskaya Dubrovka was granted urban-type settlement status and renamed Dubrovka.

On August 1, 1927, the uyezds were abolished and Leninsky District, with the administrative center in the settlement of Vsevolozhskoye, was established. The governorates were also abolished, and the district was a part of Leningrad Okrug of Leningrad Oblast. On July 23, 1930, the okrugs were abolished as well, and the districts were directly subordinated to the oblast. On August 19, 1930 Leninsky District was abolished and merged into newly established Leningradsky Prigorodny District with the administrative center in the city of Leningrad. On August 19, 1936 Leningradsky Prigorodny District was abolished, and the settlement was transferred into newly established Vsevolozhsky District, with the administrative center in the suburban settlement of Vsevolozhskoye. Dubrovka was destroyed by the German army in World War II.

In 2026 settlement was officially renamed Nevskaya Dubrovka.

== Economy ==
=== Industry ===
Nevskaya Dubrovka has a number of industrial enterprises, in particular, of chemical and construction industries.

=== Transportation ===
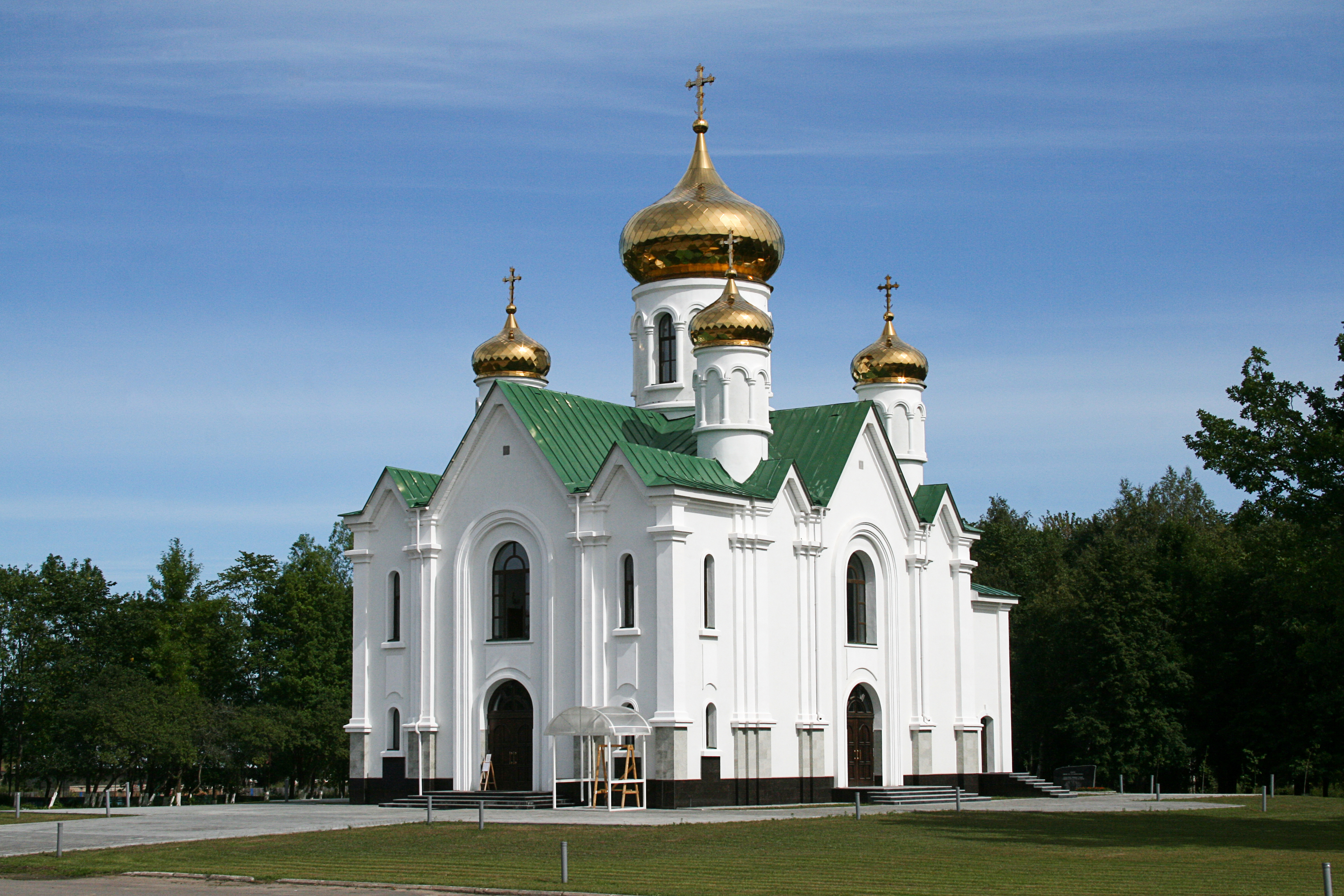
An orthodox church

Dubrovka has the terminal station (Nevskaya Dubrovka station) on the railway from Saint Petersburg via Vsevolozhsk. Another station, 37 km, is located within the limits of the settlement as well. There is suburban service to the Finland Station in Saint Petersburg.

The settlement has a road access to the M18 highway which connects Saint Petersburg and Murmansk via Petrozavodsk.

The Neva river is navigable.

== Culture and recreation ==
The district six objects classified as cultural and historical heritage of local significance. They commemorate the events of the Siege of Leningrad, when the front line was running on the Neva River, and Dubrovka was on the Soviet Army defense line. Soviet troops twice held the Nevsky Pyatachok, a tiny area on the left bank of the Neva opposite to Dubrovka, for an extended time in hope to develop a massive offensive.

The museum of the Nevsky Pyatachok is located in Dubrovka.
