= Diana Loginova =

Russian singer (born 2007)

- Диана Логинова
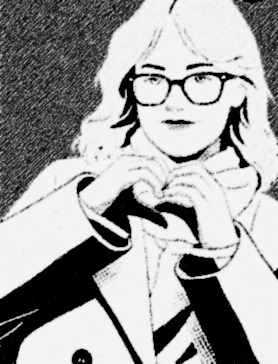
- Born: Diana Germanovna Loginova; 10 March 2007 (age 19); Rakhya, Vsevolozhsky District, Leningrad Oblast, Russia
- Other name: Naoko
- Occupations: street musician pianist singer keyboardist
- Years active: since 2025

Diana Germanovna Loginova (Russian: Диа́на Ге́рмановна Ло́гинова; born 10 March 2007) is a Russian singer performing under the stage name Naoko and frontwoman of the band Stoptime. She gained her greatest fame in October 2025, when she was arrested for performing songs by artists banned in Russia on the streets of St. Petersburg.

== Biography ==
Her mother's name is Irina. Diana has been involved in music since childhood. She is a piano student at the Rimsky-Korsakov College of Music. Diana has won numerous prestigious awards — 2024, she won the Polyphonics International Competition of Contemporary Sacred and Polyphonic Music Performers, and 2025, she won a prize at the Russian Student Spring All-Russian Festival. Loginova previously performed as part of the band NeXti.

Diana lives in the urban-type settlement Rakhya.

Loginova and the guitarist from the Stoptime band, Alexander Orlov, got engaged while in police custody. Alexander proposed to Diana in a police van shortly after their initial arrest in St. Petersburg on 17 October 2025. He made a makeshift engagement ring out of a napkin from a cigarette box.

== Arrest and criminal case ==
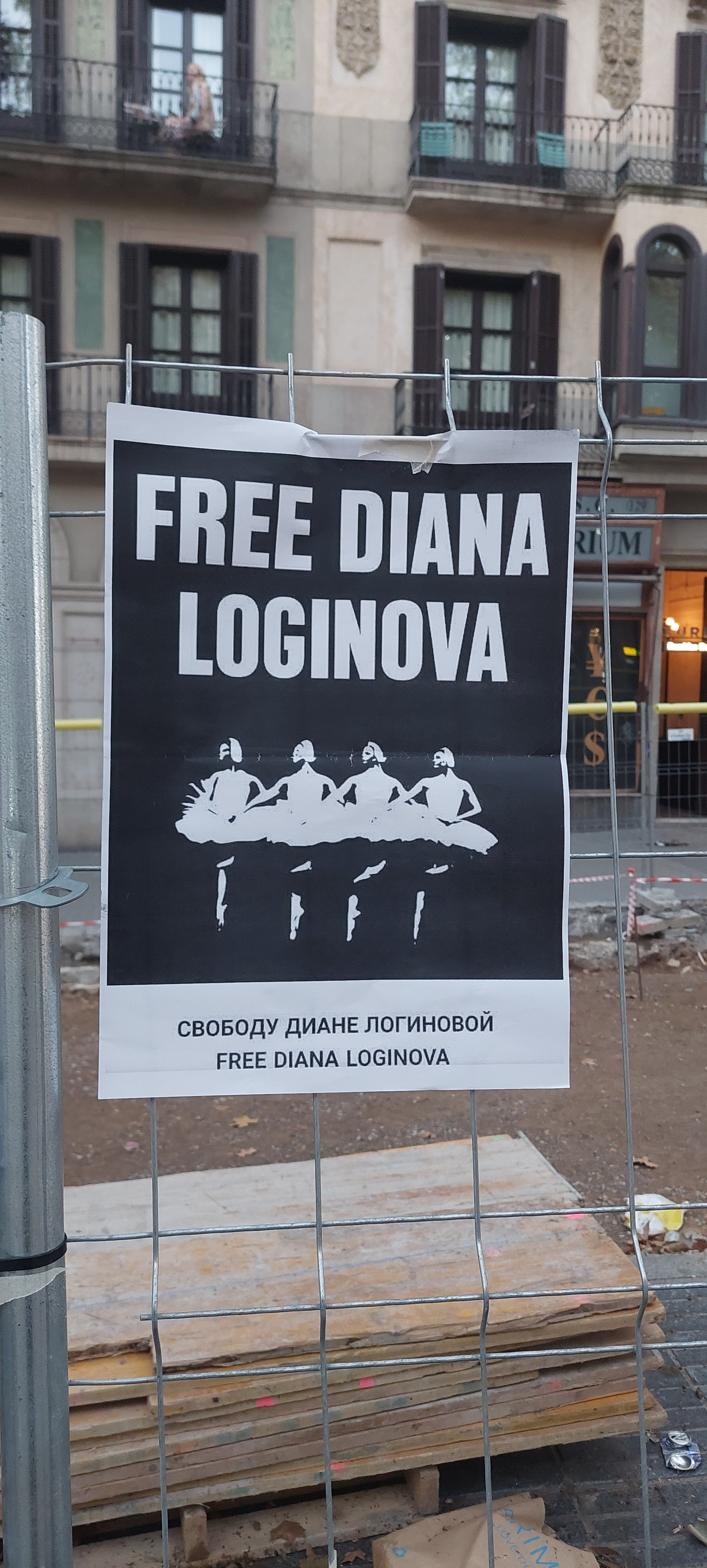
Poster (2025)

In October 2025, a video of the St. Petersburg street band Stoptime performing Noize MC's song Cooperative Swan Lake (see also Ozero), which had been banned by the Primorsky District Court of St. Petersburg, went viral on social media. On 15 October Naoko was detained by police, and the following day, she and the band's percussionist were each jailed for 13 days, while the guitarist was jailed for 12. The charges stemmed from Stoptime's performance near the Ploshchad Vosstaniya metro station on 11 October. The Dzerzhinsky District Court ruled that the band's performance had not been approved by authorities and was obstructing public passage. It also became known that the singer will be charged with a more serious offense under Article 20.3.3 (discrediting the Armed Forces of the Russian Federation) of the Code of the Russian Federation on Administrative Offenses. A denunciation of the musicians was written by State Duma deputy Mikhail Romanov.

That same day, a petition was created on the website Change.org demanding Diana's release.

Music critic Artemy Troitsky, journalist Dmitry Kolezev, pianist Yevgeny Alekseyev, film critics Nikita Nikitin and Ekaterina Barabash, opposition politicians Boris Nadezhdin, Lyubov Sobol, Nikolay Rybakov, Ekaterina Duntsova, and Maxim Reznik, and musicians Monetochka, Noize MC, Mikhail Novitsky, Kasta, Pornofilmy, and Yuri Shevchuk spoke out in support of Diana. In Russia and many other countries, rallies and performances began to take place in support of Loginova and her musical band.

Official and pro-government sources, on the contrary, supported the intervention of law enforcement officers. In turn, independent journalists pointed out that the authorities' response was disproportionately harsh and demonstrated a fear of any manifestations of civil solidarity and anti-war sentiment among young people.

La Trobe University academic Dr. Robert Horvath (is a specialist on Russian Politics) responded to Loginova's arrest this way: "Russian culture in handcuffs. The captive is Diana Loginova ('Naoko'), an 18-year singer whose street performance of Noize MC's anti-Putin song 'Cooperative Swan Lake', with the backing voices of a sizeable crowd in central St. Petersburg, went viral on social media... The bigots who claim that the Putin regime's crimes are a product of Russian culture might reflect, for a moment at least, on her bravery and what it tells us".

Two protocols under the article on public discrediting of the Russian army, which the singer is accused of, were filed with the courts of St. Petersburg on 20 October 2025. Diana's lawyer, Maria Zyryanova, appealed the arrest.

On 28 October, it was reported that Loginova had been arrested again. The day before, guitarist Alexander Orlov was also arrested again. (Note: Allegedly, General Roman Plugin (Russian: Роман Юрьевич Плугин; born 10 March 1975, Stavropol) who has headed the Main Directorate of the Ministry of Internal Affairs for St. Petersburg and the Leningrad Region for 6 years and whose father Yuri Plugin (Russian: Юрий Константинович Плугин; born 1 June 1948, Kazan, Tatar ASSR. USSR) was among Vladimir Putin's authorized representatives in the 2024 Russian presidential election, supported the repression against members of Stoptime (Russian: «Стоптайм»).) At the police station after the trial, Diana became ill due to the stress of recent weeks and needed medical attention.

Leontyev was released on the evening of November 9. Loginova and Orlov were not released from the detention center; on November 10, they were taken to St. Petersburg Police Station No. 2. On November 11, they were remanded in custody for another 13 days. Their appeal was denied.

Loginova and Orlov left Russia on November 23. The musicians were later seen performing in Yerevan. On December 29, Diana Loginova gave an interview to Yuri Dud.
