= Shlisselburgsky =

Shlisselburgsky (masculine), Shlisselburgskaya (feminine), or Shlisselburgskoye (neuter) may refer to:

- Shlisselburgskoye Urban Settlement, a municipal formation corresponding to Shlisselburgskoye Settlement Municipal Formation, an administrative division of Kirovsky District of Leningrad Oblast, Russia
- Shlisselburgsky Uyezd (1755–1923), an administrative division of Saint Petersburg Governorate in the Russian Empire and the early Russian SFSR
