= Yanino-1 =

Settlement east of Saint Petersburg, Russia

Yanino-1 Янино-1
- Urban-type settlement
- Interactive map of Yanino-1
- Location of Yanino-1 Yanino-1 (Leningrad Oblast)
- Coordinates: 59°56′48″N 30°33′24″E
- Country: Russia
- Federal subject: Leningrad Oblast
- Administrative district: Vsevolozhsky District
- Founded: 1853
- Elevation: 16.2 m (53 ft)

Population
  - Estimate (2024): 21,273 )

Municipal status
  - Municipal district: Vsevolozhsky Municipal District
  - Urban settlement: Zanevskoye Urban Settlement
  - Capital of: Zanevskoye Urban Settlement
- Time zone: UTC+3 (MSK)
- Postal code: 188689
- OKTMO ID: 41612155051

Yanino-1 (Russian: Янино-1) is an urban locality (an urban-type settlement) in Vsevolozhsky District of Leningrad Oblast, Russia, located east of Saint Petersburg. In terms of municipal divisions, it (along with other localities) is incorporated as the Zanevskoye Urban Settlement; it is one of the eight urban settlements in the district. As of January 2024, its population was 21,273.

== History ==
Until 2016, Yanino-1 was a village. In the 2010s, intensive high-rise residential construction started, and apartments were sold to individuals who had jobs in nearby Saint Petersburg. In 2015, there was a popular vote to upgrade the village to the urban-type settlement, and after the success of the vote, in February 2016 Yanino-1 was granted the urban-type settlement status. Simultaneously, Zanevskoye Rural Settlement changed its status and became Zanevskoye Urban Settlement.

== Administrative and municipal status ==
Within the framework of administrative divisions, it is incorporated, together with the town of Kudrovo and a number of rural localities, within Vsevolozhsky District as Zanevskoye Settlement Municipal Formation. Yanino-1 is the administrative center of this municipal formation. As a municipal division, Zanevskoye Settlement Municipal Formation is incorporated within Vsevolozhsky Municipal District as Zanevskoye Urban Settlement.

== Economy ==
=== Transportation ===
Ladozhskaya station, a metro station of the Saint Petersburg Metro, is located in a couple of kilometers west of Yanino-1. Buses connect the settlement with this station.

The railway line connecting the Ladozhsky railway station in Saint-Petersburg and Mga runs close to Yanino-1; 5 km platform is in a less than a kilometer from Yanino-1.
