= Kokkorevo =

Kokkorevo Коккорево
- Interactive map of Kokkorevo
- Location of Kokkorevo Kokkorevo (Leningrad Oblast)
- Coordinates: 60°4′54″N 31°3′54″E
- Country: Russia
- Federal subject: Leningrad Oblast

Population
  - Estimate (2017): 210 )
- Time zone: UTC+3 (MSK)
- Postal code: 188672
- OKTMO ID: 41612167131

Kokkorevo (Russian: Коккорево; Finnish: Kokkero) is a village in the Vsevolozhsky District of the Leningrad Oblast, Russia. It is situated on the western shore of Lake Ladoga, and played a role in establishing supply lines during the Siege of Leningrad. The Broken Ring monument (ru:Разорванное кольцо), part of the larger Green Belt of Glory complex, is located in the village.
