= Kudrovo =

Town in Leningrad Oblast, Russia

Kudrovo Кудрово
- Town
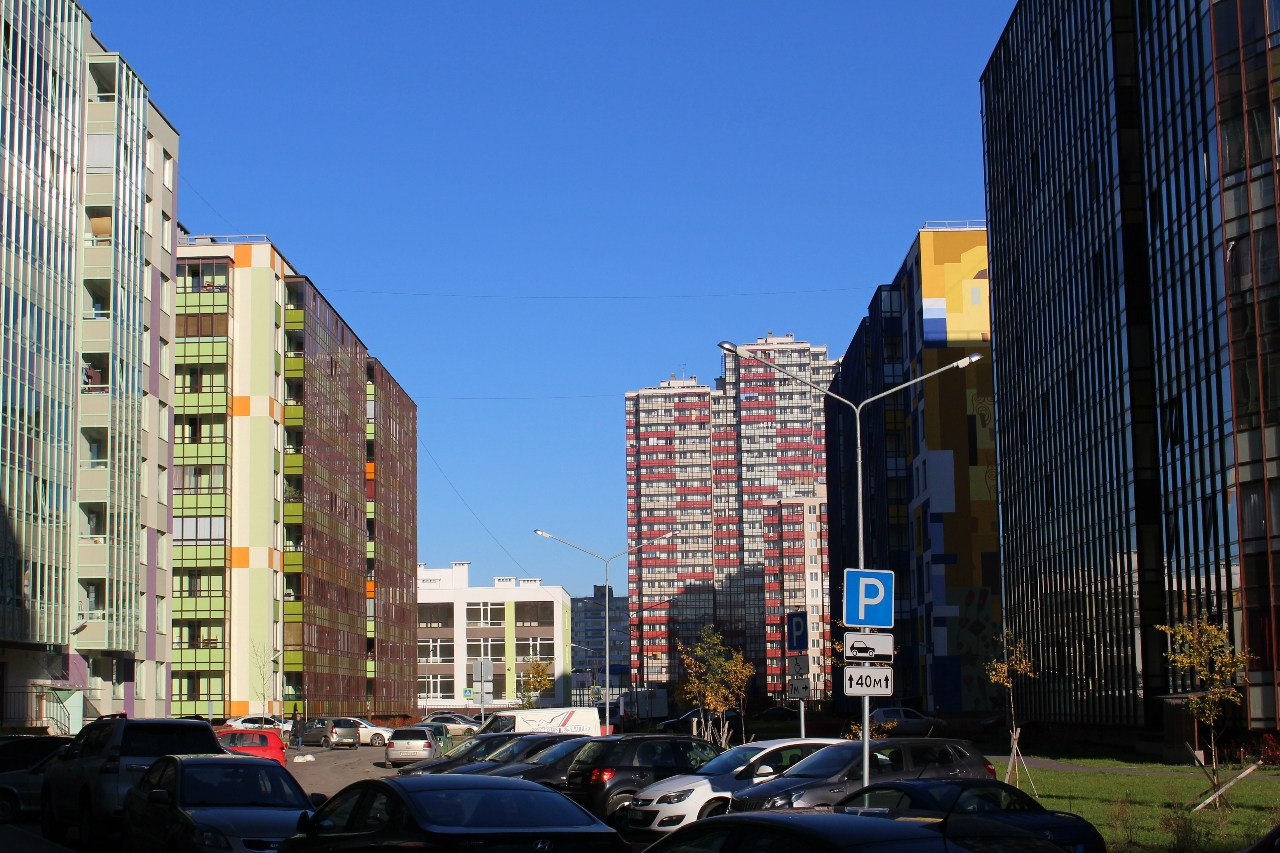
- Interactive map of Kudrovo
- Location of Kudrovo Kudrovo (Leningrad Oblast)
- Coordinates: 59°54′N 30°31′E
- Country: Russia
- Federal subject: Leningrad Oblast
- Administrative district: Vsevolozhsky District
- Settlement municipal formationSelsoviet: Zanevskoye Settlement Municipal Formation
- Founded: 1885
- Town status since: 2018

Population
  - Estimate (2021): 60,791 )

Municipal status
  - Municipal district: Vsevolozhsky Municipal District
  - Urban settlement: Zanevskoye Urban Settlement
- Time zone: UTC+3 (MSK)
- Postal codes: 188692, 188689, 188693
- OKTMO ID: 41612155005

Kudrovo (Russian: Ку́дрово) is a town in Vsevolozhsky District of Leningrad Oblast, Russia, located east of and immediately adjacent to the city of St. Petersburg. Formerly a village, it was granted town status on 29 June 2018. As of the 2021 census, Kudrovo was home to 60,791 inhabitants.

== History ==
In 2010, the population of the village was just over 100. Subsequently, intensive high-rise residential construction started, and apartments were sold to individuals who had jobs in nearby Saint Petersburg. The infrastructure lagged considerably behind this development. There is no industry or large-scale infrastructure in Kudrovo.

The world's most crowded apartment block can also be found in Kudrovo. The complex is home to around 20,000 people and contains 3,708 apartments. The building has 35 entrances and 25 floors. There is an average of 4 to 6 apartments on each floor. The giant apartment complex was built in 2015.

== Administrative and municipal status ==
Within the framework of administrative divisions, it is incorporated, together with the urban-type settlement of Yanino-1 and a number of rural localities, within Vsevolozhsky District as Zanevskoye Settlement Municipal Formation. As a municipal division, Zanevskoye Settlement Municipal Formation is incorporated within Vsevolozhsky Municipal District as Zanevskoye Urban Settlement.

== Economy ==
=== Transportation ===
Ulitsa Dybenko station, a metro station of the Saint Petersburg Metro, is located less than a kilometer from the western boundary of Kudrovo. Buses connect Kudrovo with this station. Kudrovo is separated from Saint Petersburg by a railway line, which does not have passenger traffic.
