= Toksovo =

Toksovo Токсово
- Urban-type settlement
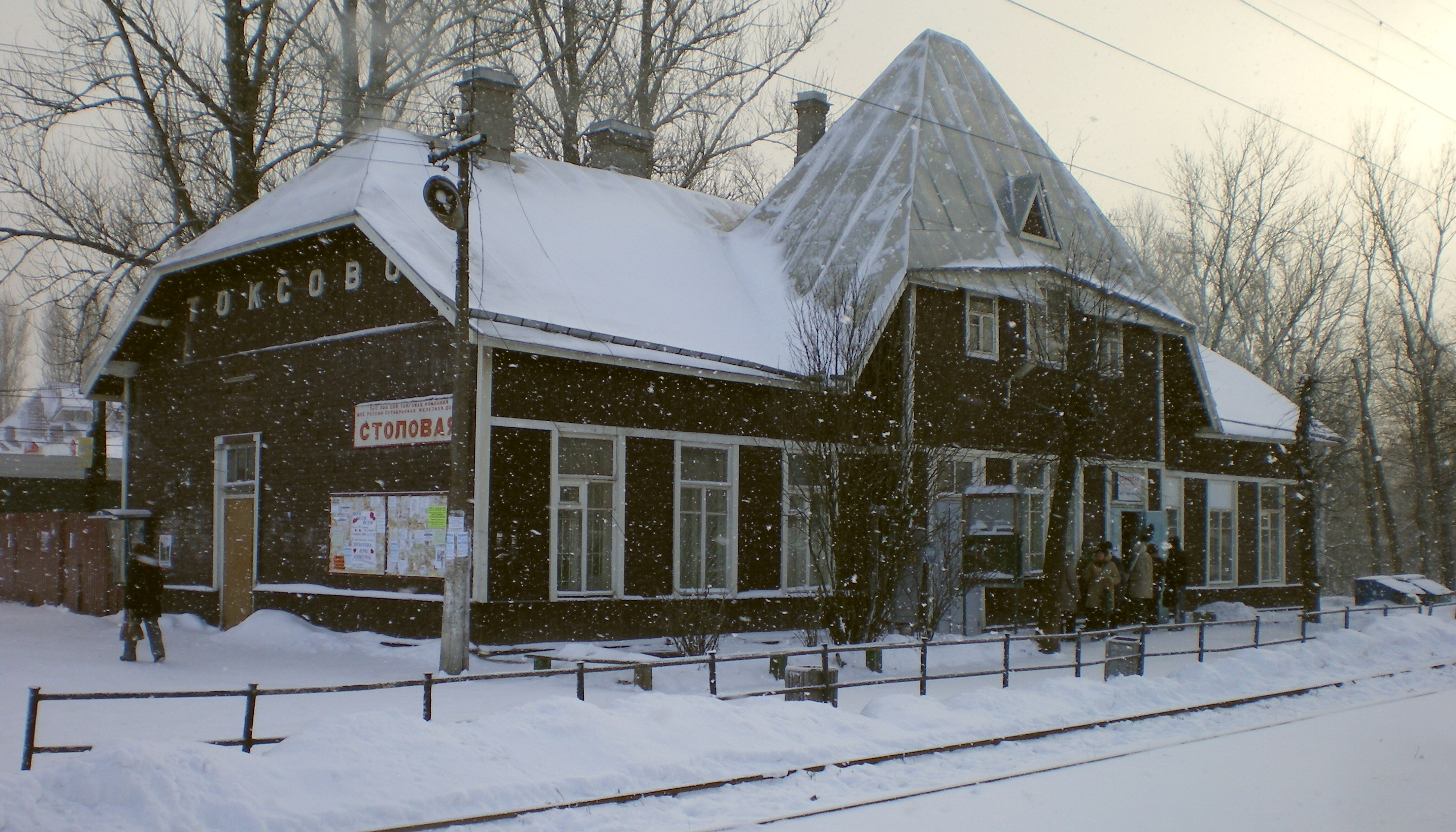
- Toksovo railway station

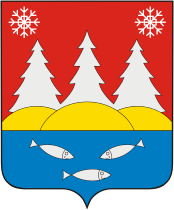
- Coat of arms
- Interactive map of Toksovo
- Location of Toksovo Toksovo (Leningrad Oblast)
- Coordinates: 60°09′20″N 30°31′30″E
- Country: Russia
- Federal subject: Leningrad Oblast
- Administrative district: Vsevolozhsky District
- Urban-type settlement status since: 1963

Population (2010 Census)
  - Total: 6,127
  - Estimate (2024): 6,806 (+11.1%)

Municipal status
  - Municipal district: Vsevolozhsky Municipal District
  - Urban settlement: Toksovskoye Urban Settlement
  - Capital of: Toksovskoye Urban Settlement
- Time zone: UTC+3 (MSK)
- Postal code: 188664
- OKTMO ID: 41612175051
- Website: toksovo-lo.ru

Toksovo (Russian: То́ксово; Finnish: Toksova) is an urban locality (an urban-type settlement) in Vsevolozhsky District of Leningrad Oblast, Russia, located 20 kilometers (12 mi) to the north of St. Petersburg on the Karelian Isthmus. It is served by two neighboring stations of the Saint Petersburg-Khiytola railroad: Toksovo (constructed in 1917) and Kavgolovo (1929) (which serves a popular ski resort). Population: 6,127 (2010 census); 5,893 (2002 census); 5,699 (1989 Soviet census).

== History ==
Toksovo was first mentioned in chronicles in 1500. At the time, it belonged to Vodskaya Pyatina, one of the five pyatinas Novgorod Lands were subdivided into. In 1583, after the Livonian War, it became Swedish. In 1708, in the Great Northern War, it was conquered by Russia. In the same year, it was included into Saint Petersburg Governorate, and later on became a part of Shlisselburgsky Uyezd. In 1914, the governorate was renamed Petrograd Governorate.

In the 19th century, the region became a ski resort and a dacha place, known as the "Finnish Switzerland" or "Saint Petersburg Switzerland."

After the October Revolution, North Ingria, including Toksovo, seceded from Bolshevist Russia, but was reincorporated with the Treaty of Tartu at the end of 1920. On February 14, 1923 Shlisselburgsky Uyezd was merged into Petrogradsky Uyezd. In January, 1924 the uyezd and the governorate were renamed Leningradsky/Leningrad.

On August 1, 1927, the uyezds were abolished and Kuyvozovsky District, with the administrative center in the village of Kuyvozy, was established. The district was inhabited by Ingrian Finns, with Finnish being the official language (since 1931). On October 30, 1930, the district center was transferred to Toksovo, which at the time being had a status of suburban settlement. On March 20, 1936 Kuyvozovsky District was renamed Toksovsky. On February 22, 1939 Toksovsky District was abolished and merged into Pargolovsky District. On April 3, 1954 Pargolovsky District was abolished, and Toksovo was transferred to Vsevolozhsky District. On May 13, 1963 Toksovo was granted urban-type settlement status.

In 1937, a large ski ramp was built in Toksovo, and in the late 1950s another one, which at the time was the largest ski jump of Europe and the fourth largest of the world. Today the largest hill is out of order, but smaller ones are operating and have plastic mattings.

In 1937–1939, during the Great Purge, the Rzhevsky artillery range, a large area to the southeast of Toksovo, was the main NKVD place of execution near Leningrad.

In 1942, during the Siege of Leningrad all Finns and Izhorians were deported from the townlet and the region. During the Siege of Leningrad an important radar station was operated near the townlet. In 1953, after Joseph Stalin's death, Finns and Izhorians were allowed to return. In 1974, a European bison farm was started here. In 2000, Toksovan Sanomat, a Finnish Language newspaper, began publication. In 2002, at Koirankangas near Toksovo the Memorial society found a secret grave with remains of 30,000 people executed by the NKVD, among whom are most probably the philosopher Pavel Florensky and other prominent people. In 2003, a stage of the FIS Cross-country skiing World Cup was held in the townlet. Currently it is a ski and tourist resort and a dacha place, famous for its forests and lakes.

== Economy ==
=== Transportation ===
Toksovo is located on the railroad connecting Saint Petersburg with Sortavala via Priozersk. The two railway stations in the settlement, Toksovo railway station and Kavgolovo railway platform, are connected by suburban service with the Finland Station.

Toksovo is essentially a suburb of Saint Petersburg, and is included in the dense suburban road network.

=== Tourism ===
The north part of Toksovo (unofficially called Kavgolovo like the nearby railway platform) is a center of a recreational area, which includes sports facilities like ski jumps and ski slopes, and attracts holiday visitors from Saint Petersburg. National and international competitions are held on a regular basis.

== Culture and recreation ==
Toksovo contains seven objects classified as cultural and historical heritage of local significance. Six of them commemorate events of the World War II, in particular, the Siege of Leningrad, and the seventh one is the summer house where in 1927 Aleksey Nikolayevich Tolstoy, a Russian author, stayed.
