= Novoye Devyatkino =

Novoye Devyatkino Новое Девяткино
- Village
- Location within Leningrad Oblast Location within Russia
- Coordinates: 60°03′25″N 30°28′45″E
- Country: Russia
- Region: Leningrad Oblast
- District: Vsevolozhsky District

Population (2010)
  - Total: 10,978
- Time zone: UTC+3:00

Novoye Devyatkino (Russian: Новое Девяткино) is a village in Vsevolozhsky District of Leningrad Oblast, Russia. Population: 10,978 (2010 census); 8,847 (2002 census); .
