= Kuzmolovsky =

Kuzmolovsky Кузьмоловский
- Urban-type settlement
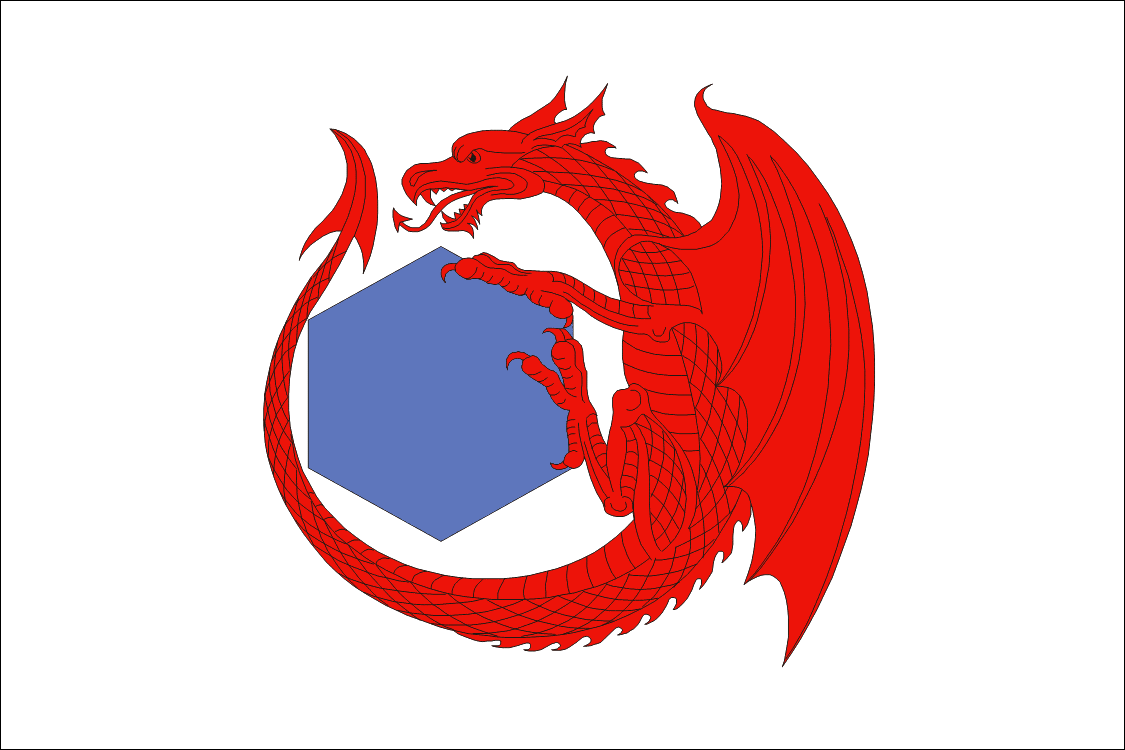
- Flag
- Interactive map of Kuzmolovsky
- Location of Kuzmolovsky Kuzmolovsky (Leningrad Oblast)
- Coordinates: 60°06′37″N 30°29′32″E
- Country: Russia
- Federal subject: Leningrad Oblast
- Administrative district: Vsevolozhsky District
- Urban-type settlement status since: 1961

Population (2010 Census)
  - Total: 9,689
  - Estimate (2024): 12,786 (+32%)

Municipal status
  - Municipal district: Vsevolozhsky Municipal District
  - Urban settlement: Kuzmolovskoye Urban Settlement
  - Capital of: Kuzmolovskoye Urban Settlement
- Time zone: UTC+3 (MSK)
- Postal code: 188663
- OKTMO ID: 41612158051
- Website: kuzmolovskoegp.ru

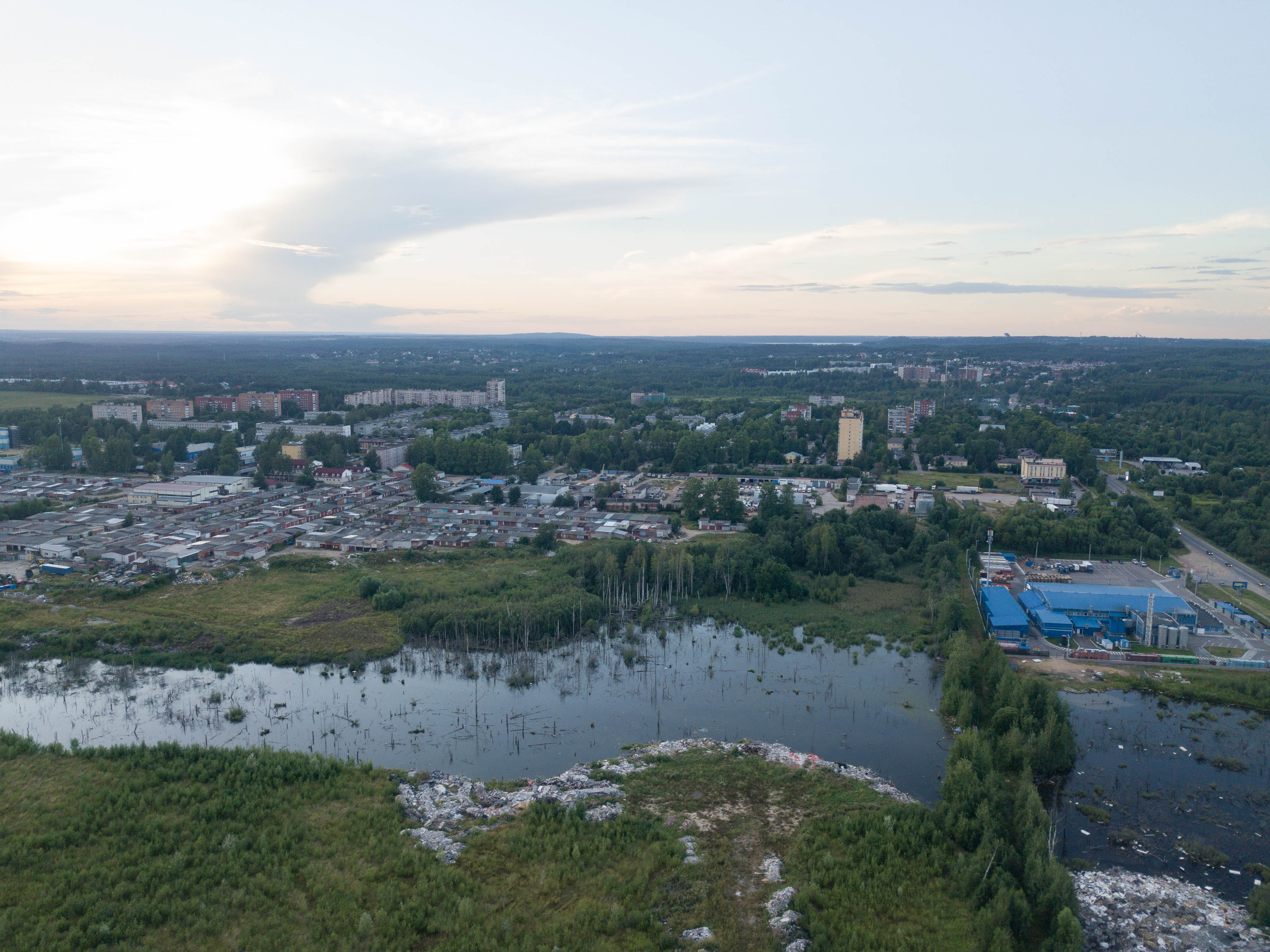
Kuzmolovsky aerial view

Kuzmolovsky (Russian: Ку́зьмоловский) is an urban locality (an urban-type settlement) in Vsevolozhsky District of Leningrad Oblast, Russia, located north of the city of Saint Petersburg. Municipally it is incorporated as Kuzmolovskoye Urban Settlement, one of the eight urban settlements in the district. Population: 9,689 (2010 census); 9,725 (2002 census); 10,435 (1989 Soviet census).

== History ==
The village of Kuzmolovo was founded in the 19th century. After 1939, it belonged to Pargolovsky District of Leningrad Oblast. On April 3, 1954 Pargolovsky District was abolished, and Kuzmolovo was transferred to Vsevolozhsky District. Intensive construction started in 1953, when the chemical plant was built, and housing was needed for the workers. On April 21, 1961 Kuzmolovo was granted urban-type settlement status and renamed Kuzmolovsky.

== Economy ==
The economy of the settlement is based on chemical industry.

=== Transportation ===
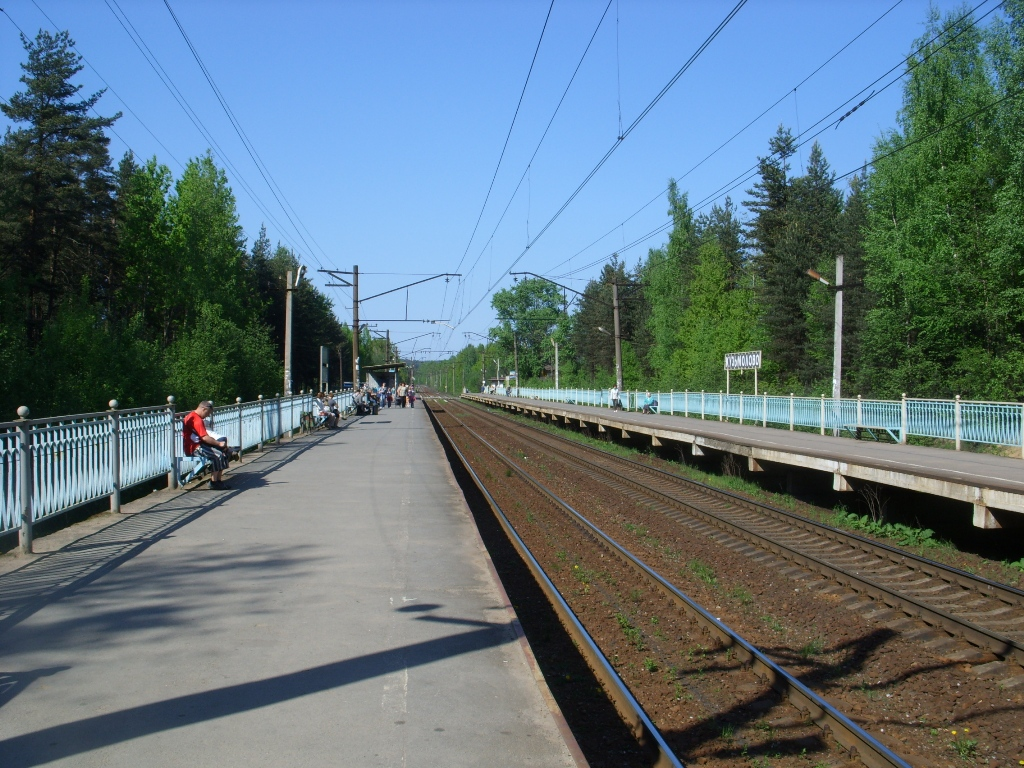
Kuzmolovo railway platform

Kuzmolovsky is located on the railroad connecting Saint Petersburg with Sortavala via Priozersk and is served by Kuzmolovo railway platform. There is suburban service from the Finland Station of Saint Petersburg.

Kuzmolovsky is essentially a suburb of Saint Petersburg, and is included in the dense suburban road network.
