= Green Belt of Glory =

Set of memorial facilities at the forefront of the battle for Leningrad

The Green Belt of Glory is a war memorial surrounding Saint Petersburg, Russia, commemorating the Siege of Leningrad of the Second World War. The belt consists of multiple small memorials marking the historical front line.

== History ==
The concept originated from poet Mikhail Dudin, and was approved by the Leningrad and Regional Councils. Lead-up work took place from 1958 to 1964. Construction began in 1965 on the eve of the 20th victory celebrations. Work on an initial 26 memorials marking the front line as in September 1941 was completed in 1968. The memorials were constructed by contractors, teachers and students, and soldiers.

== Layout ==
The Green Belt of Glory is divided into the "Greater" and "Lesser" rings. The Greater ring has two lines, one to the north of the city and one to the south. The Lesser ring is separate from the Greater ring and marks the land front of the pocket that formed south of Kotlin Island whose back was to the Gulf of Finland. Together they mark the front lines.

There are over 80 memorials and monuments situated along the rings. The symbolic heart of the belt is in the Monument to the Heroic Defenders of Leningrad in Victory Square. Some of the sites are in poor condition.

The belt remains a gathering point for ceremonies commemorating the war and the siege.
