= Road of Life =

Ice road used during World War II

Coordinates: 59°56′N 30°20′E

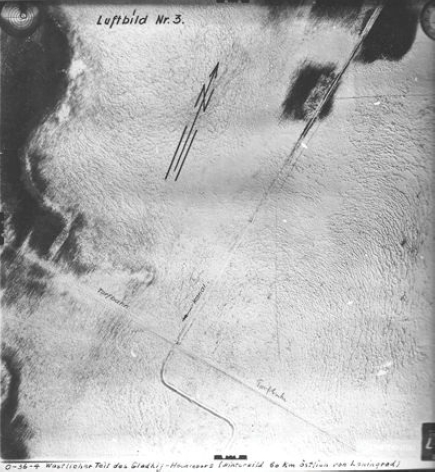
Luftwaffe aerial reconnaissance photo of a section of the Ice Road, 60 km (37 mi) east of Leningrad

The Road of Life (Russian: Доро́га жи́зни, romanized: doroga zhizni) was the set of ice road transport routes across Lake Ladoga to Leningrad during the Second World War. They were the only Soviet winter surface routes into the city while it was besieged by German Army Group North under Feldmarschall Wilhelm Ritter von Leeb.

The routes operated in the winters of 1941–1942 and 1942–1943. Construction and operation were performed under German artillery and aerial bombardment. In January 1943 the Soviet's Operation Iskra broke the encirclement, and the ice roads were used in conjunction with land routes for the remainder of the winter.

The routes carried supplies necessary to sustain life and resistance inside the Leningrad pocket, and evacuated non-combatants, wounded, and industrial equipment. Over 1.3 million people, primarily women and children, were evacuated over the roads during the siege.

The Road of Life is now a World Heritage Site.

== History ==
=== The blockade forms ===
On 8 September 1941, Army Group North captured Shlisselburg on the shores of Lake Ladoga, east of Leningrad, and took control of all land routes to Leningrad. This followed the capture of Mga, south of Shlisselburg, on 29 August which cut the city off from the Soviet railway network. The Soviets fell back onto transport by ship over Lake Ladoga and by air; the evacuation of strategic industries and personnel, and shipments of munitions from Leningrad, continued.

On 16 October, the Germans launched an offensive toward Tikhvin and the last Soviet railroad from Moscow to Lake Ladoga that ran through it. The Soviet Leningrad Front under General Ivan Fedyuninsky launched its own offensive toward Sinyavino on 20 October to recapture the Shlisselburg corridor and break the encirclement. The offensive achieved little, and was cancelled on 28 October due to the severity of the German attack. On 8 November, the Germans captured Tikhvin and reached the outskirts of Volkhov. The railroad cut was temporary; the exhausted Germans could not hold the salient in worsening weather and against increasing Soviet pressure. The slow Soviet counteroffensive began on 12 November, and by the end of December the Germans were pushed back to much where they had been before their Tikhvin offensive.

=== Winter 1941–1942 ===
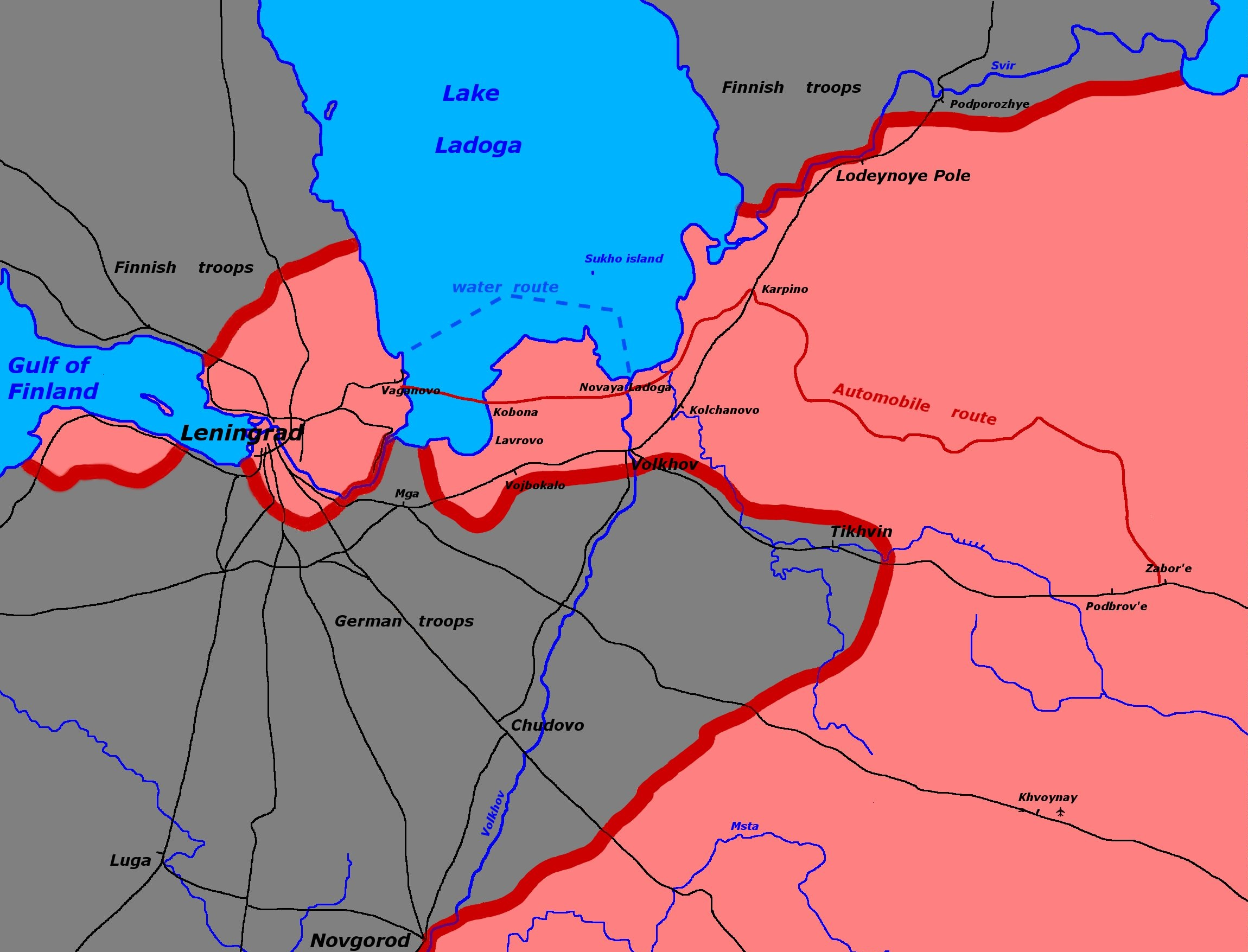
Road of life in November–December 1941

Road of life in November–December 1941

Weight of supplies moved in the winter of 1941–1942
Month	Mass (tonnes)	
Month	Food	All including food
November 1941	1,500 (mostly flour)	
January 1942	42,000	52,000
February 1942	67,000	86,000
March 1942	87,000	113,000
April 1942	57,000	87,000

In late October 1941, with the failure of Leningrad Front's Sinyavino offensive, and the developing German Tikhvin offensive, Soviet Stavka became pessimistic about breaking the Leningrad encirclement and deeply concerned about the possibility of the city's isolation. With the Leningrad Front unable to lift the blockade, Stavka ordered the construction of a supply route over Lake Ladoga before the lake had frozen. On 19 November, the Leningrad Front ordered the construction of the 101st BAD (voenno-avtomobil'naia doroga, or military vehicular road) ice road across the lake from Kobona to Vaganova via Shlisselburg Bay, spanning 27 to 32 km (17 to 20 mi). A second longer road, the 102nd BAD, was constructed to bypass German-occupied Tikhvin from the north. A 27 km (17 mi) road from Kokkorevo to Vaganova via Kloch'ia Island was built between 18 and 28 November, followed by more roads to the north as the ice thickened. Expansion of the ice roads and their capacity continued until the spring thaw in April 1942.

The first supplies were transported over the road on 19 November 1941 by a transport regiment under Captain Mikhail Murov using horse-drawn sleigh. The first trucks – a column of 60 under Major V. A. Porchunov – arrived on the western shore on the night of 22 November. The Soviets struggled with truck availability and losses. On the ice, trucks became stuck in snowdrifts, abandoned after their drivers became lost, or sank due to poor ice conditions exacerbated by enemy fire. The poor feeder forest roads from Zaborye – the closest railhead before the recapture of Tikhvin – exacted their own toll in abandoned and unserviceable vehicles. According to Salisbury, at one point 1300 or 3500 trucks were out of service, and 1004 were lost overall.

On the day of the first truck convoy, Leningrad officials asked the State Defense Committee (GKO) to support the road. Joseph Stalin tentatively approved, but he failed to appreciate the importance and only limited resources were committed. The Leningrad Front planned the ice roads to bring 1965 tonnes of supplies to the city per day, but this was not initially met. Little was achieved in the first weeks of operation. The number of vehicles that could be assembled from Leningrad was limited. A severe winter in late November, as well as a surprise thaw starting on 30 November reduced traffic. The supply organization was poor leading Andrey Khrulyov, head of the Rear of the Red Army, to order Andrei Zhdanov, the Leningrad Communist Party secretary, to make the ice road more efficient on 7 December; performance slowly improved after Zhdanov and Alexey Kuznetsov took charge of the supply effort. Soviet strategy also interfered. The Soviets hoped that the recapture of Tikhvin on 8 December and the reopening of the railroad would permit the Red Army to break the encirclement in the short-term; this may have led to traffic on the road stopping on 8 December and operations being formally suspended on 12 December.

Traffic resumed by late December. By this time, the railhead was at Voibokalo near Shlisselburg Bay. By the end of December the ice was 1 metre (3 ft) thick and covered by 30 centimetres (12 in) of snow, able to support unlimited use and heavy vehicles. On 23 December, the delivered amount – 786 tonnes – exceeded the city's daily consumption rate for the first time. State support began arriving in January 1942. The GKO sent Alexei Kosygin to Leningrad to improve road operations on 19 January. Kosygin requested support to evacuate 500,000 civilians on 21 January. The request was approved by Stalin the next day and led to much greater support for the road. Throughput was increased by running more convoys per road per day, which placed great pressure on drivers. As a result, throughput finally reached the Front's target on 18 January 1942, and continued to increase in the second half of the January. Further improvements came from extending the railroad from Voibokalo to the edge of the lake at Kobona and Kosa. The GKO ordered the extensions on 11 January and they entered service on 20 February and 6 March respectively. In the final three weeks, the roads delivered 4.5 times more supplies than they had in November and December 1941.

Shipments of food permitted a series of ration increases from late December, and by February 1942 civilians in the Leningrad pocket received rations comparable to those elsewhere in the Soviet Union. When the ice roads melted, reserves – rebuilt from mid-January – were sufficient to last until ship traffic on the lake resumed.

Other supplies in the spring of 1942 partially revived factory production and city transport; fuel had run out in January.

Personnel and goods were evacuated from the pocket over the roads. Industrial evacuation was prioritized when the roads opened on Stalin's orders. Leningrad was left to evacuate civilians as best it could; only 36,118 evacuees, plus an unknown number who bribed truck drivers or illegally made the trip on foot, crossed the lake out of the pocket between 6 December and 22 January. Large scale civilian evacuation – mainly of those unable to work, such as women, children and the infirm – only began in late January 1942 with the large allocation of resources and vehicles by the GKO; 554,186 civilians were evacuated from 22 January to 15 April. 35,000 wounded soldiers were also evacuated. Industrial equipment from 86 plants and factories and some art and museum collections were evacuated starting in December 1941, and 20% of the 3,677 railroad cars were transferred over the ice roads.

Traffic was progressively curtailed starting in March with the onset of the spring thaw. That month the Germans intensified their air attacks on the ice road, including round-the-clock attacks on some days. The ice roads were declared out of service on 21 April. A final shipment of 64 tonnes of spring onions was made on 23–24 April, and vehicular traffic ended the next day. In total, 356,000 tons of supplies were transported, including 271,000 tons of food, 32,000 tons of military supplies, and 37,000 tons of fuel.

=== Energy infrastructure ===
On 2 April 1942, a meeting at the Kremlin with the Anastas Mikoyan approved construction plans for an underwater fuel pipeline through Lake Ladoga to Leningrad. Piping was sourced from the Izhorsk factory in the city. The State Defense Committee ordered the Red Army to construct the pipeline on 25 April, and it entered service on 18 June. The pipeline was 35 km (22 mi) long and 12 m (39 ft) deep, and delivered 295 tonnes of fuel per day.

The city began receiving electricity from the power plant at Volkhov through an underwater cable in September 1942.

=== Winter 1942–1943 ===
The Soviets built new ice roads for the winter of 1942–1943. The winter of 1942–1943 was milder than the last; the roads were serviceable for a shorter time as the lake froze later and thawed sooner. The road opened on 19 December and the first convoy crossed the next day. Longer truck columns were used to compensate for the limited load per truck. Thaws closed the road from 9 to 12 January, and finally on 30 March. The roads were serviceable for 101 days between 20 December and 30 March, of which only 97 were suitable for mass truck movement. Trucks moved 210,000 tonnes of supplies, mainly food and ammunition, and over 200,000 personnel and evacuees moved over the roads.

The Soviets also started construction of a railroad over the ice. 15 km (9 mi) of track on the western edge of the lake was complete by mid-January.

The Soviets launched Operation Iskra in January 1943 and retook the Shlisselburg corridor. Construction of the lake railroad was abandoned. A railroad from Shlisselburg to Poliana through the recaptured land route began construction on 21 January and opened on 6 February; it became the main supply route to the city. The ice roads remained operational for the remainder of the winter as reliable alternatives to the railroad. Retaking the Shlisselburg corridor prevented the German artillery from bombarding the ice road, although ineffective air attacks continued. The new railroad drew heavy German artillery fire and required frequent repairs.

== Construction and maintenance ==
Measuring 219 km (136 mi) in length and 138 km (86 mi) wide, Lake Ladoga (or Lake Nevo as it was called in ancient times) is Europe's largest lake. Due to its size and unpredictable weather conditions, many speculated that the construction of an ice road connecting its shores would be impossible.

Although the Russians had previous historical experience in ice road construction (an ice railroad had been laid over the Kola River near Murmansk during World War I, and another over a portion of Lake Baikal during the construction of the Trans-Siberian Railway), none of their prior endeavors were as complicated or as urgent as the Ladoga supply route. Even during winter, the region's erratic winds were capable of increasing or decreasing the lake's water level by as much as four feet (1.2 m) within just a few hours. A team of engineers was quickly assembled to ensure that the proposed 48 km (30 mi) route would be structurally sound. One Leningrad scientist noted:

"At −5 °C (23 °F), 4 inches (10 cm) of ice would form in 64 hours; at −10 °C (14 °F), 4 inches would form in 34 hours, at −15 °C (5 °F), 4 inches in 23 hours. A foot of ice (30 cm) would be laid down in 24 days at 23 °F (−5 °C). It would take 8 days to create a foot of ice at 5 °F (−15 °C)."

Additionally:

- A minimum of 10 cm (4 in) of ice was necessary to support a horse without cargo.
- A minimum of 18 cm (7 in) of ice was necessary to support a horse-drawn sleigh with one ton of cargo.
- A minimum of 20 cm (8 in) of ice was necessary to support a truck transporting one ton of cargo.

Although only 30 cm (1 ft) of ice was required to support mass transit along the route, the actual thickness of the ice typically ranged from 90–150 cm (3–5 ft), a density thick enough for nearly any task.

Construction was carried out in the face of inclement weather, changing and hazardous ice conditions, and German artillery and aerial bombardment which required camouflage and anti-aircraft defences. Roads were configured for around-the-clock, two-way, all-weather operation.

Once the route had been confirmed and tested for stability, larger plows and snow carving machines were then used to widen the ice road and make it more suitable for automobile transport. Of the 1,770 km (1,100 mi) of roads built during the winter of 1941–1942, 1,650 km (1,030 mi) required repeated snow removal. By February 1942, large snow banks on either side of the route had been made into massive ice walls, which shielded transport from the lake's harsh winds. As the ice melted in the spring, the ice road melted, and was replaced with a flotilla system that continued to ferry goods across the massive lake.

As soon as the ice hardened, the Road of Life was reconstructed again in December 1942. Since February 1943 the road became superseded by the land corridor, but ice traffic continued until March 30.

== Operation ==
US propaganda film showing the Road of Life.

When the roads opened for the winter of 1941–1942, Leningrad Front deployed an elaborate organization onto the ice to manage and support traffic, which included road guides, communications points, road service commandant posts, medical and rescue service points, feeding points, and combat security posts.

Leningrad Front's Road-Commandant Service maintained traffic control posts along the ice roads. Traffic regulators controlled vehicle movement, monitored ice conditions, marked the routes with blackout lanterns, and warned drivers of obstructions or accidents ahead; regulators contributed significantly to the roads' success. Initially, there were 20 posts at 300 to 400 metres (1,000 to 1,300 ft) intervals. By 1 January 1942, there were 75 posts, 350 traffic regulators, and 150–300 blackout lanterns. Later, settling weather and high snow walls flanking the roads made control easier, allowing the interval between posts to increase to 1 to 2 km (0.6 to 1.2 mi).

Soviet forces defended the ice roads, connecting land routes, and other road-related infrastructure.

== After the siege ==
In the summer, with the start of the navigable period, deliveries to the city continued thanks to the Ladoga Military Flotilla. In 1943 the Road of Life was replaced by the Road of Victory – a railway, laid on the narrow path conquered during operation Iskra from Leningrad to Volkhov. Now the Road of Life, within the limits of Saint Petersburg, is often referred to as Ryabovskoe Highway, but within Vsevolozhsk, the Road of Life is the official name.

== Monuments and memorials ==
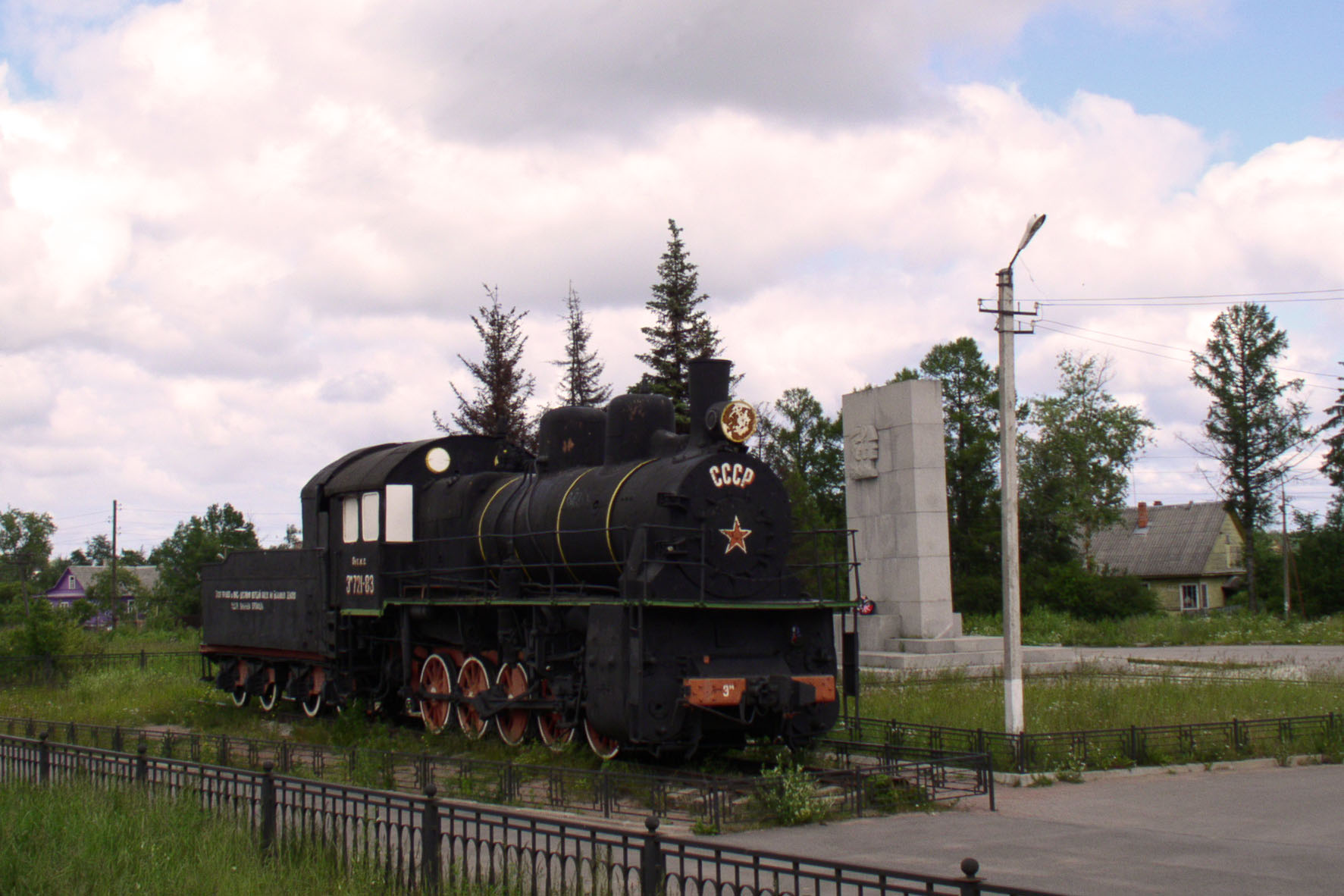
The steam locomotive at Petrokrepost railway station established in memory of a railwayman of the Road of Life

The Road of Life is commemorated by seven monuments and 46 memorial poles along the road, and 56 memorial poles along the railway; all are part of the Green Belt of Glory (Зелёный пояс славы).

- The memorial complex "The Flower of Life" ("Цветок жизни"), at the 3rd km of the Road of Life, consists of a monument, erected in 1968, by the architects A. D. Levyenkov and P. I. Melnikov, and eight tablets (representing pages from the diary of the Leningrad schoolgirl Tanya Savicheva), erected in 1975 by the architects A. D. Levyenkov and G. G. Fetisov, and the engineer M. V. Koman.
- The "Rumbolovsk Hill" ("Румболовская гора") memorial complex, at the 10th km, in Vsevolozhsk, erected by the architects P. F. Kozlov and V. N. Polukhin. It consists of metallic oak and laurel leaves, symbolising life and glory, and a tablet with a verse by the poet Olga Berggolts.
- The "Katyusha" ("Катюша") monument, at the 17th km, near the village of Kornevo, erected in 1966 by the architects A. D. Levyenkov, P. I. Melnikov, L. V. Chulkevich and the designers G. I. Ivanov and L. V. Izyurov.
- Fifty-six memorial kilometre posts along the Finland Station – Lake Ladoga railway line. Erected 1970 by the architects M. N. Meisel' and I. G. Yavein.
- Forty-six memorial kilometre posts on the highway from Rzhevka railway station, on the edge of Saint Petersburg, to Lake Ladoga. Erected in 1967 by the architect M. N. Meisel'.
- A memorial consisting of a steam locomotive, which had operated on the Road of Life, erected at the station Lake Ladoga in 1974 by the architect V. I. Kuznetsov.

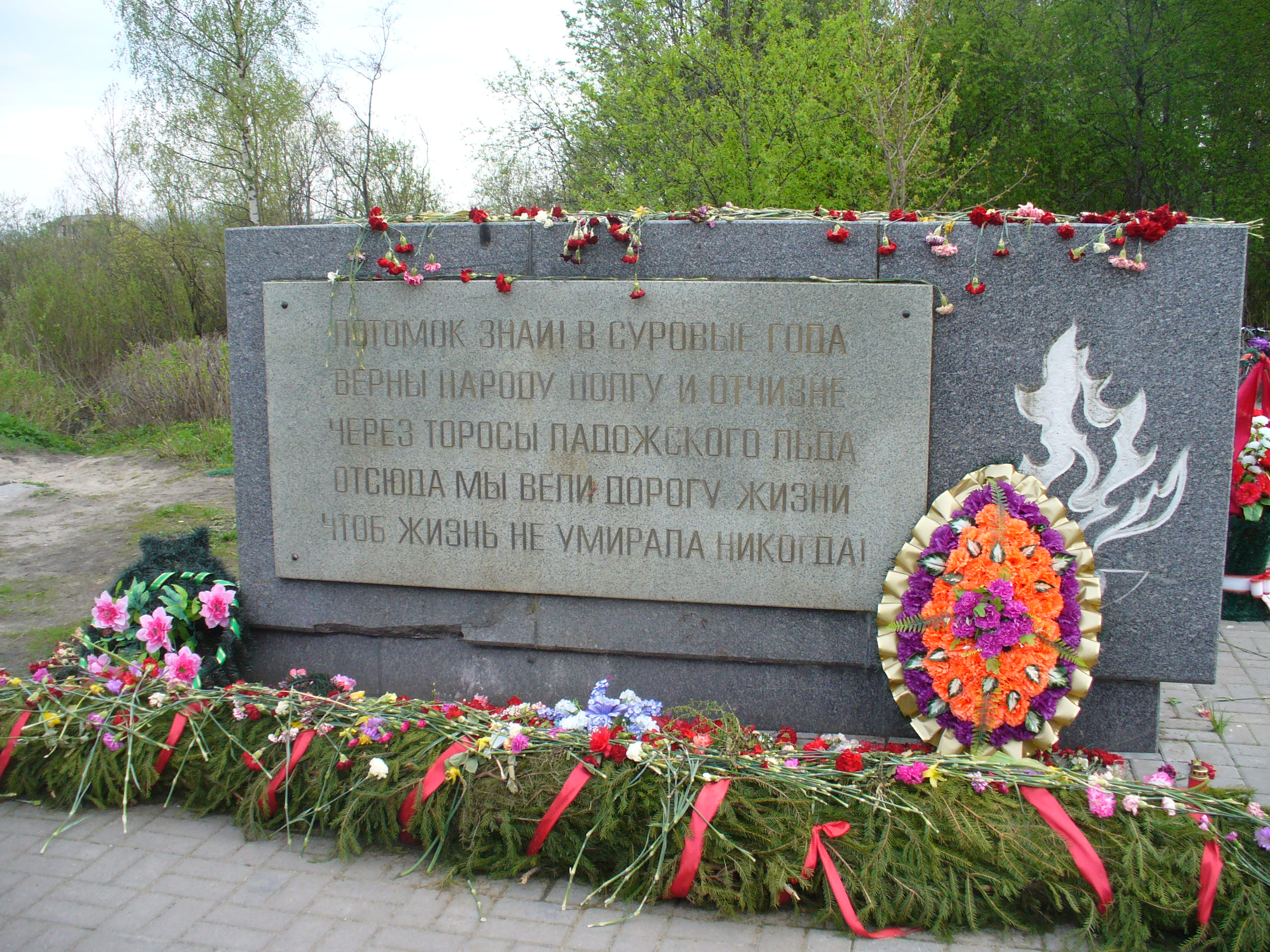
Memorial element The "Broken Circle", 1966,

- The memorial complex "Broken Circle), at the 40th km of the Road of Life, on the shore of Lake Ladoga near the village of Kokkorevo. Consists of a statue of an anti-aircraft cannon (1966, sculptor Konstantin Simun, architect V. G. Fillipov, engineer I. A. Rybin).
- "The Crossing" ("Переправа") monument, near the hamlet of Morozova, dedicated to the memory of the soldier-pontooneers (1970, architect L. M. Drexler, engineer E. N. Lutsko).
- The "Steel Way" ("Стальной путь") plaque in the Petrokrepost railway station, dedicated to the memory of the heroic railway workers on the Road of Life (1972, architects N. M. Meisel' and I. G. Yavein, sculptor G. D. Glinman). On the same site stands a memorial steam locomotive (1975).
- The "Kobona" ("Кобона") plaque in the hamlet of Kobona, dedicated to the Road of Life (1964, architects M. N. Meisel'. A. A. Yakovlev).
- The memorial automobile "The Legendary One-and-a-Half-Tonne" ("Легендарная полуторка") at the 103rd km of the Petrozavodsk highway, at the turn-off for Voibokalo (1974, architect A. D. Levyenkov, artist V. V. Fomyenko).
- The "Voibokalo" ("Войбокало") plaque at the Voibokalo railway station, commemorating the Road of Life (1975, architect S. S. Natonin).

== See also ==
- Arctic convoys of World War II
