= Vsevolozhsk =

Town in Leningrad Oblast, Russia

Vsevolozhsk Всеволожск
- Town
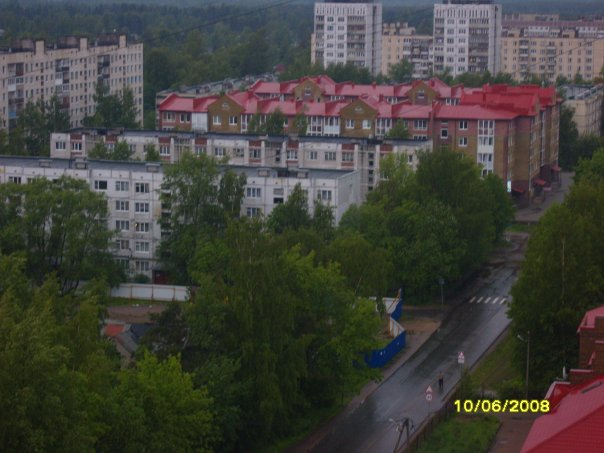
- Vsevolozhsk as seen from the sixteenth floor of an apartment building

- Flag Coat of arms
- Interactive map of Vsevolozhsk
- Location of Vsevolozhsk Vsevolozhsk (Leningrad Oblast)
- Coordinates: 60°02′N 30°40′E
- Country: Russia
- Federal subject: Leningrad Oblast
- Administrative district: Vsevolozhsky District
- Settlement municipal formationSelsoviet: Vsevolozhskoye Settlement Municipal Formation
- Founded: 1892
- Elevation: 30 m (98 ft)

Population (2010 Census)
  - Total: 59,704
  - Estimate (2024): 78,011 (+30.7%)
  - Rank: 275th in 2010

Administrative status
  - Capital of: Vsevolozhsky District, Vsevolozhskoye Settlement Municipal Formation

Municipal status
  - Municipal district: Vsevolozhsky Municipal District
  - Urban settlement: Vsevolozhskoye Urban Settlement
  - Capital of: Vsevolozhsky Municipal District, Vsevolozhskoye Urban Settlement
- Time zone: UTC+3 (MSK)
- Postal codes: 188640–188645, 188649, 188699
- OKTMO ID: 41612101001
- Website: www.vsevolozk.ru

Vsevolozhsk (Russian: Все́воложск, romanized: Vsévoložsk, IPA: [ˈfsʲe.və.ləʂsk]; Finnish: Seuloskoi) is a town and the administrative center of Vsevolozhsky District in Leningrad Oblast, Russia, located on the Karelian Isthmus 24 kilometers (15 mi) east of Saint Petersburg. Historically, the population of Vsevolozhsk was as follows: 59,704 (2010 census); 45,310 (2002 census); 31,946 (1989 Soviet census).

Historical population
Year	Pop.	±%
1926	1,324	—
1939	11,848	+794.9%
1959	27,768	+134.4%
1970	26,978	−2.8%
1979	28,588	+6.0%
1989	31,946	+11.7%
2002	45,310	+41.8%
2010	59,704	+31.8%
2021	79,038	+32.4%
Source: Census data

The town's name comes from manufacturer Vsevolozhsky. In 1941–1944, the Road of Life (the vital road connecting besieged Leningrad with the rest of the Soviet Union) passed through the town. Currently, a considerable part of the population of Vsevolozhsk commutes to Saint Petersburg for work, which is facilitated by the wide-scale construction of apartment buildings in the town.

== History ==
A number of villages historically existed within the current area of the town of Vsevolozhsk. In particular, the village of Ryabovo was first mentioned in 1727. From the end of the 18th century and into the 19th century, Ryabovo belonged to the family of nobles of Vsevolozhsky, after whom the town was eventually named. In 1892, a narrow-gauge railway (Irinovskaya railway), the first such line in Russia, was constructed to transport peat for St. Petersburg's heating. A number of railway stations were opened, including Berngardovka, Vsevolozhskaya, and Melnichny Ruchey. Settlements eventually developed around the stations. The whole area was a part of Shlisselburgsky Uyezd of St. Petersburg Governorate. The settlement of Vsevolozhskoye, around Vsevolozhskaya railway station, was the first settlement in Russia where street gas lamps were installed. On February 14, 1923, Shlisselburgsky Uyezd was merged into Petrogradsky Uyezd. In January 1924, the uyezd and the governorate were renamed Leningradsky.

On August 01, 1927, the uyezds were abolished and Leninsky District, with the administrative center in the settlement of Vsevolozhskoye, was established. The governorates were also abolished and the district became a part of Leningrad Okrug of Leningrad Oblast. On August 15, 1930, the okrugs were abolished as well and the districts were directly subordinated to the oblast. In May 1930, Vsevolozhskaya, Berngardovka, Ilyinsky, Maryino, and Ryabovo were all granted suburban settlement status. On August 19, 1930, Leninsky District was abolished and merged into newly established Leningradsky Prigorodny District with the administrative center in the city of Leningrad. On August 19, 1936, Leningradsky Prigorodny District was abolished and Vsevolozhsky District, with the administrative center in Vsevolozhskoye, was established. On November 27, 1938, the suburban settlements of Vsevolozhskaya, Berngardovka, Ilyinsky, Maryino, and Ryabovo were merged into the urban-type settlement of Vsevolozhsky, which became the administrative center of the district. On February 1, 1963, the urban-type settlement of Vsevolozhsky was renamed Vsevolozhsk and granted the status of town of oblast significance. In 2010, the administrative structure of Leningrad Oblast was harmonized with its municipal structure, and Vsevolozhsk became the town of district significance.

== Administrative and municipal status ==
Within the framework of administrative divisions, Vsevolozhsk serves as the administrative center of Vsevolozhsky District. As an administrative division, it is, together with three rural localities, incorporated within Vsevolozhsky District as Vsevolozhskoye Settlement Municipal Formation. As a municipal division, Vsevolozhskoye Settlement Municipal Formation is incorporated within Vsevolozhsky Municipal District as Vsevolozhskoye Urban Settlement.

== Economy ==
=== Industry ===
Industrial companies in Vsevolozhsk include:

- Rexam PLC Beverage Can Europe and Asia, the world's leading manufacturer of beverage cans
- Ford automobile assembly plant (now closed as of 2019)
- Nokian Tyres tire manufacture
- "MDM-print" printing house
- Merloni TermoSanitari S.p.A., factory producing water-heaters
- Nevsky ceramics factory
- meat-processing factory
- milk factory
- sewing factory
- furniture and construction materials plants

=== Transportation ===
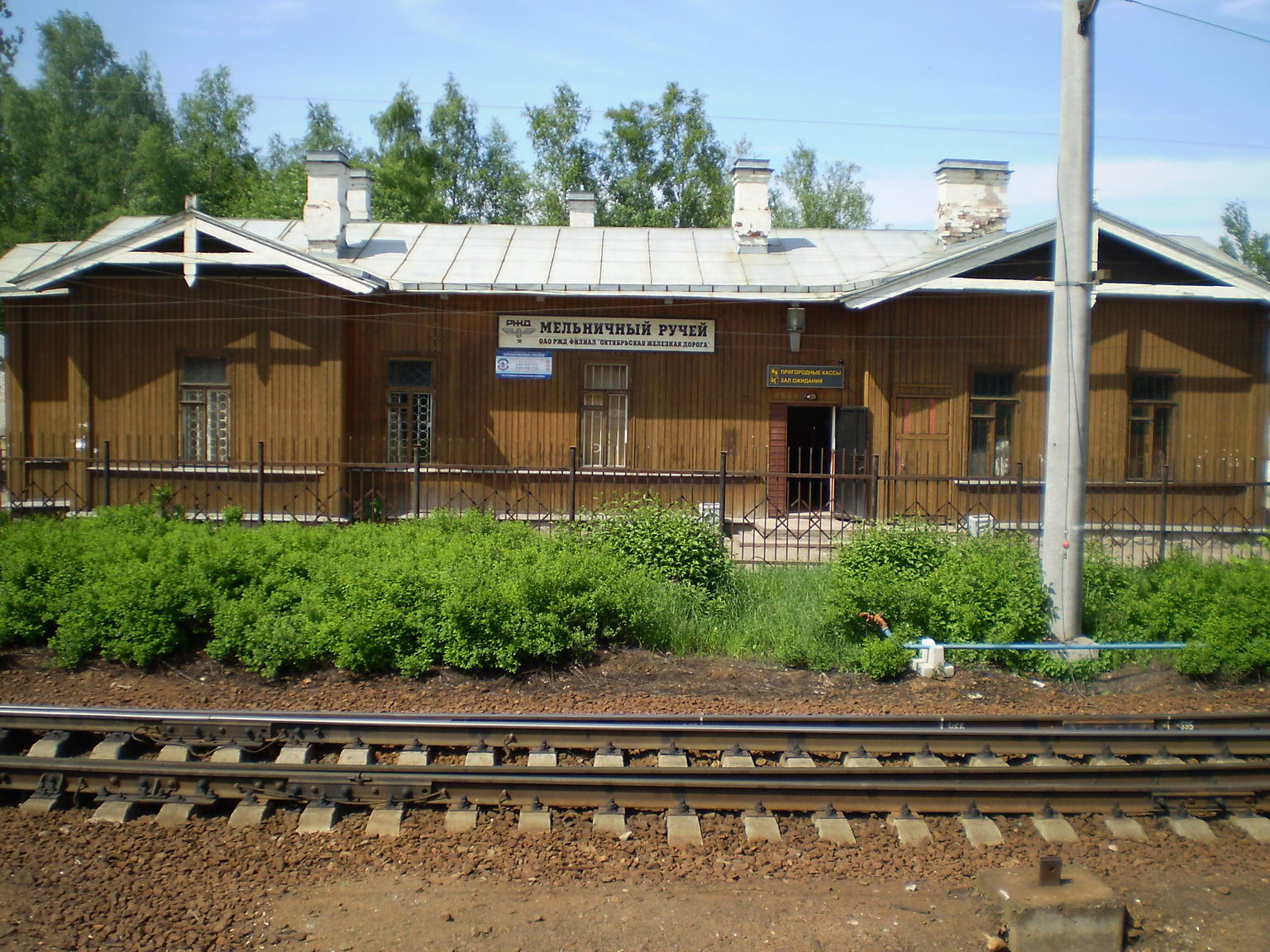
Melnichny Ruchey railway station

In Vsevolozhsk, there are three railway stations, Berngardovka, Vsevolozhskaya, and Melnichny Ruchey. Southbound trains arrive to Finlyandsky Rail Terminal in St. Petersburg. Northbound suburban trains terminate on the stations Nevskaya Dubrovka or Ladozhskoye Ozero. Melnichny Ruchey also serves as the terminal station for suburban trains.

Vsevolozhsk is essentially a suburb of St. Petersburg and is included in the suburban road network.

== Education ==
The town has six schools of general education, music school, art school, and two vocational schools.

== Culture and recreation ==
The town contains eleven cultural heritage monuments of federal significance and additionally thirty-five objects classified as cultural and historical heritage of local significance. These include the Priyutino Estate and the Ryabovo Estate, as well as monuments related to the Road of Life, which was connecting Leningrad with the rest of Soviet Union during the Siege of Leningrad in 1941–1944.

Vsevolozhsk State Museum of History displays collections of local interest. The Priyutino Estate, which belonged to Alexey Olenin, the President of the Imperial Academy of Arts in the 19th century, is a museum as well.

There was an intention to make a resort in the town in the Soviet times. For that purpose a ski jump was built (now dysfunctional), but later this idea was abandoned.

== Notable people ==
- Vladimir Belousov, former ski jumper, Olympic gold medalist
