= Leningrad Okrug =

Former subdivision of the USSR

The Leningrad Okrug (Russian: Ленингра́дский о́круг) was an okrug that briefly existed within the Leningrad Oblast in the Soviet Union, between 1927 and 1930. It covered the city currently known as Saint Petersburg, which was named Leningrad at the time. On 23 July 1930, the okrugs were abolished and the districts were directly subordinated to the oblast.
