= Vsevolozhsky District =

Vsevolozhsky District Всеволожский район (Russian)
- District
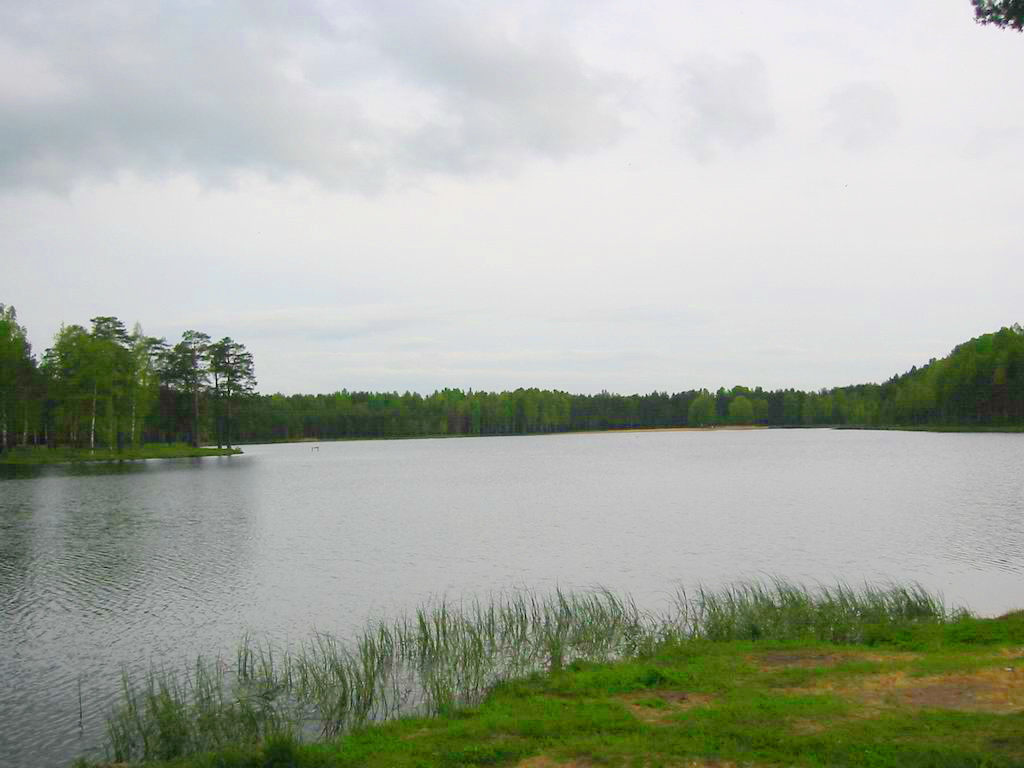
- Lake Korkinskoye in Vsevolozhsky District

- Flag Coat of arms
- Location of Vsevolozhsky District in Leningrad Oblast
- Coordinates: 60°00′54″N 30°39′04″E
- Country: Russia
- Federal subject: Leningrad Oblast
- Established: August 19, 1936
- Administrative center: Vsevolozhsk

Area
  - Total: 3,036.4 km^{2} (1,172.4 sq mi)

Population (2010 Census)
  - Total: 153,045
  - Density: 50.403/km^{2} (130.54/sq mi)
  - Urban: 29.9%
  - Rural: 70.1%

Administrative structure
  - Administrative divisions: 11 Settlement municipal formations
  - Inhabited localities: 2 cities/towns, 6 urban-type settlements, 146 rural localities

Municipal structure
  - Municipally incorporated as: Vsevolozhsky Municipal District
  - Municipal divisions: 8 urban settlements, 11 rural settlements
- Time zone: UTC+3 (MSK)
- OKTMO ID: 41612000
- Website: http://www.vsevreg.ru/

Vsevolozhsky District (Russian: Все́воложский райо́н) is an administrative and municipal district (raion), one of the seventeen in Leningrad Oblast, Russia. It is located in the central northwestern part of the oblast on the Karelian Isthmus and borders with Priozersky District in the north, Kirovsky District in the south, Vyborgsky District in the northwest, Nevsky, Krasnogvardeysky, Kalininsky, Vyborgsky, and Kurortny Districts of the federal city of St. Petersburg in the west, and is washed by Lake Ladoga in the east. The area of the district is 3,036.4 square kilometers (1,172.4 sq mi). Its administrative center is the town of Vsevolozhsk. Population (excluding the administrative center): 153,045 (2010 census); 131,233 (2002 Census); 135,318 (1989 Soviet census).

== Geography ==
The Okhta River flows through the district while the Neva defines its southeastern border. There are many lakes in the district, the most significant of them being Lakes Lembolovskoye, Kavgolovskoye, Khepoyarvi, and Voloyarvi. The landscape is mostly flat in the south and east and hilly in the west and northwest. Altitudes range between 170–180 meters (560–590 ft) above sea level in the north to less than 1 meter (3 ft 3 in) in the south.

Low moraine ridges with the relative height of 10–20 meters (33–66 ft) are located parallel to the shore of Lake Ladoga, and along the coastal lowlands are the coastal dunes which reach the height of 3–5 meters (9.8–16.4 ft). About 60% of the district's territory is covered by forests, mostly pine. Swamps occupy another 3.6%.

== History ==
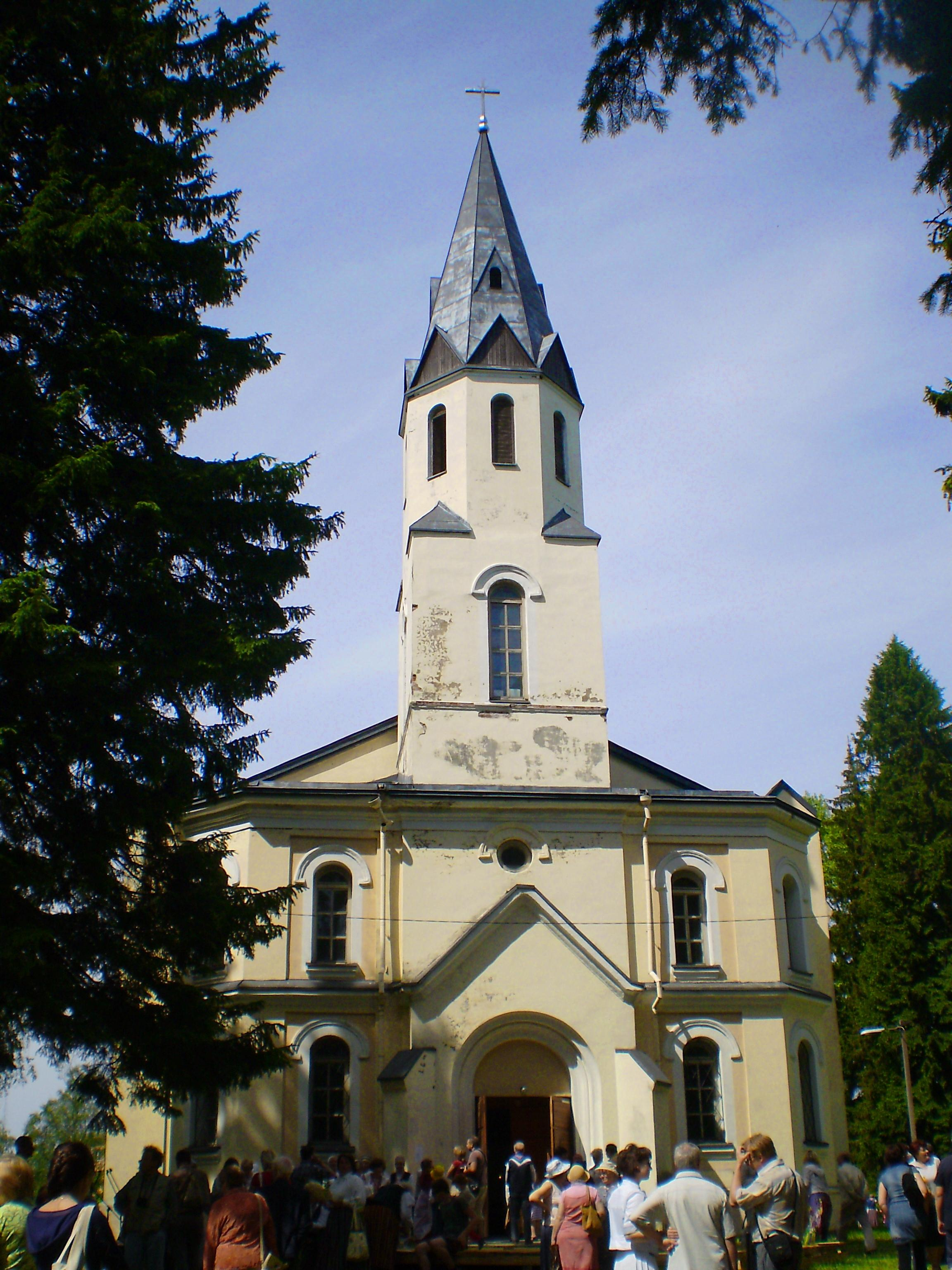
Sts. Peter and Paul Lutheran (Finnish) Church, Toksovo

Originally, the area of the district was populated by Finnic peoples, and historically was changing hands between Sweden and Russia; in particular, at some point it belonged to the Novgorod Republic, and from the 15th century, it was annexed together with all Novgorod Lands by the Grand Duchy of Moscow; it belonged to the Vodskaya pyatina, one of the five pyatinas of Novgorod Lands. In 1617, according to the Treaty of Stolbovo, the west of the area was transferred to Sweden, and in 1721, according to the Treaty of Nystad, it was transferred back by Russia.

In the course of the administrative reform carried out in 1708 by Peter the Great, the area was included into Ingermanland Governorate (known since 1710 as Saint Petersburg Governorate). In 1727, it became a part of Saint Petersburgsky Uyezd, and in 1755, Shlisselburgsky Uyezd was established, and the current area of the district became split between the two uyezds. In 1914, the uyezd and the governorate were renamed Leningradsky. On February 14, 1923 Shlisselburgsky Uyezd was merged into Petrogradsky Uyezd. In January, 1924 the uyezd and the governorate were renamed Leningradsky.

On August 1, 1927, the uyezds were abolished and Leninsky District, with the administrative center in the settlement of Vsevolozhskoye, was established. The governorates were also abolished, and the district was a part of Leningrad Okrug of Leningrad Oblast. It included parts of former Leningradsky Uyezd. On July 23, 1930, the okrugs were abolished as well, and the districts were directly subordinated to the oblast. On August 19, 1930 Leninsky District was abolished and merged into newly established Leningradsky Prigorodny District with the administrative center in the city of Leningrad.

Another district established on August 1, 1927 was Pargolovsky District with the administrative center in the settlement of Pargolovo III. It was a part of Leningrad Okrug of Leningrad Oblast and included parts of former Leningradsky Uyezd. On August 19, 1930 Pargolovsky District was abolished and split between Kuyvozovsky District and newly established Leningradsky Prigorodny District.

On August 19, 1936 Leningradsky Prigorodny District was abolished and split between the town of Leningrad and Krasnoselsky, Slutsky, Mginsky, Vsevolozhsky and Pargolovsky Districts. Krasnoselsky, Slutsky, Vsevolozhsky, and Pargolovsky Districts were established on that day to accommodate the areas previously belonging to Leningradsky Prigorodny District.

On August 19, 1936 Vsevolozhsky District, with the administrative center in the suburban settlement of Vsevolozhskoye, was established on the areas which previously belonged to Leningradsky Prigorodny District. It also included urban-type settlements of Imeni Morozova and Dubrovka. On November 27, 1938 a number of suburban settlements, including Vsevolozhskoye, were merged into the urban-type settlement of Vsevolozhsky, which became the center of the district. During World War II, the district was not occupied, and played an important role in the Siege of Leningrad: The goods were transported to Leningrad across the ice on the Lake Ladoga, to Kokkorevo, and then to Leningrad across the district (the Road of Life). On December 8, 1955 some areas in the south of the district were transferred to the city of Leningrad. On February 1, 1963 the urban-type settlement of Vsevolozhsky was renamed Vsevolozhsk and granted the status of town of oblast significance. In 2010, the administrative division of Leningrad Oblast was harmonized with the municipal division, and Vsevolozhsk was made the town of district significance. On 29 June 2018, the former village of Kudrovo was granted a town status.

Another district established on August 19, 1936 was Pargolovsky District with the administrative center in the settlement of Pargolovo. It included areas which previously belonged to Leningradsky Prigorodny District and Toksovsky District. On November 9, 1938 Pargolovo became an urban-type settlement. During World War II, in Pargolovsky District battles between Soviet and Finnish armies took place. On April 3, 1954 Pargolovsky District was abolished and split between the city of Leningrad and Vsevolozhsky District. In particular, the urban-type settlement of Pargolovo was transferred to Leningrad.

On August 1, 1927, Kuyvozovsky District with the administrative center in the village of Kuyvoz was established as well. It was a part of Leningrad Okrug of Leningrad Oblast and included parts of former Leningradsky Uyezd. On October 30, 1930 the administrative center of the district was moved to the suburban settlement of Toksovo. In February 1931 Kuyvozovsky District was transformed into a Finnish national district. On March 20, 1936 it was renamed Toksovsky District. On February 22, 1939 Toksovsky District was abolished and merged into Pargolovsky District.

== Economy ==
=== Industry ===
The district is heavily industrialized as it includes suburbs of Saint Petersburg. The industrial enterprises serve chemical, machine building (including the Ford Vsevolozhsk Assembly plant), and timber industries, as well as the others. There is a growing high-tech component in the industry of the district. Part of the population commutes to Saint Petersburg for work.

=== Agriculture ===
The agriculture in the district is performed by a variety of farms, including nine (as of 2012) large-scale agricultural enterprises.

=== Transportation ===
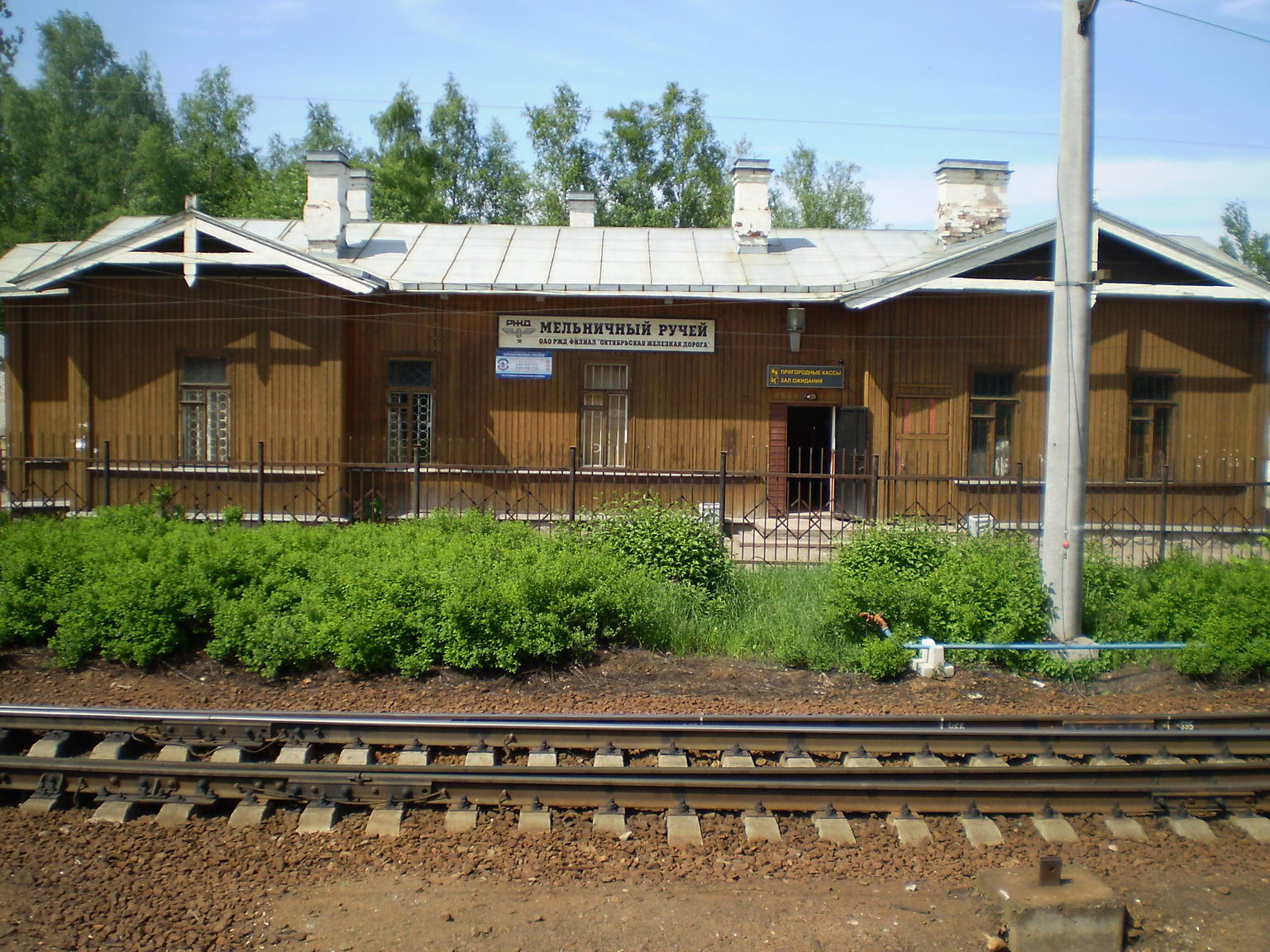
Melnichny Ruchey station, Vsevolozhsk

A number of railways, originating from the Ladozhsky and Finlyandsky railway stations of Saint Petersburg cross the district. Saint Petersburg – Hiitola railroad runs through Toksovo to Sosnovo and Priozersk. Another line runs to Vsevolozhsk (Melnichny Ruchey railway station) and splits into two, one terminating at Ladozhskoye Ozero railway station, and another one at Nevskaya Dubrovka railway station. One more railway line cross the Neva and runs to Mga.

One of the stations of Saint Petersburg Metro, Devyatkino, is located in Vsevolozhsky District, outside the city of Saint Petersburg. Standard fares apply.

The M18 highway connecting Saint Petersburg with Petrozavodsk and Murmansk crosses the southern part of the district. Generally, the road network of the district is dense and includes roads connecting Saint Petersburg and Shlisselburg with Priozersk, and Sertolovo with Vyborg.

== Culture and recreation ==
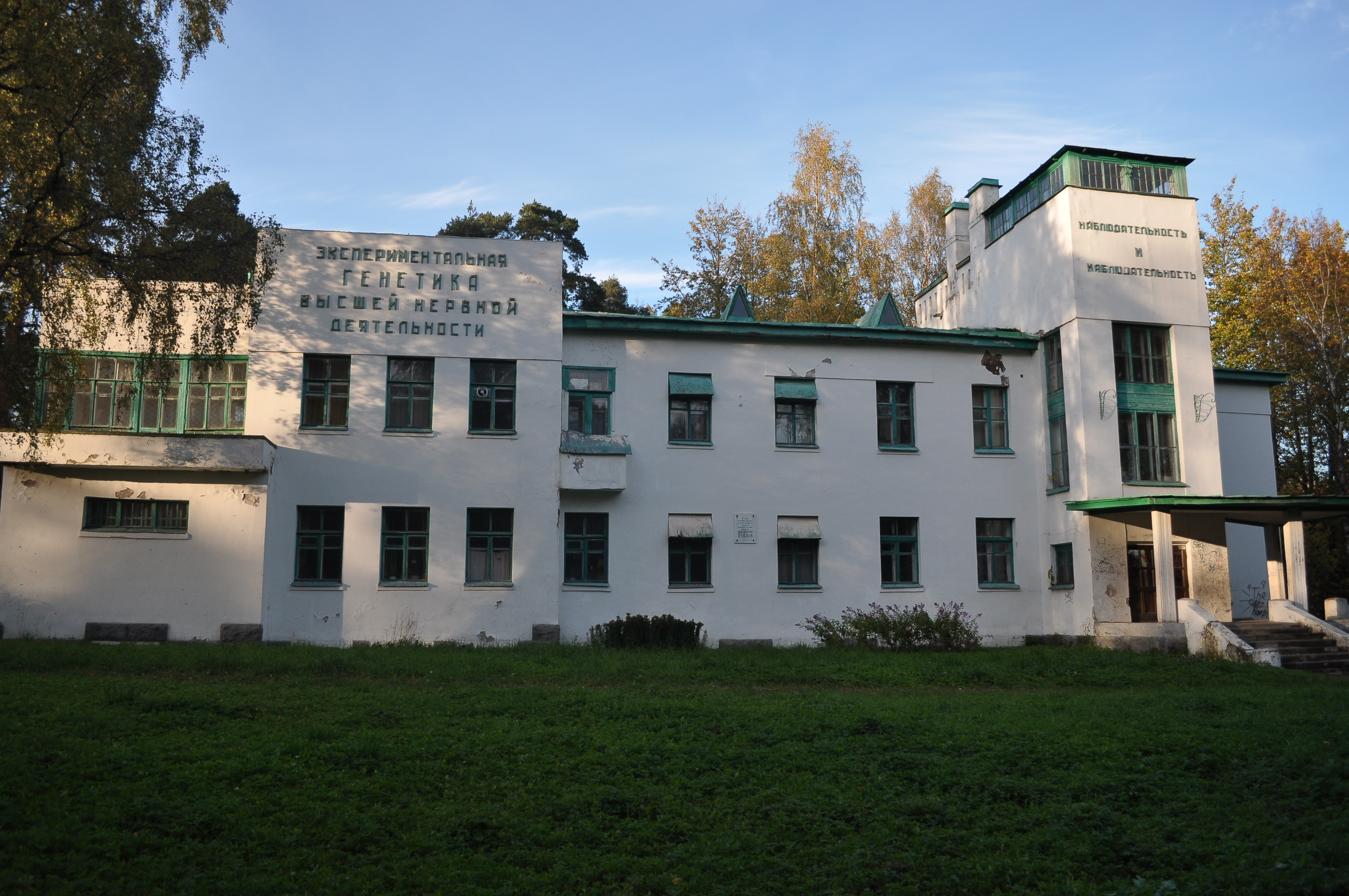
The former laboratory of Ivan Pavlov, currently a research institution

The district contains 52 cultural heritage monuments of federal significance and additionally 131 objects classified as cultural and historical heritage of local significance. The federally protected monuments include the Priyutino Estate in Berngardovka, Vsevolozhsk, the complex of buildings around the laboratory of Ivan Pavlov in the settlement of Pavlovo, the Ryabovo Estate in Vsevolozhsk, and various monuments related to the events of the Siege of Leningrad in 1941—1944.

Vsevolozhsk State Museum of History is located in the town of Vsevolozhsk and displays collections of local interest. The Priyutino Estate, which belonged to Alexey Olenin, a president of the Imperial Academy of Arts in the 19th century, is a museum as well. Several state museums in the district describe events related to the Siege of Leningrad.
