= Shlisselburgsky Uyezd =

Sub division during the Russian Empire

Shlisselburgsky Uyezd (Шлиссельбургский уезд) was one of the subdivisions of the Saint Petersburg Governorate of the Russian Empire. It was situated in the northeastern part of the governorate. Its administrative centre was Shlisselburg. In terms of present-day administrative borders, the territory of Schlisselburgsky Uyezd is divided between the Kirovsky, Vsevolozhsky and Tosnensky districts of Leningrad Oblast.

== Demographics ==
At the time of the Russian Empire Census of 1897, Shlisselburgsky Uyezd had a population of 54,904. Of these, 55.3% spoke Russian, 39.3% Finnish, 1.8% German, 1.7% Estonian, 0.6% Polish, 0.3% Yiddish, 0.3% Latvian, 0.2% Belarusian, 0.1% Ukrainian, 0.1% French, 0.1% Swedish and 0.1% English as their native language.
