= 1978 European Athletics Championships – Women's 400 metres hurdles =

Women's 400 metres hurdles at the European Athletics Championships
- Venue: Stadion Evžena Rošického
- Location: Prague, Czechoslovakia
- Dates: 1 September 1978 (round 1); 2 September 1978 (semi-finals and final)
- Competitors: 28 from 17 nations
- Winning time: 54.89 s WR

Medalists
gold medal	Tatyana Zelentsova	Soviet Union
silver medal	Silvia Hollmann	West Germany
bronze medal	Karin Roßley	East Germany

The women's 400 metres hurdles at the 1978 European Athletics Championships took place in three rounds at the Stadion Evžena Rošického in Prague, then Czechoslovakia, on 1 and 2 September 1978.

== Results ==
=== Round 1 ===
The four heats of round 1 were held on 1 September.

Results of the first heat of round 1
Rank	Name	Nation	Time	Notes
1	Brigitte Köhn	East Germany	56.83	Q
2	Krystyna Kacperczyk	Poland	57.18	Q
3	Erika Weinstein	West Germany	57.56	Q
4	Mary Appleby	Ireland	57.66	Q
5	Eva Mohacsi	Hungary	59.61	
6	Rosa-Maria Colorado	Spain	59.76	
7	Kristianne Staut	Belgium	68.51	

Results of the second heat of round 1
Rank	Name	Nation	Time	Notes
1	Silvia Hollmann	West Germany	57.50	Q
2	Karin Roßley	East Germany	58.07	Q
3	Hilde Fredriksen	Norway	58.12	NJR, Q
4	Ingrīda Barkāne	Soviet Union	58.29	Q
5	Doina Badescu	Romania	59.72	
6	Wilma Hillen	Netherlands	59.97	
7	Kamila Jozefíková	Czechoslovakia	60.61	

Results of the third heat of round 1
Rank	Name	Nation	Time	Notes
1	Liz Sutherland	Great Britain	57.61	Q
2	Marina Makeyeva	Soviet Union	57.66	Q
3	Lea Alaerts	Belgium	57.74	Q
4	Genowefa Błaszak	Poland	58.11	Q
5	Anne Aren	Sweden	59.32	
6	Montserrat Pujol	Spain	60.21	
7	Dana Wildová	Czechoslovakia	60.97	

Results of the fourth heat of round 1
Rank	Name	Nation	Time	Notes
1	Anita Weiß	East Germany	56.19	CR, Q
2	Tatyana Zelentsova	Soviet Union	56.44	Q
3	Anne Michel	Belgium	58.19	Q
4	Svilenka Filipova	Bulgaria	58.31	Q
5	Danièle Lairloup	France	58.47	
6	Lisbeth Helbling	Switzerland	58.57	
7	Hana Slámová	Czechoslovakia	60.77	

=== Semi-finals ===
The two heats of the semi-finals were held on 2 September.

Results of the first heat of the semi-finals
Rank	Name	Nation	Time	Notes
1	Silvia Hollmann	West Germany	56.08	CR, Q
2	Anita Weiß	East Germany	56.19	Q
3	Krystyna Kacperczyk	Poland	56.20	Q
4	Karin Roßley	East Germany	56.27	Q
5	Mary Appleby	Ireland	57.36	
6	Marina Makeyeva	Soviet Union	57.49	
7	Lea Alaerts	Belgium	57.68	
	Svilenka Filipova	Bulgaria	DNF	

Results of the second heat of the semi-finals
Rank	Name	Nation	Time	Notes
1	Tatyana Zelentsova	Soviet Union	55.89	CR, Q
2	Ingrīda Barkāne	Soviet Union	56.32	Q
3	Brigitte Köhn	East Germany	56.55	Q
4	Genowefa Błaszak	Poland	56.67	Q
5	Erika Weinstein	West Germany	57.22	
6	Hilde Fredriksen	Norway	58.35	
7	Anne Michel	Belgium	58.67	
8	Liz Sutherland	Great Britain	62.83	

=== Final ===
The final was held on 2 September.

Results of the final
Rank	Name	Nation	Time	Notes
1st place, gold medalist(s)	Tatyana Zelentsova	Soviet Union	54.89	WR
2nd place, silver medalist(s)	Silvia Hollmann	West Germany	55.14	NR
3rd place, bronze medalist(s)	Karin Roßley	East Germany	55.36	NR
4	Brigitte Köhn	East Germany	55.46	
5	Krystyna Kacperczyk	Poland	55.55	NR
6	Anita Weiß	East Germany	55.63	
7	Ingrīda Barkāne	Soviet Union	55.97	
8	Genowefa Błaszak	Poland	57.72	
