= Imeni Sverdlova =

Imeni Sverdlova may refer to:

- Imeni Sverdlova, Kazakhstan, a village in Almaty Province, Kazakhstan
- Imeni Sverdlova, Russia, an urban-type settlement in Leningrad Oblast, Russia
