= Sergey Petrov =

Sergey Petrov may refer to:

- Sergey Anatolyevich Petrov (born 1954), Russian businessman and politician
- Sergey Petrov (politician) (born 1965), Russian politician
- Sergei Petrov (footballer, born 1974), Russian football player and manager
- Sergei Petrov (born 1991), Russian footballer
- Sergei Petrov, a pseudonym used by Bob Dylan for his work on Masked and Anonymous
- Serhiy Petrov (born 1997), Ukrainian footballer

== See also ==
- Petrov (surname)
