= Tatyana Zelentsova =

Soviet Russian hurdler

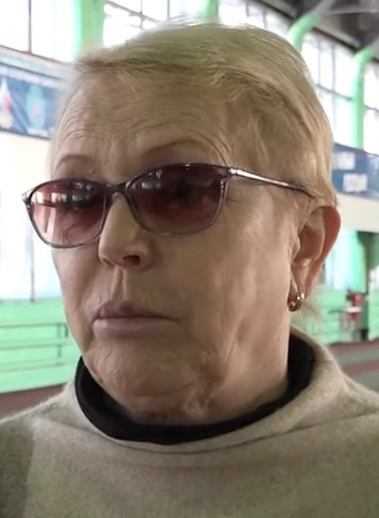
- Zelentsova in 2018

Personal information
- Full name: Tatyana Petrovna Zelentsova
- Citizenship: Russian
- Born: 5 August 1948 (age 77) Novorossiysk, Russian SFSR, Soviet Union
- Height: 170 cm (5 ft 7 in)
- Weight: 58 kg (128 lb)

Sport
- Sport: Athletics
- Event: 400 m hurdles

Achievements and titles
- Personal best: 54.89 s (1978)
Medal record
Women's athletics
Representing the Soviet Union
European Championships
| Gold medal – first place | 1978 Prague | 400 m hurdles |

Tatyana Petrovna Zelentsova (Russian: Татьяна Петровна Зеленцова; born 5 August 1948) is a former Soviet Russian hurdler. She set two world records in the women's 400 metres hurdles and won the European Championship in 1978. After her athletic career she remained active in the sport as a coach.

== Biography ==
Zelentsova was born in Novorossiysk on 5 August 1948. Early in her career, Zelentsova competed mostly in the 100 metres hurdles, an event in which she did not reach the international top level; when the women's 400 metres hurdles became a mainstream event in the mid-1970s, she switched to the new event and adapted to it rapidly. In 1976 the women's 400 metres hurdles were contested at the Soviet national championships for the first time; Zelentsova won. She was then sidelined by kidney problems, which required hospitalization and threatened her career; she recovered and returned in top shape. Two weeks before the 1978 European Championships Zelentsova broke the world record in Podolsk, running 55.31. At the European Championships in Prague she broke the record again, winning in 54.89; the silver medalist, Silvia Hollmann of West Germany, was also under the previous world record.

Between 1979 and 1983 Zelentsova worked as a coach in Tashkent while continuing her own athletic career. She won the semi-final at the 1979 European Cup, then placed third at the 1979 Soviet Spartakiad; the winner, Marina Makeyeva, broke her world record. Zelentsova's students in Tashkent included relay world champion Sergey Lovachov.

Zelentsova moved to the United States in 1989, settling in Jonesboro, Arkansas with Bill Bell, the brother of champion vaulter Earl Bell. She continued coaching in America; her pupils in Arkansas have included LaVonna Martin, who won silver in the 100 metres hurdles at the 1992 Summer Olympics, as well as Russian runners Ekaterina Kostetskaya and Anastasiya Kapachinskaya.

== National titles ==
- Soviet Athletics Championships
  - 400 metres hurdles: 1976, 1978

== International competitions ==
| Year | Competition | Venue | Position | Event | Notes |
|---|---|---|---|---|---|
| 1978 | European Championships | Prague, Czechoslovakia | 1st | 400 m hurdles | 54.89 |
| 1979 | Spartakiad | Moscow, Russia | 3rd | 400 m hurdles | 55.64 |
| 1979 | European Cup semi-final | Cwmbran, United Kingdom | 1st | 400 m hurdles | 56.87 |

== See also ==
- List of European Athletics Championships medalists (women)

Records
| Preceded by Krystyna Kacperczyk | Women's 400 metres hurdles world record holder 19 August 1978 – 27 July 1979 | Succeeded by Marina Makeyeva |
