= Women's 400 metres hurdles world record progression =

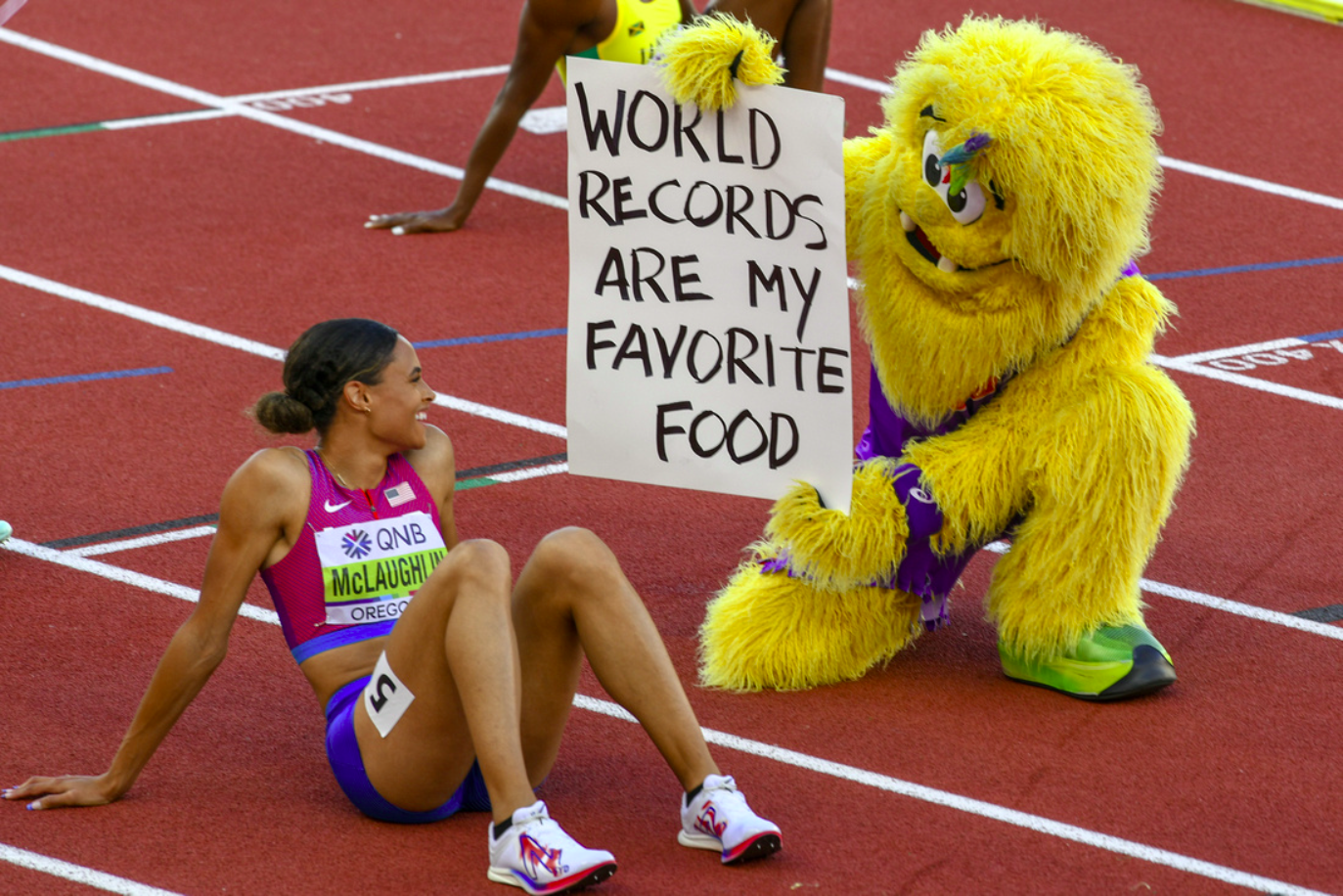
Sydney McLaughlin-Levrone after setting her world record of 50.68 s, sitting next to the mascot of the 2022 World Athletics Championships

The women's 400 metres hurdles is an outdoor track event over a distance of 400 metres with ten hurdles at the height of 76.2 cm (30 inches). The world records of this women's event have been recognised by World Athletics (called the International Association of Athletics Federations until 2019) since 1974. Every world record is fully automatically timed and undergoes a ratification process that includes doping control.

The first world record of 56.51 seconds was set by Krystyna Kacperczyk of Poland in 1974. Since then, the world record has been broken twenty-three times: six times in the 1970s, six times in the 1980s, two times in the 1990s, one time in the 2000s, two times in the 2010s, and six times in the 2020s. Each improvement was 0.03 seconds (1985, 2024) to 0.77 seconds (1977) faster than the previous record. Up to the 1980s, eight of thirteen records were set by athletes from the Soviet Union, while since the 1990s, nine of eleven records were set by athletes from the United States. The longest-standing world record of 52.34 seconds was set by Yuliya Pechonkina of Russia in 2003 and stood for almost 16 years until 2019. The current world record of 50.37 seconds was set by Sydney McLaughlin-Levrone of the United States in 2024. McLaughlin-Levrone has set a total of six world records in this event, more than any other athlete.

== Progression ==
Ratified
Not ratified
Ratified but later rescinded
Pending ratification

World records of the women's 400 metres hurdles
Date	Athlete	Nation	Time in s	Location	Ref.
13 July 1974	Krystyna Kacperczyk	Poland	56.51	Augsburg, West Germany	
26 June 1977	Tatyana Storozheva	Soviet Union	55.74	Karl-Marx-Stadt, East Germany	
13 August 1977	Karin Rossley	East Germany	55.63	Helsinki, Finland	
18 August 1978	Krystyna Kacperczyk	Poland	55.44	West Berlin, West Germany	
19 August 1978	Tatyana Zelentsova	Soviet Union	55.31	Podolsk, Soviet Union	
2 September 1978	Tatyana Zelentsova	Soviet Union	54.89	Prague, Czechoslovakia	
27 July 1979	Marina Makeyeva (Note: Marina Makeyeva was the maiden name of Marina Stepanova.)	Soviet Union	54.78	Moscow, Soviet Union	
18 May 1980	Karin Rossley	East Germany	54.28	Jena, East Germany	
11 June 1983	Anna Ambrazienė	Soviet Union	54.02	Moscow, Soviet Union	
22 June 1984	Margarita Ponomaryova	Soviet Union	53.58	Kyiv, Soviet Union	
22 September 1985	Sabine Busch	East Germany	53.55	East Berlin, East Germany	
30 August 1986	Marina Stepanova	Soviet Union	53.32	Stuttgart, West Germany	
17 September 1986	Marina Stepanova	Soviet Union	52.94	Tashkent, Soviet Union	
19 August 1993	Sally Gunnell	Great Britain	52.74	Stuttgart, Germany	
11 August 1995	Kim Batten	United States	52.61	Gothenburg, Sweden	
8 August 2003	Yuliya Pechonkina	Russia	52.34	Tula, Russia	
28 July 2019	Dalilah Muhammad	United States	52.20	Des Moines, Iowa, United States	
4 October 2019	Dalilah Muhammad	United States	52.16	Doha, Qatar	
27 June 2021	Sydney McLaughlin (Note: Sydney McLaughlin was the maiden name of Sydney McLaughlin-Levrone.)	United States	51.90	Eugene, Oregon, United States	
4 August 2021	Sydney McLaughlin	United States	51.46	Tokyo, Japan	
25 June 2022	Sydney McLaughlin-Levrone	United States	51.41	Eugene, Oregon, United States	
22 July 2022	Sydney McLaughlin-Levrone	United States	50.68	Eugene, Oregon, United States	
30 June 2024	Sydney McLaughlin-Levrone	United States	50.65	Eugene, Oregon, United States	
8 August 2024	Sydney McLaughlin-Levrone	United States	50.37	Paris, France	

== See also ==
- Men's 400 metres hurdles world record progression
- Hurdling
