= 2017 Kingisepp by-election =

2017 Kingisepp constituency by-election
- 10 September 2017
- Turnout: 24.6%
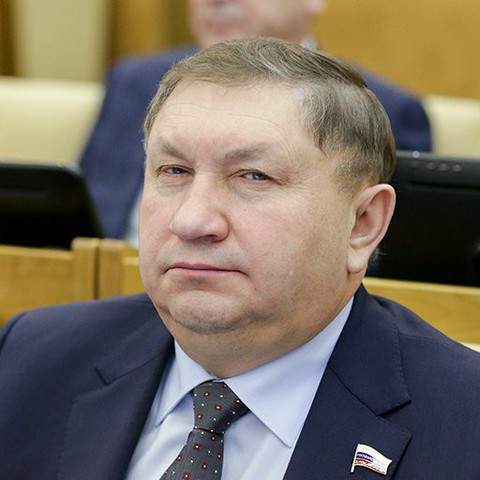
Nominee	Sergey Yakhnyuk	Nikolay Kuzmin
Party	United Russia	CPRF
Popular vote	61,420	11,269
Percentage	61.58%	11.3%
Deputy of the State Duma before election
Sergey Naryshkin
United Russia
Elected Deputy of the State Duma
Sergey Yakhnyuk
United Russia

Legislative elections were held in Russia on 18 September 2016. On 5 October 2016 Sergey Naryshkin resigned because of his appointment as Director of SVR. On 14 June, the Central Election Commission scheduled an election in the Kingisepp constituency for 10 September 2017.

== Results by 112 Kingisepp constituency 2016 ==
Candidates	Party	Votes	%
Armen Ananyan	Greens	2,529	1.3
Alexander Gabitov	Civic Platform	1,541	0.8
Anatoly Golosov	Rodina	3,755	2.0
Vyacheslav Dyubkov	Liberal Democratic Party	14,413	7.6
Nikolay Kuzmin	Communist Party	21,424	11.4
Marina Lyubushkina	A Just Russia	22,823	12.1
Sergey Naryshkin	United Russia	98,999	52.5
Viktor Perov	Communists of Russia	6,894	3.7
Alexander Senotrusov	Yabloko	5,329	2.8
Dmitry Skurikhin	People's Freedom Party	3,194	1.7
Invalid votes		7,701	1.9

== United Russia primary ==
On May 28, 2017, the United Russia held primary for the selection of candidate in Kingisepp's Constituency. The primary was attended by eight people. It was possible to vote for multiple candidates.

Candidate	Party	%
Sergey Yakhnyuk	United Russia	40.30%
Viktor Kabatsky	United Russia	20.86%
Anton Moroz	Independent	20.61%
Yelena Diniskina	Independent	4.22%
Olga Ignatyeva	Independent	3.69%
Arthur Portalenko	Independent	3.47%
Damir Urusov	Independent	2.08%
Valery Tsiganok	Independent	1.89%
Turnout		9.23%

== Candidates ==
=== Registered ===
- United Russia: Sergey Yakhnyuk, Vice-Governor of Leningrad Oblast - Chairman of regional Committee for agriculture and fishing industry
- Communist Party: Nikolay Kuzmin, former deputy of State Duma (2014-2016), 2016 candidate for State Duma for this seat
- Liberal Democratic Party: Natalya Kruglova, actress
- A Just Russia: Marina Lyubushkina, 2016 candidate for State Duma for this seat
- Communists of Russia: Konstantin Zhukov, executive secretary of the Central Committee of Communists of Russia
- Yabloko (with the support of the People's Freedom Party): Sergey Gulyaev, journalist, Second Chechen War veteran, former deputy of Legislative Assembly of Leningrad Oblast (2002-2007)
- Party of Pensioners: Andrey Shirokov, president of Assistance Fund for Regional Projects and Programs, former deputy of Moscow City Duma (1997-2001), 2016 candidate for State Duma
- Rodina: Valery Shinkarenko, lawyer, 2016 candidate for State Duma in the Volkhov constituency
- Patriots of Russia: Serik Urazov, businessman

== Result ==
Summary of the 10 September 2017 Russian by-election in Kingisepp's Single-member Constituency election results
Candidate	Party	Votes	%
Sergey Yakhnyuk	United Russia	61,420	61.6%
Nikolay Kuzmin	Communist Party	11,269	11.3%
Marina Lyubushkina	A Just Russia	6,942	7.0%
Natalya Kruglova	Liberal Democratic Party	5,198	5.2%
Andrey Shirokov	Party of Pensioners	3,714	3.7%
Sergey Gulyaev	Yabloko	3,138	3.2%
Konstantin Zhukov	Communists of Russia	3,040	3.0%
Valery Shinkarenko	Rodina	1,109	1.1%
Serik Urazov	Patriots of Russia	758	0.7%
Total		96,588	100%
