= Sergey Yakhnyuk =

Russian politician

- Сергей Яхнюк
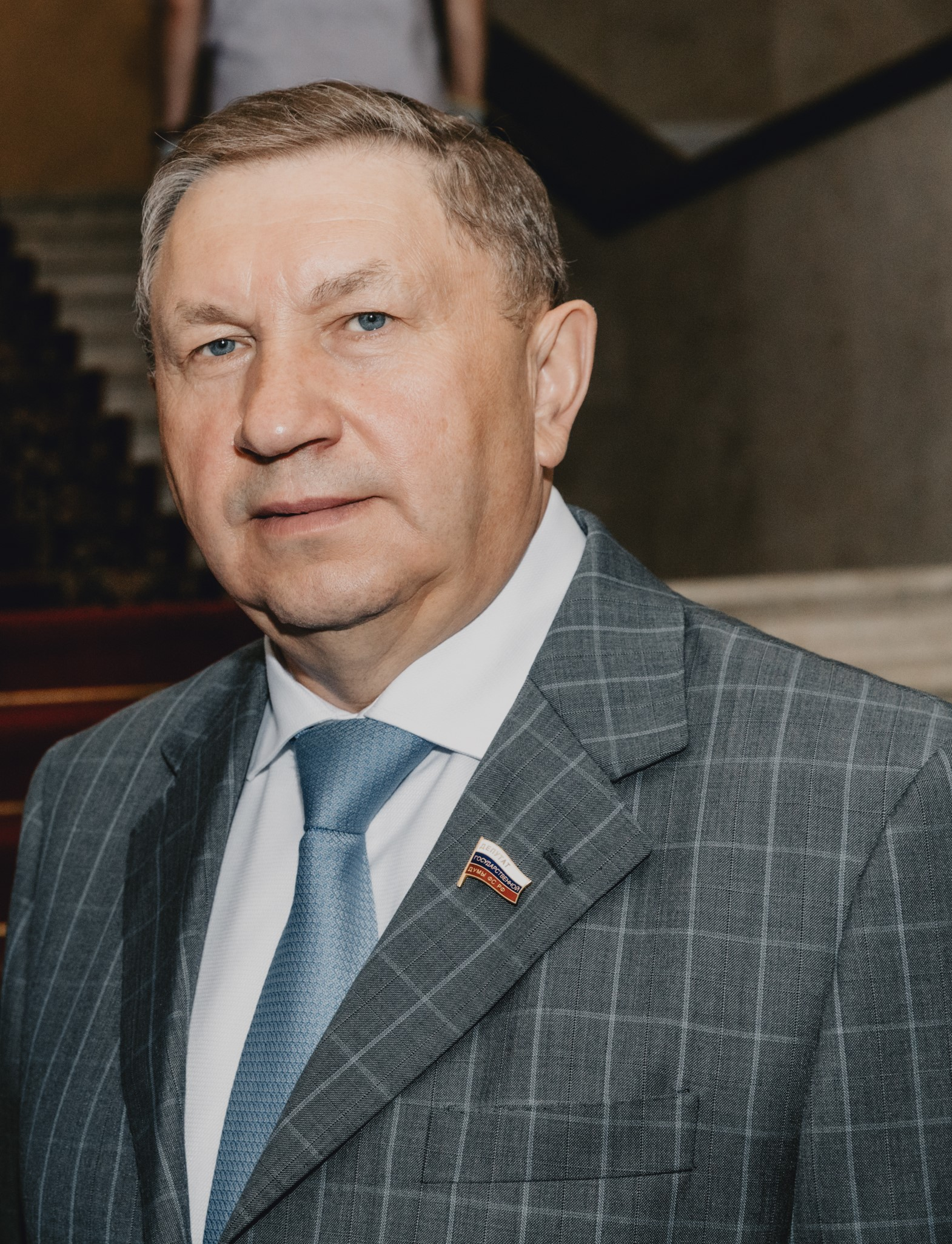

Member of the State Duma for Leningrad Oblast
- Incumbent
- Assumed office 10 October 2017
- Preceded by: Sergey Naryshkin (Note: refused mandate following the 18 September 2016 election due to appointment as head of the FSB.)
- Constituency: Kingisepp (No. 112)

Personal details
- Born: 3 July 1962 (age 64) Altynivka, Sumy Oblast, Ukrainian SSR, USSR
- Party: United Russia
- Education: Saint Petersburg State Agrarian University

Sergey Vasilievich Yakhnyuk (Russian: Сергей Васильевич Яхнюк; born 3 July 1962, Altynivka, Sumy Oblast) is a Russian political figure and a deputy of the 7th and 8th State Dumas.

From 1984 to 1989 he was the chief agronomist of the sovkhoz Pervomaisky in the Leningrad Oblast. In 1986-1989, he was the first secretary of the City Committee of the CPSU. From 1997 to 1999, he was the Deputy of the Legislative Assembly of Leningrad Oblast. On 19 September 1999 he was elected Head of Administration of the Priozersky District of the Leningrad Oblast. From 2007 to 2017, he worked at the administration of the Leningrad Oblast. On 9 August 2007 he was appointed Vice Governor of the Leningrad Oblast. In 2017, following the resignation of Sergey Naryshkin in order to become direct of the Foreign Intelligence Service, Yakhnyuk was elected Deputy of the 7th State Duma in the Kingisepp by-election. In September 2021, he was re-elected in Kingisepp as deputy for the 8th State Duma.

== Sanctions ==
He was sanctioned by the UK government on 11 March 2022 in relation to the Russo-Ukrainian War.
