= Men's 400 metres hurdles world record progression =

The first world record in the men's 400 metres hurdles was recognised by the International Association of Athletics Federations in 1912. That inaugural record was the performance by Charles Bacon at the 1908 Olympics.

Three athletes, all from the United States, have had long-standing records. Glenn Hardin broke the world record three times and was the record holder for over 21 years, between 1932 and 1953. Edwin Moses set his first record in 1976 and improved his own world record three times. He held the record from 1976 until 1992, when it was beaten by Kevin Young with a time of 46.78 seconds at the 1992 Barcelona Olympics.

Young's record stood for nearly 29 years, until Karsten Warholm broke it during the Diamond League event at his homefield of Bislett during the 2021 Bislett Games. The new world record was 46.70 seconds. On August 3, 2021, Warholm improved his record again in the Tokyo Olympics 400 meter hurdles final. On August 27, 2026, the record was broken at the Diamond League event in Zurich by Alison dos Santos and stands at 45.80.

As of June 21, 2009, 21 world records have been ratified by the IAAF in the event.

== Progression 1912–76 ==
Time	Auto	Athlete	Date	Location
55.0		Charles Bacon (USA)	July 22, 1908	London
54.0		Frank Loomis (USA)	August 16, 1920	Antwerp
53.8		Sten Pettersson (SWE)	October 4, 1925	Paris
52.6y		John Gibson (USA)	July 2, 1927	Lincoln
52.0		Morgan Taylor (USA)	July 4, 1928	Philadelphia
52.0	51.85	Glenn Hardin (USA)	August 1, 1932	Los Angeles
51.8		Glenn Hardin (USA)	June 30, 1934	Milwaukee
50.6		Glenn Hardin (USA)	July 26, 1934	Stockholm
50.4		Yuriy Lituyev (USSR)	September 20, 1953	Budapest
49.5		Glenn Davis (USA)	June 29, 1956	Los Angeles
49.2		Glenn Davis (USA)	August 6, 1958	Budapest
49.2		Salvatore Morale (ITA)	September 14, 1962	Belgrade
49.1		Rex Cawley (USA)	September 13, 1964	Los Angeles
48.8	48.94	Geoff Vanderstock (USA)	September 11, 1968	Echo Summit
48.1	48.12	David Hemery (GBR)	October 15, 1968	Mexico City
47.8	47.82	John Akii-Bua (UGA)	September 2, 1972	Munich

"y" denotes time for 440 yards (402.34 m) which was ratified as a world record in this event.

The "Time" column indicates the ratified mark; the "Auto" column indicates a fully automatic time that was also recorded in the event when hand-timed marks were used for official records, or which was the basis for the official mark, rounded to the 10th of a second, depending on the rules then in place.

== Progression post-1975 ==
Ratified
Not ratified
Ratified but later rescinded
Pending ratification

From 1975, the IAAF accepted separate automatically electronically timed records for events up to 400 metres. Starting January 1, 1977, the IAAF required fully automatic timing to the hundredth of a second for these events.

John Akii-Bua's 1972 Olympic gold medal run was the fastest recorded fully electronic 400 metre race to that time, at 47.82.

Time	Athlete	Date	Location
47.64	Edwin Moses (USA)	July 25, 1976	Montreal
47.45	Edwin Moses (USA)	June 11, 1977	Westwood, Los Angeles
47.13	Edwin Moses (USA)	July 3, 1980	Milan
47.02	Edwin Moses (USA)	August 31, 1983	Koblenz
46.78	Kevin Young (USA)	August 6, 1992	Barcelona
46.70	Karsten Warholm (NOR)	July 1, 2021	Oslo
45.94	Karsten Warholm (NOR)	August 3, 2021	Tokyo
45.80	Alison dos Santos (BRA)	August 27, 2026	Zurich

== See also ==
- Women's 400 metres hurdles world record progression
- Hurdling
