= Karin Roßley =

East German hurdler (born 1957)

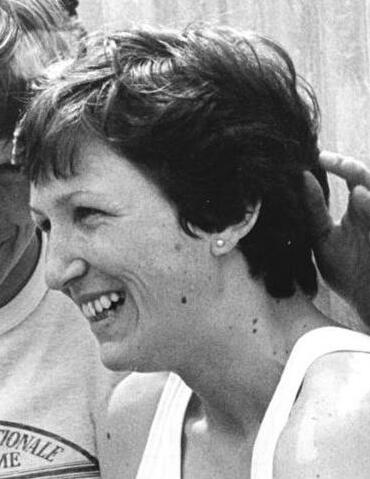
- Roßley in 1980

Medal record

Women's athletics

Representing East Germany

European Championships
Bronze medal – third place	1978 Prague	400 m hurdles

Karin Roßley, (née Regel, born 5 April 1957) is a retired East German hurdler, who represented the sports team SC Cottbus. She was born in Cottbus.

She won the bronze medal at the 1978 European Championships.

Roßley set two world records during her career: 55.63 seconds in August 1977 in Helsinki and 54.28 seconds in May 1980 in Jena. The latter stood for three years until Anna Ambrazienė ran in 54.02 seconds in Moscow. Karin Roßley's personal best time remained at was 54.28 seconds, a result which ranks her eighth among German 400 m hurdlers, behind Sabine Busch, Cornelia Ullrich, Ellen Fiedler, Heike Meissner, Gudrun Abt, Silvia Rieger and Susanne Losch.

Records
Preceded by (Soviet Union) Marina Makeyeva	Women's 400 m Hurdles World Record Holder; 17 May 1980 – 11 June 1983	Succeeded by (Soviet Union) Anna Ambrazienė
Sporting positions
Preceded by (Soviet Union) Marina Makeyeva	Women's 400 m Hurdles Best Year Performance; 1980	Succeeded by (East Germany) Ellen Fiedler
