= Gatchina constituency =

Russian legislative constituency

Gatchina single-member constituency
- Constituency of the Russian State Duma

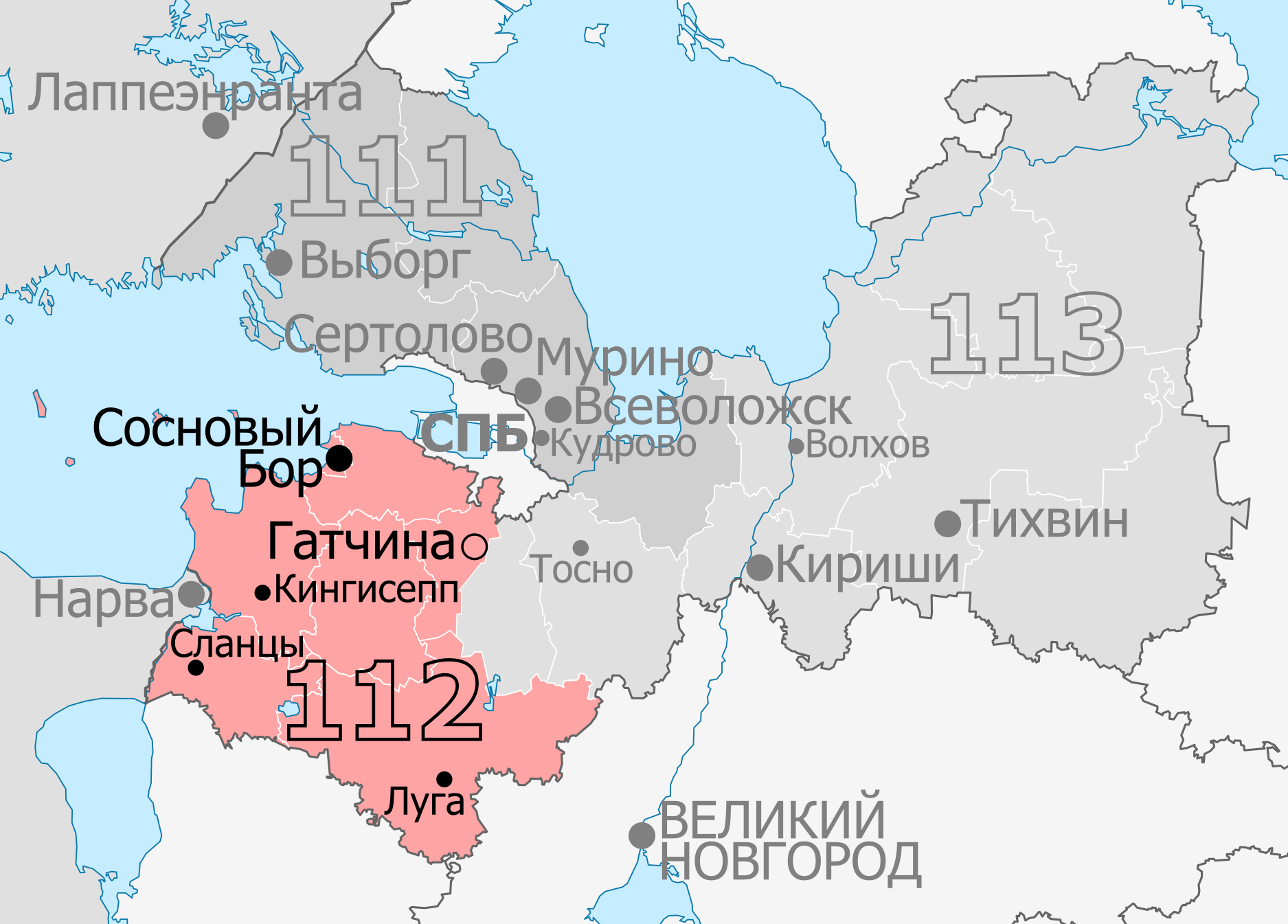
- Constituency boundaries from 2016 to 2026
- Deputy: Sergey Yakhnyuk; United Russia
- Federal subject: Leningrad Oblast
- Districts: Sosnovy Bor, Volosovsky, Gatchinsky, Kingiseppsky, Lomonosovsky, Luzhsky, Slantsevsky
- Voters: 460,886 (2026)

The Gatchina constituency (No.113 (Note: Kingisepp constituency No.100 in 1995-2003, Kingisepp constituency No.101 in 2003-2007, Kingisepp constituency No.112 in 2016–2026)) is a Russian legislative constituency in Leningrad Oblast. The constituency covers western Leningrad Oblast.

The constituency has been represented since 2017 by United Russia deputy Sergey Yakhnyuk, former Vice Governor of Leningrad Oblast, who won the open seat after the resignation of State Duma Chairman Sergey Naryshkin.

== Boundaries ==
1995–2007 Kingisepp constituency: Gatchina, Gatchinsky District (western part), Ivangorod, Kingisepp, Kingiseppsky District, Lomonosovsky District, Luzhsky District, Slantsevsky District, Sosnovy Bor, Volosovsky District
The constituency was created following the 1995 redistricting after Leningrad Oblast gained third district. The constituency covers western Leningrad Oblast, including the cities of Gatchina, Ivangorod, Kingisepp and Sosnovy Bor, and was created from both Volkhov (Gatchina and Luzhsky District) and Vsevolozhsk constituencies (the rest of the seat).

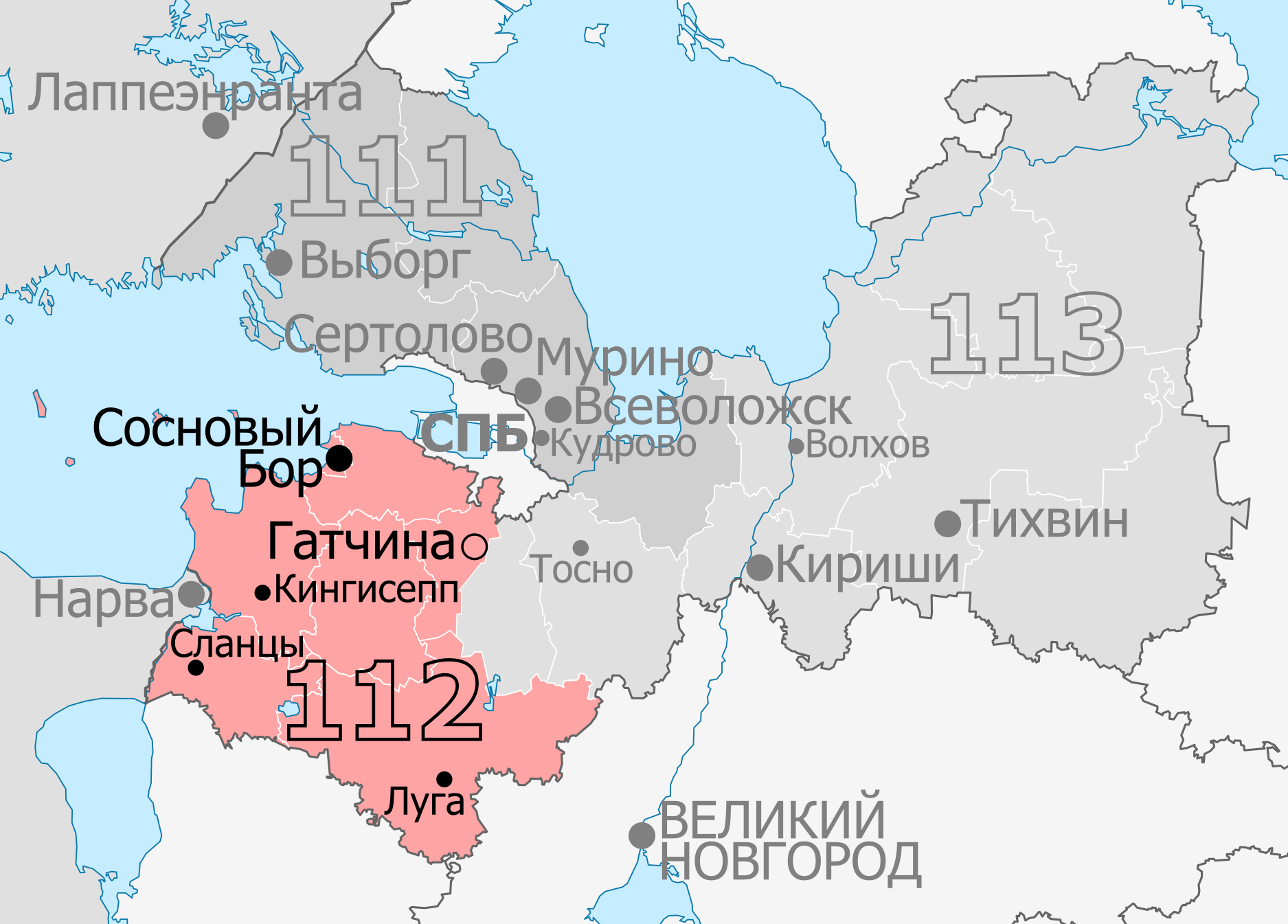
Constituency boundaries from 2016 to 2026

2016–2026 Kingisepp constituency: Gatchinsky District (Bolshy Kolpany, Gatchina, Maloye Verevo, Pudost, Rozhdestveno, Syaskelevo, Taytsy, Voyskovitsy, Yelizavetino), Kingiseppsky District, Lomonosovsky District, Luzhsky District, Slantsevsky District, Sosnovy Bor, Volosovsky District
The constituency was re-created for the 2016 election and retained all of its former territory.

2026–present: Gatchinsky District, Kingiseppsky District, Lomonosovsky District, Luzhsky District, Slantsevsky District, Sosnovy Bor, Volosovsky District
After the 2025 redistricting the constituency was slightly changed, gaining the rest of Gatchinsky District from Volkhov constituency. The constituency was also renamed "Gatchina constituency".

== Members elected ==
By-election are shown in italics.

Election	Member	Party
1995	Viktor Vorogushin	Independent
1999	Nikolay Botka	Unity
2003	Vitaly Yuzhilin	Rodina
2007	Proportional representation - no election by constituency	
2011	Proportional representation - no election by constituency	
2016	Sergey Naryshkin (Note: appointed as Director of Foreign Intelligence Service in October 2016)	United Russia
2017	Sergey Yakhnyuk	United Russia
2021	Sergey Yakhnyuk	United Russia
2026	Sergey Yakhnyuk	United Russia

== Election results ==
=== 1995 ===
Summary of the 17 December 1995 Russian legislative election in the Kingisepp constituency
Candidate	Party	Votes	%
Viktor Vorogushin	Independent	36,358	13.12%
Valery Kirpichnikov	Ivan Rybkin Bloc	32,510	11.74%
Vadim Gustov	Independent	30,470	11.00%
Rashid Ismagilov	Our Home – Russia	27,455	9.91%
Aleksandr Astakhov	Independent	19,739	7.13%
Aleksandr Stavitsky	Communists and Working Russia - for the Soviet Union	18,638	6.73%
Sergey Semenov	Yabloko	16,402	5.92%
Igor Yudchenko	Forward, Russia!	14,796	5.34%
Yevgeny Buzov	Liberal Democratic Party	13,410	4.84%
Vladimir Leonov	Independent	11,565	4.17%
Aleksandr Khudulainen	Union of Workers of ZhKKh	6,995	2.53%
Stepan Kolomeytsev	Trade Unions and Industrialists – Union of Labour	4,347	1.57%
Vladimir Michurin	Independent	1,002	0.36%
against all		36,806	13.29%
Total		277,023	100%

=== 1999 ===
Summary of the 19 December 1999 Russian legislative election in the Kingisepp constituency
Candidate	Party	Votes	%
Nikolay Botka	Unity	67,255	27.58%
Grigory Naginsky	Yabloko	32,383	13.28%
Viktor Vorogushin (incumbent)	Communist Party	32,039	13.14%
Zalina Medoyeva	Union of Right Forces	12,301	5.04%
Nikolay Khaustov	Fatherland – All Russia	11,740	4.81%
Sergey Marmylev	Independent	9,580	3.93%
Yury Belyayev	Independent	8,042	3.30%
Mikhail Glushchenko	Independent	7,075	2.90%
Aleksey Bondarenko	Liberal Democratic Party	5,262	2.16%
Vladimir Leonov	Stalin Bloc – For the USSR	4,541	1.86%
Lyudmila Pushkareva	Independent	4,122	1.69%
Vyacheslav Sivko	Our Home – Russia	3,420	1.40%
Boris Khodykin	Independent	2,738	1.12%
Leonid Polokhov	Congress of Russian Communities-Yury Boldyrev Movement	2,618	1.07%
Mikhail Korneyev	Independent	2,445	1.00%
Aleksandr Nadelyuyev	For Civil Dignity	2,081	0.85%
Vladimir Osipov	Russian Cause	1,798	0.74%
Anton Volkov	Independent	1,558	0.64%
Denis Kravchenko	Independent	851	0.35%
Kirill Ragozin	Independent	503	0.21%
against all		26,645	10.93%
Total		243,870	100%

=== 2003 ===
Summary of the 7 December 2003 Russian legislative election in the Kingisepp constituency
Candidate	Party	Votes	%
Vitaly Yuzhilin	Rodina	72,509	34.25%
Igor Dines	United Russia	36,604	17.29%
Viktor Vorogushin	Communist Party	16,720	7.90%
Sergey Pavlov	Independent	11,956	5.65%
Sergey Grachev	Yabloko	10,375	4.90%
Vsevolod Aziatskov	Liberal Democratic Party	8,032	3.79%
Boris Bogdanov	Independent	5,682	2.68%
Aleksandr Argunov	Great Russia–Eurasian Union	3,849	1.82%
Yury Belyayev	Independent	3,577	1.69%
Roman Stepanov	United Russian Party Rus'	3,135	1.48%
Yevgeny Antonenko	Independent	2,081	0.98%
against all		33,346	15.75%
Total		212,101	100%

=== 2016 ===
Summary of the 18 September 2016 Russian legislative election in the Kingisepp constituency
Candidate	Party	Votes	%
Sergey Naryshkin	United Russia	98,999	52.49%
Marina Lyubushkina	A Just Russia	22,823	12.10%
Nikolay Kuzmin	Communist Party	21,424	11.36%
Vyacheslav Dyubkov	Liberal Democratic Party	14,413	7.64%
Viktor Perov	Communists of Russia	6,894	3.66%
Aleksandr Senotrusov	Yabloko	5,329	2.83%
Anatoly Golosov	Rodina	3,755	1.99%
Dmitry Skurikhin	People's Freedom Party	3,194	1.69%
Armen Ananyan	The Greens	2,529	1.34%
Aleksandr Gabitov	Civic Platform	1,541	0.82%
Total		188,602	100%

=== 2017 ===
Summary of the 10 September 2017 Russian by-election in the Kingisepp constituency
Candidate	Party	Votes	%
Sergey Yakhnyuk	United Russia	61,420	61.58%
Nikolay Kuzmin	Communist Party	11,269	11.30%
Marina Lyubushkina	A Just Russia	6,942	6.96%
Natalya Kruglova	Liberal Democratic Party	5,198	5.21%
Andrey Shirokov	Party of Pensioners	3,714	3.72%
Sergey Gulyayev	Yabloko	3,138	3.15%
Konstantin Zhukov	Communists of Russia	3,040	3.05%
Valery Shinkarenko	Rodina	1,109	1.11%
Serik Urazov	Patriots of Russia	758	0.76%
Total		99,745	100%

=== 2021 ===
Summary of the 17-19 September 2021 Russian legislative election in the Kingisepp constituency
Candidate	Party	Votes	%
Sergey Yakhnyuk (incumbent)	United Russia	72,546	39.81%
Nikolay Kuzmin	Communist Party	38,999	21.40%
Nikita Belousov	Liberal Democratic Party	19,690	10.81%
Aleksandr Yarov	New People	15,497	8.50%
Vladislav Golikov	Party of Pensioners	13,773	7.56%
Igor Pastushenko	Rodina	5,498	3.02%
Leonid Parunov	Civic Platform	3,628	1.99%
Total		182,221	100%

=== 2026 ===
Summary of the 18-20 September 2026 Russian legislative election in the Gatchina constituency
Candidate	Party	Votes	%
Sergey Yakhnyuk (incumbent)	United Russia	154,288	54.81%
Nikita Belousov	Liberal Democratic Party	35,348	12.56%
Sergey Malinkovich	Communists of Russia	23,715	8.42%
Yevgeny Zhdanov	New People	21,122	7.50%
Semyon Sadriyev	A Just Russia	15,753	5.60%
Viktoria Razina	Yabloko	14,483	5.15%
Sergey Lisovsky	The Greens	8,102	2.88%
Total		281,496	100%
