= Silvia Hollmann =

German hurdler

Medal record

Women's athletics

Representing West Germany

European Championships
| Silver medal – second place | 1978 Prague | 400 m hurdles |

European Indoor Championships
| Silver medal – second place | 1975 Katowice | 4×320 m |

Silvia Hollmann-Schieck (née Hollmann; born 13 May 1955 in Menden (Sauerland), North Rhine-Westphalia) is a retired West German hurdler.

At the 1978 European Championships she won the silver medal in 400 m hurdles and finished fifth in 4 × 400 m relay. She also competed at the 1976 Summer Olympics.
