= Tatyana Storozheva =

Soviet Athlete (born 1954)

Personal information
- Born: March 22, 1954
- Height: 1.63 m (5 ft 4 in)
- Weight: 62 kg (137 lb)

Sport
- Sport: Running
- Event: 400 meters hurdles

Tatyana Storozheva
Medal record

Women's Athletics

1979 Spatakiad
| Silver medal – second place | 1979 Spartakiad | 400 metres hurdles |

1975 Spatakiad
| Bronze medal – third place | 1975 Spartakiad | 4x400 metres relay |

Tatyana Storozheva (born March 22, 1954) was a Soviet hurdler who held the world record in the 400m hurdles.

== Career ==
Storozheva achieved the women's world record for 400m hurdles on 26 June 1977 with a time of 55.74s.

Storozheva also won medals in the Soviet Union's Spartakiad:

- Silver in the 400m Hurdles in 1979
- Bronze in the 4 × 400 m relay in 1975.

Storozheva also won gold in the 400m hurdles in the 1977 edition of the USA–USSR Track and Field Dual Meet Series.
