= Volkhov constituency =

Russian legislative constituency

Volkhov single-member constituency
- Constituency of the Russian State Duma
- Deputy: Sergey Petrov; United Russia
- Federal subject: Leningrad Oblast
- Districts: Boksitogorsky, Kirishsky, Kirovsky, Lodeynopolsky, Podporozhsky, Tikhvinsky, Tosnensky, Volkhovsky, Vsevolozhsky (Imeni Sverdlova, Yanino-1)
- Voters: 476,935 (2026)

The Volkhov constituency (No.114 (Note: No.100 in 1993-1995, No.98 in 1995-2003, No.99 in 2003-2007, No.113 in 2016–2026)) is a Russian legislative constituency in Leningrad Oblast. The constituency covers most of eastern Leningrad Oblast.

The constituency has been represented since 2016 by United Russia deputy Sergey Petrov, five-term State Duma member and billionaire construction businessman.

== Boundaries ==
1993–1995: Boksitogorsky District, Gatchina, Gatchinsky District, Kirishsky District, Kirovsky District, Lodeynopolsky District, Pikalyovo, Podporozhsky District, Shlisselburg, Tikhvinsky District, Tosnensky District, Volkhov, Volkhovsky District
The constituency covered most of eastern Leningrad Oblast, including Saint Petersburg southern suburbs and the cities of Gatchina, Pikalyovo, Shlisselburg, Volkhov.

1995–2007: Boksitogorsky District, Gatchinsky District (eastern part), Kirishsky District, Kommunar, Lodeynopolsky District, Novaya Ladoga, Pikalyovo, Podporozhsky District, Tikhvinsky District, Tosnensky District, Volkhov, Volkhovsky District
The constituency was heavily altered following the 1995 redistricting as Leningrad Oblast gained a third district. This seat lost western part of Gatchinsky District, including Gatchina, to new Kingisepp constituency as well as Kirovsky District to Vsevolozhsk constituency.

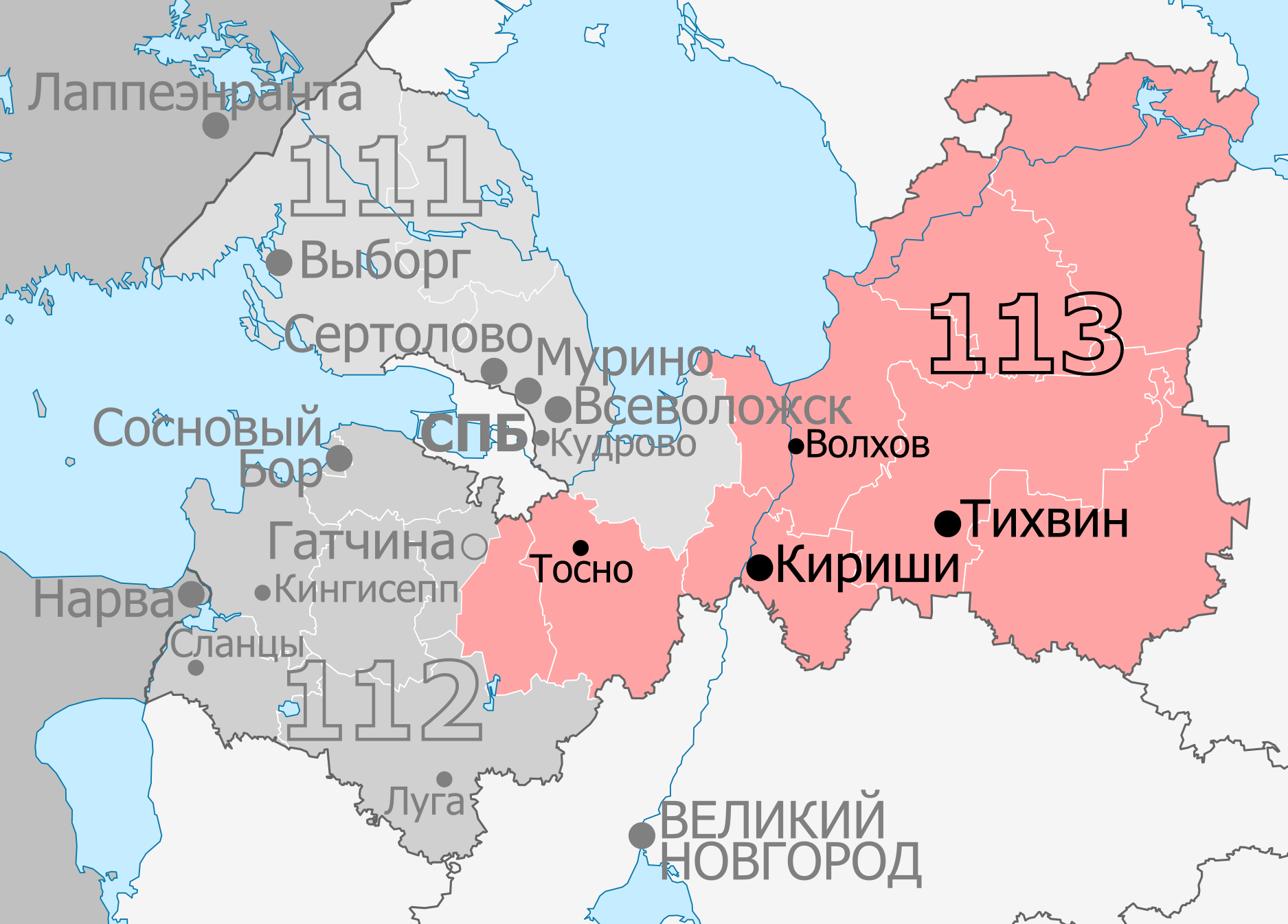
Constituency boundaries from 2016 to 2026

2016–2026: Boksitogorsky District, Gatchinsky District (Druzhnaya Gorka, Kobrinskye, Kommunar, Novosvetskoye, Pudomyagskoye, Siversky, Susaninskoye, Vyritsa), Kirishsky District, Lodeynopolsky District, Podporozhsky District, Tikhvinsky District, Tosnensky District, Volkhovsky District
The constituency was re-created for the 2016 election and retained all of its former territory.

2026–present: Boksitogorsky District, Kirishsky District, Kirovsky District, Lodeynopolsky District, Podporozhsky District, Tikhvinsky District, Tosnensky District, Volkhovsky District, Vsevolozhsky District (Imeni Sverdlova, Yanino-1)
After the 2025 redistricting the constituency was significantly changed, losing the rest of Gatchinsky District to Kingisepp constituency. This seat instead was pushed to eastern suburbs of Saint Petersburg, gaining Kirovsky District and a small portion of Vsevolozhsky District (including the megasuburb Kudrovo) from Vsevolozhsk constituency.

== Members elected ==
Election	Member	Party
1993	Yury Sokolov	Independent
1995	Yury Belov	Communist Party
1999	Aleksandr Shimanov	Party of Pensioners
2003	Aleksandr Shimanov	United Russia
2007	Proportional representation - no election by constituency	
2011	Proportional representation - no election by constituency	
2016	Sergey Petrov	United Russia
2021	Sergey Petrov	United Russia
2026	Sergey Petrov	United Russia

== Election results ==
=== 1993 ===
Summary of the 12 December 1993 Russian legislative election in the Volkhov constituency
Candidate	Party	Votes	%
Yury Sokolov	Independent	81,495	23.44%
Nonna Volchkova	Independent	72,471	20.85%
Sergey Modestov	Independent	67,378	19.38%
Zalina Medoyeva	Choice of Russia	33,589	9.66%
against all		63,859	18.37%
Total		347,666	100%

=== 1995 ===
Summary of the 17 December 1995 Russian legislative election in the Volkhov constituency
Candidate	Party	Votes	%
Yury Belov	Communist Party	71,527	25.37%
Yury Sokolov (incumbent)	Independent	44,793	15.89%
Sergey Modestov	Our Home – Russia	41,383	14.68%
Boris Yakovlev	Kedr	34,210	12.14%
Andrey Markushev	Communists and Working Russia - for the Soviet Union	19,049	6.76%
Yury Mishin	Congress of Russian Communities	13,030	4.62%
Gennady Ravdis	Liberal Democratic Party	11,730	4.16%
Yevgeny Tsvetkov	Independent	7,164	2.54%
against all		33,019	11.71%
Total		281,883	100%

=== 1999 ===
Summary of the 19 December 1999 Russian legislative election in the Volkhov constituency
Candidate	Party	Votes	%
Aleksandr Shimanov	Party of Pensioners	60,029	24.19%
Aleksandr Belyakov	Unity	38,956	15.70%
Yury Sevenard	Communist Party	38,252	15.41%
Anatoly Zaytsev	Fatherland – All Russia	28,637	11.54%
Sergey Petrov	Independent	19,256	7.76%
Igor Afanasyev	Independent	12,016	4.84%
Vyacheslav Skvortsov	Our Home – Russia	8,911	3.59%
Viktor Yashin	Liberal Democratic Party	5,549	2.24%
Dmitry Mayatsky	Independent	898	0.36%
against all		31,362	12.64%
Total		248,179	100%

=== 2003 ===
Summary of the 7 December 2003 Russian legislative election in the Volkhov constituency
Candidate	Party	Votes	%
Aleksandr Shimanov (incumbent)	United Russia	64,772	31.27%
Andrey Siletsky	Independent	50,689	24.47%
Mikhail Vodopyanov	People's Party	22,182	10.71%
Nikolay Kucherov	Independent	13,679	6.60%
Valery Grigoryev	Liberal Democratic Party	10,647	5.14%
Oleg Matveyev	Yabloko	7,250	3.50%
Aleksandr Lupeko	Union of Right Forces	3,792	1.83%
against all		30,237	14.60%
Total		207,194	100%

=== 2016 ===
Summary of the 18 September 2016 Russian legislative election in the Volkhov constituency
Candidate	Party	Votes	%
Sergey Petrov	United Russia	84,066	46.82%
Galina Kulikova	A Just Russia	26,078	14.52%
Vladimir Ozherelyev	Communist Party	15,778	8.79%
Aleksey Ponimatkin	Liberal Democratic Party	13,598	7.57%
Andrey Gindos	Communists of Russia	6,702	3.73%
Maksim Volkov	Party of Growth	6,234	3.47%
Vladimir Mayorov	Civic Platform	4,370	2.43%
Aleksandr Rastorguyev	People's Freedom Party	3,431	1.91%
Svetlana Stosha	Yabloko	3,366	1.87%
Valery Shinkarenko	Rodina	3,292	1.83%
Yelena Morozenok	The Greens	2,992	1.67%
Total		179,564	100%

=== 2021 ===
Summary of the 17-19 September 2021 Russian legislative election in the Volkhov constituency
Candidate	Party	Votes	%
Sergey Petrov (incumbent)	United Russia	74,467	40.85%
Aleksandr Perminov	A Just Russia — For Truth	24,895	13.66%
Vladimir Ozherelyev	Communist Party	20,285	11.13%
Olga Baranova	Party of Pensioners	18,181	9.97%
Andrey Gindos	Communists of Russia	12,156	6.67%
Vyacheslav Dyubkov	Liberal Democratic Party	9,915	5.44%
Sergey Tikhomirov	Civic Platform	4,253	2.33%
Sergey Furs	Yabloko	3,850	2.11%
Dmitry Zhvaniya	Rodina	3,271	1.79%
Total		182,301	100%

=== 2026 ===
Summary of the 18-20 September 2026 Russian legislative election in the Volkhov constituency
Candidate	Party	Votes	%
Sergey Petrov (incumbent)	United Russia	187,582	60.81%
Igor Rikhtikov	Liberal Democratic Party	22,801	7.39%
Vladislav Mironenkov	New People	20,449	6.63%
Yevgeny Tiron	Communist Party	18,277	5.92%
Veronika Katorgina	A Just Russia	16,880	5.47%
Aleksandr Sakharov	Communists of Russia	14,194	4.60%
Anton Kostik	Yabloko	13,016	4.22%
Konstantin Gribach	The Greens	7,568	2.45%
Total		308,496	100%
