= Imeni Sverdlova, Kazakhstan =

Imeni Sverdlova
- Village
- Location in Kazakhstan
- Coordinates: 43°29′23″N 77°03′08″E
- Country: Kazakhstan
- Region: Almaty Region
- Time zone: UTC+6 (Omsk Time)

Imeni Sverdlova is a village in Almaty Region, in south-eastern Kazakhstan.
