= 400 metres hurdles =

Track and field hurdling event

Athletics 400 metres hurdles
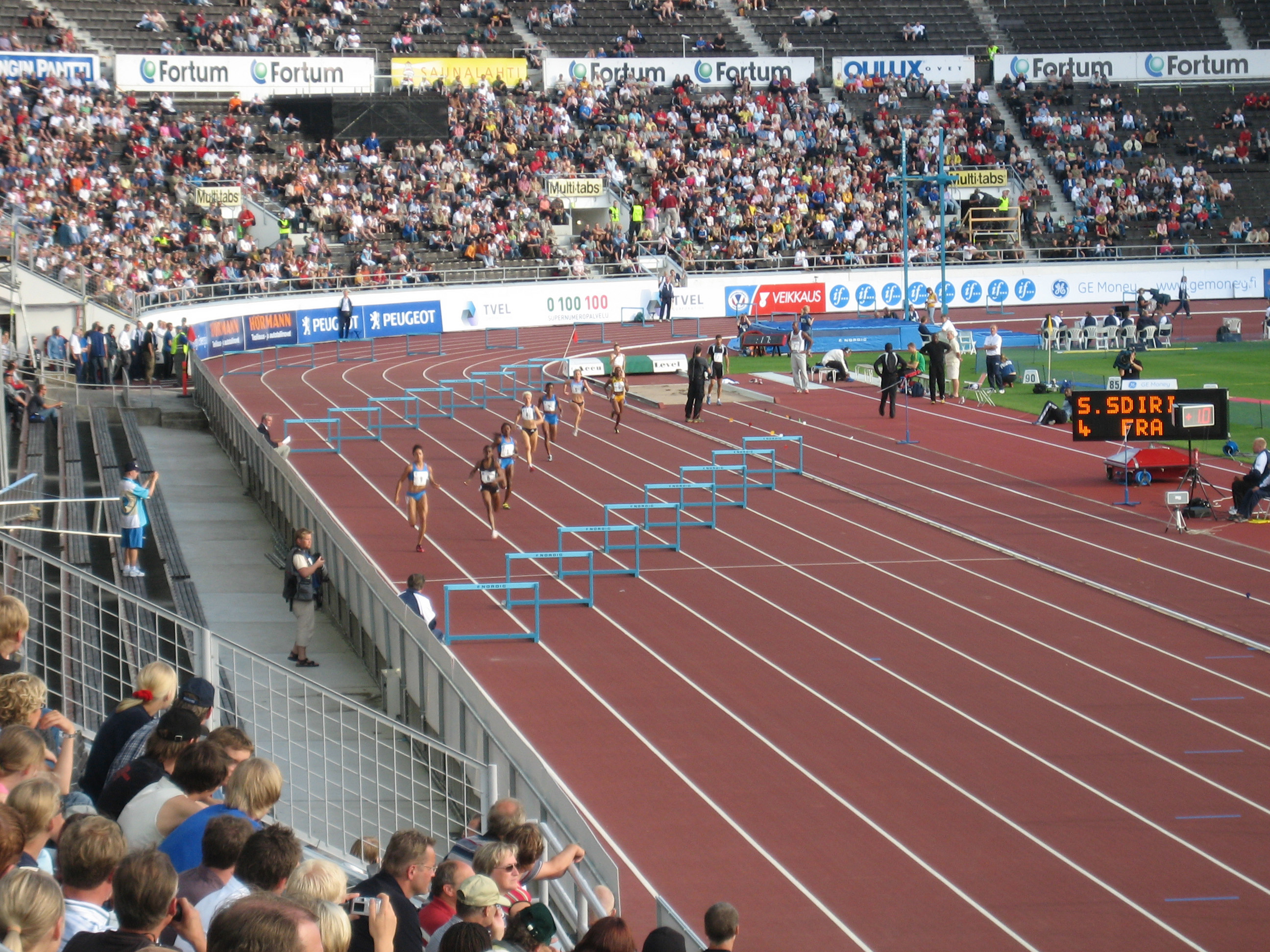
- Women's 400m hurdles at the 2005 GE Money Grand Prix in Helsinki, Finland

World records
- Men: (Brazil) Alison dos Santos 45.80 (2026)
- Women: (United States) Sydney McLaughlin-Levrone 50.37 (2024)

Olympic records
- Men: (Norway) Karsten Warholm 45.94 (2021)
- Women: (United States) Sydney McLaughlin-Levrone 50.37 (2024)

World Championship records
- Men: (Brazil) Alison dos Santos 46.29 (2022)
- Women: (United States) Sydney McLaughlin-Levrone 50.68 (2022)

The 400 metres hurdles is a hurdling event in track and field. The event has been on the Olympic athletics programme since 1900 for men and since 1984 for women.

On a standard outdoor track, 400 metres is the length of the inside lane, once around the stadium. Runners stay in their lanes the entire way after starting out of the blocks and must clear ten hurdles that are evenly spaced around the track. The hurdles are positioned and weighted so that they fall forward if bumped into with sufficient force, to prevent injury to the runners. Although there is no longer any penalty for knocking hurdles over, runners prefer to clear them cleanly, as touching them during the race slows runners down.

The current men's and women's world record holders are Alison dos Santos with 45.80 seconds and Sydney McLaughlin-Levrone with 50.37 seconds. Compared to the 400 metres run, the hurdles race takes the men about three seconds longer and the women four seconds longer. Men clear hurdles that are 91.4 centimetres (36 in) high, while women negotiate 76.2 centimetres (30 in) barriers.

The 400 m hurdles was held for both sexes at the inaugural IAAF World Championships in Athletics. The first championship for women came at the 1980 World Championships in Athletics – being held as a one-off due to the lack of a race at the 1980 Summer Olympics.

== History ==
The first awards in a men's 400 m hurdles race were given in 1860 when a race was held in Oxford, England, over a course of 440 yards (402.336 m). While running the course, participants had to clear twelve wooden hurdles, over 100 centimetres tall, that had been spaced in even intervals.

To reduce the risk of injury, somewhat more lightweight constructions were introduced in 1895 that runners could push over. However, until 1935 runners were disqualified if they pushed over more than three hurdles in a race and records were only officially accepted if the runner in question had cleared all hurdles clean and left them all standing.

The 400 m hurdles became an Olympic event at the 1900 Summer Olympics in Paris, France. At the same time, the race was standardized; thus, virtually identical races could be held and the finish times compared to one other. As a result, the official distance was fixed to 400 metres, or one lap of the stadium, and the number of hurdles was reduced to ten. The official height of the hurdles was set to 91.4 centimetres (36 in). The hurdles are now placed on the course with a run-up to the first hurdle of 45 metres, distance between the hurdles of 35 metres each, and home stretch from the last hurdle to finish line of 40 metres.

The first documented 400 m hurdles race for women took place in 1971. In 1974, the International Amateur Athletics Federation (IAAF), now known as World Athletics, introduced the event officially as a discipline, with hurdles at the lower height of 76.2 centimetres (30 in). The women's race was not run at the Olympics until the 1984 Summer Games in Los Angeles where it was first staged with the first Men's World Champion having been crowned the year before at the inaugural World Athletics Championships. A special edition of the Women's 400m Hurdles took place in the 1980 IAAF World Championships in Athletics in response to the Women's 400m Hurdles not being included at the boycotted 1980 Summer Olympics in Moscow, and Liberty Bell Classic.

Many athletic commentators and officials have often brought up the idea of lifting the height of the women's 400 m hurdles to incorporate a greater requirement of hurdling skill. This is a view held by German athletic coach Norbert Stein, "All this means that the women's hurdles for specialists, who are the target group to be dealt with in this discussion, is considerably depreciated in skill demands when compared to the men's hurdles. It should not be possible in the women's hurdles that the winner is an athlete whose performance in the flat sprint is demonstrably excellent but whose technique of hurdling is only moderate and whose anthropometric characteristics are not optimal. This was the case at the World Championships in Seville and the same problem can often be seen at international and national meetings."

== Hurdling technique ==
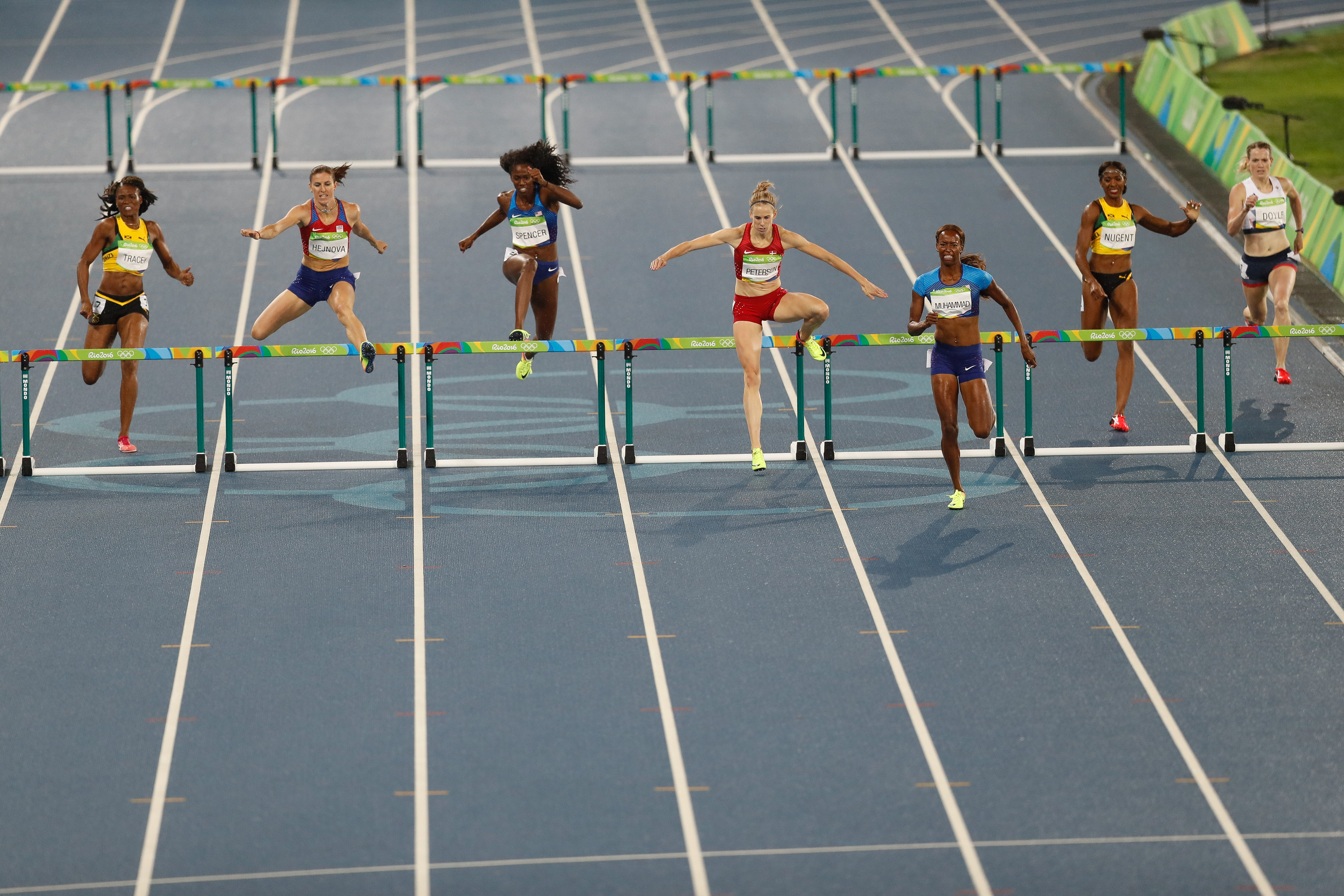
Home straight during a women's final at the 2016 Summer Olympics

In terms of technique and endurance, the 400-metre hurdles is arguably the most demanding event in the sprints and hurdles group. Athletes must be able to run a fast 400-metre flat time, maintain a good hurdling technique, and have an awareness of stride pattern between hurdles. The ideal time difference between an athlete's 400 time and their 400 hurdles time should be between 1.5 and 3 seconds. This variation depends on the specific attributes of the athlete: In adult races, the women's hurdles are lower (76.2 cm) than the men's (91.4 cm) which usually makes the average time difference smaller for female athletes. In 2024, the two fastest 400 hurdlers in the world (Sydney McLaughlin-Levrone and Femke Bol) were also two of the fastest women in the flat 400. To be able to maintain a good hurdling technique throughout the race it is important to work on step patterns. Most 400 hurdlers know how many steps they are going to take in between each hurdle. The distance between the start and the first hurdle is 45 meters, which allows the fastest women to take 21 to 23 steps, while the fastest men can get down to 19 or 20. After the first one, the hurdles are 35 meters apart, and the tenth one is placed at 40 meters from the finish line. The steps taken between hurdles varies depending on the athlete's abilities, speed, technique, and personal preferences. The most skilled athletes can change their rhythm depending on how fast they need, or want, to run. For example, Karsten Warholm ran 13 steps up to hurdle seven, then decided to switch to 15 steps for the last three hurdles at the Paris Olympics, because he is more comfortable going over hurdles with his dominant leg. An even number of steps in between the hurdles implies alternating which leg goes over it first (lead leg), while an odd number of steps allows for going over the hurdles with the same leg. Furthermore, athletes must possess anaerobic endurance over the final 150 to 100 metres of the race as, at this point, lactate (the conjugate base of lactic acid) will accumulate in the body from anaerobic glycolysis.

=== Block start ===
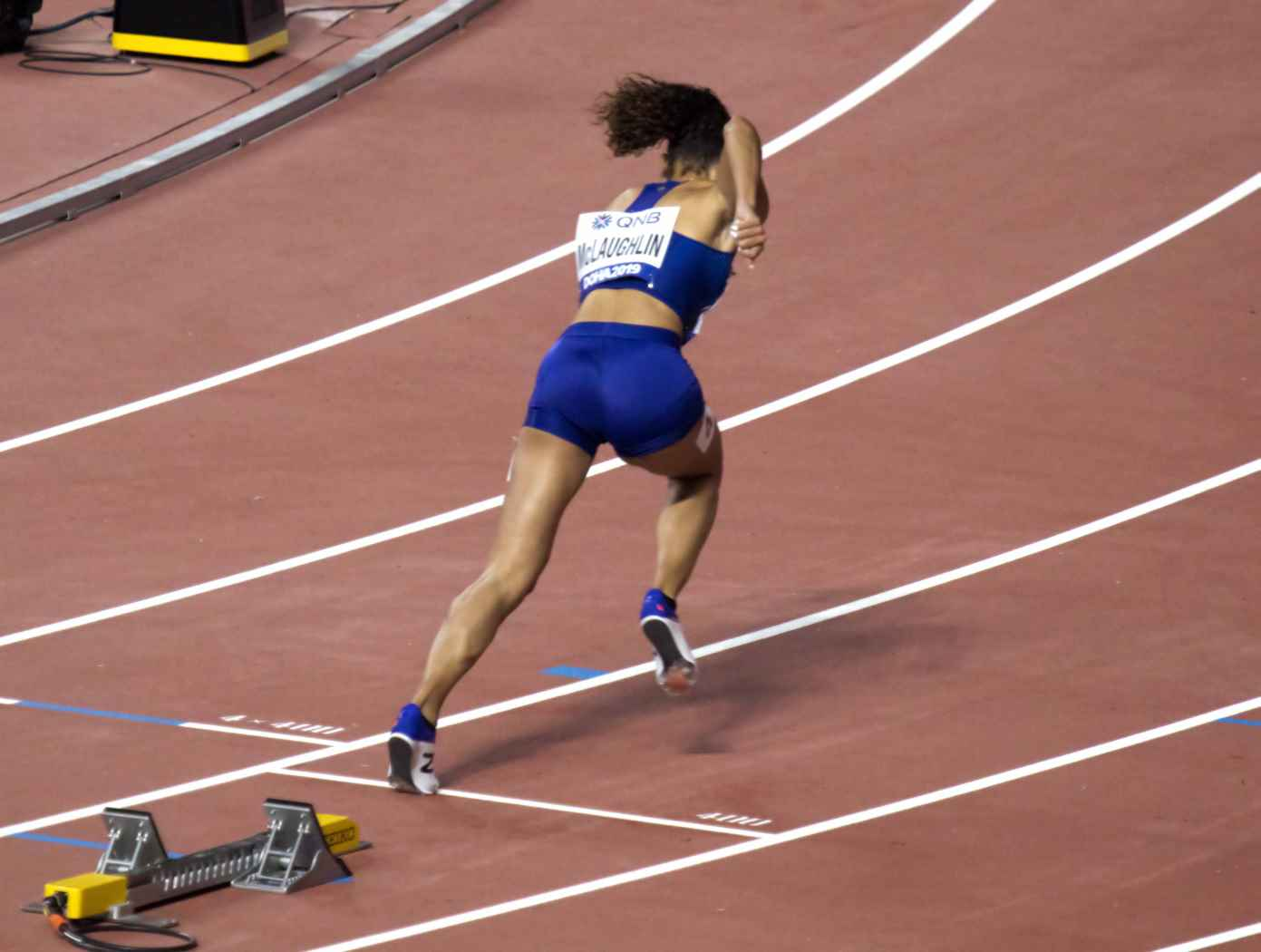
Sydney McLaughlin right after her block start in 2019

When preparing to hurdle, the blocks should be set so that the athlete arrives at the first hurdle leading on the desired leg without inserting a stutter step. A stutter step is when the runner has to chop their stride down to arrive on the "correct" leg for take off. Throughout the race, any adjustments to stride length stride speed should be made several strides out from the hurdle because a stutter or being too far from the hurdle at takeoff will result in loss of momentum and speed.

=== Hurdling ===
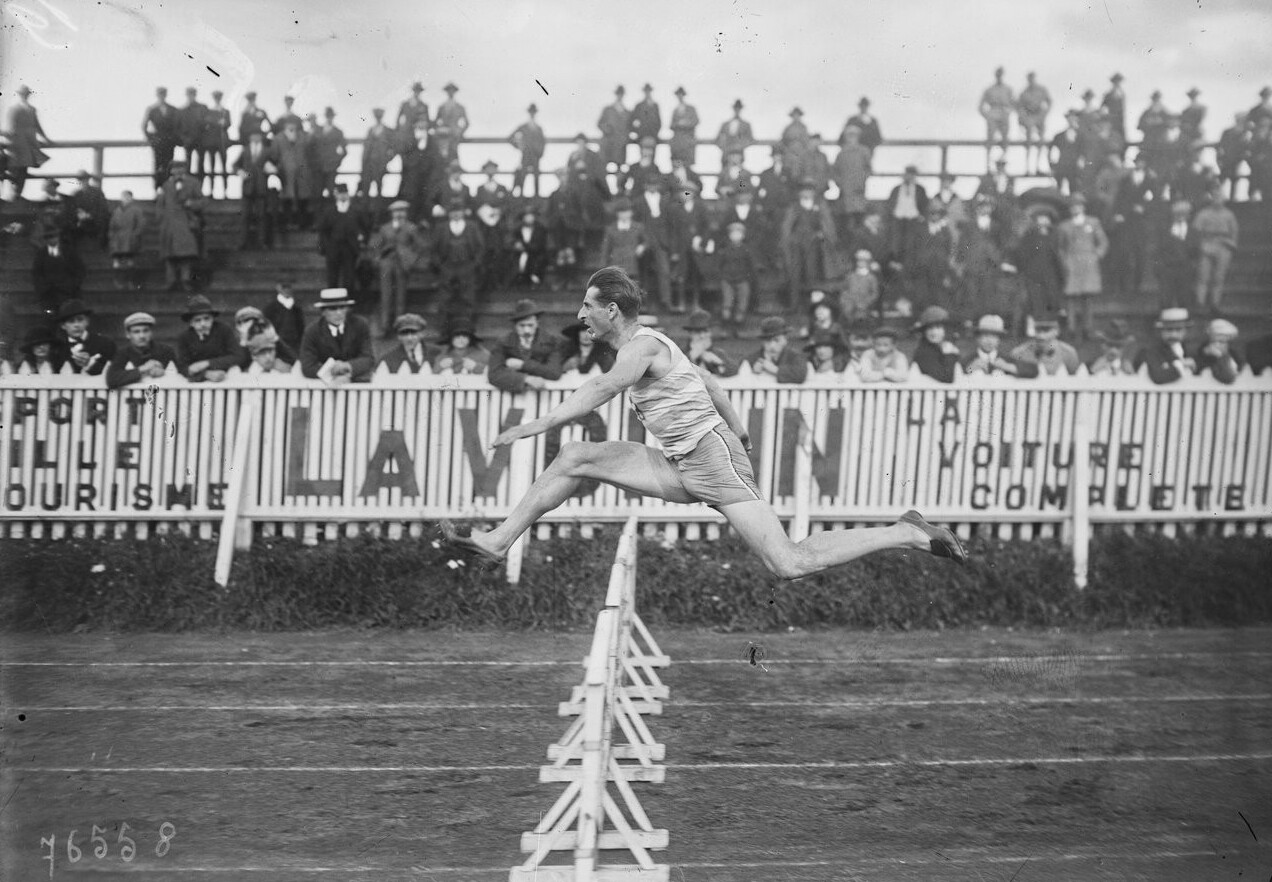
Géo André jumps over a barrier during the 400 metres hurdles in 1922.

At the beginning of the take-off, the knee must be driven toward the hurdle and the foot then extended. The leg position when extended must be stretched out, in a position of a split. The knee should be slightly bent when crossing the hurdle. Unless an athlete's body has great flexibility, the knee must be slightly bent to allow a forward body lean. Unlike the 110m hurdles, a significant forward body lean is not that necessary due to the hurdles being lower. However, the trail leg must be kept bent and short to provide a quick lever action allowing a fast hurdle clearance. The knee should pull through under the armpit and should not be flat across the top of the hurdle.

It is also important that the hurdler does not reach out on the last stride before the hurdle as this will result in a longer bound being made to clear the hurdle. This will also result in a loss of momentum if the foot lands well in front of the center of gravity.

=== Stride length ===
Using a left lead leg on the bends allows the hurdler to run closer to the inside of the lane and cover a shorter distance. Additionally, if the left leg is used for the lead, then the athlete's upper body can be leaned to the left, making it easier to bring the trail leg through. Additionally, an athlete hurdling with a right leg lead around the bends must take care that they do not inadvertently trail their foot or toe around the hurdle rather than passing over the top, which would lead to a disqualification from the race. Depending on the height and strength of the athlete, men work toward a stride pattern of 13 to 15 steps between each hurdle, and women work toward a stride pattern of 15 to 17. This does not include the landing step from the previous hurdle. Edwin Moses was the first man to keep 13 strides throughout an entire race. Weaker athletes will typically hold a longer step pattern throughout the race so that they do not bound or reach with each step, which also results in a loss of speed. These patterns are ideal because it allows the hurdler to take off from their predominant leg throughout the race without switching legs. However, fatigue from the race will knock athletes off their stride pattern and force them to switch legs. At an early age, many coaches train their athletes to hurdle with both legs. This is a useful skill to learn, since, as a runner tires, their stride length may decrease, resulting in the need either to add a stutter stride, or to take a hurdle on the other leg. Even though some athletes prefer using their dominant leg as lead, every professional knows how to go over hurdles with both legs. Some athletes have started choosing an even rhythm (Sydney McLaughlin-Levrone does 14 steps for most of her race).

== Area records ==
- Updated 27 August 2026.

Area	Men			Women		
Area	Time (s)	Season	Athlete	Time (s)	Season	Athlete
World	45.80	2026	Alison dos Santos (BRA)	50.37	2024	Sydney McLaughlin-Levrone (USA)
Area records
Africa (records)	47.10	1991	Samuel Matete (ZAM)	52.90	1999	Nezha Bidouane (MAR)
Asia (records)	46.98	2018	Abderrahman Samba (QAT)	53.09	2023	Kemi Adekoya (BHR)
Europe (records)	45.94	2021	Karsten Warholm (NOR)	50.95	2024	Femke Bol (NED)
North, Central America and Caribbean (records)	46.17	2021	Rai Benjamin (USA)	50.37	2024	Sydney McLaughlin-Levrone (USA)
Oceania (records)	48.28	1996	Rohan Robinson (AUS)	53.17	1988	Debbie Flintoff-King (AUS)
South America (records)	45.80	2026	Alison dos Santos (BRA)	52.66	2025	Gianna Woodruff (PAN)

== All-time top 25 ==
Tables show data for two definitions of "Top 25" - the top 25 400m hurdles times and the top 25 athletes:
- denotes top performance for athletes in the top 25 400m hurdles times
- denotes lesser performances, still in the top 25 400m hurdles times, by repeat athletes
- denotes top performance (only) for other top 25 athletes who fall outside the top 25 400m hurdles times

=== Men ===
- Correct as of September 2026.

All-time top 25 of the men's 400 metres hurdles
Ath.#	Perf.#	Time (s)	Athlete	Nation	Date	Place	Ref.
1	1	45.80	Alison dos Santos	Brazil	27 August 2026	Zurich	
2	2	45.94	Karsten Warholm	Norway	3 August 2021	Tokyo	
	3	45.98	dos Santos #2		13 September 2026	Budapest	
3	4	46.17	Rai Benjamin	United States	3 August 2021	Tokyo	
	5	46.28	Warholm #2		16 August 2025	Chorzów	
	6	46.29	dos Santos #3		19 July 2022	Eugene	
	7	46.39	Benjamin #2		16 September 2023	Eugene	
	8	46.40	Benjamin #3		13 September 2026	Budapest	
	9	46.43	dos Santos #4		23 August 2026	Chorzów	
	10	46.46	Benjamin #4		30 June 2024	Eugene	
	10	46.46	Benjamin #5		9 August 2024	Saint-Denis	
	12	46.48	dos Santos #5		26 July 2026	São Paulo	
	13	46.51	Warholm #3		21 July 2023	Monaco	
	14	46.52	Warholm #4		15 June 2023	Oslo	
	14	46.52	Benjamin #6		19 September 2025	Tokyo	
	16	46.53	Warholm #5		16 September 2023	Eugene	
	16	46.53	Warholm #6		23 August 2026	Chorzów	
	18	46.54	Benjamin #7		15 June 2025	Stockholm	
	19	46.61	Warholm #7		18 July 2026	London	
	20	46.62	Benjamin #8		9 July 2023	Eugene	
	21	46.63	dos Santos #6		30 May 2024	Oslo	
	21	46.63	Warholm #8		14 August 2026	Birmingham	
	23	46.64	Benjamin #9		18 May 2024	Los Angeles	
	24	46.65	dos Santos #7		5 July 2025	Eugene	
	25	46.67	Benjamin #10		12 July 2024	Monaco	
	25	46.67	Benjamin #11		21 August 2026	Lausanne	
4		46.78	Kevin Young	United States	6 August 1992	Barcelona	
5		46.98	Abderrahman Samba	Qatar	30 June 2018	Paris	
6		47.02	Edwin Moses	United States	31 August 1983	Koblenz	
7		47.03	Bryan Bronson	United States	21 June 1998	New Orleans	
8		47.08	Kyron McMaster	British Virgin Islands	3 August 2021	Tokyo	
9		47.10	Samuel Matete	Zambia	7 August 1991	Zurich	
9		47.10	Emil Agyekum	Germany	13 September 2026	Budapest	
11		47.11	Ezekiel Nathaniel	Nigeria	19 September 2025	Tokyo	
12		47.19	Andre Phillips	United States	25 September 1988	Seoul	
13		47.23	Amadou Dia Ba	Senegal	25 September 1988	Seoul	
13		47.23	Caleb Dean	United States	7 June 2024	Eugene	
15		47.24	Kerron Clement	United States	26 June 2005	Carson	
16		47.25	Félix Sánchez	Dominican Republic	29 August 2003	Saint-Denis	
16		47.25	Angelo Taylor	United States	18 August 2008	Beijing	
18		47.26	Matheus Lima	Brazil	23 August 2026	Chorzów	
19		47.30	Bershawn Jackson	United States	9 August 2005	Helsinki	
20		47.34	Roshawn Clarke	Jamaica	21 August 2023	Budapest	
21		47.37	Stéphane Diagana	France	5 July 1995	Lausanne	
21		47.37	Trevor Bassitt	United States	6 June 2026	College Station	
23		47.38	Danny Harris	United States	10 July 1991	Lausanne	
24		47.41	Wilfried Happio	France	19 July 2022	Eugene	
25		47.42	Malik James-King	Jamaica	28 June 2024	Kingston	
25		47.42	Clement Ducos	France	25 August 2024	Chorzów	

=== Women ===
- Correct as of August 2026.

All-time top 25 of the women's 400 metres hurdles
Ath.#	Perf.#	Time (s)	Athlete	Nation	Date	Place	Ref.
1	1	50.37	Sydney McLaughlin-Levrone	United States	8 August 2024	Saint-Denis	
	2	50.65	McLaughlin-Levrone #2		30 June 2024	Eugene	
	3	50.68	McLaughlin-Levrone #3		22 July 2022	Eugene	
2	4	50.95	Femke Bol	Netherlands	14 July 2024	La Chaux-de-Fonds	
	5	51.30	Bol #2		20 July 2024	London	
	6	51.41	McLaughlin-Levrone #4		25 June 2022	Eugene	
	7	51.45	Bol #3		23 July 2023	London	
	8	51.46	McLaughlin-Levrone #5		4 August 2021	Tokyo	
	9	51.54	Bol #4		19 September 2025	Tokyo	
3	10	51.58	Dalilah Muhammad	United States	4 August 2021	Tokyo	
	11	51.61	McLaughlin-Levrone #6		5 June 2022	Nashville	
	12	51.68	McLaughlin-Levrone #7		8 August 2022	Székesfehérvár	
	13	51.70	Bol #5		24 August 2023	Budapest	
4	14	51.87	Anna Cockrell	United States	8 August 2024	Saint-Denis	
	15	51.90	McLaughlin-Levrone #8		27 June 2021	Eugene	
	16	51.91	Bol #6		16 August 2025	Chorzów	
	17	51.95	Bol #7		11 July 2025	Monaco	
	18	51.98	Bol #8		17 September 2023	Eugene	
	19	52.03	Bol #9		4 August 2021	Tokyo	
	20	52.07	McLaughlin-Levrone #9		3 May 2025	Miramar	
5	21	52.08	Jasmine Jones	United States	19 September 2025	Tokyo	
	22	52.10	Bol #10		19 July 2025	London	
	23	52.11	Bol #11		8 September 2023	Brussels	
	23	52.11	Bol #12		15 June 2025	Stockholm	
	25	52.13	McLaughlin-Levrone #10		6 August 2024	Saint-Denis	
	25	52.13	Bol #13		25 August 2024	Chorzów	
	25	52.13	Cockrell #2		27 August 2026	Zurich	
6		52.30	Emma Zapletalová	Slovakia	19 June 2026	Doha	
7		52.34	Yuliya Pechonkina	Russia	8 August 2003	Tula	
8		52.39	Shamier Little	United States	4 July 2021	Stockholm	
9		52.42	Melaine Walker	Jamaica	20 August 2009	Berlin	
10		52.46	Savannah Sutherland	Canada	14 June 2025	Eugene	
11		52.47	Lashinda Demus	United States	1 September 2011	Daegu	
12		52.51	Rushell Clayton	Jamaica	28 June 2024	Kingston	
13		52.61	Kim Batten	United States	11 August 1995	Gothenburg	
14		52.62	Tonja Buford-Bailey	United States	11 August 1995	Gothenburg	
15		52.66	Gianna Woodruff	Panama	17 September 2025	Tokyo	
16		52.74	Sally Gunnell	Great Britain	19 August 1993	Stuttgart	
17		52.77	Fani Halkia	Greece	22 August 2004	Athens	
18		52.79	Sandra Farmer-Patrick	United States	19 August 1993	Stuttgart	
18		52.79	Kaliese Spencer	Jamaica	5 August 2011	London	
20		52.82	Deon Hemmings	Jamaica	31 July 1996	Atlanta	
21		52.83	Zuzana Hejnová	Czech Republic	15 August 2013	Moscow	
22		52.89	Daimí Pernía	Cuba	25 August 1999	Seville	
23		52.90	Nezha Bidouane	Morocco	25 August 1999	Seville	
24		52.92	Natalya Antyukh	Russia	30 July 2010	Barcelona	
25		52.94	Marina Stepanova	Soviet Union	17 September 1986	Tashkent	

==== Annulled marks ====
The following athletes have had their personal best annulled due to doping offences:

Annulled marks from the all-time top 25 of the women's 400 metres hurdles
Time (s)	Athlete	Nation	Date	Place	Ref.
52.70	Natalya Antyukh	Russia	8 August 2012	London	

== Milestones ==
- Men
  - First official IAAF world record: 55.0 seconds, Charles Bacon (USA), 1908
  - First under 54 seconds: 53.8 seconds, Sten Pettersson (SWE), 1925
  - First under 53 seconds: 52.6 seconds, John Gibson (USA), 1927
  - First under 52 seconds: 51.7 seconds, Bob Tisdall (IRL), 1932
  - First under 51 seconds: 50.6 seconds, Glenn Hardin (USA), 1934
  - First under 50 seconds: 49.5 seconds, Glenn Davis (USA), 1956
  - First under 49 seconds: 48.8 seconds, Geoff Vanderstock (USA), 1968
  - First under 48 seconds: 47.82 seconds, John Akii-Bua (UGA), 1972
  - First under 47 seconds: 46.78 seconds, Kevin Young (USA), 1992
  - First under 46 seconds: 45.94 seconds, Karsten Warholm (NOR), 2021
- Women
  - First official world record: 56.51 seconds, Krystyna Kacperczyk (POL), 1974
  - First under 56 seconds: 55.74 seconds, Tatyana Storozheva (URS), 1977
  - First under 55 seconds: 54.89 seconds, Tatyana Zelentsova (URS), 1978
  - First under 54 seconds: 53.58 seconds, Margarita Ponomaryova (URS), 1984
  - First under 53 seconds: 52.94 seconds, Marina Stepanova (URS), 1986
  - First under 52 seconds: 51.90 seconds, Sydney McLaughlin-Levrone (USA), 2021
  - First under 51 seconds: 50.68 seconds, Sydney McLaughlin-Levrone (USA), 2022

== Most successful athletes ==
American athlete Glenn Davis had a prodigious start to his hurdling career, running his first race in April 1956 in 54.4 s. Two months later, he ran a new world record with 49.5 s and later that year he won the 400 m hurdles at the Olympics, and was also the first to repeat that feat in 1960.

In terms of success and longevity in competition, Edwin Moses' record is significant: he won 122 races in a row between 1977 and 1987 plus two gold medals, at the 1976 Summer Olympics in Montréal and the 1984 Summer Olympics in Los Angeles. He was undefeated for exactly nine years nine months and nine days, from 26 August 1977 until 4 June 1987. He finished third in the 1988 Olympic final, the last race of his career. He also held the world record for sixteen years from when he first broke it at the Olympics on 25 July 1976 until it was finally broken by Kevin Young at the 1992 Summer Olympics in Barcelona.

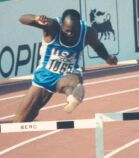
Edwin Moses

- Olympic Games & World Championships victories
  - Edwin Moses (USA), Olympic 1976, 1984, World 1983, 1987
  - Felix Sanchez (DOM), Olympic 2004, 2012, World 2001, 2003
  - Karsten Warholm (NOR), Olympic 2020, World 2017, 2019, 2023
  - Kerron Clement (USA), Olympic 2016, World 2007, 2009
  - Sally Gunnell (GBR), Olympic 1992, World 1993
  - Kevin Young (USA), Olympic 1992, World 1993
  - Derrick Adkins (USA), Olympic 1996, World 1995
  - Melaine Walker (JAM), Olympic 2008, World 2009
  - Lashinda Demus (USA), Olympic 2012, World 2011
  - Dalilah Muhammad (USA), Olympic 2016, World 2019
  - Sydney McLaughlin-Levrone (USA) Olympic 2020, 2024, World 2022
- Two Olympic victories:
  - Glenn Davis (USA), 1956 and 1960
  - Edwin Moses (USA), 1976 and 1984 (also bronze in 1988)
  - Angelo Taylor (USA), 2000 and 2008
  - Félix Sánchez (DOM), 2004 and 2012
  - Sydney McLaughlin-Levrone (USA), 2020 and 2024
- Three World Championships:
  - Karsten Warholm (NOR), 2017, 2019 and 2023
- Two World Championships:
  - Edwin Moses (USA), 1983 and 1987
  - Félix Sánchez (DOM), 2001 and 2003 (won silver in 2007)
  - Kerron Clement (USA), 2007 and 2009
  - Nezha Bidouane (MAR), 1997 and 2001 (won silver in 1999)
  - Jana Pittman (AUS), 2003 and 2007
  - Zuzana Hejnová (CZE), 2013 and 2015
  - Femke Bol (NED), 2023 and 2025

* Note: Edwin Moses, Kevin Young and Karsten Warholm are the only male 400 m hurdlers to have been Olympic Champion, World Champion, and broken the World Record.
* Note: Sally Gunnell, Dalilah Muhammad and Sydney McLaughlin-Levrone are the only female 400 m hurdlers to have been Olympic Champion, World Champion, and broken the World Record.

== Olympic medalists ==
=== Men ===
Games	Gold	Silver	Bronze
1900 Paris	Walter Tewksbury; United States	Henri Tauzin; France	George Orton; United States
1904 St. Louis	Harry Hillman; United States	Frank Waller; United States	George Poage; United States
1908 London	Charles Bacon; United States	Harry Hillman; United States	Jimmy Tremeer; Great Britain
1912 Stockholm	not included in the Olympic program		
1920 Antwerp	Frank Loomis; United States	John Norton; United States	August Desch; United States
1924 Paris	Morgan Taylor; United States	Erik Wilén; Finland	Ivan Riley; United States
1928 Amsterdam	David Burghley; Great Britain	Frank Cuhel; United States	Morgan Taylor; United States
1932 Los Angeles	Bob Tisdall; Ireland	Glenn Hardin; United States	Morgan Taylor; United States
1936 Berlin	Glenn Hardin; United States	John Loaring; Canada	Miguel White; Philippines
1948 London	Roy Cochran; United States	Duncan White; Ceylon	Rune Larsson; Sweden
1952 Helsinki	Charles Moore; United States	Yuriy Lituyev; Soviet Union	John Holland; New Zealand
1956 Melbourne	Glenn Davis; United States	Eddie Southern; United States	Josh Culbreath; United States
1960 Rome	Glenn Davis; United States	Clifton Cushman; United States	Dick Howard; United States
1964 Tokyo	Rex Cawley; United States	John Cooper; Great Britain	Salvatore Morale; Italy
1968 Mexico City	David Hemery; Great Britain	Gerhard Hennige; West Germany	John Sherwood; Great Britain
1972 Munich	John Akii-Bua; Uganda	Ralph Mann; United States	David Hemery; Great Britain
1976 Montreal	Edwin Moses; United States	Michael Shine; United States	Yevgeniy Gavrilenko; Soviet Union
1980 Moscow	Volker Beck; East Germany	Vasyl Arkhypenko; Soviet Union	Gary Oakes; Great Britain
1984 Los Angeles	Edwin Moses; United States	Danny Harris; United States	Harald Schmid; West Germany
1988 Seoul	André Phillips; United States	Amadou Dia Ba; Senegal	Edwin Moses; United States
1992 Barcelona	Kevin Young; United States	Winthrop Graham; Jamaica	Kriss Akabusi; Great Britain
1996 Atlanta	Derrick Adkins; United States	Samuel Matete; Zambia	Calvin Davis; United States
2000 Sydney	Angelo Taylor; United States	Hadi Al-Somaily; Saudi Arabia	Llewellyn Herbert; South Africa
2004 Athens	Félix Sánchez; Dominican Republic	Danny McFarlane; Jamaica	Naman Keïta; France
2008 Beijing	Angelo Taylor; United States	Kerron Clement; United States	Bershawn Jackson; United States
2012 London	Félix Sánchez; Dominican Republic	Michael Tinsley; United States	Javier Culson; Puerto Rico
2016 Rio de Janeiro	Kerron Clement; United States	Boniface Mucheru Tumuti; Kenya	Yasmani Copello; Turkey
2020 Tokyo	Karsten Warholm; Norway	Rai Benjamin; United States	Alison dos Santos; Brazil
2024 Paris	Rai Benjamin; United States	Karsten Warholm; Norway	Alison dos Santos; Brazil
2028 Los Angeles			

=== Women ===
Games	Gold	Silver	Bronze
1984 Los Angeles	Nawal El Moutawakel; Morocco	Judi Brown; United States	Cristieana Cojocaru; Romania
1988 Seoul	Debbie Flintoff-King; Australia	Tatyana Ledovskaya; Soviet Union	Ellen Fiedler; East Germany
1992 Barcelona	Sally Gunnell; Great Britain	Sandra Farmer-Patrick; United States	Janeene Vickers; United States
1996 Atlanta	Deon Hemmings; Jamaica	Kim Batten; United States	Tonja Buford-Bailey; United States
2000 Sydney	Irina Privalova; Russia	Deon Hemmings; Jamaica	Nezha Bidouane; Morocco
2004 Athens	Fani Halkia; Greece	Ionela Târlea-Manolache; Romania	Tetyana Tereshchuk-Antipova; Ukraine
2008 Beijing	Melaine Walker; Jamaica	Sheena Tosta; United States	Tasha Danvers; Great Britain
2012 London	Lashinda Demus; United States	Zuzana Hejnová; Czech Republic	Kaliese Spencer; Jamaica
2016 Rio de Janeiro	Dalilah Muhammad; United States	Sara Petersen; Denmark	Ashley Spencer; United States
2020 Tokyo	Sydney McLaughlin; United States	Dalilah Muhammad; United States	Femke Bol; Netherlands
2024 Paris	Sydney McLaughlin-Levrone; United States	Anna Cockrell; United States	Femke Bol; Netherlands
2028 Los Angeles			

== World Championships medalists ==
=== Men ===
Championships	Gold	Silver	Bronze
1983 Helsinki	Edwin Moses (USA)	Harald Schmid (FRG)	Aleksandr Kharlov (URS)
1987 Rome	Edwin Moses (USA)	Danny Harris (USA)	Harald Schmid (FRG)
1991 Tokyo	Samuel Matete (ZAM)	Winthrop Graham (JAM)	Kriss Akabusi (GBR)
1993 Stuttgart	Kevin Young (USA)	Samuel Matete (ZAM)	Winthrop Graham (JAM)
1995 Gothenburg	Derrick Adkins (USA)	Samuel Matete (ZAM)	Stéphane Diagana (FRA)
1997 Athens	Stéphane Diagana (FRA)	Llewellyn Herbert (RSA)	Bryan Bronson (USA)
1999 Seville	Fabrizio Mori (ITA)	Stéphane Diagana (FRA)	Marcel Schelbert (SUI)
2001 Edmonton	Félix Sánchez (DOM)	Fabrizio Mori (ITA)	Dai Tamesue (JPN)
2003 Saint-Denis	Félix Sánchez (DOM)	Joey Woody (USA)	Periklis Iakovakis (GRE)
2005 Helsinki	Bershawn Jackson (USA)	James Carter (USA)	Dai Tamesue (JPN)
2007 Osaka	Kerron Clement (USA)	Félix Sánchez (DOM)	Marek Plawgo (POL)
2009 Berlin	Kerron Clement (USA)	Javier Culson (PUR)	Bershawn Jackson (USA)
2011 Daegu	Dai Greene (GBR)	Javier Culson (PUR)	L. J. van Zyl (RSA)
2013 Moscow	Jehue Gordon (TRI)	Michael Tinsley (USA)	Emir Bekrić (SRB)
2015 Beijing	Nicholas Bett (KEN)	Denis Kudryavtsev (RUS)	Jeffery Gibson (BAH)
2017 London	Karsten Warholm (NOR)	Yasmani Copello (TUR)	Kerron Clement (USA)
2019 Doha	Karsten Warholm (NOR)	Rai Benjamin (USA)	Abderrahman Samba (QAT)
2022 Eugene	Alison dos Santos (BRA)	Rai Benjamin (USA)	Trevor Bassitt (USA)
2023 Budapest	Karsten Warholm (NOR)	Kyron McMaster (BVI)	Rai Benjamin (USA)
2025 Tokyo	Rai Benjamin (USA)	Alison dos Santos (BRA)	Abderrahman Samba (QAT)

==== Medal table ====
Rank	Nation	Gold	Silver	Bronze	Total
1	United States (USA)	8	6	5	19
2	Norway (NOR)	3	0	0	3
3	Dominican Republic (DOM)	2	1	0	3
4	Zambia (ZAM)	1	2	0	3
5	France (FRA)	1	1	1	3
6	Brazil (BRA)	1	1	0	2
6	Italy (ITA)	1	1	0	2
8	Great Britain (GBR)	1	0	1	2
9	Kenya (KEN)	1	0	0	1
9	Trinidad and Tobago (TTO)	1	0	0	1
11	Puerto Rico (PUR)	0	2	0	2
12	Germany (GER)	0	1	1	2
12	Jamaica (JAM)	0	1	1	2
12	South Africa (RSA)	0	1	1	2
15	British Virgin Islands (BVI)	0	1	0	1
15	Russia (RUS)	0	1	0	1
15	Turkey (TUR)	0	1	0	1
18	Japan (JPN)	0	0	2	2
18	Qatar (QAT)	0	0	2	2
20	Bahamas (BAH)	0	0	1	1
20	Greece (GRE)	0	0	1	1
20	Poland (POL)	0	0	1	1
20	Serbia (SRB)	0	0	1	1
20	Soviet Union (URS)	0	0	1	1
20	Switzerland (SUI)	0	0	1	1
Totals (25 entries)		20	20	20	60

=== Women ===
- The official World Athletics Championships began in 1983 as the IAAF World Championships in Athletics, but in 1980, the women's 3000 metres and 400 metres hurdles events had a World Championship competition in Sittard, Netherlands. This was due to these events not yet being on the Olympic program (the same had happened in 1976 for the men's 50 km walk).

Championships	Gold	Silver	Bronze
1980 Sittard	Bärbel Broschat (GDR)	Ellen Neumann (GDR)	Petra Pfaff (GDR)
1983 Helsinki	Yekaterina Fesenko (URS)	Ana Ambrazienė (URS)	Ellen Neumann-Fiedler (GDR)
1987 Rome	Sabine Busch (GDR)	Debbie Flintoff (AUS)	Cornelia Feuerbach (GDR)
1991 Tokyo	Tatyana Ledovskaya (URS)	Sally Gunnell (GBR)	Janeene Vickers (USA)
1993 Stuttgart	Sally Gunnell (GBR)	Sandra Farmer-Patrick (USA)	Margarita Ponomaryova (RUS)
1995 Gothenburg	Kim Batten (USA)	Tonja Buford (USA)	Deon Hemmings (JAM)
1997 Athens	Nezha Bidouane (MAR)	Deon Hemmings (JAM)	Kim Batten (USA)
1999 Seville	Daimí Pernía (CUB)	Nezha Bidouane (MAR)	Deon Hemmings (JAM)
2001 Edmonton	Nezha Bidouane (MAR)	Yuliya Pechonkina (RUS)	Daimí Pernía (CUB)
2003 Saint-Denis	Jana Pittman (AUS)	Sandra Glover (USA)	Yuliya Pechonkina (RUS)
2005 Helsinki	Yuliya Pechonkina (RUS)	Lashinda Demus (USA)	Sandra Glover (USA)
2007 Osaka	Jana Rawlinson (AUS)	Yuliya Pechenkina (RUS)	Anna Jesień (POL)
2009 Berlin	Melaine Walker (JAM)	Lashinda Demus (USA)	Josanne Lucas (TRI)
2011 Daegu	Lashinda Demus (USA)	Melaine Walker (JAM)	Natalya Antyukh (RUS)
2013 Moscow	Zuzana Hejnová (CZE)	Dalilah Muhammad (USA)	Lashinda Demus (USA)
2015 Beijing	Zuzana Hejnová (CZE)	Shamier Little (USA)	Cassandra Tate (USA)
2017 London	Kori Carter (USA)	Dalilah Muhammad (USA)	Ristananna Tracey (JAM)
2019 Doha	Dalilah Muhammad (USA)	Sydney McLaughlin (USA)	Rushell Clayton (JAM)
2022 Eugene	Sydney McLaughlin (USA)	Femke Bol (NED)	Dalilah Muhammad (USA)
2023 Budapest	Femke Bol (NED)	Shamier Little (USA)	Rushell Clayton (JAM)
2025 Tokyo	Femke Bol (NED)	Jasmine Jones (USA)	Emma Zapletalová (SVK)

==== Medal table ====
Rank	Nation	Gold	Silver	Bronze	Total
1	United States (USA)	5	11	6	22
2	East Germany (GDR)	2	1	3	6
3	Australia (AUS)	2	1	0	3
3	Morocco (MAR)	2	1	0	3
3	Soviet Union (URS)	2	1	0	3
3	Netherlands (NED)	2	1	0	3
7	Czech Republic (CZE)	2	0	0	2
8	Jamaica (JAM)	1	2	4	7
9	Russia (RUS)	1	2	3	6
10	Great Britain (GBR)	1	1	0	2
11	Cuba (CUB)	1	0	1	2
12	Denmark (DEN)	1	0	0	1
13	Spain (ESP)	0	1	0	1
13	Turkey (TUR)	0	1	0	1
17	Poland (POL)	0	0	1	1
17	Trinidad and Tobago (TTO)	0	0	1	1
17	Slovakia (SVK)	0	0	1	1

== World leading times ==
=== Men ===
Year	Time	Athlete	Place
1971	48.9 h	Ralph Mann (USA)	Helsinki
1972	47.82	John Akii-Bua (UGA)	Munich
1973	48.54	John Akii-Bua (UGA)	Lagos
1974	48.1 h	Jim Bolding (USA)	Milan
1975	48.4 h	Jim Bolding (USA)	Milan
1976	47.63	Edwin Moses (USA)	Montreal
1977	47.45	Edwin Moses (USA)	Westwood
1978	47.94	Edwin Moses (USA)	Zurich
1979	47.53	Edwin Moses (USA)	Montreal
1980	47.13	Edwin Moses (USA)	Milan
1981	47.14	Edwin Moses (USA)	Lausanne
1982	47.48	Harald Schmid (FRG)	Athens
1983	47.02	Edwin Moses (USA)	Koblenz
1984	47.32	Edwin Moses (USA)	Koblenz
1985	47.63	Danny Harris (USA)	Zurich
1986	47.38	Edwin Moses (USA)	Lausanne
1987	47.46	Edwin Moses (USA)	Rome
1988	47.19	Andre Phillips (USA)	Seoul
1989	47.86	Kevin Young (USA)	Berlin
1990	47.49	Danny Harris (USA)	Lausanne
1991	47.10	Samuel Matete (ZAM)	Zurich
1992	46.78	Kevin Young (USA)	Barcelona
1993	47.18	Kevin Young (USA)	Stuttgart
1994	47.70	Derrick Adkins (USA)	Linz
1995	47.37	Stéphane Diagana (FRA)	Lausanne
1996	47.54	Derrick Adkins (USA)	Atlanta
1997	47.64	Bryan Bronson (USA)	Monaco
1998	47.03	Bryan Bronson (USA)	New Orleans
1999	47.72	Fabrizio Mori (ITA)	Seville
2000	47.50	Angelo Taylor (USA)	Sydney
2001	47.38	Félix Sánchez (DOM)	Zurich
2002	47.35	Félix Sánchez (DOM)	Zurich
2003	47.25	Félix Sánchez (DOM)	Saint-Denis
2004	47.63	Félix Sánchez (DOM)	Athens
2005	47.24	Kerron Clement (USA)	Carson
2006	47.39	Kerron Clement (USA)	Indianapolis
2007	47.61	Kerron Clement (USA)	Osaka
2008	47.25	Angelo Taylor (USA)	Beijing
2009	47.91	Kerron Clement (USA)	Berlin
2010	47.32	Bershawn Jackson (USA)	Des Moines
2011	47.66	L. J. van Zyl (RSA)	Pretoria
2011	47.66	L. J. van Zyl (RSA)	Ostrava
2012	47.63	Félix Sánchez (DOM)	London
2013	47.69	Jehue Gordon (TRI)	Moscow
2014	48.03	Javier Culson (PUR)	New York City
2015	47.79	Nicholas Bett (KEN)	Beijing
2016	47.73	Kerron Clement (USA)	Rio de Janeiro
2017	47.80	Kyron McMaster (IVB)	Kingston
2018	46.98	Abderrahman Samba (QAT)	Paris
2019	46.92	Karsten Warholm (NOR)	Zurich
2020	46.87	Karsten Warholm (NOR)	Stockholm
2021	45.94	Karsten Warholm (NOR)	Tokyo
2022	46.29	Alison dos Santos (BRA)	Eugene
2023	46.39	Rai Benjamin (USA)	Eugene
2024	46.46	Rai Benjamin (USA)	Eugene
2025	46.28	Karsten Warholm (NOR)	Chorzów
2026	45.80	Alison dos Santos (BRA)	Zurich

=== Women ===
Year	Time	Athlete	Place
1971	—	—	—
1972	—	—	—
1973	56.7 h	Danuta Piecyk (POL)	Warsaw
1974	56.51	Krystyna Kacperczyk (POL)	Augsburg
1975	—	—	—
1976	—	—	—
1977	55.63	Karin Roßley (GDR)	Helsinki
1978	54.89	Tatyana Zelentsova (URS)	Prague
1979	54.78	Marina Stepanova (URS)	Moscow
1980	54.28	Karin Roßley (GDR)	Jena
1981	54.79	Ellen Fiedler (GDR)	Jena
1982	54.57	Ann-Louise Skoglund (SWE)	Athens
1983	54.02	Anna Ambrazienė (URS)	Moscow
1984	53.58	Margarita Ponomaryova (URS)	Kyiv
1985	53.55	Sabine Busch (GDR)	Berlin
1986	52.94	Marina Stepanova (URS)	Tashkent
1987	53.24	Sabine Busch (GDR)	Potsdam
1988	53.17	Debbie Flintoff-King (AUS)	Seoul
1989	53.37	Sandra Farmer-Patrick (USA)	New York City
1990	53.62	Tatyana Ledovskaya (URS)	Split
1991	53.11	Tatyana Ledovskaya (URS)	Tokyo
1992	53.23	Sally Gunnell (GBR)	Barcelona
1993	52.74	Sally Gunnell (GBR)	Stuttgart
1994	53.33	Sally Gunnell (GBR)	Helsinki
1995	52.61	Kim Batten (USA)	Gothenburg
1996	52.82	Deon Hemmings (JAM)	Atlanta
1997	52.97	Kim Batten (USA)	Indianapolis
1997	52.97	Nezha Bidouane (MAR)	Athens
1998	52.74	Kim Batten (USA)	Monaco
1999	52.89	Daimí Pernía (CUB)	Seville
2000	53.02	Irina Privalova (RUS)	Sydney
2001	53.34	Nezha Bidouane (MAR)	Edmonton
2002	53.10	Yuliya Pechonkina (RUS)	Tula
2003	52.34	Yuliya Pechonkina (RUS)	Tula
2004	52.77	Faní Halkiá (GRE)	Athens
2005	52.90	Yuliya Pechonkina (RUS)	Helsinki
2006	53.02	Lashinda Demus (USA)	Athens
2007	53.28	Tiffany Williams (USA)	Indianapolis
2008	52.64	Melaine Walker (JAM)	Beijing
2009	52.42	Melaine Walker (JAM)	Berlin
2010	52.82	Lashinda Demus (USA)	Rome
2011	52.47	Lashinda Demus (USA)	Daegu
2012	52.77	Lashinda Demus (USA)	London
2013	52.83	Zuzana Hejnová (CZE)	Moscow
2014	53.41	Kaliese Spencer (JAM)	Kingston
2015	53.50	Zuzana Hejnová (CZE)	Beijing
2016	52.88	Dalilah Muhammad (USA)	Eugene
2017	52.64	Dalilah Muhammad (USA)	Sacramento
2018	52.75	Sydney McLaughlin (USA)	Knoxville
2019	52.16	Dalilah Muhammad (USA)	Doha
2020	53.79	Femke Bol (NED)	Arnhem
2021	51.46	Sydney McLaughlin (USA)	Tokyo
2022	50.68	Sydney McLaughlin-Levrone (USA)	Eugene
2023	51.45	Femke Bol (NED)	London
2024	50.37	Sydney McLaughlin-Levrone (USA)	Saint-Denis
2025	51.54	Femke Bol (NED)	Tokyo
2026	52.13	Anna Cockrell (USA)	Zurich

== See also ==
- National records in the 400 metres hurdles
