= Sergey Petrov (politician) =

Russian politician

- Сергей Петров
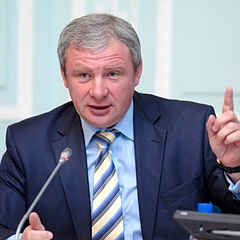

Member of the State Duma for Leningrad Oblast
- Incumbent
- Assumed office 5 October 2016
- Preceded by: constituency re-established
- Constituency: Volkhov (No. 113)

Member of the State Duma (Party List Seat)
- In office 24 December 2007 – 5 October 2016

Personal details
- Born: 19 April 1965 (age 61) Volkhov, Leningrad Oblast, Russian SFSR, USSR
- Party: United Russia
- Education: A.F. Mozhaysky Military-Space Academy

Sergey Valerievich Petrov (Russian: Сергей Валериевич Петров; born 19 April 1965, Volkhov) is a Russian political figure and a deputy of the 5th, 6th, 7th, and 8th State Dumas.

From 1989 to 2001, Petrov served in command and engineering positions at the A.F. Mozhaysky Military-Space Academy. In 2002, he co-founded the development company SVP group. In 2008, he started working as the head of the North-West Interregional Coordinating Council of the United Russia. Petrov started his political career in 2007 when he was elected deputy of the 5th State Duma. In 2011, 2016, 2021, he was re-elected as deputy of the 6th, 7th, and 8th State Dumas from the Leningrad Oblast constituency.

== Sanctions ==
He was sanctioned by the UK government in 2022 in relation to the Russo-Ukrainian War.

== Awards ==
- Order of Friendship
