= Marina Stepanova =

Russian former athlete (born 1950)

Personal information
- Nationality: Soviet Union
- Born: 1 May 1950 (age 76) Meglevo, Russian SFSR, USSR
- Height: 1.67 m (5 ft 5 1/2 in)
- Weight: 60 kg (132 lb; 9 st 6 lb)

Sport
- Country: USSR
- Sport: Track and field
- Event: 400 m hurdles
- Retired: 1987
Medal record
Women's athletics
Representing Soviet Union
European Championships
Gold medal – first place	1986 Stuttgart	400 m hurdles

Marina Ivanovna Stepanova (née Makeyeva (Russian: Марина Ивановна Степанова-Макеева) born 1 May 1950) is a Russian former athlete who competed for the Soviet Union in the 400 metres hurdles, and became the first woman to run under 53 seconds for the event, when she ran 52.94 secs in 1986.

== Career ==
Born in Meglevo, Imeni Sverdlova settlement, Stepanova started to compete internationally in 1978 at the European Championships in Prague where she finished sixth in her semifinal heat. That year she had a PB of 56.19 seconds in the 400m hurdles. In 1979, she broke the world record for the first time, running 54.78 seconds at the Soviet Spartakiad, defeating previous world record holder Tatyana Zelentsova.

Stepanova retired at the end of the 1980 season and gave birth to a daughter in 1981. She returned in 1983 and quickly regained her form. Unable to attend the 1984 Olympic Games due to the Soviet-led boycott, she did improve her personal best to 53.67 seconds when winning at the 1984 Friendship Games, defeating the 1983 World champion Yekaterina Fesenko and world record holder Margarita Ponomaryova.

At the 1986 Goodwill Games in July, Stepanova won in 53.81 secs. A month later at the 1986 European Championships in Stuttgart, she won the gold medal in the world record time of 53.32 seconds. Three weeks later in Tashkent, Stepanova became the first woman in history to break 53 seconds in the 400 m hurdles, improving her world record to 52.94 seconds at the age of 36. This would remain the world record for seven years until Sally Gunnell ran 52.74 secs in 1993. After the 1987 season she retired at the age of 37.

Year	Competition	Venue	Position	Event	Notes
1978	European Championships	Prague, Czechoslovakia	11th (sf)	400 m hurdles	57.49
1979	World Cup	Montreal, Canada	2nd	400 m hurdles	56.02
1984	Friendship Games	Prague, Czechoslovakia	1st	400 m hurdles	53.67
1986	Goodwill Games	Moscow, Soviet Union	1st	400 m hurdles	53.81
1986	Goodwill Games	Moscow, Soviet Union	2nd	4 × 400 m relay	3:21.99
1986	European Championships	Stuttgart, Germany	1st	400 m hurdles	53.32
(sf) Indicates overall position in semifinal round

== Personal Bests ==
Date	Event	Time	Place
17 September 1986	400 m hurdles	52.94s	Tashkent, USSR
1980	400 m	51.25s	
