= Sergei Petrov (footballer, born 1974) =

Russian footballer and coach

Personal information
- Full name: Sergei Vyacheslavovich Petrov
- Date of birth: 22 September 1974 (age 52)
- Place of birth: Ivanovo, Russian SFSR
- Height: 1.83 m (6 ft 0 in)
- Position: Goalkeeper

Youth career
- FC Tekstilshchik Ivanovo

Senior career*
Years	Team	Apps	(Gls)
1991–1999	FC Tekstilshchik Ivanovo	75	(0)
1999–2001	FC Severstal Cherepovets	23	(0)
2004	FC Tekstilshchik-2 Ivanovo		

Managerial career
- 2003–2010: FC Tekstilshchik Ivanovo (youth)
- 2011–2016: FC Tekstilshchik-M Ivanovo
- 2016: FC Tekstilshchik Ivanovo
- * Club domestic league appearances and goals

Sergei Vyacheslavovich Petrov (Russian: Сергей Вячеславович Петров; born 22 September 1974) is a Russian football coach and a former player.

Petrov played in the Russian First League with FC Tekstilshchik Ivanovo.
