= Imeni Sverdlova, Russia =

Imeni Sverdlova имени Свердлова
- Urban-type settlement
- Interactive map of Imeni Sverdlova
- Location of Imeni Sverdlova Imeni Sverdlova (Leningrad Oblast)
- Coordinates: 59°47′30″N 30°40′00″E
- Country: Russia
- Federal subject: Leningrad Oblast
- Administrative district: Vsevolozhsky District
- Founded: 1875

Population (2010 Census)
  - Total: 9,260
  - Estimate (2024): 12,608 (+36.2%)

Municipal status
  - Municipal district: Vsevolozhsky Municipal District
  - Urban settlement: Sverdlovskoye Urban Settlement
  - Capital of: Sverdlovskoye Urban Settlement
- Time zone: UTC+3 (MSK)
- Postal codes: 188682 (мкр Овцино), 188683
- OKTMO ID: 41612168051
- Website: www.sverdlovo-adm.ru/city/about/

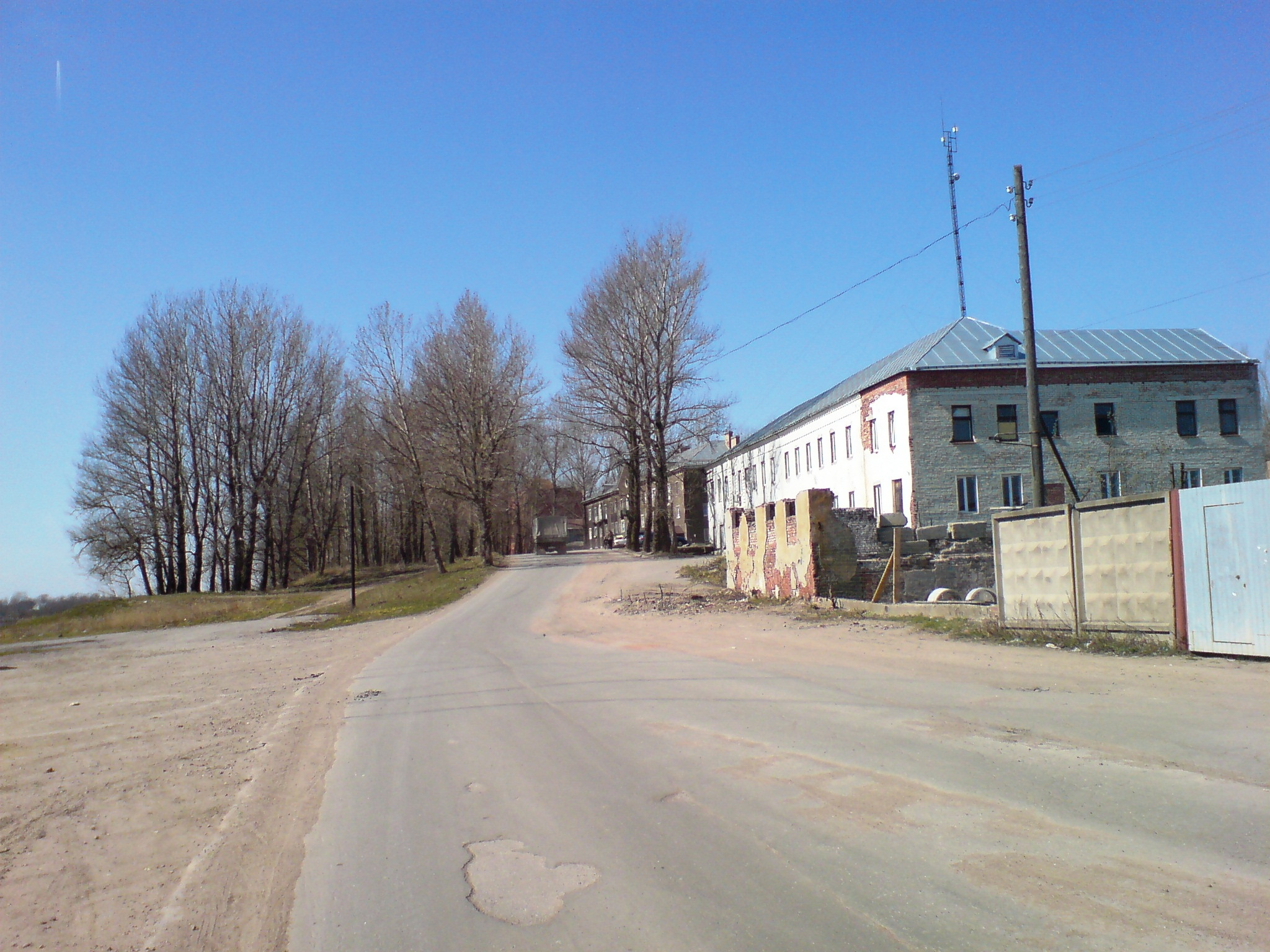
A street in Imeni Sverdlova

Imeni Sverdlova (Russian: и́мени Свердло́ва) is an urban locality (an urban-type settlement) in Vsevolozhsky District of Leningrad Oblast, Russia, located on the right bank of the Neva River, southeast of the center of Saint Petersburg and opposite to Ust-Izhora. Municipally it is incorporated as Sverdlovskoye Urban Settlement, one of the eight urban settlements in the district. Population: 9,260 (2010 census); 9,197 (2002 census); 8,905 (1989 Soviet census).

== History ==
The settlement was founded in the 19th century to serve the brick factory built by merchant Pirogov. At the time, it was a part of Shlisselburgsky Uyezd of Saint Petersburg Governorate. In 1914, the governorate was renamed Petrogradsky. On February 14, 1923 Shlisselburgsky Uyezd was merged into Petrogradsky Uyezd. In January, 1924 the uyezd and the governorate were renamed Leningradsky.

On August 1, 1927, the uyezds were abolished and Kolpinsky District, with the administrative center in the town of Kolpino, was established. The settlement became a part of Ovtsynsky Selsoviet of Kolpinsky District. On August 19, 1930 Kolpinsky District was abolished and merged into newly established Leningradsky Prigorodny District with the administrative center in the city of Leningrad. On August 19, 1936 Leningradsky Prigorodny District was abolished, and the settlement was transferred into Slutsky District. In 1944, Slutsky District was renamed Pavlovsky, and on April 28, 1948 Ust-Izhorsky Selsoviet, which included the settlement, was transferred to Vsevolozhsky District. In 1961, the settlement was named Imeni Sverdlova. It was granted urban-type settlement status in 1979.

== Economy ==
=== Industry ===
Industrial enterprises located in Imeni Sverdlova produce construction materials (in particular, brick), and food (in particular, packed tea and coffee).

=== Transportation ===
Imeni Sverdlova has an access to the M18 highway, which connects Saint Petersburg and Murmansk via Petrozavodsk. A paved road along the bank of the Neva connects it directly with Saint Petersburg.

The Neva is navigable. There are no bridges or ferries across the river in Imeni Sverdlova.

== Culture and recreation ==
Imeni Sverdlova contains one cultural heritage monuments of federal significance which commemorates the events of the Siege of Leningrad.
