= Krystyna Kacperczyk =

Polish sprinter

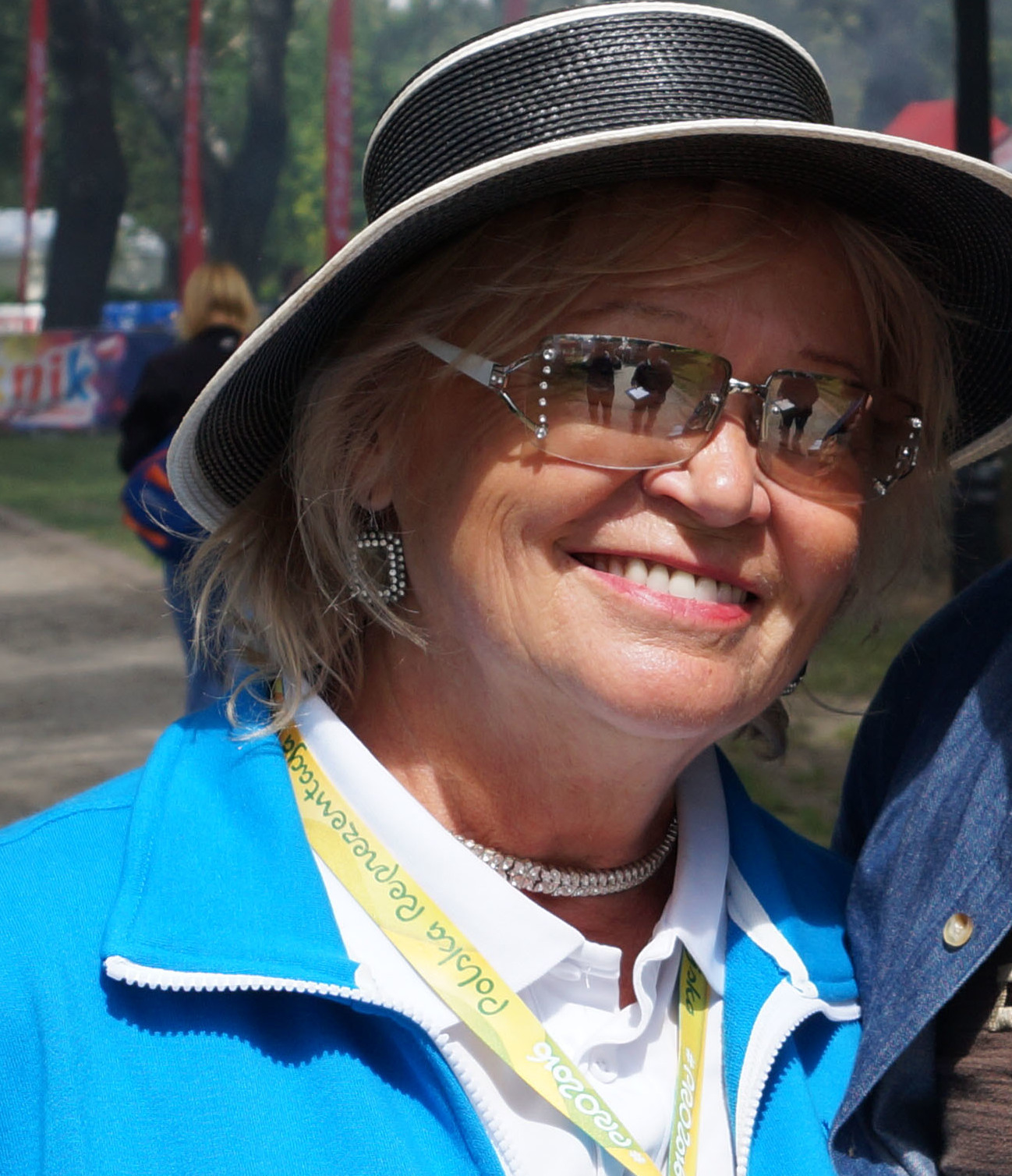

Personal information
- Nationality: Polish
- Born: 13 October 1948 (age 77)

Sport
- Sport: Sprinting
- Event: 400 metres
- Club: Jagiellonia Białystok; Skra Warszawa
Medal record
Women's athletics
Representing Poland
European Championships
Bronze medal – third place	1978 Prague	4×400 m
European Indoor Championships
Bronze medal – third place	1973 Rotterdam	4×340 m
Bronze medal – third place	1975 Katowice	4×320 m

Krystyna Kacperczyk (born 13 October 1948) is a Polish sprinter. She competed in the women's 400 metres at the 1972 Summer Olympics.
