= Krasny Bor, Russia =

Krasny Bor (Russian: Красный Бор) is the name of several inhabited localities in Russia.

== Arkhangelsk Oblast ==
As of 2012, two rural localities in Arkhangelsk Oblast bear this name:

- Krasny Bor, Pinezhsky District, Arkhangelsk Oblast, a settlement in Pinezhsky Selsoviet of Pinezhsky District
- Krasny Bor, Ustyansky District, Arkhangelsk Oblast, a settlement in Chadromsky Selsoviet of Ustyansky District

== Bryansk Oblast ==
As of 2012, five rural localities in Bryansk Oblast bear this name:

- Krasny Bor, Klimovsky District, Bryansk Oblast, a settlement in Kamenskokhutorsky Rural Administrative Okrug of Klimovsky District; 52°9′N 32°17′E
- Krasny Bor, Navlinsky District, Bryansk Oblast, a settlement in Chichkovsky Rural Administrative Okrug of Navlinsky District; 53°1′N 34°31′E
- Krasny Bor, Pogarsky District, Bryansk Oblast, a settlement in Vadkovsky Rural Administrative Okrug of Pogarsky District; 52°33′N 33°20′E
- Krasny Bor, Surazhsky District, Bryansk Oblast, a settlement in Ovchinsky Rural Administrative Okrug of Surazhsky District; 53°4′N 32°32′E
- Krasny Bor, Zhukovsky District, Bryansk Oblast, a settlement in Rzhanitsky Rural Administrative Okrug of Zhukovsky District; 53°23′N 33°59′E

== Kaliningrad Oblast ==
As of 2012, three rural localities in Kaliningrad Oblast bear this name:

- Krasny Bor, Gvardeysky District, Kaliningrad Oblast, a settlement in Ozerkovsky Rural Okrug of Gvardeysky District
- Krasny Bor, Ozyorsky District, Kaliningrad Oblast, a settlement in Gavrilovsky Rural Okrug of Ozyorsky District
- Krasny Bor, Polessky District, Kaliningrad Oblast, a settlement in Saransky Rural Okrug of Polessky District

== Kaluga Oblast ==
As of 2012, one rural locality in Kaluga Oblast bears this name:

- Krasny Bor, Kaluga Oblast, a village in Kuybyshevsky District

== Kostroma Oblast ==
As of 2012, one rural locality in Kostroma Oblast bears this name:

- Krasny Bor, Kostroma Oblast, a settlement in Ileshevskoye Settlement of Kologrivsky District; 58°56′N 44°8′E

== Kurgan Oblast ==
As of 2012, one rural locality in Kurgan Oblast bears this name:

- Krasny Bor, Kurgan Oblast, a settlement in Vyatkinsky Selsoviet of Kargapolsky District; 56°2′N 64°37′E

== Leningrad Oblast ==
As of 2012, five inhabited localities in Leningrad Oblast bear this name:

Urban localities

- Krasny Bor, Tosnensky District, Leningrad Oblast, an urban-type settlement under the administrative jurisdiction of Krasnoborskoye Settlement Municipal Formation in Tosnensky District; 59°41′N 30°41′E

Rural localities

- Krasny Bor, Boksitogorsky District, Leningrad Oblast, a village in Radogoshchinskoye Settlement Municipal Formation of Boksitogorsky District; 59°58′N 35°14′E
- Krasny Bor, Lodeynopolsky District, Leningrad Oblast, a village in Alekhovshchinskoye Settlement Municipal Formation of Lodeynopolsky District; 60°21′N 34°15′E
- Krasny Bor, Lomonosovsky District, Leningrad Oblast, a village in Gostilitskoye Settlement Municipal Formation of Lomonosovsky District; 59°41′N 29°37′E
- Krasny Bor, Podporozhsky District, Leningrad Oblast, a village under the administrative jurisdiction of Voznesenskoye Settlement Municipal Formation in Podporozhsky District; 61°3′N 35°24′E

== Nizhny Novgorod Oblast ==
As of 2012, two rural localities in Nizhny Novgorod Oblast bear this name:

- Krasny Bor, Shatkovsky District, Nizhny Novgorod Oblast, a settlement in Krasnoborsky Selsoviet of Shatkovsky District; 55°16′N 44°0′E
- Krasny Bor, Sokolsky District, Nizhny Novgorod Oblast, a village in Mezhdurechensky Selsoviet of Sokolsky District; 57°9′N 43°31′E

== Novgorod Oblast ==
As of 2012, two rural localities in Novgorod Oblast bear this name:

- Krasny Bor, Kholmsky District, Novgorod Oblast, a village in Krasnoborskoye Settlement of Kholmsky District
- Krasny Bor, Maryovsky District, Novgorod Oblast, a village in Moiseyevskoye Settlement of Maryovsky District

== Pskov Oblast ==
As of 2012, two rural localities in Pskov Oblast bear this name:

- Krasny Bor, Dnovsky District, Pskov Oblast, a village in Dnovsky District
- Krasny Bor, Porkhovsky District, Pskov Oblast, a village in Porkhovsky District

== Smolensk Oblast ==
As of 2012, one rural locality in Smolensk Oblast bears this name:

- Krasny Bor, Smolensk Oblast, a village in Iozefovskoye Rural Settlement of Khislavichsky District

== Sverdlovsk Oblast ==
As of 2012, one rural locality in Sverdlovsk Oblast bears this name:

- Krasny Bor, Sverdlovsk Oblast, a settlement in Gorodishchensky Selsoviet of Baykalovsky District

== Republic of Tatarstan ==
As of 2012, two rural localities in the Republic of Tatarstan bear this name:

- Krasny Bor, Agryzsky District, Republic of Tatarstan, a selo in Agryzsky District
- Krasny Bor, Nizhnekamsky District, Republic of Tatarstan, a village in Nizhnekamsky District

== Tver Oblast ==
As of 2012, two rural localities in Tver Oblast bear this name:

- Krasny Bor, Kalininsky District, Tver Oblast, a village in Kulitskoye Rural Settlement of Kalininsky District
- Krasny Bor, Kashinsky District, Tver Oblast, a village in Verkhnetroitskoye Rural Settlement of Kashinsky District

== Ulyanovsk Oblast ==
As of 2012, two rural localities in Ulyanovsk Oblast bear this name:

- Krasny Bor, Kuzovatovsky District, Ulyanovsk Oblast, a settlement in Yedelevsky Rural Okrug of Kuzovatovsky District
- Krasny Bor, Veshkaymsky District, Ulyanovsk Oblast, a selo under the administrative jurisdiction of Veshkaymsky Settlement Okrug in Veshkaymsky District

== Vladimir Oblast ==
As of 2012, one rural locality in Vladimir Oblast bears this name:

- Krasny Bor, Vladimir Oblast, a village in Muromsky District

== Vologda Oblast ==
As of 2012, one rural locality in Vologda Oblast bears this name:

- Krasny Bor, Vologda Oblast, a settlement in Kalininsky Selsoviet of Totemsky District

== Yaroslavl Oblast ==
As of 2012, four rural localities in Yaroslavl Oblast bear this name:

- Krasny Bor, Lyubimsky District, Yaroslavl Oblast, a village in Osetsky Rural Okrug of Lyubimsky District
- Krasny Bor, Tutayevsky District, Yaroslavl Oblast, a settlement in Pomogalovsky Rural Okrug of Tutayevsky District
- Krasny Bor (settlement), Pestretsovsky Rural Okrug, Yaroslavsky District, Yaroslavl Oblast, a settlement in Pestretsovsky Rural Okrug of Yaroslavsky District
- Krasny Bor (village), Pestretsovsky Rural Okrug, Yaroslavsky District, Yaroslavl Oblast, a village in Pestretsovsky Rural Okrug of Yaroslavsky District
