= Krasny Bor =

Krasny Bor may refer to:

- Krasny Bor Forest, Karelia, a forest and a memorial cemetery in the Republic of Karelia, Russia
- Battle of Krasny Bor, a battle for Krasny Bor, Leningrad Oblast, during Operation Polar Star in February 1943
- Krasny Bor, Russia, several inhabited localities in Russia
- Krasny Bór, a village in Poland
