= Shatki =

Shatki (Russian: Шатки) is the name of several inhabited localities (work settlements and villages) in Russia.

Urban localities

- Shatki, Nizhny Novgorod Oblast, a work settlement in Shatkovsky District of Nizhny Novgorod Oblast

Rural localities

- Shatki, Kirov Oblast, a village in Kurchumsky Rural Okrug of Sunsky District of Kirov Oblast
