= Savicheva =

Savicheva (Russian: Са́вичева) is a Russian surname. Notable people with this surname include:

- Tanya Savicheva (1930–1944), Russian child diarist who survived the Siege of Leningrad during World War II
- Yulia Savicheva (born 1987), Russian singer who performed in the 2004 Eurovision Song Contest
