= 2024 Mari El State Assembly election =

Regional election in Mari El, Russia

- 6–8 September 2024

All 52 seats in the State Assembly 27 seats needed for a majority
- Turnout: 38.72% ▲3.69 pp
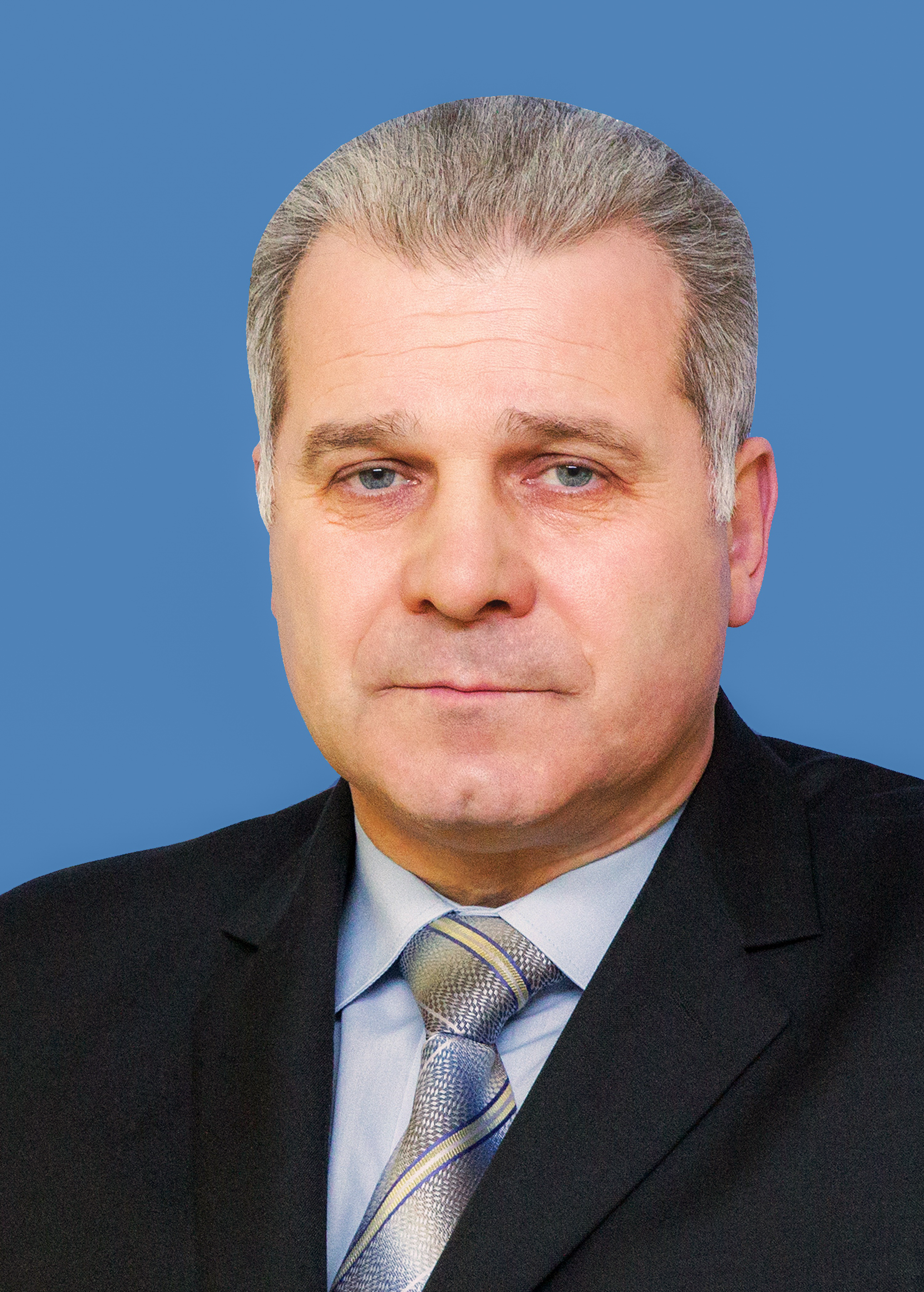
	Majority party	Minority party	Third party
		CPRF	LDPR
Candidate	Sergey Martynov	Sergey Tsaregorodtsev	Aleksey Sherstobitov
Party	United Russia	CPRF	LDPR
Last election	37.49%, 33 seats	26.92%, 9 seats	15.78%, 3 seats
Seats won	48	2	1
Seat change	▲15	▼7	▼2
Popular vote	124,378	23,502	17,577
Percentage	61.23%	11.57%	8.65%
Swing	▲23.74 pp	▼15.35 pp	▼7.13 pp
	Fourth party	Fifth party	Sixth party
	SR-ZP	NL	RPPSS
Candidate	Natalia Glushchenko	Denis Kravtsov	Valentina Zlobina
Party	SR-ZP	New People	RPPSS
Last election	7.78%, 3 seats	Did not exist	4.93%, 0 seats
Seats won	0	0	0
Seat change	▼3	Did not exist	Steady
Popular vote	9,872	8,833	8,366
Percentage	4.86%	4.35%	4.12%
Swing	▼2.92 pp	Did not exist	▼0.81 pp
Chairman before election
Anatoly Smirnov
United Russia
Elected Chairman
Mikhail Vasyutin
United Russia

The 2024 State Assembly of the Mari El Republic election took place on 6–8 September 2024, on common election day. All 52 seats in the State Assembly were up for reelection.

United Russia retained its majority in the State Assembly, winning 61% of the vote. Liberal Democratic Party of Russia and Communist Party of the Russian Federation suffered heavy losses, while A Just Russia – For Truth lost its entire three-member delegation.

== Electoral system ==
Under current election laws, the State Assembly is elected for a term of five years, with parallel voting. 13 seats are elected by party-list proportional representation with a 5% electoral threshold, with the other half elected in 39 single-member constituencies by first-past-the-post voting. Seats in the proportional part are allocated using the Imperiali quota, modified to ensure that every party list, which passes the threshold, receives at least one mandate.

== Candidates ==
=== Party lists ===
To register regional lists of candidates, parties need to collect 0.5% of signatures of all registered voters in Mari El.

The following parties were relieved from the necessity to collect signatures:

- United Russia
- Communist Party of the Russian Federation
- A Just Russia — Patriots — For Truth
- Liberal Democratic Party of Russia
- New People
- Russian Party of Pensioners for Social Justice
- Communists of Russia

№	Party	Territorial groups' leaders	Candidates	Territorial groups	Status
1	United Russia	Lidia Batyukova • Larisa Revutskaya • Lev Pokrovsky • Konstantin Ivanov • Vasily Bochkarev • Aleksandr Stashkevich • Mikhail Vasyutin • Natalia Labutina • Aleksandr Mayorov • Yevgeny Kuzmin • Vitaly Purtov • Sergey Martynov • Aleksandr Smirnov	65	13	Registered
2	New People	Anton Tselishev • Denis Kravtsov • Dmitry Lvov • Fanis Shigapov • Andrey Gavrilov • Ilya Kulalayev • Andrey Zheludkin • Yulia Druzhinina • Tatyana Volkova • Artyom Pavlovsky • Tatyana Belyakova • Daniil Lebedev • Vitaly Shablovsky	38	13	Registered
3	Liberal Democratic Party	Anton Zinovagin • Yevgeny Koskin • Andrey Yegorov • Yulia Petukhova • Aleksey Sherstobitov • Yevgeny Aleksandrov • Olga Yeroshkina • Yevgeny Bastrakov • Andrey Filashin • Aleksandr Ivanov • Dmitry Loginov • Maksim Chukashov • Ivan Gusev	48	13	Registered
4	Communists of Russia	Sergey Malinkovich • Oleg Kazakov • Margarita Ivanova • Nikolay Ivanov • Ruslan Khugayev • Yury Sushentsov • Ilya Kleymyonov • Yaroslav Sidorov • Lyudmila Savina • Vladimir Grachev • Aleksandr Rakhmanin • Yekaterina Mironova • Ivan Bychkov	39	13	Registered
5	Party of Pensioners	Lyudmila Shipunova • Irena Ardashirova • Valentina Zlobina • Lyudmila Plotnikova • Aleksandr Iglin • Nadezhda Klimina • Vladimir Polevshchikov • Dmitry Ivanov • Yulia Tolstyakova • Aleksandr Petukhov • Aleksandr Tsvetkov • Lalita Yevstratovskaya • Ivan Dmitriyev	39	13	Registered
6	Communist Party	Aleksandr Tumanov • Yelena Grigoryeva • Aleksandr Maslikhin • Sergey Tsaregorodtsev • Aleksandr Bezdenezhnykh • Oksana Ablyazova • Vladimir Kharchenko • Vladislav Zhezlov • Konstantin Terekhov • Andrey Petukhov • Nikolay Sidorkin • Yevgeny Kirillov • Andrey Taratin	52	13	Registered
7	A Just Russia – For Truth	Andrey Zabolotskikh • Ilya Zhukov • Natalia Glushchenko • Boris Gerasimov • Aleksey Ivanov • Robert Salakhutdinov • Raisa Kapitonova • Pyotr Stolyarov • Dmitry Skvortsov • Vladimir Nikolayev • Yelena Bukatina • Yelizaveta Zaytseva • Valery Yakovlev	40	13	Registered

New People took part in Mari El legislative election for the first time.

=== Single-mandate constituencies ===
39 single-mandate constituencies were formed in Mari El. To register candidates in single-mandate constituencies need to collect 3% of signatures of registered voters in the constituency.

Number of candidates in single-mandate constituencies
Party	Candidates	
Party	Nominated	Registered
United Russia	39	39
Communist Party	39	39
Liberal Democratic Party	39	39
A Just Russia – For Truth	38	38
Party of Pensioners	39	39
New People	6	6
Independent	5	1
Total	205	201

== Polls ==
Fieldwork date	Polling firm	UR	CPRF	LDPR	SR-ZP	NL	RPPSS	CPCR
7–8 September 2024	2024 election	61.2	11.6	8.7	4.9	4.4	4.1	3.8
23–30 August 2024	Russian Field	50.2	17.9	13.7	4.2	6.8	4.5	1.4
8 September 2019	2019 election	37.5	26.9	15.8	7.8	–	4.9	4.0

== Results ==
=== Results by party lists ===
Party	Party list					Constituency		Total	
Party	Votes	%	±pp	Seats	+/–	Seats	+/–	Seats	+/–
United Russia	124,378	61.23	▲23.74	10	▲4	38	▲11	48	▲15
Communist Party	23,502	11.57	▼15.35	2	▼2	0	▼5	2	▼7
Liberal Democratic Party	17,577	8.65	▼7.13	1	▼1	0	▼1	1	▼2
A Just Russia — For Truth	9,872	4.86	▼2.92	0	▼1	0	▼2	0	▼3
New People	8,833	4.35	New	0	New	0	New	0	New
Party of Pensioners	8,366	4.12	▼0.81	0	Steady	0	New	0	Steady
Communists of Russia	7,666	3.77	▼0.27	0	Steady	–	–	0	Steady
Independents	–	–	–	–	–	1	▼3	1	▼3
Invalid ballots	2,922	1.44	▼1.62	—	—	—	—	—	—
Total	203,116	100.00	—	13	Steady	39	Steady	52	Steady
Turnout	203,116	38.72	▲3.69	—	—	—	—	—	—
Registered voters	524,617	100.00	—	—	—	—	—	—	—

Former First Deputy Chairman of the Government of the Mari El Republic Mikhail Vasyutin (United Russia) was elected Chairman of the State Assembly, replacing retiring incumbent Chairman Anatoly Smirnov (United Russia). Incumbent Senator Sergey Martynov (United Russia / Independent) was re-appointed to the Federation Council.

=== Results in single-member constituencies ===
==== District 1 ====
Summary of the 6–8 September 2024 State Assembly of the Mari El Republic election in Zarubinsky constituency No.1
Candidate	Party	Votes	%
Igor Petukhov	United Russia	1,796	44.24%
Andrey Zabolotskikh (incumbent)	A Just Russia – For Truth	700	17.24%
Yevgeny Tikhonov	Communist Party	588	14.48%
Anton Zinovagin	Liberal Democratic Party	426	10.49%
Viktor Anuchin	Party of Pensioners	363	8.94%
Total		4,060	100%

==== District 2 ====
Summary of the 6–8 September 2024 State Assembly of the Mari El Republic election in Tsentralny constituency No.2
Candidate	Party	Votes	%
Mikhail Shvetsov (incumbent)	United Russia	2,444	53.87%
Andrey Smyslov	Communist Party	829	18.27%
Konstantin Trapeznikov	Liberal Democratic Party	442	9.74%
Tatyana Makovich	Party of Pensioners	372	8.20%
Anton Nikiforov	A Just Russia – For Truth	296	6.52%
Total		4,537	100%

==== District 3 ====
Summary of the 6–8 September 2024 State Assembly of the Mari El Republic election in Molodyozhny constituency No.3
Candidate	Party	Votes	%
Maksim Bronnikov (incumbent)	United Russia	2,381	53.67%
Andrey Savinov	Communist Party	576	12.98%
Ilya Zhukov	A Just Russia – For Truth	550	12.40%
Vitaly Potekhin	Liberal Democratic Party	415	9.36%
Oleg Kosolapov	New People	217	4.89%
Lyudmila Letuchina	Party of Pensioners	186	4.19%
Total		4,436	100%

==== District 4 ====
Summary of the 6–8 September 2024 State Assembly of the Mari El Republic election in Sombatkheysky constituency No.4
Candidate	Party	Votes	%
Andrey Vinogorov	United Russia	1,815	46.07%
Aleksandr Maslikhin (incumbent)	Communist Party	773	19.62%
Artyom Andreyev	Liberal Democratic Party	581	14.75%
Salikh Shaydullin	A Just Russia – For Truth	397	10.08%
Valentina Zlobina	Party of Pensioners	273	6.93%
Total		3,940	100%

==== District 5 ====
Summary of the 6–8 September 2024 State Assembly of the Mari El Republic election in Zarechny constituency No.5
Candidate	Party	Votes	%
Daniil Zhukov	United Russia	1,566	40.92%
Vladislav Zhezlov (incumbent)	Communist Party	856	22.37%
Nikolay Kilin	Liberal Democratic Party	619	16.17%
Igor Savinov	A Just Russia – For Truth	363	9.49%
Ivan Dudchak	Party of Pensioners	290	7.58%
Total		3,827	100%

==== District 6 ====
Summary of the 6–8 September 2024 State Assembly of the Mari El Republic election in Dubkovsky constituency No.6
Candidate	Party	Votes	%
Renat Magsumov	United Russia	2,060	48.97%
Natalia Glushchenko (incumbent)	A Just Russia – For Truth	1,005	23.89%
Sergey Firsov	Communist Party	523	12.43%
Natalya Pavlova	Liberal Democratic Party	316	7.51%
Lyudmila Shipunova	Party of Pensioners	206	4.90%
Total		4,207	100%

==== District 7 ====
Summary of the 6–8 September 2024 State Assembly of the Mari El Republic election in Remzavodsky constituency No.7
Candidate	Party	Votes	%
Anton Tolstov	United Russia	1,382	33.55%
Yevgeny Kalinkin	A Just Russia – For Truth	1,034	25.10%
Yelena Grigoryeva	Communist Party	735	17.84%
Andrey Yegorov	Liberal Democratic Party	542	13.16%
Dmitry Ivanov	Party of Pensioners	268	6.51%
Total		4,119	100%

==== District 8 ====
Summary of the 6–8 September 2024 State Assembly of the Mari El Republic election in Suvorovsky constituency No.8
Candidate	Party	Votes	%
Dmitry Labutin	United Russia	1,685	43.36%
Dmitry Protasov	Communist Party	663	17.06%
Sergey Yefremov	Liberal Democratic Party	426	10.96%
Anna Gudova	A Just Russia – For Truth	386	9.93%
Valentina Markova	New People	376	9.68%
Galina Tolmacheva	Party of Pensioners	205	5.28%
Total		3,886	100%

==== District 9 ====
Summary of the 6–8 September 2024 State Assembly of the Mari El Republic election in Krasnoarmeysky constituency No.9
Candidate	Party	Votes	%
Aleksey Krasilnikov	United Russia	2,096	59.19%
Maksim Morozov	Communist Party	606	17.11%
Vladimir Ryabchikov	Liberal Democratic Party	422	11.92%
Vasily Popov	Party of Pensioners	280	7.91%
Total		3,541	100%

==== District 10 ====
Summary of the 6–8 September 2024 State Assembly of the Mari El Republic election in Antsiferovsky constituency No.10
Candidate	Party	Votes	%
Andrey Bakhmatov (incumbent)	United Russia	1,750	47.34%
Sergey Shcheglov	Communist Party	566	15.31%
Yevgeny Koskin	Liberal Democratic Party	510	13.79%
Nadezhda Yermakova	A Just Russia – For Truth	492	13.31%
Valentina Shvalyova	Party of Pensioners	274	7.41%
Total		3,697	100%

==== District 11 ====
Summary of the 6–8 September 2024 State Assembly of the Mari El Republic election in Gomzovsky constituency No.11
Candidate	Party	Votes	%
Maksim Belousov	United Russia	1,493	41.58%
Sergey Tsaregorodtsev (incumbent)	Communist Party	806	22.45%
Yulia Petukhova	Liberal Democratic Party	534	14.87%
Vladimir Shabalin	A Just Russia – For Truth	448	12.48%
Aleksandr Tsvetkov	Party of Pensioners	190	5.29%
Total		3,591	100%

==== District 12 ====
Summary of the 6–8 September 2024 State Assembly of the Mari El Republic election in Berezovsky constituency No.12
Candidate	Party	Votes	%
Dmitry Gruzdev	United Russia	2,017	48.28%
Boris Gerasimov	A Just Russia – For Truth	829	19.84%
Aleksey Dozhdikov	Communist Party	594	14.22%
Alina Tanygina	Liberal Democratic Party	423	10.12%
Olga Dvoretskaya	Party of Pensioners	202	4.83%
Total		4,178	100%

==== District 13 ====
Summary of the 6–8 September 2024 State Assembly of the Mari El Republic election in Stroitelny constituency No.13
Candidate	Party	Votes	%
Maria Dorogova	United Russia	1,355	36.39%
Albert Fedorov	Liberal Democratic Party	904	24.27%
Andrey Ponomarev (incumbent)	Communist Party	566	15.20%
Irina Baranova	A Just Russia – For Truth	540	14.50%
Aleksandr Iglin	Party of Pensioners	256	6.87%
Total		3,724	100%

==== District 14 ====
Summary of the 6–8 September 2024 State Assembly of the Mari El Republic election in Prokhorovsky constituency No.14
Candidate	Party	Votes	%
Grigory Peysakhovich (incumbent)	United Russia	2,225	52.54%
Aleksey Sherstobitov	Liberal Democratic Party	699	16.51%
Aslan Gumbatov	Communist Party	514	12.14%
Sergey Kudryavtsev	A Just Russia – For Truth	431	10.18%
Lyudmila Fedorova	Party of Pensioners	227	5.36%
Total		4,235	100%

==== District 15 ====
Summary of the 6–8 September 2024 State Assembly of the Mari El Republic election in Gagarinsky constituency No.15
Candidate	Party	Votes	%
Marina Yankovskaya	United Russia	2,518	56.06%
Robert Salakhutdinov	A Just Russia – For Truth	735	16.36%
Nikolay Semyonov	Communist Party	685	15.25%
Yevgeny Aleksandrov	Liberal Democratic Party	266	5.92%
Andrey Gavrilov	New People	87	1.94%
Sergey Arsentyev	Party of Pensioners	73	1.63%
Total		4,492	100%

==== District 16 ====
Summary of the 6–8 September 2024 State Assembly of the Mari El Republic election in Nagorny constituency No.16
Candidate	Party	Votes	%
David Pogosyan	United Russia	2,155	52.32%
Oksana Ablyazova	Communist Party	765	18.57%
Dmitry Kozin	A Just Russia – For Truth	440	10.68%
Nadezhda Klimina	Party of Pensioners	338	8.21%
Dmitry Golubin	Liberal Democratic Party	155	3.76%
Ilya Kulalayev	New People	137	3.33%
Total		4,119	100%

==== District 17 ====
Summary of the 6–8 September 2024 State Assembly of the Mari El Republic election in Zavodskoy constituency No.17
Candidate	Party	Votes	%
Ildar Ibragimov	United Russia	2,365	67.24%
Sergey Rybakov	Communist Party	548	15.58%
Georgy Moiseyev	A Just Russia – For Truth	198	5.63%
Olga Karlovskaya	Party of Pensioners	164	4.66%
Kirill Shabdarov	Liberal Democratic Party	138	3.92%
Total		3,517	100%

==== District 18 ====
Summary of the 6–8 September 2024 State Assembly of the Mari El Republic election in Kozmodemyansky constituency No.18
Candidate	Party	Votes	%
Svetlana Gromova (incumbent)	United Russia	2,456	58.70%
Olga Yeroshkina	Liberal Democratic Party	685	16.37%
Vladimir Kharchenko	Communist Party	513	12.26%
Sergey Nikitin	A Just Russia – For Truth	221	5.28%
Vladimir Polevshchikov	Party of Pensioners	193	4.61%
Total		4,184	100%

==== District 19 ====
Summary of the 6–8 September 2024 State Assembly of the Mari El Republic election in Povolzhsky constituency No.19
Candidate	Party	Votes	%
Mikhail Rodionov (incumbent)	United Russia	2,518	49.42%
Aleksey Postvaykin	Communist Party	1,434	28.15%
Natalya Kolupayeva	Liberal Democratic Party	497	9.75%
Nadezhda Vedernikova	Party of Pensioners	345	6.77%
Anastasia Guryanova	A Just Russia – For Truth	221	4.34%
Total		5,095	100%

==== District 20 ====
Summary of the 6–8 September 2024 State Assembly of the Mari El Republic election in Gornomariysky constituency No.20
Candidate	Party	Votes	%
Vasily Arisov	Independent	3,591	55.09%
Sergey Ilyin	United Russia	2,236	34.30%
Aleksandr Sidorkin	Liberal Democratic Party	212	3.25%
Raisa Kapitonova	A Just Russia – For Truth	184	2.82%
Gennady Zubkov	Communist Party	178	2.73%
Natalia Krasilnikova	Party of Pensioners	48	0.74%
Total		6,519	100%

==== District 21 ====
Summary of the 6–8 September 2024 State Assembly of the Mari El Republic election in Volzhsky constituency No.21
Candidate	Party	Votes	%
Larisa Yakovleva (incumbent)	United Russia	4,780	70.84%
Stanislav Petrov	Communist Party	1,118	16.57%
Anna Petrova	A Just Russia – For Truth	408	6.05%
Dmitry Strelnikov	Liberal Democratic Party	236	3.50%
Yulia Protasova	Party of Pensioners	127	1.88%
Total		6,748	100%

==== District 22 ====
Summary of the 6–8 September 2024 State Assembly of the Mari El Republic election in Krasnogorsky constituency No.22
Candidate	Party	Votes	%
Nina Yangelova	United Russia	3,500	58.64%
Valery Shumilov	Communist Party	770	12.90%
Yevgeny Bastrakov	Liberal Democratic Party	732	12.26%
Svetlana Sobolevskaya	A Just Russia – For Truth	447	7.49%
Margarita Veselova	Party of Pensioners	280	4.69%
Yulia Druzhinina	New People	135	2.26%
Total		5,969	100%

==== District 23 ====
Summary of the 6–8 September 2024 State Assembly of the Mari El Republic election in Zvenigovsky constituency No.23
Candidate	Party	Votes	%
Fevzi Kerimov (incumbent)	United Russia	3,817	76.79%
Pyotr Stolyarov	A Just Russia – For Truth	454	9.13%
Erik Alekseyev	Communist Party	388	7.81%
Vera Novokshonova	Party of Pensioners	183	3.68%
Veronika Shaykhullina	Liberal Democratic Party	80	1.61%
Total		4,971	100%

==== District 24 ====
Summary of the 6–8 September 2024 State Assembly of the Mari El Republic election in Sosnovy constituency No.24
Candidate	Party	Votes	%
Natalya Kozlova (incumbent)	United Russia	2,885	54.27%
Aleksandr Filippov	Communist Party	979	18.42%
Oleg Bakutov	A Just Russia – For Truth	590	11.10%
Olesya Viktorova	Liberal Democratic Party	402	7.56%
Galina Likhacheva	Party of Pensioners	372	7.00%
Total		5,316	100%

==== District 25 ====
Summary of the 6–8 September 2024 State Assembly of the Mari El Republic election in Zapadny constituency No.25
Candidate	Party	Votes	%
Aleksandr Pavlov	United Russia	5,811	70.80%
Nikolay Kalayev	Communist Party	1,181	14.39%
Dmitry Skvortsov	A Just Russia – For Truth	638	7.77%
Valentin Tikhonravov	Liberal Democratic Party	335	4.08%
Tatyana Semerova	Party of Pensioners	190	2.31%
Total		8,208	100%

==== District 26 ====
Summary of the 6–8 September 2024 State Assembly of the Mari El Republic election in Kuzhenersky constituency No.26
Candidate	Party	Votes	%
Sergey Belousov (incumbent)	United Russia	6,618	81.49%
Boris Rusinov	Communist Party	568	6.99%
Larisa Kalsina	Liberal Democratic Party	468	5.76%
Valery Yakovlev	A Just Russia – For Truth	242	2.98%
Aleksey Tselishchev	Party of Pensioners	148	1.82%
Total		8,121	100%

==== District 27 ====
Summary of the 6–8 September 2024 State Assembly of the Mari El Republic election in Mari-Tureksky constituency No.27
Candidate	Party	Votes	%
Dmitry Sergeyev (incumbent)	United Russia	4,015	58.79%
Yevgeny Kirillov	Communist Party	1,817	26.61%
Zemfira Galich	Liberal Democratic Party	413	6.05%
Yelizaveta Zaytseva	A Just Russia – For Truth	279	4.09%
Lalita Yevstratovskaya	Party of Pensioners	199	2.91%
Total		6,829	100%

==== District 28 ====
Summary of the 6–8 September 2024 State Assembly of the Mari El Republic election in Medvedevsky constituency No.28
Candidate	Party	Votes	%
Aleksey Kiselyov (incumbent)	United Russia	2,032	46.12%
Aleksandr Bezdenezhnykh	Communist Party	916	20.79%
Vera Artyushova	Party of Pensioners	550	12.48%
Yekaterina Mochalova	Liberal Democratic Party	458	10.39%
Aleksey Ivanov	A Just Russia – For Truth	387	8.78%
Total		4,406	100%

==== District 29 ====
Summary of the 6–8 September 2024 State Assembly of the Mari El Republic election in Lesnoy constituency No.29
Candidate	Party	Votes	%
Ruslan Mutaliyev	United Russia	2,457	48.88%
Konstantin Terekhov	Communist Party	697	13.87%
Ilya Fedorov	Liberal Democratic Party	581	11.56%
Yulia Korolyova	A Just Russia – For Truth	531	10.56%
Natalya Kreneva	Party of Pensioners	315	6.27%
Total		5,027	100%

==== District 30 ====
Summary of the 6–8 September 2024 State Assembly of the Mari El Republic election in Prigorodny constituency No.30
Candidate	Party	Votes	%
Aleksandr Bannikov	United Russia	4,744	64.80%
Sergey Derevyashkin	Communist Party	1,209	16.51%
Dmitry Yasnovsky	Liberal Democratic Party	531	7.25%
Oleg Belov	Party of Pensioners	513	7.01%
Aleksandr Solovyev	A Just Russia – For Truth	273	3.73%
Total		7,321	100%

==== District 31 ====
Summary of the 6–8 September 2024 State Assembly of the Mari El Republic election in Krasnooktyabrsky constituency No.31
Candidate	Party	Votes	%
Aleksey Komelin	United Russia	3,294	64.63%
Gennady Vorontsov	Communist Party	692	13.58%
Andrey Filashin	Liberal Democratic Party	492	9.65%
Yelena Vorobyeva	A Just Russia – For Truth	360	7.06%
Yulia Tolstyakova	Party of Pensioners	208	4.08%
Total		5,097	100%

==== District 32 ====
Summary of the 6–8 September 2024 State Assembly of the Mari El Republic election in Morkinsky constituency No.32
Candidate	Party	Votes	%
Natalya Pushkina	United Russia	2,344	58.61%
Andrey Petukhov	Communist Party	926	23.16%
Aleksandr Ivanov	Liberal Democratic Party	322	8.05%
Aleksandr Petukhov	Party of Pensioners	157	3.93%
Sergey Vasilyev	A Just Russia – For Truth	122	3.05%
Artyom Pavlovsky	New People	71	1.78%
Total		3,999	100%

==== District 33 ====
Summary of the 6–8 September 2024 State Assembly of the Mari El Republic election in Lugovoy constituency No.33
Candidate	Party	Votes	%
Yury Ignatyev (incumbent)	United Russia	4,209	74.69%
Vitaly Stepanov	Communist Party	587	10.42%
Yekaterina Vorontsova	Liberal Democratic Party	342	6.07%
Zukhra Osipova	A Just Russia – For Truth	317	5.63%
Valentina Maslennikova	Party of Pensioners	105	1.86%
Total		5,635	100%

==== District 34 ====
Summary of the 6–8 September 2024 State Assembly of the Mari El Republic election in Novotoryalsky constituency No.34
Candidate	Party	Votes	%
Arkady Novikov (incumbent)	United Russia	5,079	81.96%
Nikolay Sidorkin	Communist Party	591	11.15%
Vladimir Unzhenin	Liberal Democratic Party	131	2.11%
Yelena Bukatina	A Just Russia – For Truth	119	1.92%
Svetlana Popova	Party of Pensioners	103	1.66%
Total		6,197	100%

==== District 35 ====
Summary of the 6–8 September 2024 State Assembly of the Mari El Republic election in Orshansky constituency No.35
Candidate	Party	Votes	%
Yevgeny Kozyrev	United Russia	4,545	68.97%
Pyotr Nikolayev	Communist Party	859	13.03%
Dmitry Loginov	Liberal Democratic Party	559	8.48%
Andrey Lyamin	A Just Russia – For Truth	275	4.17%
Valentina Rassanova	Party of Pensioners	235	3.57%
Total		6,590	100%

==== District 36 ====
Summary of the 6–8 September 2024 State Assembly of the Mari El Republic election in Paranginsky constituency No.36
Candidate	Party	Votes	%
Aleksandr Pavlov (incumbent)	United Russia	5,865	76.79%
Rinat Safin	Communist Party	1,163	15.23%
Ilnur Siraziyev	Liberal Democratic Party	212	2.78%
Linar Akhmetzyanov	A Just Russia – For Truth	185	2.42%
Farida Safina	Party of Pensioners	144	1.89%
Total		7,638	100%

==== District 37 ====
Summary of the 6–8 September 2024 State Assembly of the Mari El Republic election in Sernursky constituency No.37
Candidate	Party	Votes	%
Vladimir Kozhanov (incumbent)	United Russia	6,792	78.20%
Dmitry Shvalev	Communist Party	756	8.70%
Maksim Chukashov	Liberal Democratic Party	638	7.35%
Grigory Petrov-Chotkar	A Just Russia – For Truth	246	2.83%
Lyudmila Ozhiganova	Party of Pensioners	213	2.45%
Total		8,685	100%

==== District 38 ====
Summary of the 6–8 September 2024 State Assembly of the Mari El Republic election in Sovetsky constituency No.38
Candidate	Party	Votes	%
Dmitry Glazyrin	United Russia	3,945	68.31%
Ivan Gusev	Liberal Democratic Party	767	13.28%
Andrey Taratin	Communist Party	597	10.34%
Maria Ivanova	Party of Pensioners	229	3.97%
Aleksey Yegorov	A Just Russia – For Truth	171	2.96%
Total		5,775	100%

==== District 39 ====
Summary of the 6–8 September 2024 State Assembly of the Mari El Republic election in Ronginsky constituency No.39
Candidate	Party	Votes	%
Nadezhda Bogachuk (incumbent)	United Russia	3,928	68.24%
Albert Vasilyev	Communist Party	674	11.71%
Dmitry Badyin	Liberal Democratic Party	543	9.43%
Tatyana Dobrovolskaya	A Just Russia – For Truth	312	5.42%
Ivan Dmitriyev	Party of Pensioners	242	4.20%
Total		5,756	100%

=== Members ===
Incumbent deputies are highlighted with bold, elected members who declined to take a seat are marked with ~~strikethrough~~.

Constituency
No.	Member	Party
1	Igor Petukhov	United Russia
2	Mikhail Shvetsov	United Russia
3	Maksim Bronnikov	United Russia
4	Andrey Vinogorov	United Russia
5	Daniil Zhukov	United Russia
6	Renat Magsumov	United Russia
7	Anton Tolstov	United Russia
8	Dmitry Labutin	United Russia
9	Aleksey Krasilnikov	United Russia
10	Andrey Bakhmatov	United Russia
11	Maksim Belousov	United Russia
12	Dmitry Gruzdev	United Russia
13	Maria Dorogova	United Russia
14	Grigory Peysakhovich	United Russia
15	Marina Yankovskaya	United Russia
16	David Pogosyan	United Russia
17	Ildar Ibragimov	United Russia
18	Svetlana Gromova	United Russia
19	Mikhail Rodionov	United Russia
20	Vasily Arisov	Independent
21	Larisa Yakovleva	United Russia
22	Nina Yangelova	United Russia
23	Fevzi Kerimov	United Russia
24	Natalya Kozlova	United Russia
25	Aleksandr Pavlov	United Russia
26	Sergey Belousov	United Russia
27	Dmitry Sergeyev	United Russia
28	Aleksey Kiselyov	United Russia
29	Ruslan Mutaliyev	United Russia
30	Aleksandr Bannikov	United Russia
31	Aleksey Komelin	United Russia
32	Natalya Pushkina	United Russia
33	Yury Ignatyev	United Russia
34	Arkady Novikov	United Russia
35	Yevgeny Kozyrev	United Russia
36	Aleksandr Pavlov	United Russia
37	Vladimir Kozhanov	United Russia
38	Dmitry Glazyrin	United Russia
39	Nadezhda Bogachuk	United Russia

Party lists
Member	Party
~~Lidia Batyukova~~	United Russia
~~Anton Volkov~~	United Russia
~~Larisa Revutskaya~~	United Russia
~~Yevgenia Glushkova~~	United Russia
~~Lev Pokrovsky~~	United Russia
Boris Saldayev	United Russia
~~Konstantin Ivanov~~	United Russia
~~Andrey Sidorkin~~	United Russia
Vasily Bochkarev	United Russia
Aleksandr Stashkevich	United Russia
Mikhail Vasyutin	United Russia
~~Natalia Labutina~~	United Russia
Eduard Aleksandrov	United Russia
Aleksandr Mayorov	United Russia
~~Yevgeny Kuzmin~~	United Russia
Eduard Imanayev	United Russia
Vitaly Purtov	United Russia
Sergey Martynov	United Russia
Aleksandr Smirnov	United Russia
Aleksandr Tumanov	Communist Party
Oksana Ablyazova	Communist Party
Aleksey Sherstobitov	Liberal Democratic Party

== See also ==
- 2024 Russian elections
