= Tanya Savicheva =

Russian diarist and victim of the Siege of Leningrad

- Таня Савичева
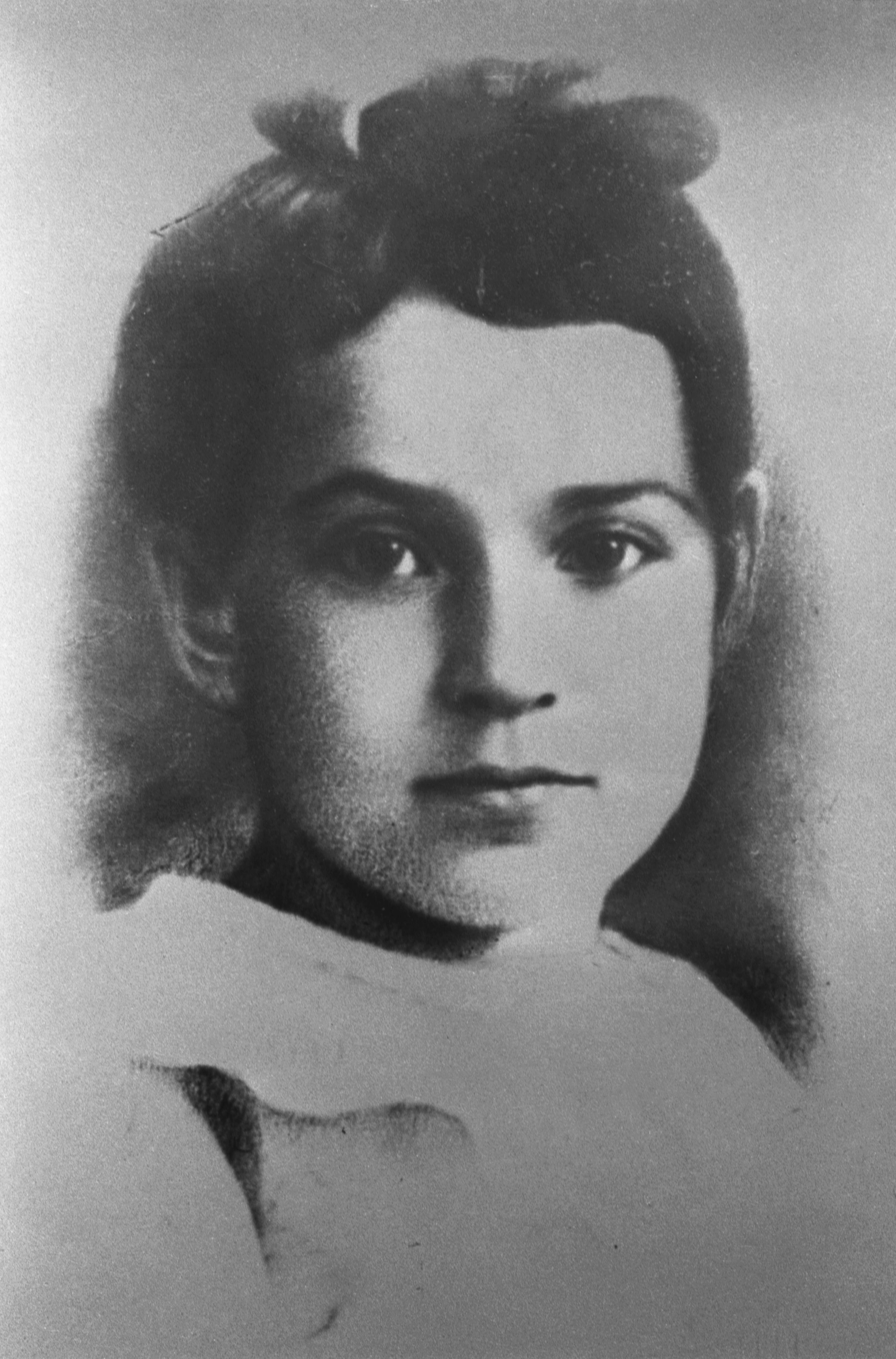
- Savicheva in 1936
- Born: Tatyana Nikolayevna Savicheva; 23 January 1930; Dvorishche, Gdovsky District, Leningrad Oblast, Russian SFSR, Soviet Union (modern-day Pskov Oblast, Russia)
- Died: 1 July 1944 (aged 14); Gorky Oblast, Russian SFSR, Soviet Union (modern-day Nizhny Novgorod Oblast, Russia)
- Cause of death: Intestinal tuberculosis
- Resting place: Krasny Bor cemetery, Shatki, Nizhny Novgorod, Russia

Tatyana Nikolayevna Savicheva (Russian: Татьяна Николаевна Савичева), commonly referred to as Tanya Savicheva (Таня Савичева; 23 January 1930 – 1 July 1944), was a Soviet Russian teenage diarist who wrote a diary for several months, whilst enduring the siege of Leningrad during World War II. During the siege, Savicheva wrote the successive and unfortunate deaths of each member of her family from starvation and diseases such as dysentery and dystrophy over four and a half months in her diary, with the last family member to die being her mother, Mariya, on 13 May 1942. After her mother died, Tanya Savicheva wrote her final diary entry: The Savichevs are dead. Everyone is dead. Only Tanya is left (Савичевы умерли. Умерли все. Осталась одна Таня). Savicheva was evacuated from the besieged Leningrad and sent to live in an orphanage (and later a hospital when her health rapidly deteriorated), she eventually died from tuberculosis on 1 July 1944, at the age of 14, in Gorky Oblast (now Nizhny Novgorod Oblast), Russian SFSR, Soviet Union (in modern-day Russia).

Savicheva's image and the pages from her diary became symbolic of the human cost of the siege of Leningrad, and she is remembered in Saint Petersburg with a memorial complex on the Green Belt of Glory along the Road of Life. Her diary is speculated to have been used during the Nuremberg trials as evidence of the Nazis’ crimes, although this speculation is probably false, as her diary probably would not have left the archives of the Nuremberg trials.

== Early life ==
Savicheva was born on 23 January 1930, (Note: Some authors list 25 January as being Savicheva's birth date.) the youngest child in the family of a baker father, Nikolay Rodionovich Savichev, and a seamstress mother, Mariya Ignatievna Savicheva. Her father died when Tanya was six, leaving his widow with five children: three girls — Tanya, Zhenya (Yevgenia) and Nina — and two boys — Mikhail and Leka (Leonid). Mikhail had left Leningrad before war broke out. Whilst in German-occupied territory at Kingisepp Mikhail had joined the partisans. Mikhail's story was not known to the rest of his family who presumed him to be dead.

The family planned to spend the summer of 1941 in the countryside, but the Axis invasion of the Soviet Union on 22 June disrupted their plans. All, except Mikhail (Misha), who had already left, decided to stay in Leningrad. Each of them worked to support the army: Mariya Ignatievna sewed uniforms, Leka worked as a plane operator in the Admiralty, Zhenya worked at the munitions factory, Nina helped in the construction of city defences and worked at the munitions factory with her sister, and her uncles Vasya and Lesha served in the anti-aircraft defence. Tanya, then 11 years old, dug trenches and put out firebombs. One day Nina went to work and never came back; she was sent to Lake Ladoga and then urgently evacuated. The family was unaware of this and presumed she had died.

== Origins of the diary ==
Tanya had kept a real diary in previous months. This diary had been a large, thick notebook in which she recorded her day-to-day life, but the family had decided to burn it at some point early on in the siege when there was no fuel left to heat the stove. Some time after the burning of her diary Savicheva was given a small notebook that had belonged to her sister Nina, which would later become her diary. The smaller notebook had been spared the fire and Nina had used it to make notes about the boiler equipment in the plant where she worked. Nina had not used the alphabetised portion of the notebook.

Tanya wrote her first entry in the diary on or shortly after 28 December. This first entry concerned the death of her elder sister Zhenya, which most likely occurred due to severe malnutrition exacerbated by her work at the munitions factory. Zhenya was born in 1909 and had left the family home when she married and had moved to Mokhovaya Street, where she continued to live after her divorce. Zhenya would regularly walk 7 kilometers (4 miles) to the factory where she worked sometimes two shifts a day making mine cases. After work she would donate blood. At this point during the siege of Leningrad, food rationing had been reduced to starvation level, and only small but inadequate supplies were coming into Leningrad across Lake Ladoga along the Road of Life. It is estimated 100,000 people per month were dying from starvation, rations for an adult having been set at 250g (9 oz) of rye bread or half that for children and the elderly. Her weakened body was not strong enough to stand the blood donations and she died in her apartment, from complications resulting from exhaustion and malnutrition, in the arms of her sister Nina who had been worried when she had not turned up for her shift at the factory and had hurried round to Mokhovaya Street to check on her.

== Deaths ==
Savicheva began to record the deaths of each family member in her half empty work notebook. Each page had a letter heading; Savicheva chose the page headed by the Cyrillic letter Ж and recorded the death of her sister with the following statement written probably in blue pencil, in large handwriting which filled the page, "Zhenya died on December 28th at 12 noon, 1941."

From here on, most of Tanya's family also died in quick succession. Her grandmother, Yevdokiya Grigorievna, died a month later, two days after Savicheva's twelfth birthday, of heart failure, having lost a third of her body weight. Yevdokiya Grigorievna refused to go to hospital as she felt the hospitals were overrun enough already. She was buried in a mass grave in what is today's Piskaryovskoye Memorial Cemetery, where there is a memorial complex to the victims of the siege. Savicheva recorded her death under the page heading for the letter Б with the words "Grandma died on the 25th of January at 3 o'clock, 1942."

Tanya later admitted that at the behest of their grandmother they postponed the burial and kept Yevdokiya's ration card until the end of the month; thus, the official date of her death was recorded as 1 February 1942.

On 28 February, Nina disappeared. On the day of her disappearance Leningrad had come under heavy artillery fire and the remaining family presumed her to be dead. In fact Nina Savicheva had been evacuated without warning across Lake Ladoga on the dangerous Road of Life ice route. Nina had no opportunity to send word to any of her relatives, the ice route being reserved only for essential food, fuel, medicine and evacuation purposes. She remained ill for several months and was not able to return to Leningrad to find out what had happened to her family until 1945. Savicheva made no reference to Nina in the notebook. It was Nina who eventually found the diary on returning to Leningrad.

Grandmother's death was followed by Savicheva's brother Leka in March 1942. He had tried earlier in the war to enlist in the military but had been turned down because of nearsightedness. Leka had become a promising engineer, and was also a talented musician. He worked long shifts at the Admiralty Shipyard, often working a second shift into the night. He died in the shipyard's hospital on 17 March, Savicheva hurriedly recording this in her diary under the letter Л, "Leka died March 17th at 5 o'clock in the morning, 1942."

On 13 April, Uncle Vasya (one of her father's brothers) died at the age of 56. Before the war three of Savicheva's uncles lived together in a nearby apartment but when the siege began the family moved in together. Uncle Vasya had served in the First World War but had been refused this time around on account of his age. Vasya and Tanya were said to be very close and Tanya spent many hours in Vasya's apartment which was filled with books. Savicheva recorded his death under the letter В, mixing up some of her grammar, with the words "Uncle Vasya died on April 13th at 2 o'clock in the morning, 1942."

The death of her eldest uncle Lesha followed in May at the age of 71 from malnutrition. He too had tried to enlist in the military but was refused, being too old. Despite his age he remained active in the civilian effort in Leningrad. Savicheva recorded his death on the facing page of the letter Л and left off the word 'died'. "Uncle Lesha May 10th, at 4 o'clock in the afternoon, 1942"

Finally her mother died on the morning of 13 May 1942. Mariya Ignatievna Savicheva was born in 1889 and worked as a seamstress, which she continued during the civilian war effort by sewing soldiers' uniforms. Mariya had loved music and encouraged all her children to play in a family ensemble. Savicheva recorded her death under the letter М, again making grammatical errors and missing the word 'died': "Mama on May 13th at 7:30 in the morning, 1942." Following the death of her mother it seems Savicheva lost hope and under three more letters: С, У and О she filled three more pages with the words

«Савичевы умерли»

«Умерли все»

«Осталась одна Таня»

"The Savichevs are dead." "Everyone is dead." "Only Tanya is left."

== After her rescue ==
After the death of her mother, Savicheva stayed with a neighbour the next night and then, although severely weakened, took the family's personal belongings to the house of her aunt Evdokiya (Dusya). Her aunt, hoping Savicheva might receive urgent medical care, then transferred custody of Savicheva to public orphanage number 48 in the Smolny area of St. Petersburg. In August 1942, Tanya was one of the 140 children who were rescued from Leningrad and brought to the village of Krasny Bor. Anastasiya Karpova, a teacher in the Krasny Bor orphanage, wrote to Tanya's brother Mikhail, who happened to be outside of Leningrad in 1941: "Tanya is now alive, but she doesn't look healthy. A doctor, who visited her recently, says she is very ill. She needs rest, special care, nutrition, better climate and, most of all, tender motherly care." In May 1944, Tanya was sent to a hospital in Shatki, where she died a month later, on 1 July, of intestinal tuberculosis.

Nina Savicheva and Mikhail Savichev returned to Leningrad after World War II. Mikhail had continued fighting until 1944, sustaining injuries which led to him being discharged and transported back to Leningrad. Tanya's diary is now displayed at the Museum of Leningrad History, with a copy also on display at the Piskaryovskoye Memorial Cemetery.

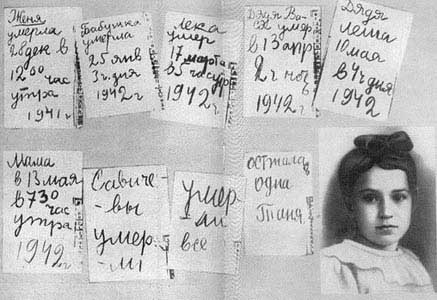
The diary is on display in St. Petersburg, in the Museum of Leningrad History

According to several sources, one of the documents presented by the Allied prosecutors during the Nuremberg trials was the small notebook that once belonged to Tanya.

== Contents of the diary ==
Женя умерла 28 дек в 12 30 час утра 1941 г (Zhenya died on December 28th at 12 noon, 1941)

Бабушка умерла 25 янв 3 ч. дня 1942 г (Grandmother died on the 25th of January at 3 o'clock, 1942)

Лека умер 17 марта в 5 час утр 1942 г. (Leka died March 17th at 5 o'clock in the morning, 1942)

Дядя Вася умер 13 апр 2 ч ночь 1942 г (Uncle Vasya died on April 13th at 2 o'clock in the morning, 1942)

Дядя Леша 10 мая в 4 ч дня 1942 (Uncle Lesha May 10th, at 4 o'clock in the afternoon, 1942)

Мама 13 мая в 7 30 час утра 1942 г (Mom on May 13 at 7:30 in the morning, 1942)

Савичевы умерли (The Savichevs are dead)

Умерли все (Everyone is dead)

Осталась одна Таня (Only Tanya is left)

== Legacy ==
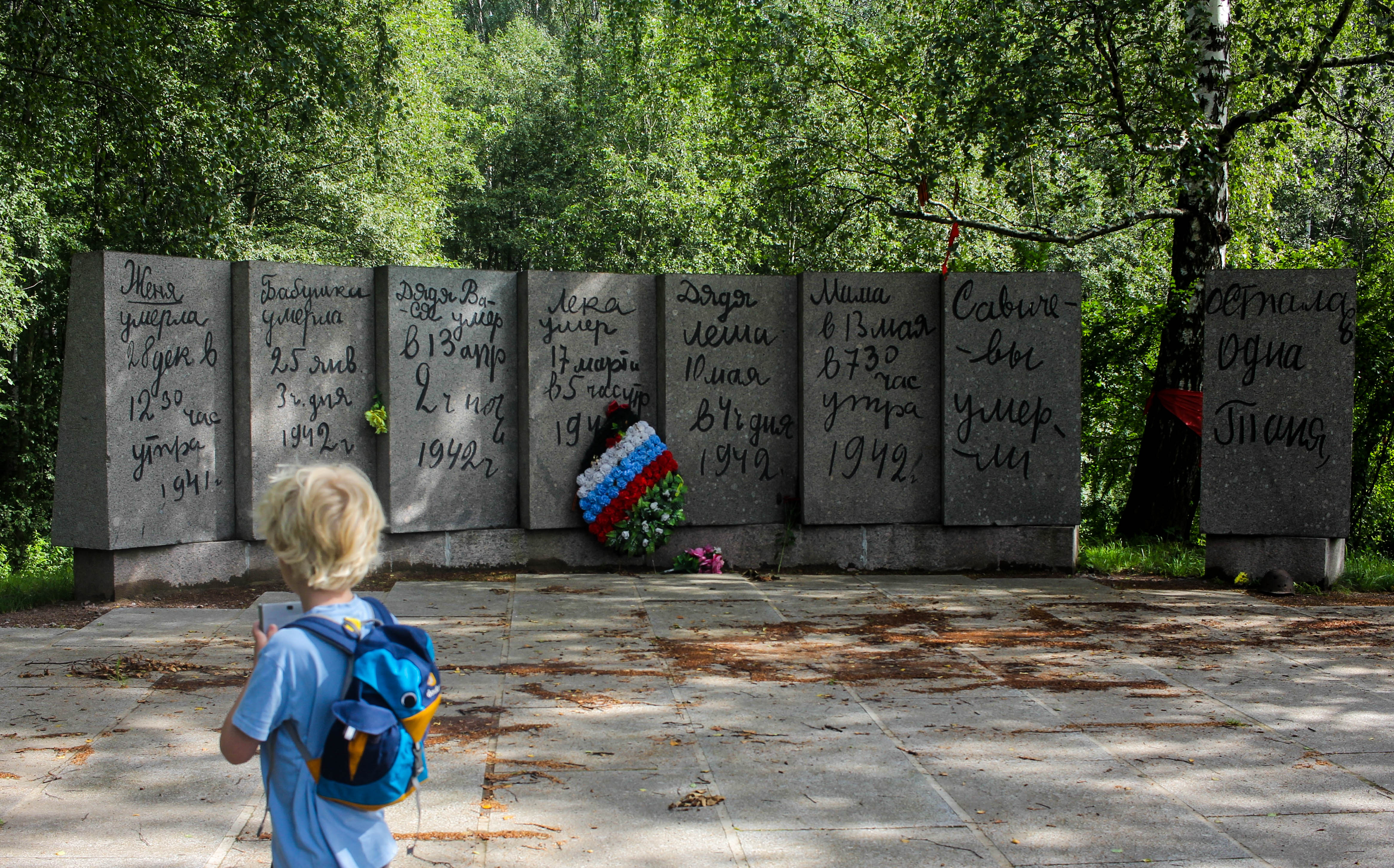
Part of the 'Flower of Life' memorial complex dedicated to children of the Leningrad Siege, showing pages from Savicheva's diary.

Tanya and her diary have become an iconic image of the victims of the siege of Leningrad in the postwar Soviet Union. In 1968 a memorial was constructed in her honor which was later expanded to a memorial complex. The memorial complex, known as "The Flower of Life" («Цветок жизни») consists of a large stone flower designed by A.D. Levyenkov and P.I. Melnikov and eight stone tablets representing pages of her diary where she writes of the members of her family who died, designed by Levyenkov, G.G. Fetisov, and engineer M.V. Koman. It is located on the Green Belt of Glory near St. Petersburg. The memorial is dedicated to children who endured the siege of Leningrad.

At Krasny Bor cemetery where Savicheva is buried there is a red marble tomb with a grey marble grave stone depicting her image in bas relief, sculpted by T. Holueva. Close by is a tall stele with a monumental wall depicting carved pages from her diary.

Serbian poet Mika Antić penned a poem dedicated to Tanya Savicheva named "A lost rendez-vous".

2127 Tanya, a minor planet discovered in 1971 by Soviet astronomer Lyudmila Chernykh, is named in her honor.

There is also a mountain pass named after her in the Dzungarian Alatau mountain range which lies between Kazakhstan and China.

There are memorial plaques on the wall and in the courtyard of her home on Vasilievsky Island, St. Petersburg, and a museum housed in the school she attended.

Copies of the diary have been displayed in exhibitions around the world and the original is displayed at The State Museum of the History of St. Petersburg at Peter and Paul Fortress in St. Petersburg.

== Gallery ==
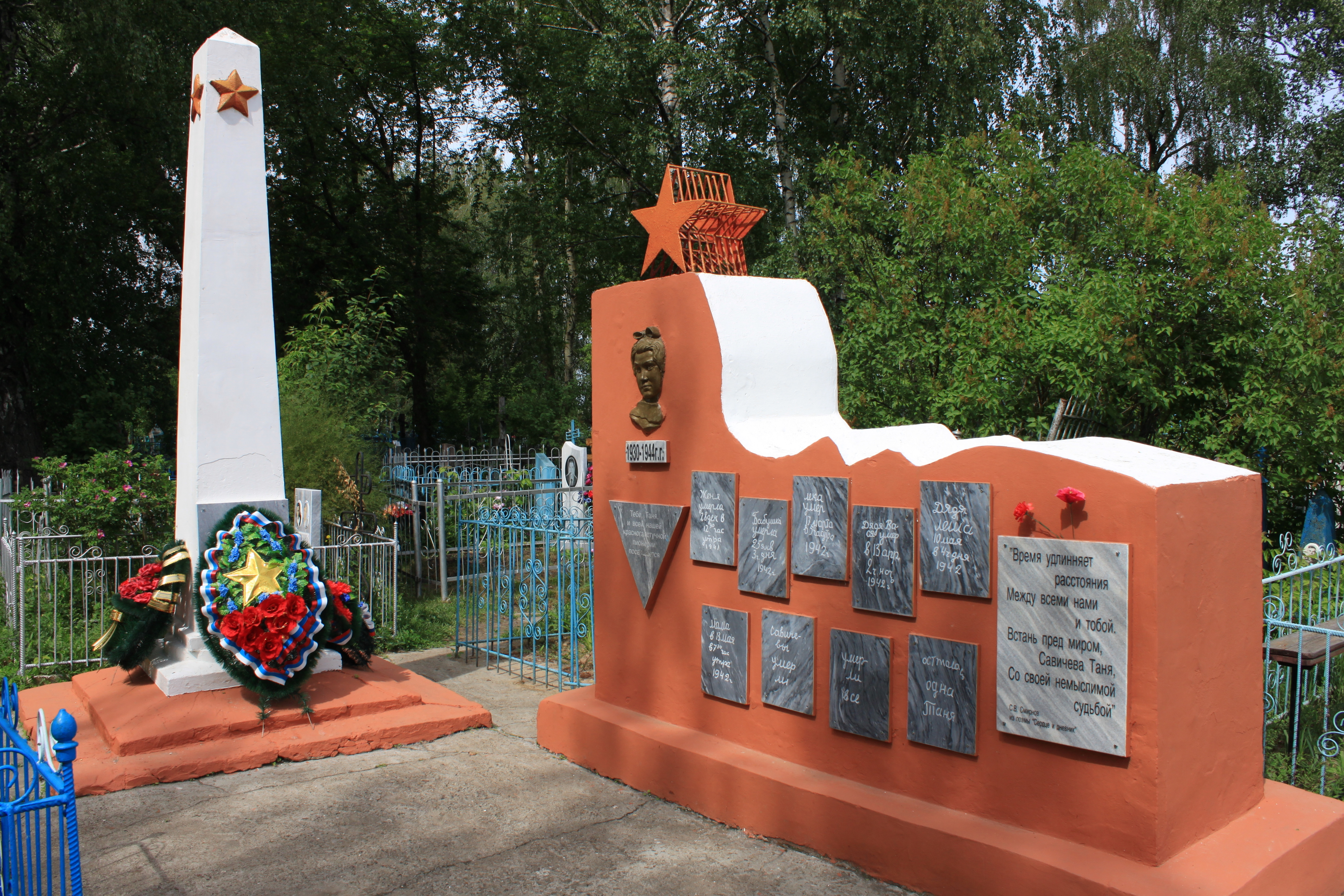
Stele and commemorative wall in memory of Tanya Savicheva at Krasny Bor

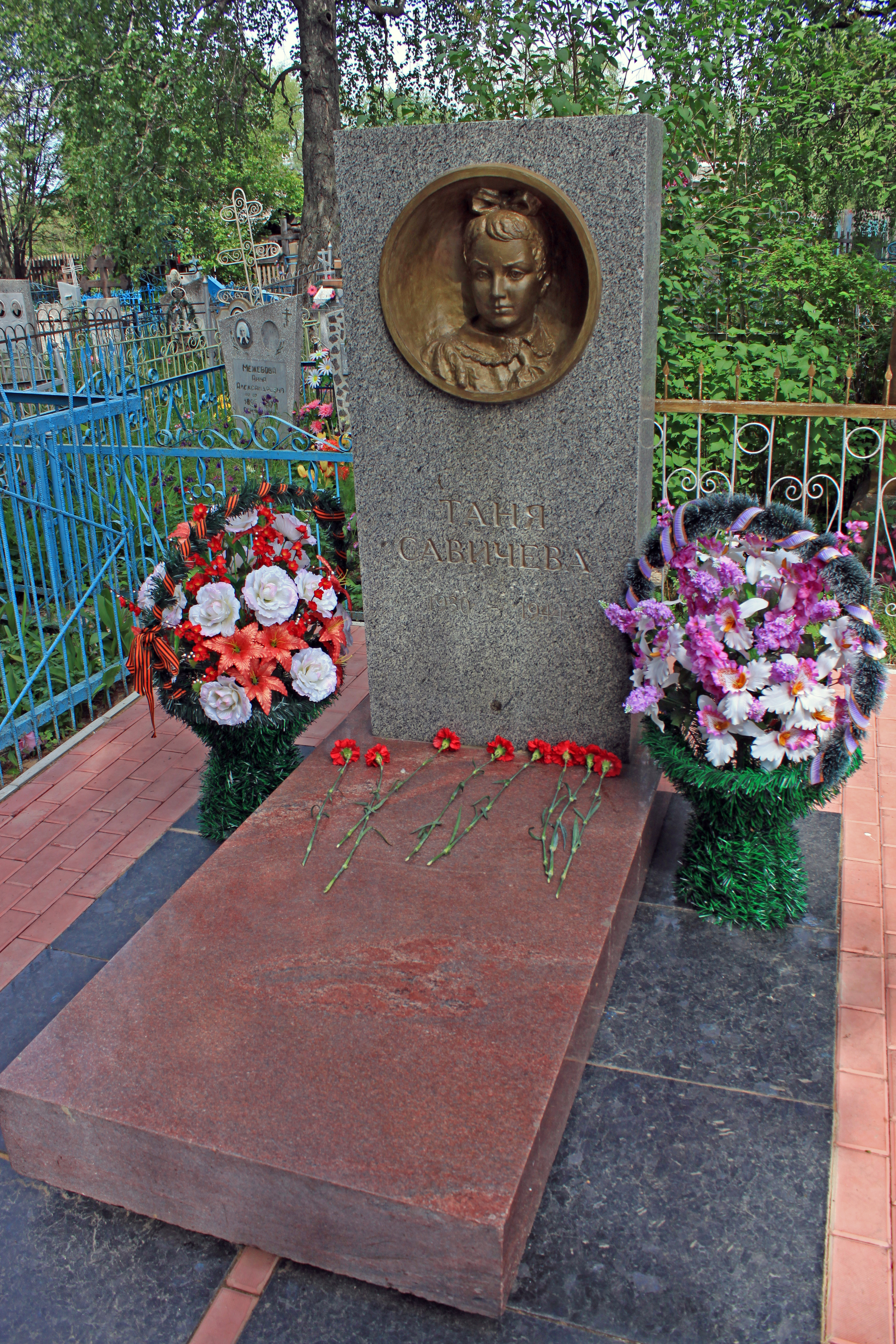
Savicheva's grave at Krasny Bor Cemetery

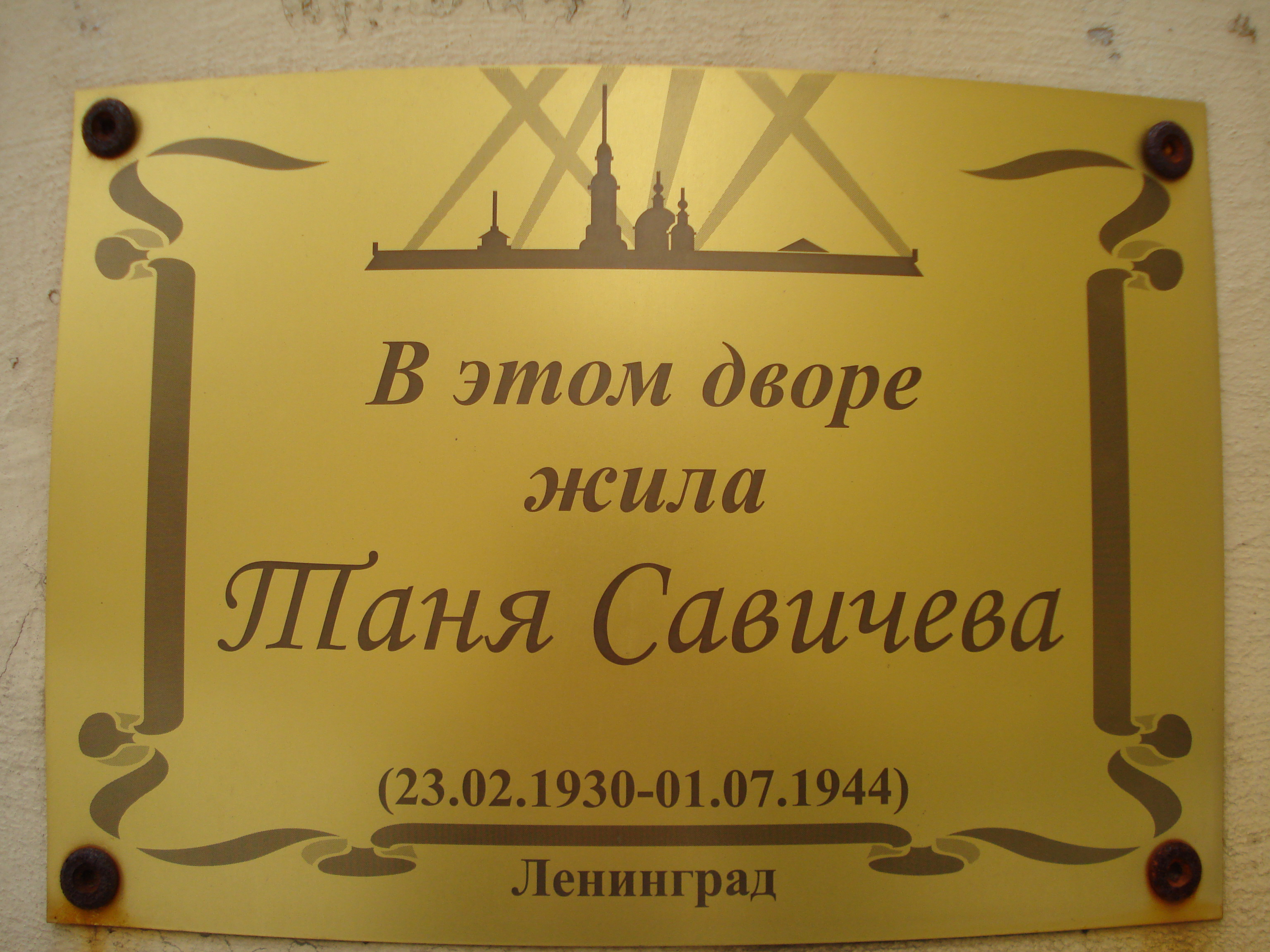
Memorial plaque in the courtyard of Savicheva's house

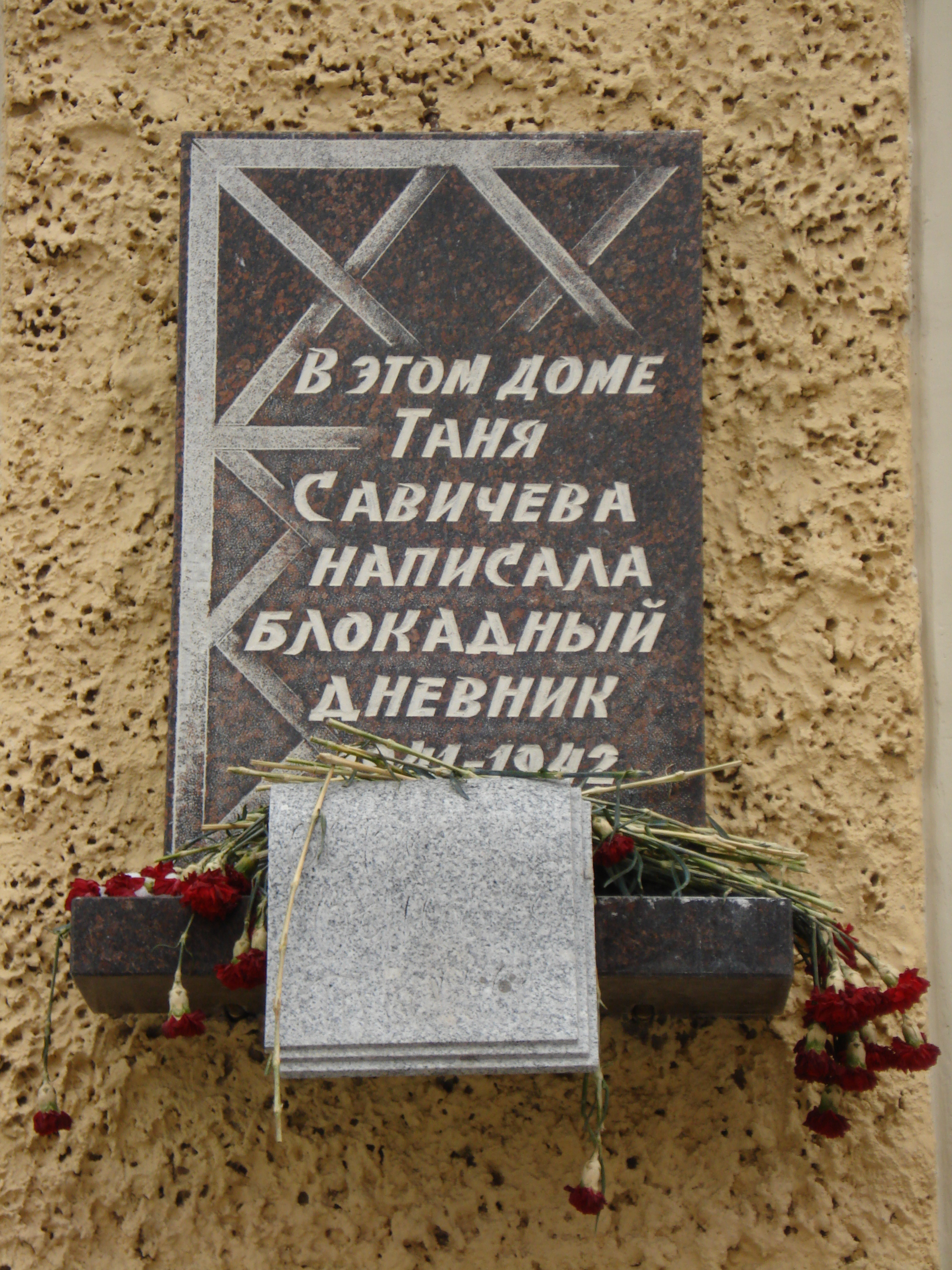
Memorial plaque from Savicheva's house in St. Petersburg

== See also ==
- Mary Berg
- Anne Frank
- Věra Kohnová
- Yoko Moriwaki
- Rutka Laskier
- Lena Mukhina
- Sadako Sasaki
- List of posthumous publications of Holocaust victims

== Cited works and further reading ==
- Heberer, Patricia (2011). Children during the Holocaust. AltaMira Press. ISBN 978-0-759-11984-0.
- Reid, Anna (2011). Leningrad: Tragedy of a City Under Siege: 1941-44. Bloomsbury. ISBN 978-1-408-82241-8.
