= Lena Mukhina =

Russian diarist (1924–1991)

Lena Mukhina, also Lena Muchina (Russian: Елена Владимировна Мухина, Yelena Vladimirovna Mukhina; 21 November 1924 in Ufa – 5 August 1991 in Moscow), was a Russian woman who wrote a diary about her experiences as a teenage schoolgirl during the Siege of Leningrad.

Mukhina's diary entries are dated from 21 May 1941 to 25 May 1942. She was living with her aunt and an elderly family friend in a communal apartment on Mokhavaya Street. The invasion of the Soviet Union happened in June 1941 and household struggled with hunger after the Siege began, surviving on hot gruel and bread and sweets. In December, hunger forced them to kill and eat their pet cat. In January 1942, Mukhina’s family friend died of malnutrition-related causes, and her aunt died in February. Mukhina herself described eating joiners’ glue and the boiled leather wrapping from a machine belt. She avoided death by starvation only because she used her dead aunt’s food ration coupons. Alone in the apartment, she made plans to get evacuated on one of the convoys on “the road of life” on Lake Ladoga to join relatives in Moscow.

She was evacuated from Leningrad in June 1942, and lived in Moscow until her death in 1991.

An unknown donor handed the diary to a state archive in 1962; it was later discovered there by Sergei Yarov. It has been published in Russia (Сохрани мою печальную историю), Norway (Lena's Dagbok), Spain (El diario de Lena), Germany (Lenas Tagebuch), Poland (Dziennik czasu blokady), Finland (Piirityspäiväkirja), and the Netherlands (Lena's Dagboek), as well as in English as The Diary of Lena Mukhina: A Girl's Life in the Siege of Leningrad.

== See also ==
- Tanya Savicheva
- Anne Frank
