= Krasny Bor, Shatkovsky District, Nizhny Novgorod Oblast =

Rural locality in Shatkovsky District, Nizhny Novgorod Oblast, Russia

Coordinates: 55°16′N 44°00′E

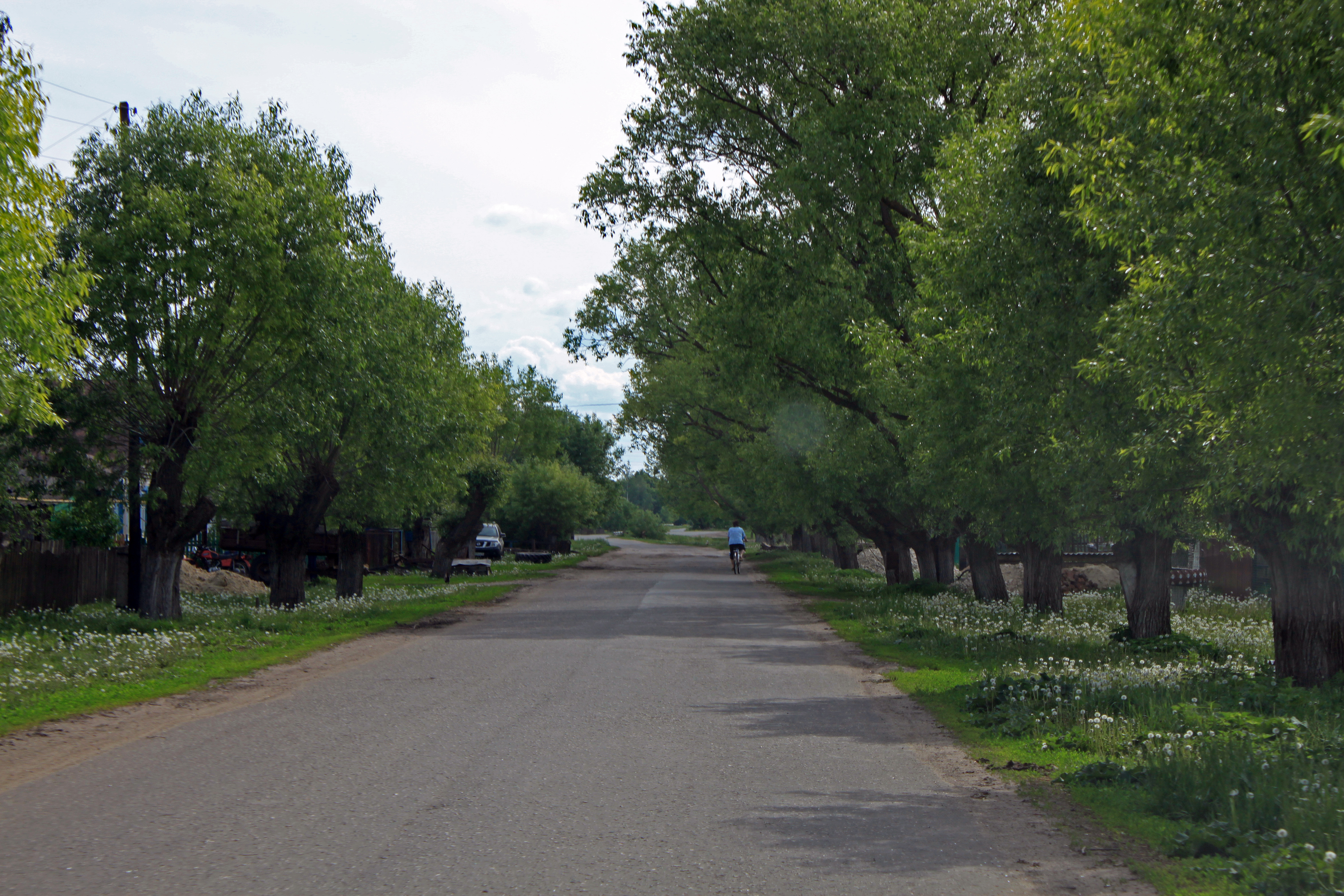
Central Street.

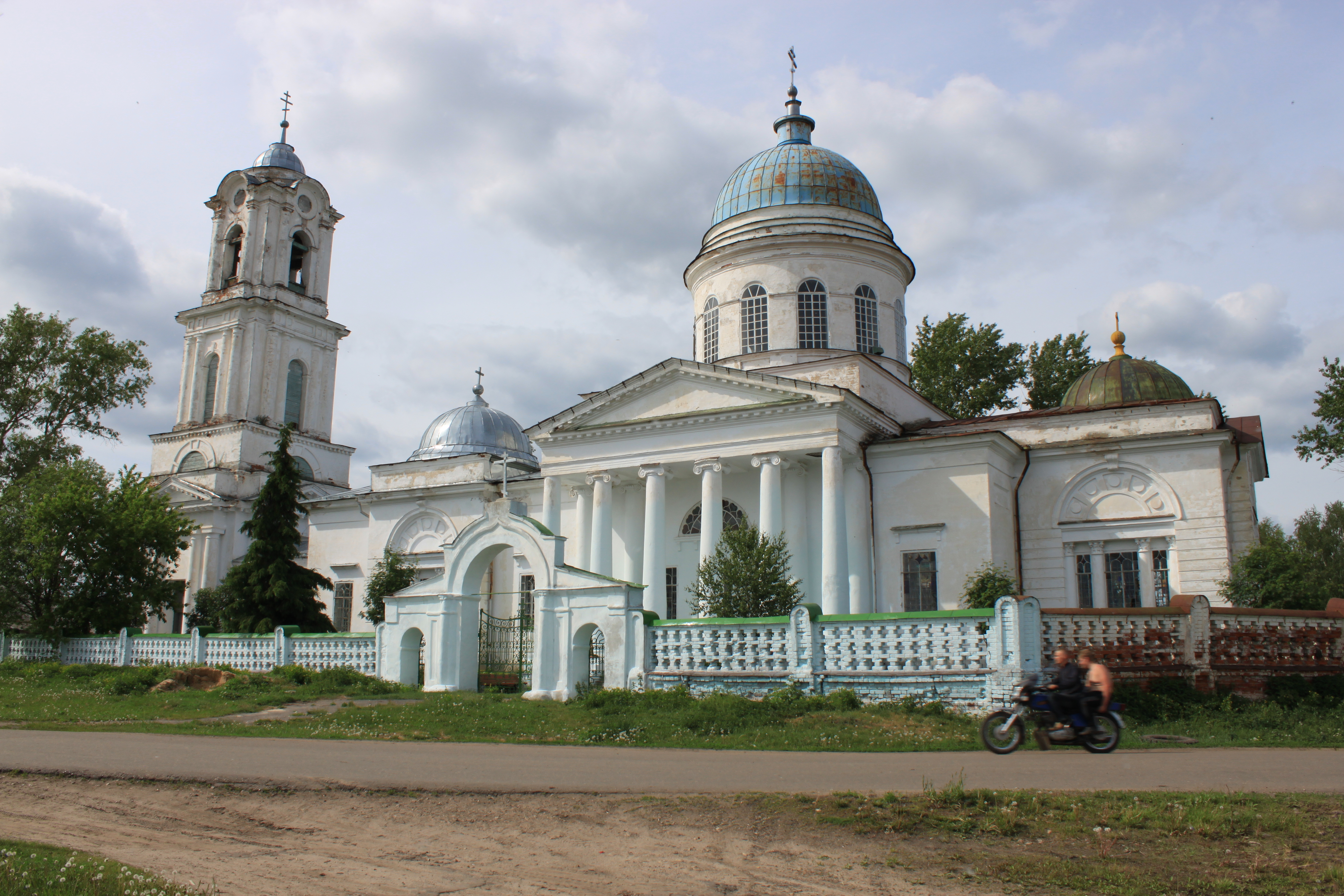
Holy Trinity Church.

Krasny Bor (Russian: Кра́сный Бор) is a rural locality (a settlement) in Krasnoborsky Selsoviet of Shatkovsky District in Nizhny Novgorod Oblast, Russia, located about 17 kilometers (11 mi) southeast from Arzamas.

Tanya Savicheva, a Soviet child who endured the Siege of Leningrad during World War II, was buried there in 1944. In 1972, a stele with a bas-relief of the girl and pages from her diary was built on Tanya's grave with the funds earned by the Young Pioneers and members of the Komsomol organizations from Shatkovsky District. The author of that project was Dmitry Kurtashkin, a tenth-grade student from the selo of Staroye Ivantsevo in Shatkovsky District.
