= Sergey Martynov (politician) =

Russian politician (born 1959)

- Сергей Мартынов
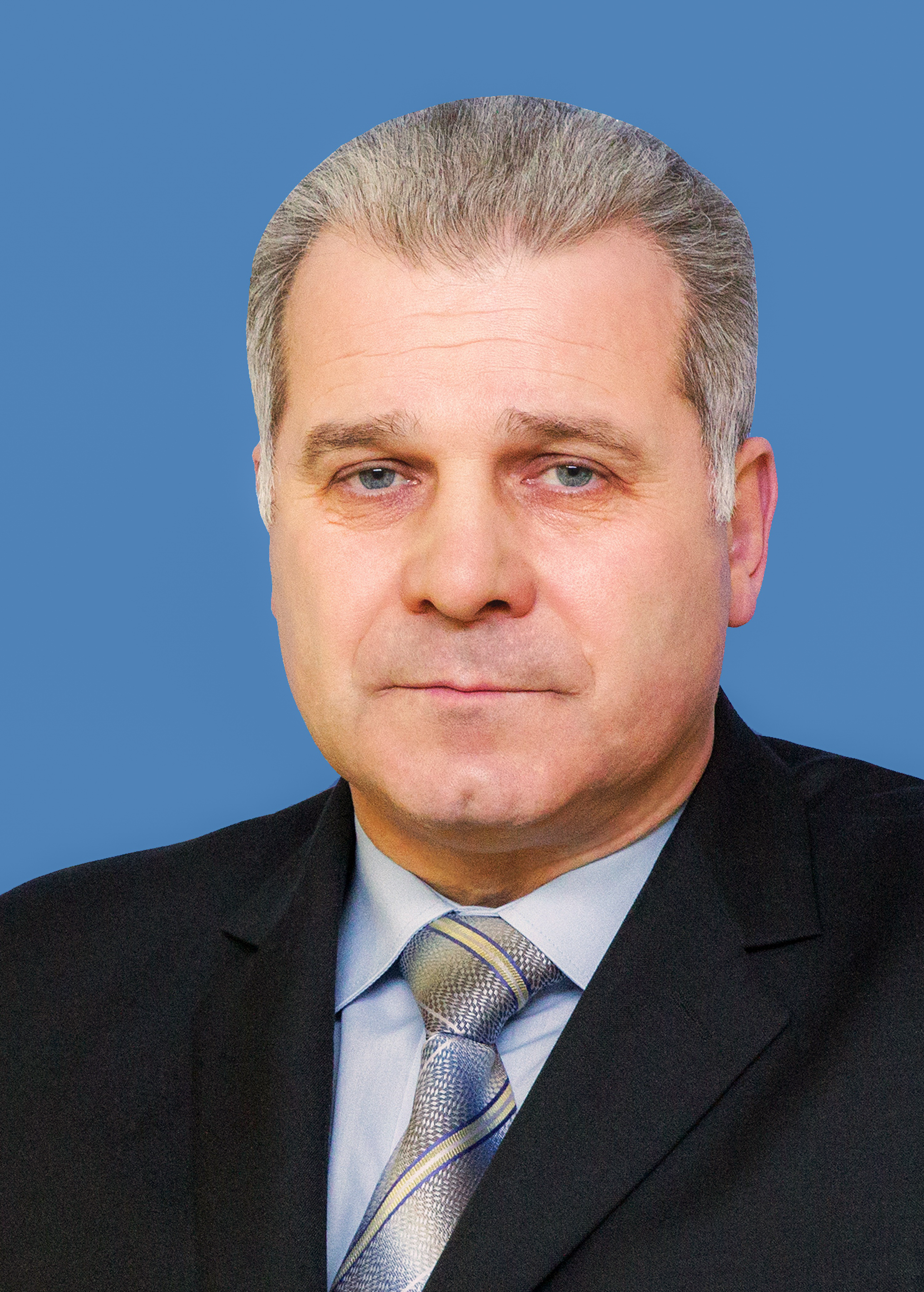

Senator from Mari El
- Incumbent
- Assumed office 7 October 2019
- Preceded by: Natalia Dementieva

Personal details
- Born: Sergey Martynov; 22 August 1959 (age 66) Shatki, Nizhny Novgorod Oblast, Nizhny Novgorod Oblast, Russian Soviet Federative Socialist Republic, Soviet Union
- Political party: United Russia

Sergey Aleksandrovich Martynov (Russian: Сергей Александрович Мартынов; born 22 August 1959) is a Russian statesman who serves as a senator from Mari El since 7 October 2019. Before that he worked in the apparatus of the Federation Council.

He has the federal state civilian service rank of 1st class Active State Councillor of the Russian Federation.

== Biography ==
Martynov was born on 22 August 1959 in Shatki, Nizhny Novgorod Oblast. In 1982, he graduated from the Peter the Great St. Petersburg Polytechnic University. In 2002, he also received a degree from Northwestern Management Institute. From 1982 to 1984, he served in the Soviet Armed Forces. From 1985 to 2000, he served in the KGB. In 2003–2010, he was the Head of the Human Resources and Public Service Administration of the Governor of St. Petersburg Valentina Matviyenko. From 2014 to 2019, he also was the Head of the Federation Council. On 7 October 2019, he became a senator from Mari El.

Sanctions

As of October 19, 2022, Martynov was under personal sanctions introduced by the European Union, the United Kingdom, the USA, Canada, Switzerland, Australia, Ukraine, New Zealand, for ratifying the decisions of the "Treaty of Friendship, Cooperation and Mutual Assistance between the Russian Federation and the Donetsk People's Republic and between the Russian Federation and the Luhansk People's Republic"and providing political and economic support for Russia's annexation of Ukrainian territories.
