= Krasny Bor, Vologda Oblast =

Krasny Bor Красный Бор
- Settlement
- Location within Vologda Oblast Location within Russia
- Coordinates: 59°52′N 42°13′E
- Country: Russia
- Region: Vologda Oblast
- District: Totemsky District
- Time zone: UTC+3:00

Krasny Bor (Russian: Красный Бор) is a rural locality (a settlement) in Kalininskoye Rural Settlement, Totemsky District, Vologda Oblast, Russia. The population was 384 as of 2002. There are 6 streets.

== Geography ==
Krasny Bor is located 41 km southwest of Totma (the district's administrative centre) by road. Zuikha is the nearest rural locality.
