= Krasny Bor, Vladimir Oblast =

Krasny Bor Красный Бор
- Village
- Location within Vladimir Oblast Location within Russia
- Coordinates: 55°49′N 42°18′E
- Country: Russia
- Region: Vladimir Oblast
- District: Muromsky District
- Time zone: UTC+3:00

Krasny Bor (Russian: Кра́сный Бор) is a rural locality (a village) in Borisoglebskoye Rural Settlement, Muromsky District, Vladimir Oblast, Russia. The population was 25 as of 2010.

== Geography ==
Krasny Bor is located 51 km northeast of Murom (the district's administrative centre) by road. Aleshunino is the nearest rural locality.
