= Shatki, Nizhny Novgorod Oblast =

Shatki Шатки
- Urban-type settlement
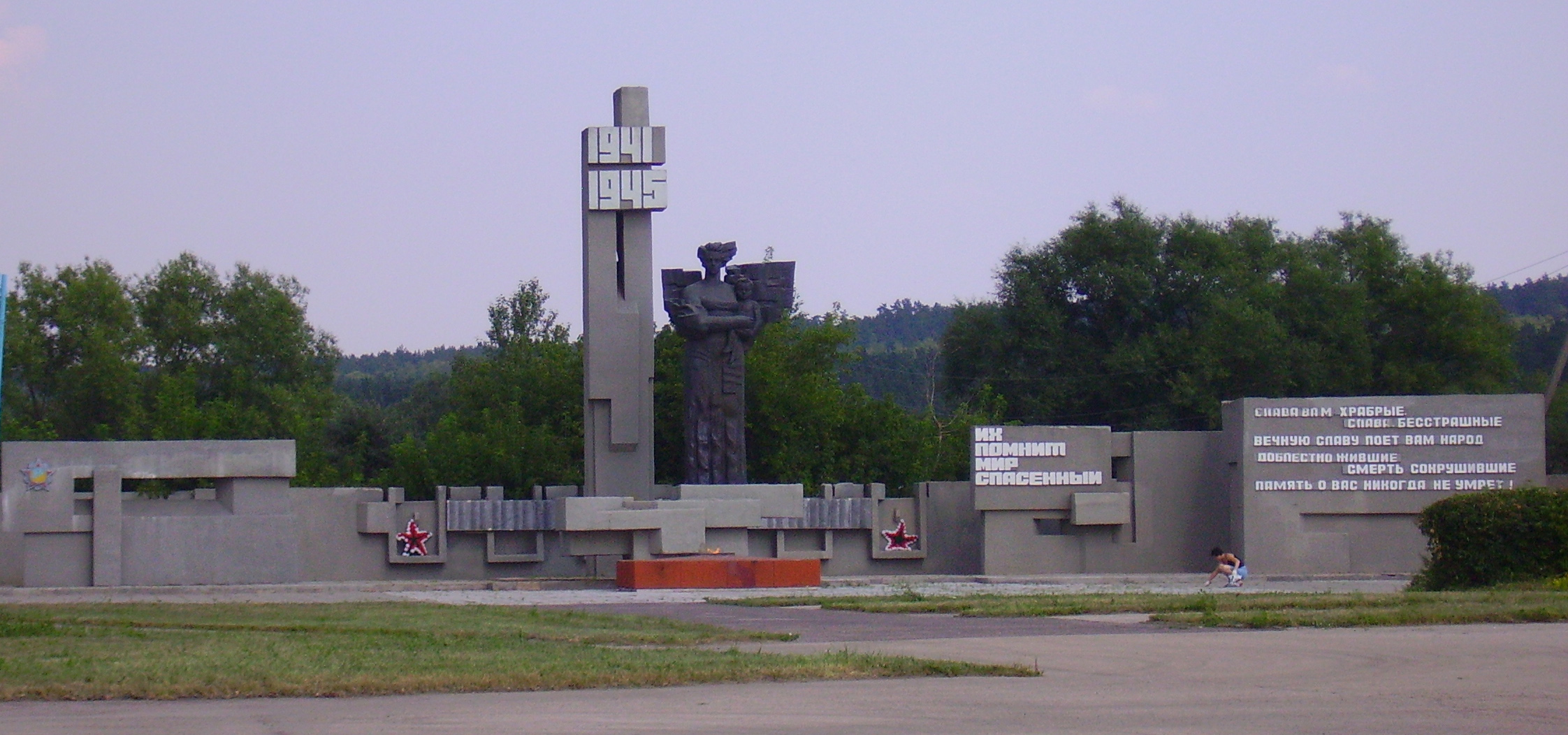
- Interactive map of Shatki
- Location of Shatki Shatki (Nizhny Novgorod Oblast)
- Coordinates: 55.1882°N 44.1275°E
- Country: Russia
- Federal subject: Nizhny Novgorod Oblast
- Administrative district: Shatkovsky District

Population (2010 Census)
  - Total: 9,652
  - Estimate (2025): 8,726 (−9.6%)
- Time zone: UTC+3 (MSK)
- Postal code: 607700
- OKTMO ID: 22657151051

Shatki (Russian: Шатки́) is an urban locality (an urban-type settlement) in Shatkovsky District of Nizhny Novgorod Oblast, Russia. Population: 9,652 (2010 census); 9,879 (2002 census); 9,469 (1989 Soviet census).
