= Shatkovsky District =

Shatkovsky District Шатковский район (Russian)
- District
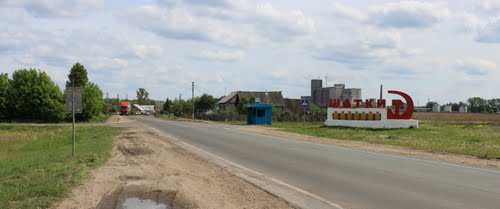
- Entrance to Shatki, Shatkovsky District

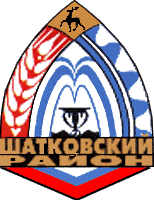
- Coat of arms
- Location of Shatkovsky District in Nizhny Novgorod Oblast
- Coordinates: 55°11′N 44°09′E
- Country: Russia
- Federal subject: Nizhny Novgorod Oblast
- Established: 1929
- Administrative center: Shatki

Area
  - Total: 1,440.7 km^{2} (556.3 sq mi)

Population (2010 Census)
  - Total: 27,018
  - Density: 18.753/km^{2} (48.571/sq mi)
  - Urban: 39.5%
  - Rural: 60.5%

Administrative structure
  - Administrative divisions: 2 Work settlements, 9 Selsoviets
  - Inhabited localities: 2 urban-type settlements, 65 rural localities

Municipal structure
  - Municipally incorporated as: Shatkovsky Municipal District
  - Municipal divisions: 2 urban settlements, 9 rural settlements
- Time zone: UTC+3 (MSK)
- OKTMO ID: 22657000
- Website: http://shatki.info

Shatkovsky District (Russian: Шатко́вский райо́н) is an administrative district (raion), one of the forty in Nizhny Novgorod Oblast, Russia. Municipally, it is incorporated as Shatkovsky Municipal District. It is located in the south of the oblast. The area of the district is 1,440.7 square kilometers (556.3 sq mi). Its administrative center is the urban locality (a work settlement) of Shatki. Population: 27,018 (2010 Census); 28,841 (2002 census); 30,364 (1989 Soviet census). The population of Shatki accounts for 35.7% of the district's total population.

== History ==
The district was established in 1929.
